= Upton, Somerset =

Village in Somerset, England

Coordinates: 51.0489°N 3.4376°W

Upton
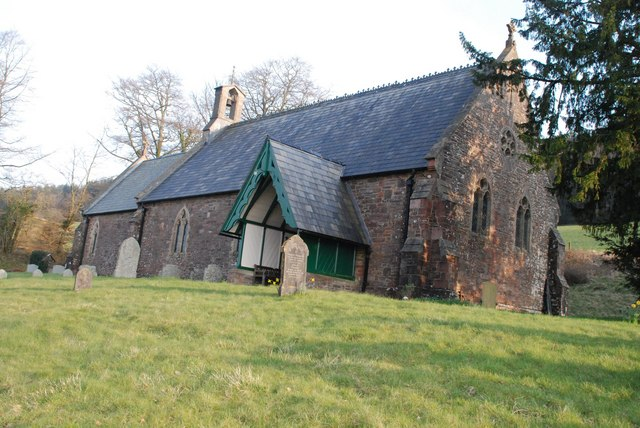
- Church of St James, Upton

- Location within Somerset
- Population: 250 (2011)
- OS grid reference: SS993287
- Unitary authority: Somerset Council
- Ceremonial county: Somerset
- Region: South West
- Country: England
- Sovereign state: United Kingdom
- Post town: Taunton
- Postcode district: TA4
- Police: Avon and Somerset
- Fire: Devon and Somerset
- Ambulance: South Western
- UK Parliament: Tiverton and Minehead

Upton is a village and civil parish north of Skilgate in Somerset, England. It is situated on a hill above the eastern end of Wimbleball Lake.

== History ==
The parish of Upton was part of the Williton and Freemanners Hundred.

Pepperpot Castle, which is also known as Haddon Lodge, was built By Lady Harriet Acland, during the long period of her widowhood, 1778–1815, as a lodge to the drive to connect Pixton Park in Dulverton where her daughter the Countess of Carnarvon lived, with her own estates near Wiveliscombe.

== Governance ==
The parish council has responsibility for local issues, including setting an annual precept (local rate) to cover the council’s operating costs and producing annual accounts for public scrutiny. The parish council evaluates local planning applications and works with the local police, district council officers, and neighbourhood watch groups on matters of crime, security, and traffic. The parish council's role also includes initiating projects for the maintenance and repair of parish facilities, as well as consulting with the district council on the maintenance, repair, and improvement of highways, drainage, footpaths, public transport, and street cleaning. Conservation matters (including trees and listed buildings) and environmental issues are also the responsibility of the council.

For local government purposes, since 1 April 2023, the parish comes under the unitary authority of Somerset Council. Prior to this, it was part of the non-metropolitan district of Somerset West and Taunton (formed on 1 April 2019) and, before this, the district of West Somerset (established under the Local Government Act 1972). It was part of Dulverton Rural District before 1974.

It is also part of the Tiverton and Minehead county constituency represented in the House of Commons of the Parliament of the United Kingdom. It elects one Member of Parliament (MP) by the first past the post system of election.

== Religious sites ==
The remains of the Old Church of St James, which dates from the 14th century can still be seen. The current parish church of St James was built in 1870.

The non conformist Ebenezer Chapel dates from 1878.
