= Treborough =

Village and civil parish in Somerset, England

Coordinates: 51°07′04″N 3°24′51″W

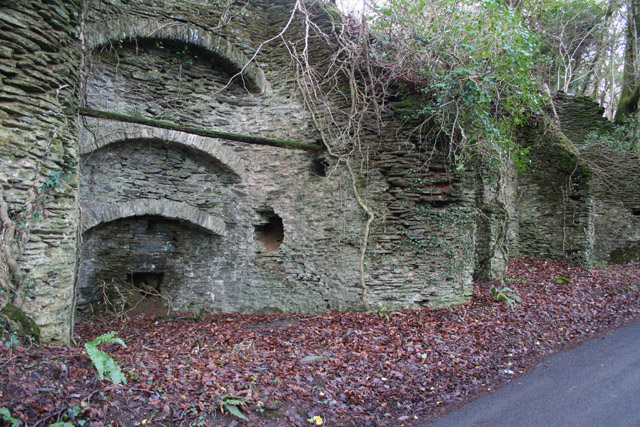
- Treborough lime kilns

- Location within Somerset
- Population: 42
- OS grid reference: ST015365
- Unitary authority: Somerset Council
- Ceremonial county: Somerset
- Region: South West
- Country: England
- Sovereign state: United Kingdom
- Post town: WATCHET
- Postcode district: TA23
- Dialling code: 01984
- Police: Avon and Somerset
- Fire: Devon and Somerset
- Ambulance: South Western
- UK Parliament: Tiverton and Minehead

Treborough is a small village and civil parish 7 miles (11 km) south of Dunster, lying amongst the Brendon Hills within the Exmoor National Park in Somerset, England.

== History ==
The name Treborough is thought to be derived from the Celtic treberg meaning "hamlet by the waterfall", or wooded place or hill, from the Old English treow for tree.

Treborough was part of the hundred of Carhampton.

Within the village are a pair of lime kilns which date from the early 19th century and are made from flat-bedded local slate.

== Governance ==
The parish council has responsibility for local issues, including setting an annual precept (local rate) to cover the council's operating costs and producing annual accounts for public scrutiny. The parish council evaluates local planning applications and works with the local police, district council officers, and neighbourhood watch groups on matters of crime, security, and traffic. The parish council's role also includes initiating projects for the maintenance and repair of parish facilities, as well as consulting with the district council on the maintenance, repair, and improvement of highways, drainage, footpaths, public transport, and street cleaning. Conservation matters (including trees and listed buildings) and environmental issues are also the responsibility of the council.

For local government purposes, since 1 April 2023, the parish comes under the unitary authority of Somerset Council. Prior to this, it was part of the non-metropolitan district of Somerset West and Taunton (formed on 1 April 2019) and, before this, the district of West Somerset (established under the Local Government Act 1972). It was part of Williton Rural District before 1974.

It is also part of the Bridgwater and West Somerset county constituency represented in the House of Commons of the Parliament of the United Kingdom. It elects one Member of Parliament (MP) by the first past the post system of election.

== Geography ==
The Washford River rises just south of the village, within the civil parish, and flows to join the Bristol Channel at Watchet.

Treborough Woods are a 70 acres (28.3 ha) area which contain the site of a slate quarry which was used for 500 years until production finished in World War II.

== Religious sites ==
The Church of St Peter dates from the 14th century and has been designated by English Heritage as a Grade II* listed building.
