= West Quantoxhead =

Village in Somerset, England

Coordinates: 51.1707°N 3.2698°W

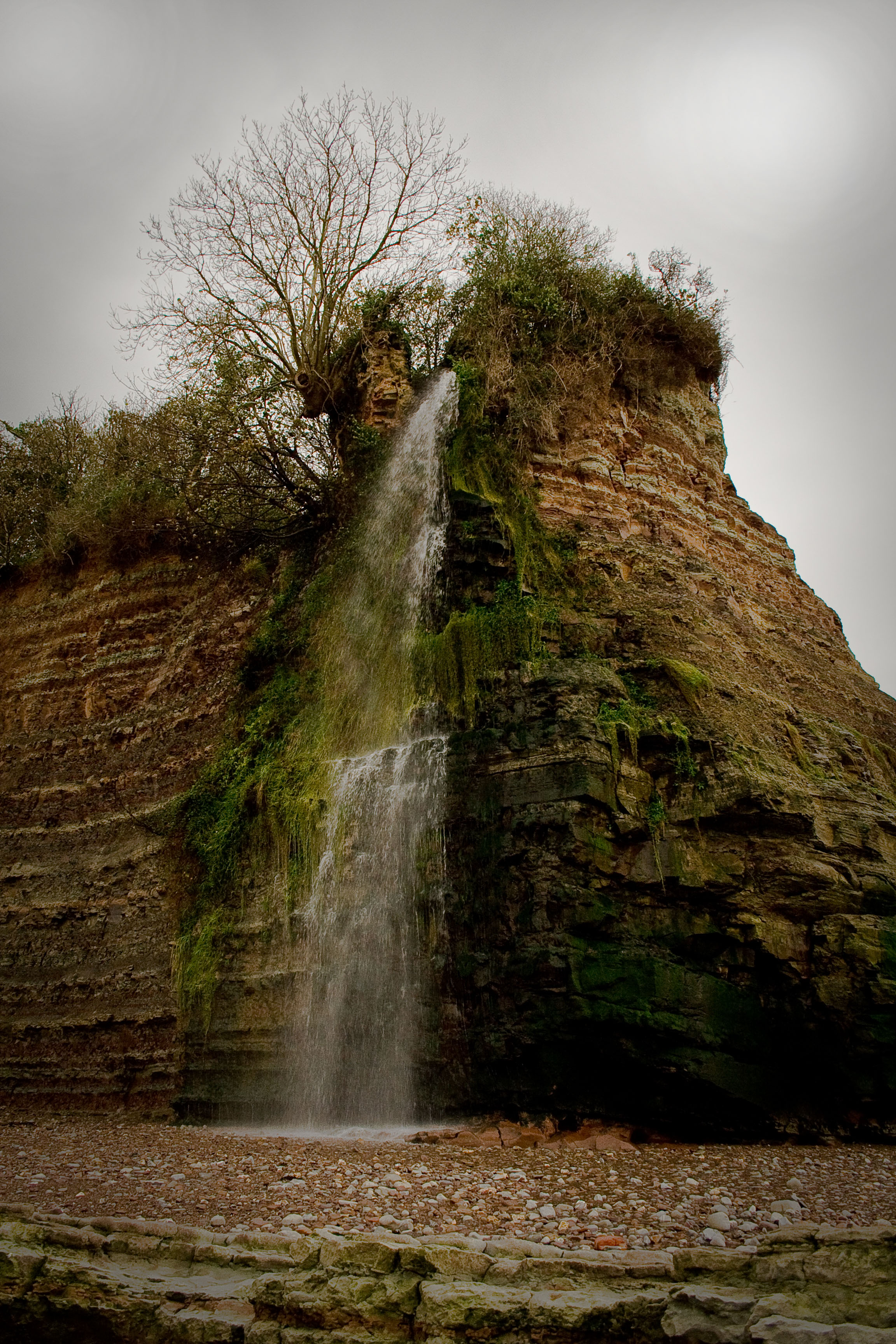
- The waterfall in St Audrie's bay

- Location within Somerset
- Population: 343
- OS grid reference: ST113420
- Unitary authority: Somerset
- Ceremonial county: Somerset
- Region: South West
- Country: England
- Sovereign state: United Kingdom
- Post town: Taunton
- Postcode district: TA4
- Dialling code: 01984
- Police: Avon and Somerset
- Fire: Devon and Somerset
- Ambulance: South Western
- UK Parliament: Tiverton and Minehead

West Quantoxhead (St Audries) is a small village and civil parish in Somerset, England. It lies on the route of the Coleridge Way and on the A39 road at the foot of the Quantock Hills, 3 miles (5 km) from East Quantoxhead, 2.5 miles (4 km) from Williton and equidistant from Bridgwater and Taunton. The parish includes the hamlets of Weacombe and Lower Weacombe.

West Quantoxhead is also known as St Audries. The St Audries Manor Estate was named for the dedication of the parish church to Æthelthryth known as St Ethelreda, who was also known as St Audrey.

== History ==
"West Quantoxhead is spelt as Cantocheve in the Domesday Book of 1086. West Quantoxhead is listed amongst the large number of manors that are owned by William de Moyon.

In 1086, the book notes that:

"William himself owns West Quantoxhead" . Alnoth held it TRE and it paid geld for three and a half hides. There is land for eight ploughs. In demesne are 3 ploughs and 7 slaves and 10 villans and 4 bordars with 6 ploughs. There are sixteen acres of meadow and 30 of woodland and pasture 1 league by one league. It was worth three pounds, now four."

The parish of West Quantoxhead was part of the Williton and Freemanners Hundred.

The manor was held from the early 13th century by the Cauntelo family, and from about 1400 to 1736 by the Malets.

The manor of St Audries was bought by Sir Peregrine Palmer Fuller-Palmer-Acland of the Acland baronets in 1836.

St Audries Park, the manor house of the Aclands was renovated between 1835 and 1870. The property was divided in 1934, when the house was sold and turned into St Audries School, which remained in occupation until 1990, when the house was sold to the Amitabha Buddhist Centre. It was sold again in 2001.

Alexander Fuller-Acland-Hood PC was the Conservative Party Member of Parliament for Wellington from 1892 until 1911, Vice-Chamberlain of the Household from 1900 to 1902 and Parliamentary Secretary to the Treasury (Chief Whip) from 1902 until 1905. He was sworn a Privy Counsellor in 1904. In 1911, he was ennobled as Baron St Audries.

== Governance ==
The parish council has responsibility for local issues, including setting an annual precept (local rate) to cover the council's operating costs and producing annual accounts for public scrutiny. The parish council evaluates local planning applications and works with the local police, district council officers, and neighbourhood watch groups on matters of crime, security, and traffic. The parish council's role also includes initiating projects for the maintenance and repair of parish facilities, as well as consulting with the district council on the maintenance, repair, and improvement of highways, drainage, footpaths, public transport, and street cleaning. Conservation matters (including trees and listed buildings) and environmental issues are also the responsibility of the council.

For local government purposes, since 1 April 2023, the parish comes under the unitary authority of Somerset Council. Prior to this, it was part of the non-metropolitan district of Somerset West and Taunton (formed on 1 April 2019) and, before this, the district of West Somerset (established under the Local Government Act 1972). It was part of Williton Rural District before 1974.

The appropriate electoral ward is 'West Quantock'. The ward stretches from East Quantoxhead south to Bicknoller. The total ward population at the 2011 Census is 1,088.

It is also part of the Tiverton and Minehead county constituency represented in the House of Commons of the Parliament of the United Kingdom. It elects one Member of Parliament (MP) by the first past the post system of election.

== Geography ==
The Quantock Hills are largely formed by rocks of the Devonian Period, which consist of sediments originally laid down under a shallow sea and slowly compressed into solid rock. In the higher north western areas older Early Devonian rocks, known as Hangman Grits, predominate, and can be seen in the exposed rock at West Quantoxhead quarry, which were worked for road building.

== Religious sites ==
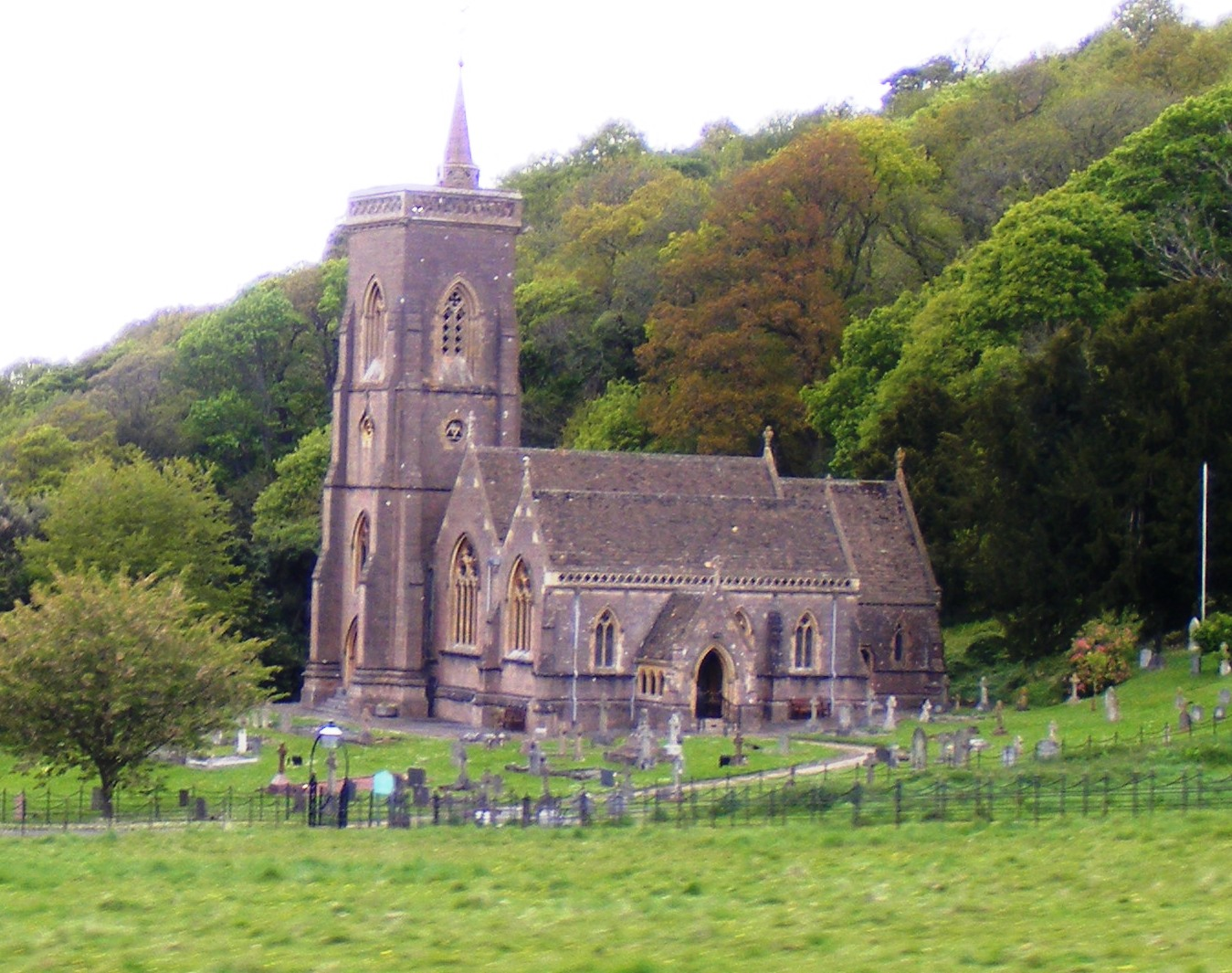
St Audries church

The old medieval church in the village became so dilapidated that it was entirely rebuilt in 1856 leaving only the shaft of a cross from the original building in the churchyard, two of the bells dated 1440, a Norman font and a stone coffin. The new church, rededicated to St. Ethel Dreda, was built by John Morton for Sir Peregrine Acland and his son-in-law, Sir Alexander Fuller-Acland-Hood, 1st Baron St Audries of the Acland baronets.
