= Luxborough =

Village in Somerset, England

Coordinates: 51.1318°N 3.4638°W

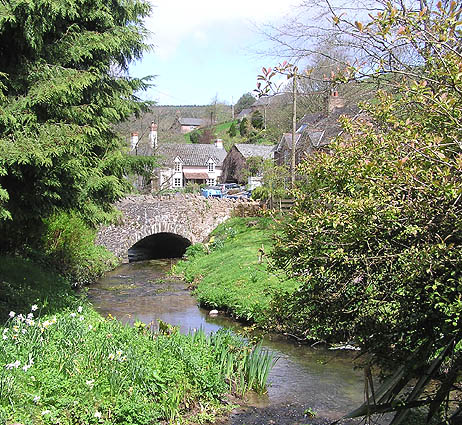
- The lower road bridge over the Washford River in Pooltown, Luxborough

- Location within Somerset
- Population: 237
- OS grid reference: SS976379
- Civil parish: Luxborough
- Unitary authority: Somerset Council
- Ceremonial county: Somerset
- Region: South West
- Country: England
- Sovereign state: United Kingdom
- Post town: WATCHET
- Postcode district: TA23
- Dialling code: 01984
- Police: Avon and Somerset
- Fire: Devon and Somerset
- Ambulance: South Western
- UK Parliament: Tiverton and Minehead

Luxborough is a small village and civil parish located some 6 miles (9.7 km) south of Dunster, lying amongst the Brendon Hills and the Exmoor National Park in Somerset, England. It is divided into the hamlets of Churchtown, Kingsbridge and Pooltown, which lie within a mile of each other. Luxborough, 'Lolochesberie' in the Domesday Book, means 'stronghold or hill of a man called Lulluc'.

In 2011, the population of the parish was 237.

== History ==
Luxborough was part of the hundred of Carhampton.

About 100 years ago, people used to mine iron ore around Luxborough. It was taken by train down the West Somerset Mineral Railway's incline to Watchet, beside the Bristol Channel and shipped to Newport. There are the remains of several buildings, including stations, such as Luxborough Road railway station.

Luxborough had a new village hall put in a few years ago, and because there is no mobile phone signal in the village, it still has its old telephone box.

The village school was closed in 1971 as the result of the three-tier education system introduced in West Somerset. Village children now attend Dunster School. In the 19th century the school was reported to have 200 pupils from the village and the iron mines in the Brendon Hills.

== Governance ==
The parish council has responsibility for local issues, including setting an annual precept (local rate) to cover the council’s operating costs and producing annual accounts for public scrutiny. The parish council evaluates local planning applications and works with the local police, district council officers, and neighbourhood watch groups on matters of crime, security, and traffic. The parish council's role also includes initiating projects for the maintenance and repair of parish facilities, as well as consulting with the district council on the maintenance, repair, and improvement of highways, drainage, footpaths, public transport, and street cleaning. Conservation matters (including trees and listed buildings) and environmental issues are also the responsibility of the council.

For local government purposes, since 1 April 2023, the village comes under the unitary authority of Somerset Council. Prior to this, it was part of the non-metropolitan district of Somerset West and Taunton (formed on 1 April 2019) and, before this, the district of West Somerset (established under the Local Government Act 1972). It was part of Williton Rural District before 1974.

It is also part of the Tiverton and Minehead county constituency represented in the House of Commons of the Parliament of the United Kingdom. It elects one Member of Parliament (MP) by the first past the post system of election.

== Geography ==
The Washford River flows through both Kingsbridge and Pooltown, which takes its name from the large number of pools on the river there. The Washford River is joined by one of its tributaries, which flows in the Churchtown valley, starting in the wooded combe called Throat.

The village is both on the route of the Coleridge Way and Samaritans Way South West and is located within the Exmoor National Park.

== Religious sites ==
The Church of St Mary dates from Norman times, but has had the tower added on and it had an extension put on in the 19th century. It is a Grade II listed building A new window was added in 2002.
