= Carhampton =

Village and civil parish in Somerset, England

Coordinates: 51.1731°N 3.4247°W

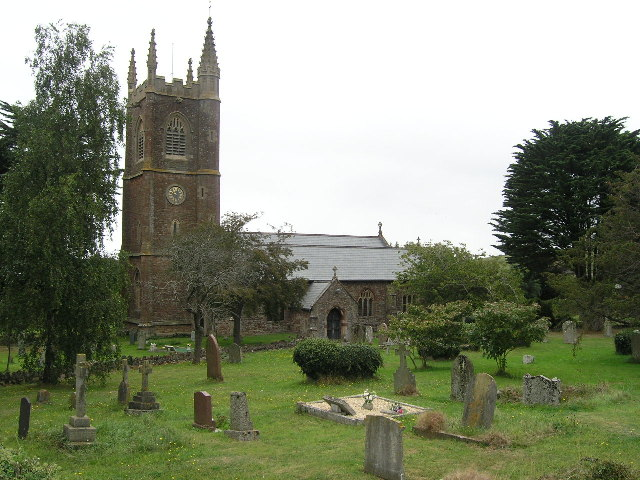
- St John the Baptist

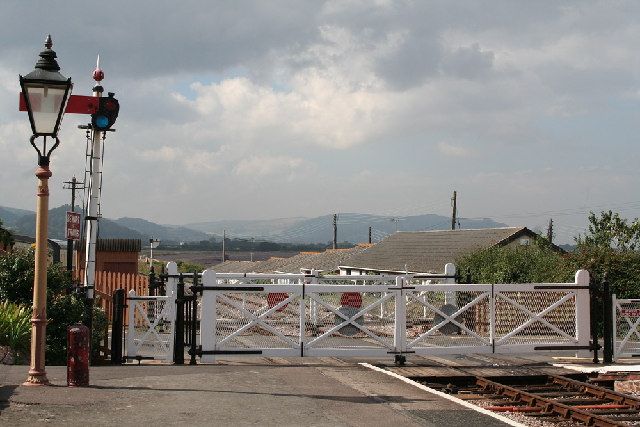
- West Somerset Railway at Blue Anchor

- Location within Somerset
- Population: 865
- OS grid reference: ST005425
- Unitary authority: Somerset Council
- Ceremonial county: Somerset
- Region: South West
- Country: England
- Sovereign state: United Kingdom
- Post town: MINEHEAD
- Postcode district: TA24
- Dialling code: 01643
- Police: Avon and Somerset
- Fire: Devon and Somerset
- Ambulance: South Western
- UK Parliament: Tiverton and Minehead

Carhampton is a village and civil parish in Somerset, England, 4 miles (6.4 km) to the east of Minehead.

Carhampton civil parish stretches from the Bristol Channel coast inland to Exmoor. The parish has a population of 865 (2011 census).

== History ==
Iron Age occupation of the parish is evident from the remains of Bat's Castle hillfort and associated earthworks. Archaeological excavation in the mid-1990s suggested the existence of early Christian settlement and burial to the east of the village, which had previously been the site of a metalworking settlement.

Carhampton is thought to have been the centre for a Saxon royal estate. The king and his court would locate temporarily to Carhampton as part of a visiting circuit. One function was that officials of the royal court operated from Carhampton to collect taxes from surrounding estates. The village was subjected to Viking raids.

A map of Britain during the middle of the 9th century, including a map of the location of the Anglo Saxon battle with Danes at Carhampton

The Anglo-Saxon Chronicle state that, in 836, King Egbert fought the crews of 35 ships at Carhampton. With the Danes in possession of the battlefield, the Chronicle recount a great slaughter.

Carhampton was part of the hundred of Carhampton.

== Earl of Carhampton ==
The title of Earl of Carhampton was created in the Peerage of Ireland in 1785, but became extinct upon the death of the 3rd Earl in 1829. The earls bore the subsidiary titles of Viscount Carhampton (1781) and Baron Irnham (1768), both in the Peerage of Ireland. The Lutrells arrived from Normandy with the Norman conquest of England, acquiring estates as reward for services to the Crown.

== Governance ==
The parish council has responsibility for local issues, including setting an annual precept (local rate) to cover the council's operating costs and producing annual accounts for public scrutiny. The parish council evaluates local planning applications and works with the local police, district council officers, and neighbourhood watch groups on matters of crime, security, and traffic. The parish council's role also includes initiating projects for the maintenance and repair of parish facilities, as well as consulting with the district council on the maintenance, repair, and improvement of highways, drainage, footpaths, public transport, and street cleaning. Conservation matters (including trees and listed buildings) and environmental issues are also the responsibility of the council.

For local government purposes, since 1 April 2023, the parish comes under the unitary authority of Somerset Council. Prior to this, it was part of the non-metropolitan district of Somerset West and Taunton (formed on 1 April 2019) and, before this, the district of West Somerset (established under the Local Government Act 1972). It was part of Williton Rural District before 1974.

There is an electoral ward called 'Carhampton and Withycombe'. The ward extends north to the coast at Blue Anchor and south to Rodhuish. The total ward population is 1,158.

It is also part of the Tiverton and Minehead represented in the House of Commons of the Parliament of the United Kingdom. It elects one Member of Parliament (MP) by the first past the post system of election.

== Religious sites ==
The parish Church of St John the Baptist dates from the Perpendicular period, but was extensively restored, and the north wall rebuilt in 1862–63. The tower was rebuilt between 1868 and 1870 and the vestry was added. It is a Grade I listed building.

== Legend ==
Carhampton is associated with the Arthurian legend of Saint Carannog. Carannog is said to have tamed a dragon, or slain a serpent that was terrorising the inhabitants of Carrum (Carhampton). On victory, Carannog was granted by Arthur the right to build a monastery in the village.

== Wassailing ==
Carhampton is known for its wassailing celebration which was started in 1930s by the Taunton Cider Company. Wassailing in Carhampton takes place on 17 January in the orchard of the Butcher's Arms pub. This is preceded by a smaller event in the Community Orchard in the centre of the village next to the pub. The villagers form a circle around the largest apple tree, hang pieces of toast soaked in cider in the branches for the robin, who represent the 'good spirits' of the tree. A shotgun is fired overhead to scare away evil spirits.

Carhampton wassailing song

Old apple tree, we wassail thee,
And hoping thou wilt bear
For the Lord doth know where we shall be
Till apples come another year.
For to bear well, and to bear well
So merry let us be,
Let every man take off his hat,
And shout to the old apple tree!
Old apple tree, we wassail thee,
And hoping thou wilt bear
Hatfuls, capfuls and three bushel bagfuls
And a little heap under the stairs,
Hip, Hip, Hooray!

== Notable residents ==
- Gwendolyn Watts (1937–2000)

== See also ==
- Wassail
