= Exford, Somerset =

Village in England

Coordinates: 51.135255°N 3.638213°W

Exford
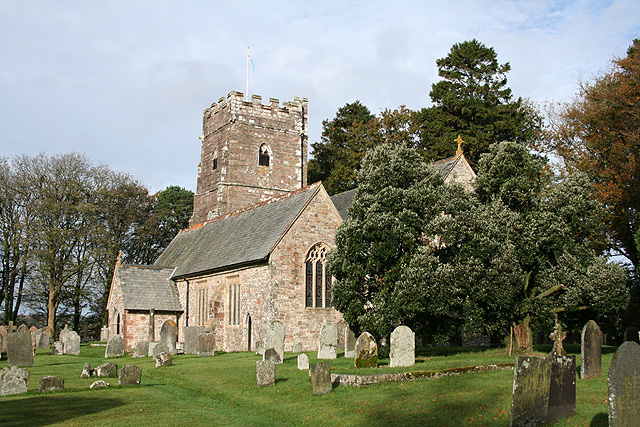
- St Mary Magdalene, also known as the Church of St Salvyn

- Location within Somerset
- Population: 405 (2011)
- OS grid reference: SS855385
- Unitary authority: Somerset
- Ceremonial county: Somerset
- Region: South West
- Country: England
- Sovereign state: United Kingdom
- Post town: MINEHEAD
- Postcode district: TA24
- Dialling code: 01643
- Police: Avon and Somerset
- Fire: Devon and Somerset
- Ambulance: South Western
- UK Parliament: Tiverton and Minehead

Exford is a rural village at the centre of Exmoor National Park, 7 miles (11 km) north-west of Dulverton, and 10 miles (16 km) south-west of Minehead, in Somerset, England. Less than a mile away is the hamlet of Lyncombe.

Situated on the B3224, the main route across Exmoor, it is a small village on the River Exe with activities including hunting, shooting, fishing and horse riding.

The centre of the village surrounds a traditional village green, and is home to a general store, car repair shop, and primary school as well as a children's play area.

The village is on the route of the Samaritans Way South West and the Celtic Way Exmoor Option.

== History ==
To the east of the village are the prehistoric hillside enclosures of Road Castle and Staddon Hill Camp and to the west is Cow Castle, an Iron Age hillfort.

The Domesday Book of 1086 records eight settlements in the parish, five called Exford and the others at Almesworthy (Edmunds homestead), Stone and Downscombe.

The parish was part of the hundred of Carhampton.

The bridge over the river was built in 1930 on a medieval site.

In the mid 19th century there were several iron and copper mines in and around the village by the Exford Iron Ore Co.

The Devon and Somerset Staghounds have had their kennels, which were built by Montague Bissett, at Exford since 1875.

== Governance ==
The parish council has responsibility for local issues, including setting an annual precept (local rate) to cover the council's operating costs and producing annual accounts for public scrutiny. The parish council evaluates local planning applications and works with the local police, district council officers, and neighbourhood watch groups on matters of crime, security, and traffic. The parish council's role also includes initiating projects for the maintenance and repair of parish facilities, as well as consulting with the district council on the maintenance, repair, and improvement of highways, drainage, footpaths, public transport, and street cleaning. Conservation matters (including trees and listed buildings) and environmental issues are also the responsibility of the council.

For local government purposes, since 1 April 2023, the parish comes under the unitary authority of Somerset Council. Prior to this, it was part of the non-metropolitan district of Somerset West and Taunton (formed on 1 April 2019) and, before this, the district of West Somerset (established under the Local Government Act 1972). It was part of Dulverton Rural District before 1974.

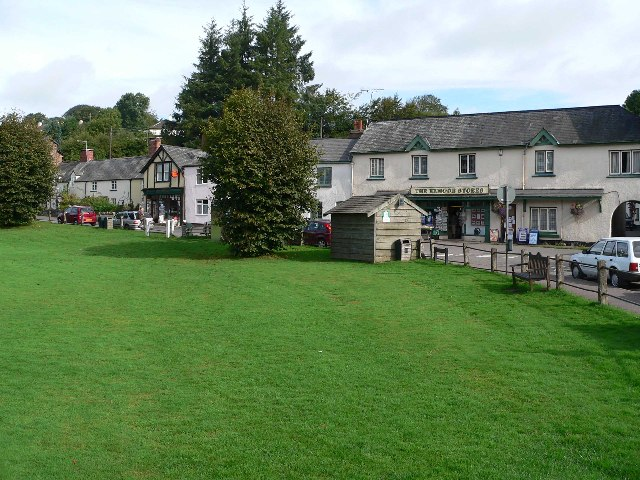
Exford Village Green

As Exford falls within the Exmoor National Park some functions normally administered by district or county councils have, since 1997, fallen under the Exmoor National Park Authority, which is known as a 'single purpose' authority, which aims to "conserve and enhance the natural beauty, wildlife and cultural heritage of the National Parks" and "promote opportunities for the understanding and enjoyment of the special qualities of the Parks by the public", including responsibility for the conservation of the historic environment.

It is also part of the Tiverton and Minehead county constituency represented in the House of Commons of the Parliament of the United Kingdom. It elects one Member of Parliament (MP) by the first past the post system of election.

== Landmarks ==
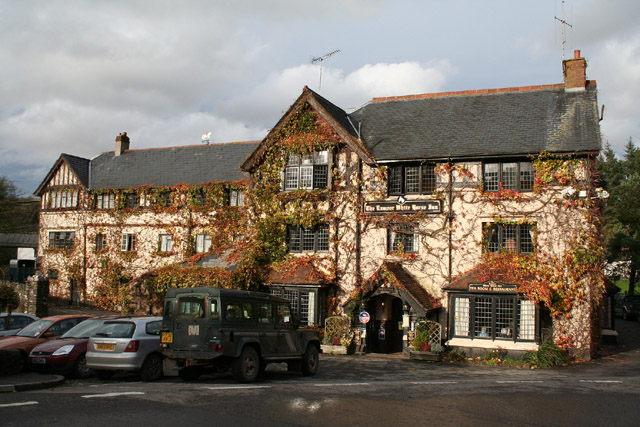
White Horse Inn

There are two hotels: The Crown and The Exmoor White Horse Inn. 500 metres south of Exford alongside the River Exe lies the hamlet of Court.

== Religious sites ==
The church, dedicated to St Mary Magdalene (formerly known as the Church of St Salvyn), is a stone structure with a lofty tower dating from the 15th century. The south aisle probably dates from 1542, however the nave, chancel and porch were not built until 1867. It has been designated by English Heritage as a Grade II* listed building. It is about half a mile from the village itself.

Christopher Woodforde served as rector of the parish between 1936 and 1939. The current benefice priest is the Revd. David Wier.

== Transport ==
Buses are run by Atwest.
