= Wootton Courtenay =

Village and civil parish in Somerset, England

Coordinates: 51.1785°N 3.5195°W

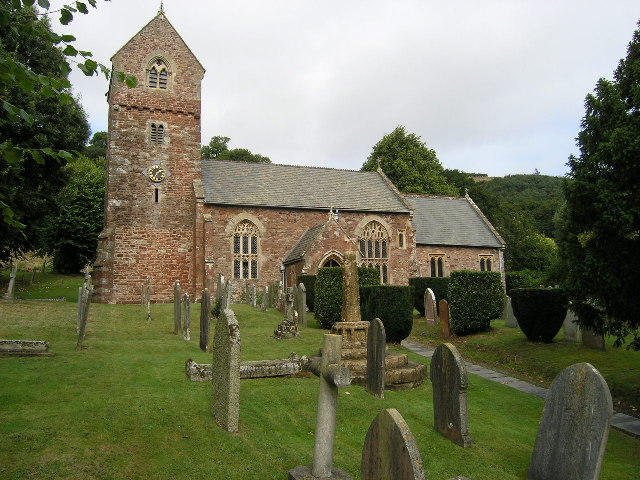
- Church of All Saints, Wootton Courtenay

- Location within Somerset
- Population: 264 (2011)
- OS grid reference: SS938432
- Unitary authority: Somerset Council
- Ceremonial county: Somerset
- Region: South West
- Country: England
- Sovereign state: United Kingdom
- Post town: MINEHEAD
- Postcode district: TA24
- Dialling code: 01643
- Police: Avon and Somerset
- Fire: Devon and Somerset
- Ambulance: South Western
- UK Parliament: Tiverton and Minehead

Wootton Courtenay is a village and civil parish on Exmoor in Somerset, England. The parish includes the hamlets of Brockwell and Huntscott.

The village lies on the route of the Macmillan Way West and the Celtic Way Exmoor Option.

== History ==
Wootton was part of the hundred of Carhampton.

== Governance ==
The parish council has responsibility for local issues, including setting an annual precept (local rate) to cover the council's operating costs and producing annual accounts for public scrutiny. The parish council evaluates local planning applications and works with the local police, district council officers, and neighbourhood watch groups on matters of crime, security, and traffic. The parish council's role also includes initiating projects for the maintenance and repair of parish facilities, as well as consulting with the district council on the maintenance, repair, and improvement of highways, drainage, footpaths, public transport, and street cleaning. Conservation matters (including trees and listed buildings) and environmental issues are also the responsibility of the council.

For local government purposes, since 1 April 2023, the parish comes under the unitary authority of Somerset Council. Prior to this, it was part of the non-metropolitan district of Somerset West and Taunton (formed on 1 April 2019) and, before this, the district of West Somerset (established under the Local Government Act 1972). It was part of Williton Rural District before 1974.

It is also part of the Tiverton and Minehead county constituency represented in the House of Commons of the Parliament of the United Kingdom. It elects one Member of Parliament (MP) by the first past the post system of election.

== Religious sites ==
The Church of All Saints dates from the 13th century and has been designated by English Heritage as a grade I listed building.

== See also ==
- Sir Thomas Courtenay (1315–1356) of Wootton Courtenay.
