= Quantoxhead =

Quantoxhead may refer to:

- East Quantoxhead, Somerset, England
- West Quantoxhead, Somerset, England
