= Exton, Somerset =

Village and civil parish in England

Coordinates: 51.0907°N 3.5363°W

Exton
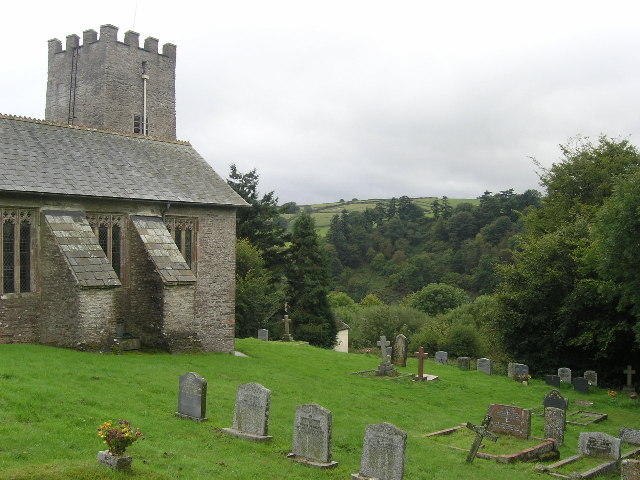
- St Peter's Church

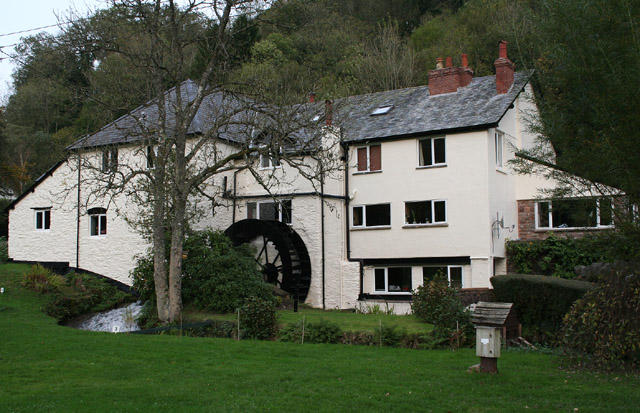
- Bridgetown Mill

- Location within Somerset
- Population: 243 (2011)
- OS grid reference: SS925335
- Unitary authority: Somerset Council
- Ceremonial county: Somerset
- Region: South West
- Country: England
- Sovereign state: United Kingdom
- Post town: DULVERTON
- Postcode district: TA22
- Dialling code: 01643
- Police: Avon and Somerset
- Fire: Devon and Somerset
- Ambulance: South Western
- UK Parliament: Tiverton and Minehead

Exton is a village and civil parish 5 miles (8 km) north-east of Dulverton and 9 miles (14 km) south-west of Dunster in Somerset, England. It lies on the River Exe on Exmoor. The parish includes the village of Bridgetown and covers 2,017 ha, all of which is within the national park.

== History ==
The parish of Exton was part of the Williton and Freemanners Hundred.

Edbrooke Bridge over the River Exe is medieval in origin.

Siderfin's Estate Act 1698
- Act of Parliament
- Parliament of England
- Long title: An Act for vesting the Manor of Exton, and other Lands in the County of Somerset, late the Estate of Thomas Siderfin Esquire deceased, in Trustees, to be sold, for Payment of Debts.
- Citation: 11 Will. 3. c. 10 Pr.
- Territorial extent: England and Wales

Dates
- Royal assent: 11 April 1700

Status: Current legislation

In the Middle Ages the manor passed with the forestership of the Royal Forest of Exmoor, later being owned by the Rolles and then the Siderfins of Croydon who sold it in 1700, following a private act of Parliament, Siderfin's Estate Act 1698 (11 Will. 3. c. 10 Pr.).

== Governance ==
The parish council has responsibility for local issues, including setting an annual precept (local rate) to cover the council's operating costs and producing annual accounts for public scrutiny. The parish council evaluates local planning applications and works with the local police, district council officers, and neighbourhood watch groups on matters of crime, security, and traffic. The parish council's role also includes initiating projects for the maintenance and repair of parish facilities, as well as consulting with the district council on the maintenance, repair, and improvement of highways, drainage, footpaths, public transport, and street cleaning. Conservation matters (including trees and listed buildings) and environmental issues are also the responsibility of the council.

For local government purposes, since 1 April 2023, the parish comes under the unitary authority of Somerset Council. Prior to this, it was part of the non-metropolitan district of Somerset West and Taunton (formed on 1 April 2019) and, before this, the district of West Somerset (established under the Local Government Act 1972). It was part of Dulverton Rural District before 1974.

As Exton falls within the Exmoor National Park some functions normally administered by district or county councils have, since 1997, fallen under the Exmoor National Park Authority, which is known as a 'single purpose' authority, which aims to "conserve and enhance the natural beauty, wildlife and cultural heritage of the National Parks" and "promote opportunities for the understanding and enjoyment of the special qualities of the Parks by the public", including responsibility for the conservation of the historic environment.

It is also part of the Tiverton and Minehead county constituency represented in the House of Commons of the Parliament of the United Kingdom. It elects one Member of Parliament (MP) by the first past the post system of election.

== Religious sites ==
The Norman Church of St Peter has a 13th-century tower and has been designated by English Heritage as a Grade II* listed building.
