= Cutcombe =

Place in Somerset, England

Coordinates: 51.1417°N 3.5312°W

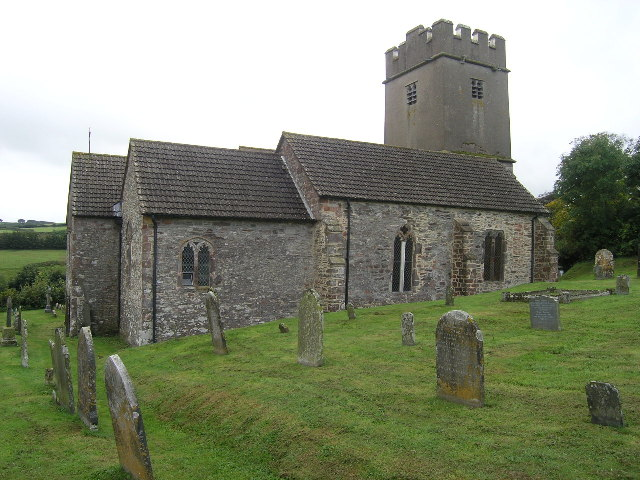
- Church of St John, Cutcombe

- Location within Somerset
- Population: 361 (2011)
- OS grid reference: SS929391
- Unitary authority: Somerset Council
- Ceremonial county: Somerset
- Region: South West
- Country: England
- Sovereign state: United Kingdom
- Post town: MINEHEAD
- Postcode district: TA24
- Dialling code: 01643
- Police: Avon and Somerset
- Fire: Devon and Somerset
- Ambulance: South Western
- UK Parliament: Tiverton and Minehead

Cutcombe is a village and civil parish 9 miles (14 km) south of Minehead and north of Dulverton straddling the ridge between Exmoor and the Brendon Hills in Somerset. It has a population of 361.

The parish includes the hamlet of Wheddon Cross which is one of the higher hamlets within the Exmoor National Park at 980 feet (299 m) above sea level, the highest being Simonsbath.

== History ==
Cutcombe comes from Old English meaning Cuda's valley and was granted after the Norman Conquest to William de Mohun of Dunster.

Cutcombe was part of the hundred of Carhampton.

Cutcombe Market has been a long established livestock market. A partnership involving Somerset County Council, Exmoor National Park Authority, the South West of England Regional Development Agency and West Somerset Council put together plans to revitalise the market and add housing, industrial units and an Exmoor National Park Interpretation Centre on the site. Somerset Rural Renaissance Partnership have invested over £300,000 towards the project which was expected to complete in 2011.

== Governance ==
The parish council has responsibility for local issues, including setting an annual precept (local rate) to cover the council's operating costs and producing annual accounts for public scrutiny. The parish council evaluates local planning applications and works with the local police, district council officers, and neighbourhood watch groups on matters of crime, security, and traffic. The parish council's role also includes initiating projects for the maintenance and repair of parish facilities, as well as consulting with the district council on the maintenance, repair, and improvement of highways, drainage, footpaths, public transport, and street cleaning. Conservation matters (including trees and listed buildings) and environmental issues are also the responsibility of the council.

For local government purposes, since 1 April 2023, the parish comes under the unitary authority of Somerset Council. Prior to this, it was part of the non-metropolitan district of Somerset West and Taunton (formed on 1 April 2019) and, before this, the district of West Somerset (established under the Local Government Act 1972). It was part of Williton Rural District before 1974.

Cutcombe is also part of the Tiverton and Minehead county constituency represented in the House of Commons of the Parliament of the United Kingdom. It elects one Member of Parliament (MP) by the first past the post system of election.

== Religious sites ==
The parish church of St John has a 13th-century tower and has been designated by English Heritage as a Grade II* listed building.
