= Timberscombe =

Village and civil parish in Somerset, England

Coordinates: 51.1382°N 3.5389°W

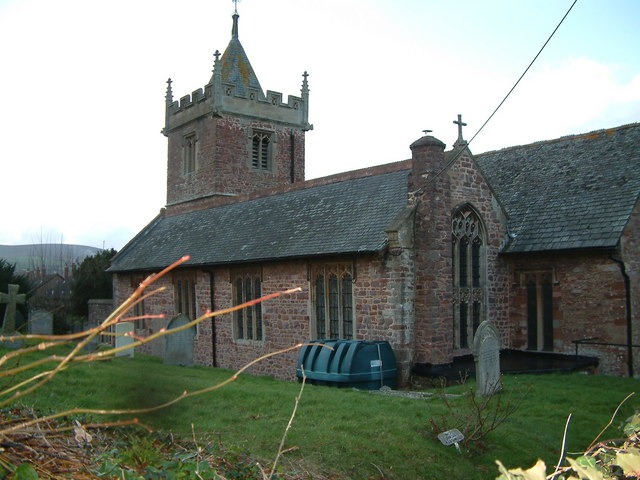
- St. Petrock's church

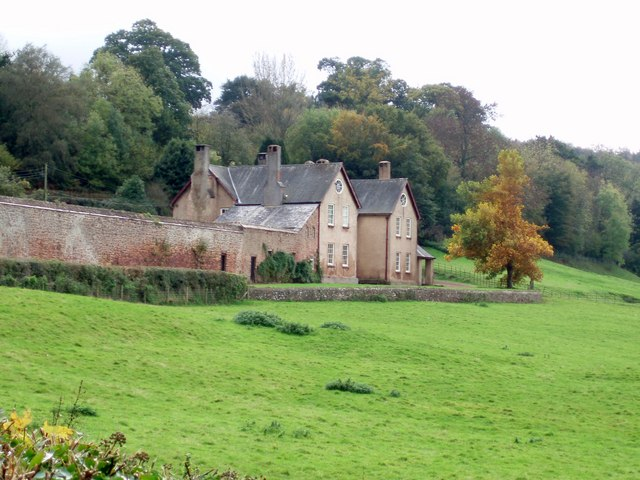
- Bickham

- Location within Somerset
- Population: 402 (2011)
- OS grid reference: SS924387
- Unitary authority: Somerset Council
- Ceremonial county: Somerset
- Region: South West
- Country: England
- Sovereign state: United Kingdom
- Post town: MINEHEAD
- Postcode district: TA24
- Dialling code: 01643
- Police: Avon and Somerset
- Fire: Devon and Somerset
- Ambulance: South Western
- UK Parliament: Tiverton and Minehead

Timberscombe is a village and civil parish on the River Avill 2.5 miles (4 km) south-west of Dunster, and 5.5 miles (9 km) south of Minehead within the Exmoor National Park in Somerset, England. The parish includes the hamlet of Bickham.

== History ==
The parish was part of the hundred of Carhampton.

== Governance ==
The parish council has responsibility for local issues, including setting an annual precept (local rate) to cover the council's operating costs and producing annual accounts for public scrutiny. The parish council evaluates local planning applications and works with the local police, district council officers, and neighbourhood watch groups on matters of crime, security, and traffic. The parish council's role also includes initiating projects for the maintenance and repair of parish facilities, as well as consulting with the district council on the maintenance, repair, and improvement of highways, drainage, footpaths, public transport, and street cleaning. Conservation matters (including trees and listed buildings) and environmental issues are also the responsibility of the council.

For local government purposes, since 1 April 2023, the parish comes under the unitary authority of Somerset Council. Prior to this, it was part of the non-metropolitan district of Somerset West and Taunton (formed on 1 April 2019) and, before this, the district of West Somerset (established under the Local Government Act 1972). It was part of Williton Rural District before 1974.

It is also part of the Tiverton and Minehead county constituency represented in the House of Commons of the Parliament of the United Kingdom. It elects one Member of Parliament (MP) by the first past the post system of election.

== Geography ==
The 13 hectares (32 acres) Bickham Wood, which is run as a nature reserve by the Somerset Wildlife Trust, comprises very wet, ancient, semi-natural woodland on the edge of the Brendon Hills Area of Outstanding Natural Beauty.

== Landmarks ==
Timberscombe has many attractions including an Iron Age Fort, the lost village of Clicket and Cowbridge Sawmill, which has been restored as a working vintage sawmill. The village is a popular tourist area and provides ample bed and breakfast accommodation and holiday lets. The beautiful countryside makes it particularly popular with walkers, horse riders and cyclists.

== Religious sites ==
The church is dedicated to Saint Petroc, who probably visited the parish in the 6th century. The church has a 15th-century tower, the rest of the building dating from 1708. It has been designated by English Heritage as a Grade I listed building.

== Notable residents ==
- J. P. Martin (1879–1966) Methodist minister and children's author
- T.C. Lethbridge (1901-1971) Anglo-Saxon archaeologist lived as a child in Knowle House
- Lord Justice Farwell - Sir George Farwell (1845 –1915) was an English judge, noted for trying the Taff Vale case at the first instance.
