= Bicknoller =

Village and civil parish in Somerset, England

Coordinates: 51.149°N 3.272°W

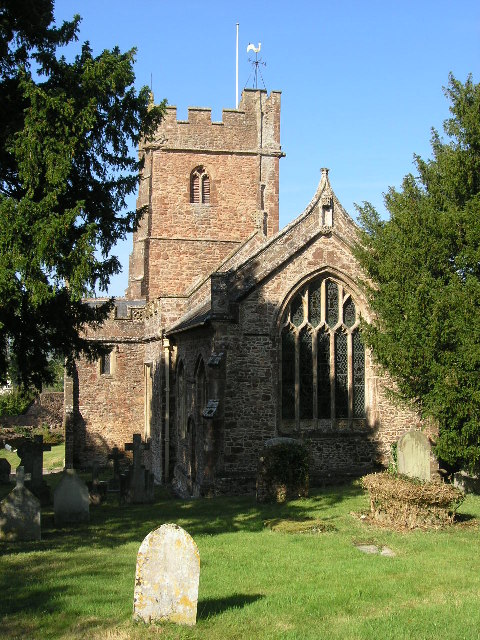
- St George's Church, Bicknoller

- Location within Somerset
- Population: 373 (in 2021)
- OS grid reference: ST110396
- Civil parish: Bicknoller
- Unitary authority: Somerset Council
- Ceremonial county: Somerset
- Region: South West
- Country: England
- Sovereign state: United Kingdom
- Post town: TAUNTON
- Postcode district: TA4
- Dialling code: 01984
- Police: Avon and Somerset
- Fire: Devon and Somerset
- Ambulance: South Western
- UK Parliament: Tiverton and Minehead
- Website: Parish Council

Bicknoller is a village and civil parish on the western slopes of the Quantock Hills in the English county of Somerset. The parish includes the hamlets of Culverhays, Halsway, Newton and Woolston. At the 2021 census, the parish had a population of 373.

The village is on the routes of the Coleridge Way and the Macmillan Way West.

== History ==
Above the village lies Trendle Ring, an Iron Age settlement.

The parish of Bicknoller was part of the Williton and Freemanners Hundred.

The village was known in 1291 as Bykenalre which means "Bica's alder tree".

From 1430 to 1857, the manor was held by Wells Cathedral.

== Governance ==
The parish council has responsibility for local issues, including setting an annual precept (local rate) to cover the council's operating costs and producing annual accounts for public scrutiny. The parish council evaluates local planning applications and works with the local police, district council officers, and neighbourhood watch groups on matters of crime, security, and traffic. The parish council's role also includes initiating projects for the maintenance and repair of parish facilities, as well as consulting with the district council on the maintenance, repair, and improvement of highways, drainage, footpaths, public transport, and street cleaning. Conservation matters (including trees and listed buildings) and environmental issues are also the responsibility of the council.

For local government purposes, since 1 April 2023, the parish comes under the unitary authority of Somerset Council. Prior to this, it was part of the non-metropolitan district of Somerset West and Taunton (formed on 1 April 2019) and, before this, the district of West Somerset (established under the Local Government Act 1972). It was part of Williton Rural District before 1974.

It is also part of the Tiverton and Minehead county constituency represented in the House of Commons of the Parliament of the United Kingdom. It elects one Member of Parliament (MP) by the first past the post system of election.

== Religious sites ==
The Church of St George, a Grade I listed building, dates in part from the 12th century and is dominated by a huge elm tree in its grounds. The church is decorated with a collection of carved angels and nightmarish animal heads. There is a memorial to William Temple, Archbishop of Canterbury, who spent his holidays in the village from 1933 to 1944.

== Landmarks ==
Although it is closer to the neighbouring village of Halsway, Halsway Manor falls within the parish of Bicknoller. It is a manor house, now used as England's National Centre for Traditional Music, Dance and Song. The eastern end of the building dates from the fifteenth century; the western end is a nineteenth-century addition. The manor, which is mentioned in the Domesday Book, was built by Cardinal Beaufort as a hunting lodge. At one point it was occupied by insurrectionist Jack Cade. Thereafter it was a family home until the mid-1960s, when it became the folk music centre. It has been designated by English Heritage as a Grade II* listed building.

Thorncombe House was built in 1744 by the Sweeting family, but has since had a 19th-century facade added. It is Grade II listed.

== Notable people ==
Bicknoller was the birthplace of the Somerset and England cricketer Harold Gimblett.
