= East Quantoxhead =

Village in Somerset, England

Coordinates: 51.1838°N 3.2395°W

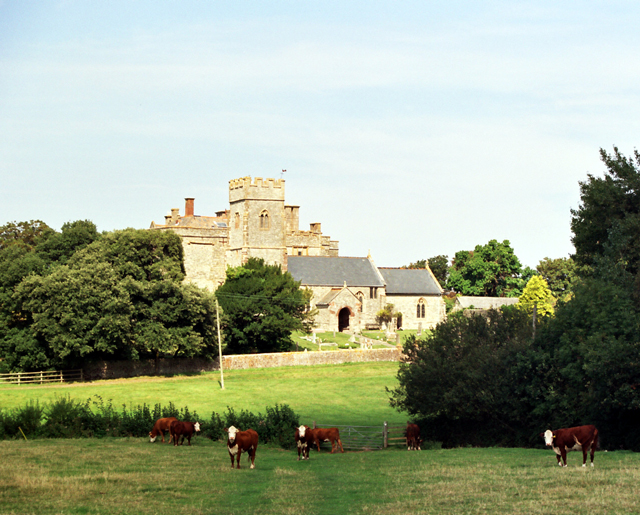
- East Quantoxhead Church

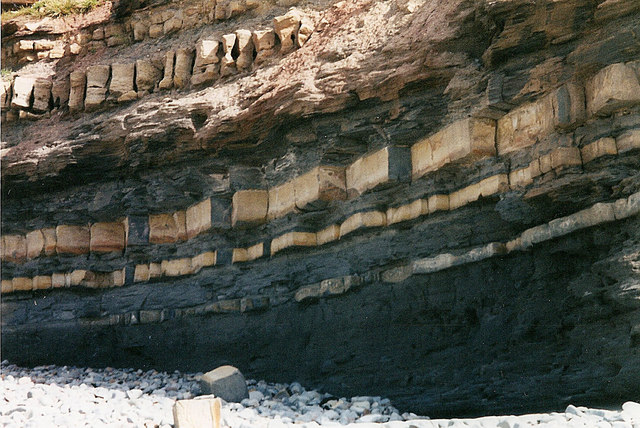
- Cliff Face East Quantoxhead

- Location within Somerset
- Population: 104 (2011)
- OS grid reference: ST134434
- Unitary authority: Somerset Council
- Ceremonial county: Somerset
- Region: South West
- Country: England
- Sovereign state: United Kingdom
- Post town: BRIDGWATER
- Postcode district: TA5
- Dialling code: 01278
- Police: Avon and Somerset
- Fire: Devon and Somerset
- Ambulance: South Western
- UK Parliament: Tiverton and Minehead

East Quantoxhead is a village, 3 miles (5 km) from West Quantoxhead, 4 miles (6 km) east of Williton, and 13 miles (21 km) west of Bridgwater, within the Quantock Hills Area of Outstanding Natural Beauty in Somerset, England.

== History ==
Above the village at Black Ball Camp are an Iron Age hill fort and evidence of Bronze Age burials.

The parish of East Quantoxhead was part of the Williton and Freemanners Hundred.

The village has a manor house, thatched cottages, medieval tithe barn, its own duck pond, and mill house dating from 1725. The manor house, known as Court House, has a medieval tower and other parts of the building which date from the 17th century. It has been designated as a grade I listed building. The manor was granted to Ralph Pagnall after the Norman Conquest passing down through generations to the Luttrells. No part of the estate has been sold since its grant around 1070 and is still owned by the descendants of the Paganel and Luttrell families. This required a special act of parliament in the 1920s to enable council houses to be built on land which was not freehold, contrary to the rules in the rest of the country.

The village used to have a small harbour which brought in limestone for local limekilns and exported alabaster. It is thought that it was also used for smuggling.

At some time before 1725 Perry Hill was the site of a copper mine.

== Governance ==
The parish council has responsibility for local issues, including setting an annual precept (local rate) to cover the council's operating costs and producing annual accounts for public scrutiny. The parish council evaluates local planning applications and works with the local police, district council officers, and neighbourhood watch groups on matters of crime, security, and traffic. The parish council's role also includes initiating projects for the maintenance and repair of parish facilities, as well as consulting with the district council on the maintenance, repair, and improvement of highways, drainage, footpaths, public transport, and street cleaning. Conservation matters (including trees and listed buildings) and environmental issues are also the responsibility of the council.

For local government purposes, since 1 April 2023, the parish comes under the unitary authority of Somerset Council. Prior to this, it was part of the non-metropolitan district of Somerset West and Taunton (formed on 1 April 2019) and, before this, the district of West Somerset (established under the Local Government Act 1972). It was part of Williton Rural District before 1974.

It is also part of the Tiverton and Minehead county constituency represented in the House of Commons of the Parliament of the United Kingdom. It elects one member of parliament (MP) by the first past the post system of election.

== Religious sites ==
The church is dedicated to St Mary, and parts date back to the 14th century. There is a canonical sundial on the south wall. The wooden pulpit dates from 1633. The church has been designated by English Heritage as a Grade II* listed building.

== Notable inhabitants ==
The village was the birthplace of Sarah Biffen (October 1784 – 2 October 1850), a Victorian English painter born with no arms. She was 37 inches (94 cm) tall. The village was also home to Walter Luttrell a local landowner and veteran of World War II who donated Dunster Castle to the National Trust and was appointed Lord Lieutenant of Somerset.

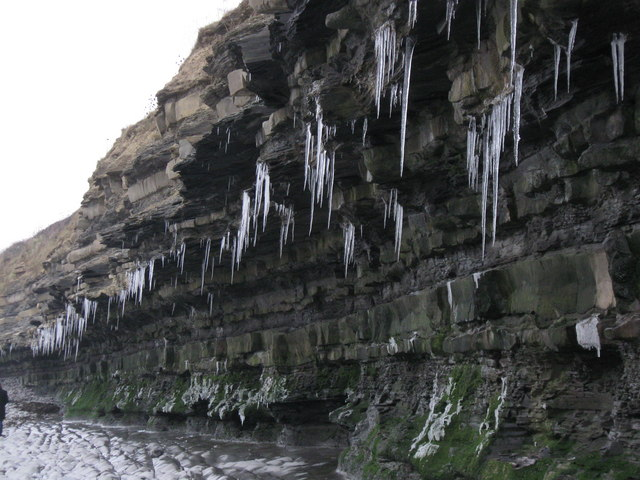
East Quantoxhead cliffs

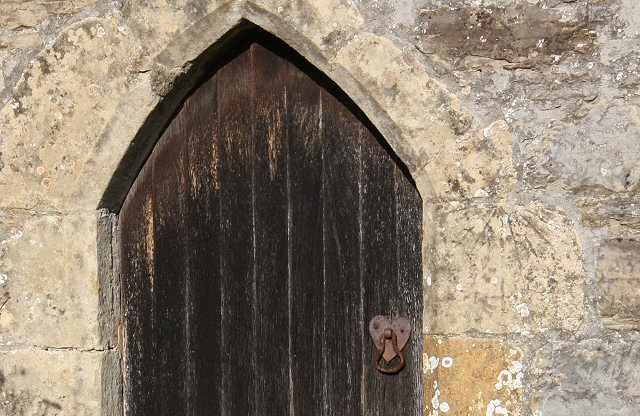
Scratch dial at church gate

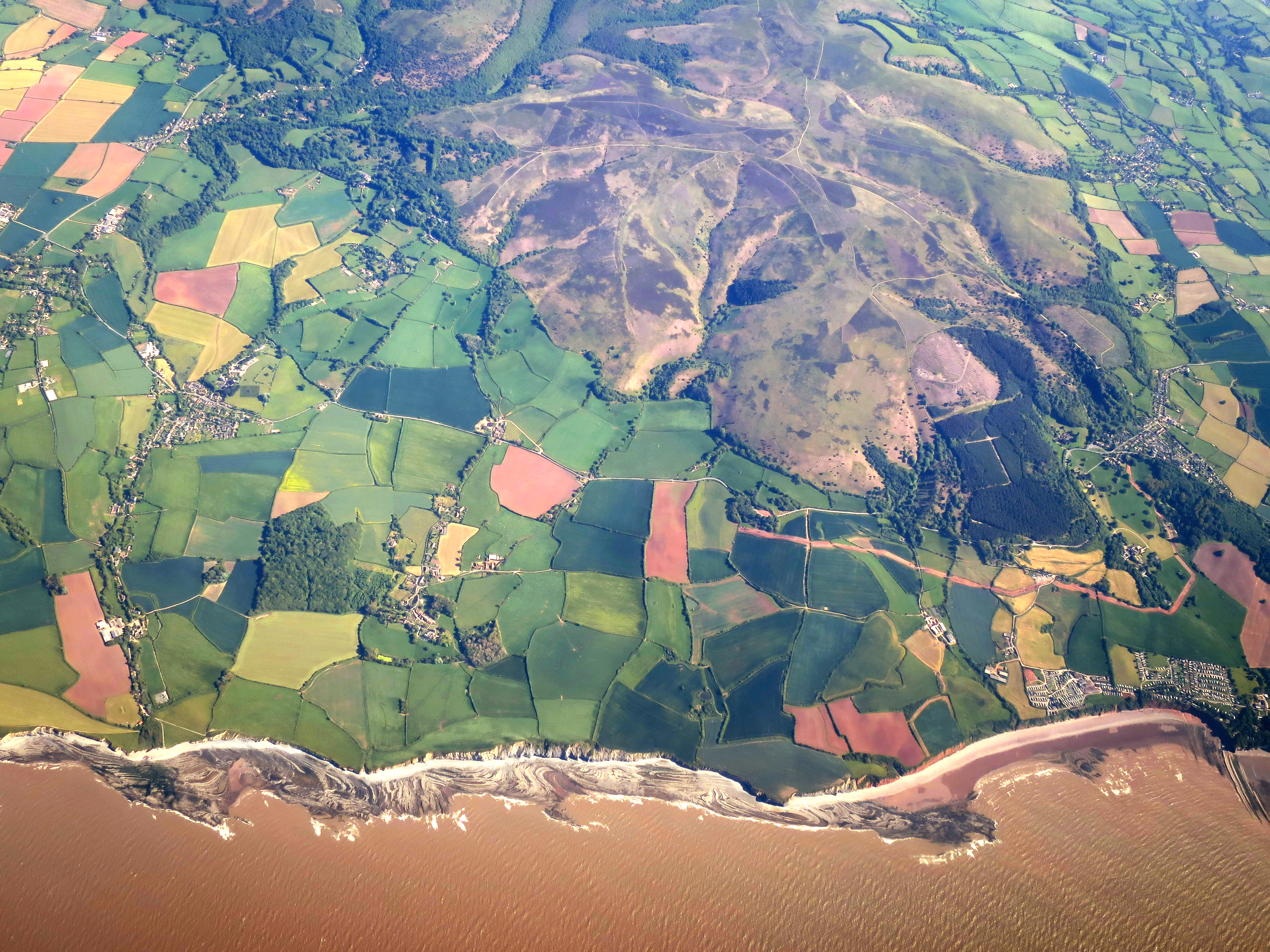
Aerial view of area around East Quantoxhead, which is just left of centre.
