= 2011 West Somerset District Council election =

2011 UK local government election

Map of the results of the 2011 West Somerset District Council election. Conservatives in blue, independents in grey and Labour in red.

The 2011 West Somerset District Council election took place on 5 May 2011 to elect members of West Somerset District Council in Somerset, England. The whole council was up for election with boundary changes since the last election in 2007 reducing the number of seats by 3. The Conservative Party gained overall control of the council from Independents.

== Background ==
Before the election Conservative Tim Taylor was the leader of the council in an alliance with Independents. Since the 2007 election boundary changes reduced the number of seats on the council from 31 to 28.

A total of 63 candidates stood at the election for the 28 seats on the council. These included 15 sitting councillors and a record 12 Green Party candidates, a party that had not contested any seats in West Somerset in 2007. This was compared to only 4 Labour Party and 2 Liberal Democrat candidates, with the number of Green candidates being put down to the proposal for a new nuclear power plant at Hinkley Point. One seat, Greater Exmoor, only had one candidate, Conservative Steven Pugsley, so he was elected without opposition.

== Election result ==
The Conservatives took control of the council with 19 councillors after gaining 6 seats. This was mainly at the expense of Independents who dropped 9 seats, with only 7 independents being elected. The independent losses included the defeat of councillors Sandra Slade and Paul Tipney in Minehead South and Quantock Vale respectively.

The Labour Party gained a seat to move to 2 councillors, while the Liberal Democrats lost their only seat on the council and the Greens failed to win any seats.

West Somerset local election result 2011
Party	Seats	Gains	Losses	Net gain/loss	Seats %	Votes %	Votes	+/−
Conservative	19			+6	67.9	47.4	10,486	+4.4%
Independent	7			-9	25.0	32.4	7,169	-15.6%
Labour	2			+1	7.1	7.0	1,548	+1.6%
Green	0			0	0	11.1	2,449	+11.1%
Liberal Democrats	0			-1	0	2.2	479	-1.4%

== Ward results ==
Alcombe (2)
Party	Candidate	Votes	%	±%
Independent	Ian Melhuish	409		
Conservative	Paul Grierson	357		
Labour	Andy Lewis	280		
Green	Venetia Moore	200		
Turnout		1,246	33.6	

Brendon Hills
Party	Candidate	Votes	%	±%
Conservative	Keith Turner	456	74.3	
Independent	Nick Moore	158	25.7	
Majority		298	48.6	
Turnout		614	51.6	

Carhampton & Withycombe
Party	Candidate	Votes	%	±%
Conservative	Timothy Taylor	382	66.3	
Independent	William Butcher	194	33.7	
Majority		188	32.6	
Turnout		576	51.0	

Crowcombe & Stogumber
Party	Candidate	Votes	%	±%
Conservative	Anthony Trollope-Bellew	373	54.8	
Independent	Roy Harbour	178	26.1	
Green	Jamie Robertson	130	19.1	
Majority		195	28.7	
Turnout		681	53.4	

Dulverton & District (2)
Party	Candidate	Votes	%	±%
Independent	Keith Ross	736		
Conservative	Bruce Heywood	543		
Independent	David Lungley	450		
Conservative	Kathy Smith	434		
Turnout		2,163	51.3	

Dunster & Timberscombe
Party	Candidate	Votes	%	±%
Conservative	Alec Chick	336	57.9	
Green	Nicky Gibbard	166	28.6	
Independent	Gary Miele	78	13.4	
Majority		170	29.3	
Turnout		580	47.5	

Greater Exmoor
Party	Candidate	Votes	%	±%
Conservative	Steven Pugsley	unopposed		

Minehead Central (3)
Party	Candidate	Votes	%	±%
Independent	Andrew Hadley	588		
Conservative	Mandy Chilcott	543		
Conservative	Richard Lillis	349		
Independent	Stephen Grice	302		
Labour	Lesley Culverhouse	298		
Independent	Ernest Taylor	247		
Independent	John Clyde-Smith	146		
Green	Cait Collins	137		
Green	Simon Gibbard	127		
Turnout		2,737	32.4	

Minehead North (2)
Party	Candidate	Votes	%	±%
Independent	David Ross	471		
Conservative	David Sanders	448		
Independent	Steve Pickard	220		
Green	Katy Attwater	218		
Turnout		1,357	29.4	

Minehead South (2)
Party	Candidate	Votes	%	±%
Conservative	Les Smith	520		
Labour	Maureen Smith	520		
Conservative	Tristan Tonks	365		
Independent	Sandra Slade	335		
Green	David Taylor	259		
Turnout		1,999	41.3	

Old Cleeve (2)
Party	Candidate	Votes	%	±%
Conservative	Kate Kravis	523		
Conservative	Martin Dewdney	423		
Green	Jude Johnson-Smith	304		
Liberal Democrats	Ian Galloway	219		
Green	David Latimer	178		
Turnout		1,647	46.0	

Porlock & District (2)
Party	Candidate	Votes	%	±%
Conservative	Karen Mills	683		
Independent	Jon Freeman	591		
Conservative	Nick Messarra	414		
Turnout		1,688	47.7	

Quantock Vale (2)
Party	Candidate	Votes	%	±%
Conservative	Chris Morgan	521		
Conservative	Sue Goss	442		
Independent	Paul Tipney	434		
Turnout		1,397	45.1	

Watchet (3)
Party	Candidate	Votes	%	±%
Conservative	David Westcott	669		
Conservative	Anthony Knight	637		
Labour	Peter Murphy	450		
Conservative	Ann Snelling	327		
Green	Izzy Silvester	297		
Independent	Loretta Whetlor	269		
Liberal Democrats	Anthony Bowden	260		
Green	Bruce Scott	259		
Independent	John Richards	238		
Turnout		3,406	38.5	

West Quantock
Party	Candidate	Votes	%	±%
Conservative	Geoffrey Dowding	417	70.6	
Green	Miriam Robertson	174	29.4	
Majority		243	41.2	
Turnout		591	53.8	

Williton (2)
Party	Candidate	Votes	%	±%
Independent	Hugh Davies	700		
Independent	Edwin May	425		
Conservative	Rosemary Woods	324		
Turnout		1,449	39.5	
