= Williton Rural District =

Former local government area in the UK

Coordinates: 51.165°N 3.309°W

- Area
  - 1911: 99,489 acres (402.62 km^{2})
  - 1961: 97,364 acres (394.02 km^{2})
- Population
  - 1911: 12,661
  - 1961: 14,025
- History
  - Created: 1894
  - Abolished: 1974
- Status: Rural district
  - HQ: Williton

Williton was a rural district in Somerset, England, from 1894 to 1974.

It was created in 1894 under the Local Government Act 1894.

In 1974 it was abolished under the Local Government Act 1972 when it became part of West Somerset.

The parishes which made up the Rural District included Bicknoller, Brompton Ralph, Carhampton, Clatworthy, Crowcombe, Cutcombe, Dunster, East Quantoxhead, Elworthy, Holford, Kilve, Luccombe, Luxborough, Minehead, Minehead Without, Monksilver, Nettlecombe, Oare, Old Cleeve, Porlock, Sampford Brett, Selworthy, Stogumber, Stogursey, Stringston, Timberscombe, Treborough, West Quantoxhead, Williton, Withycombe and Wootton Courtenay.
