= Church of St Etheldreda, West Quantoxhead =

Church in Somerset, England

Church of St Etheldreda
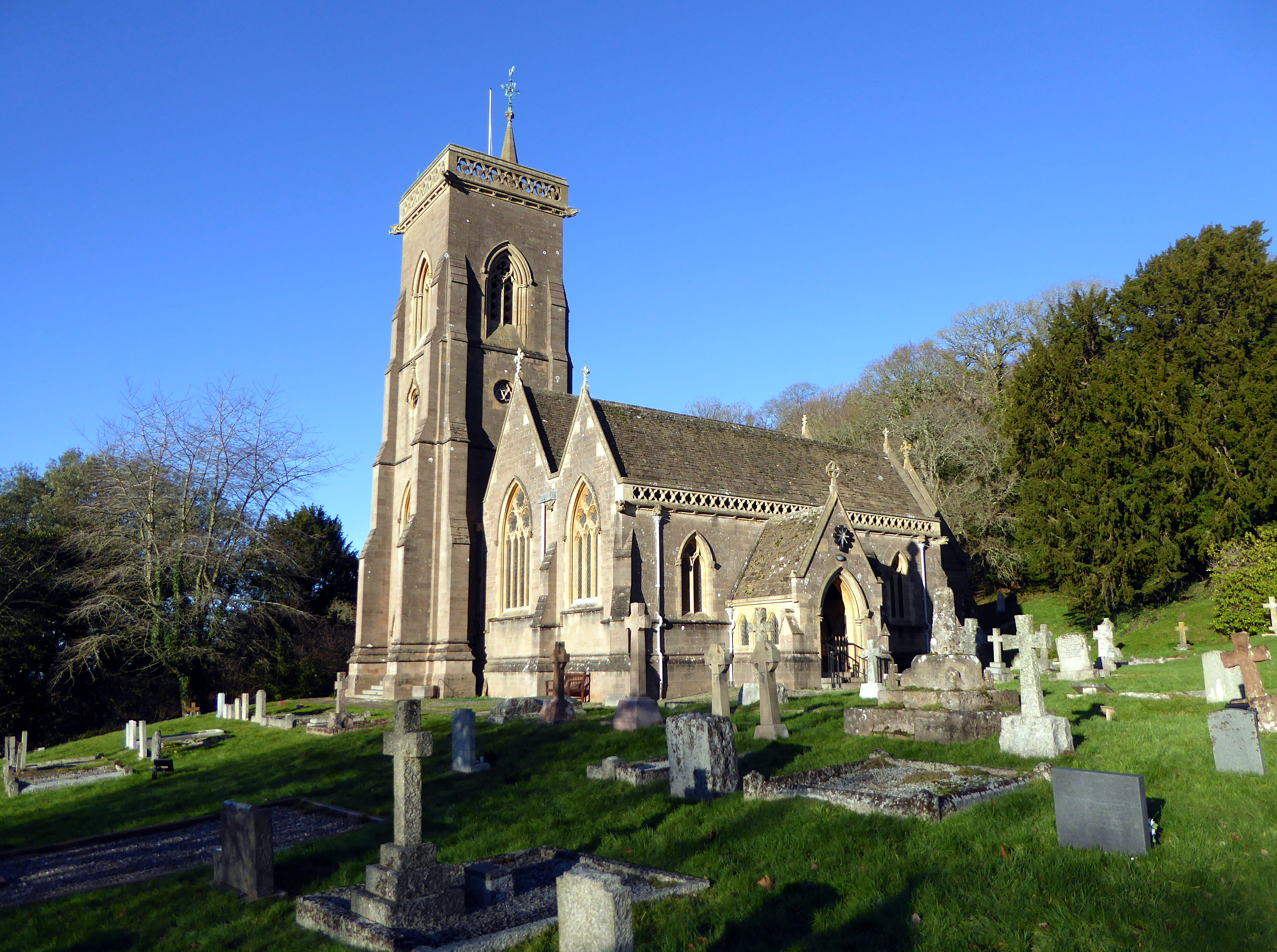

Religion
- Affiliation: Church of England
- Ecclesiastical or organizational status: Active
- Year consecrated: 1856

Location
- Location: West Quantoxhead, Somerset, England
- Interactive map of Church of St Etheldreda
- Coordinates: 51.1703°N 3.2697°W

Architecture
- Architect: John Norton
- Type: Church

The Church of St Etheldreda, also known as the Church of St Audries, is a Church of England parish church in West Quantoxhead, Somerset, England. Designed by John Norton, it was built in 1854-56 and is a Grade II* listed building.

== History ==
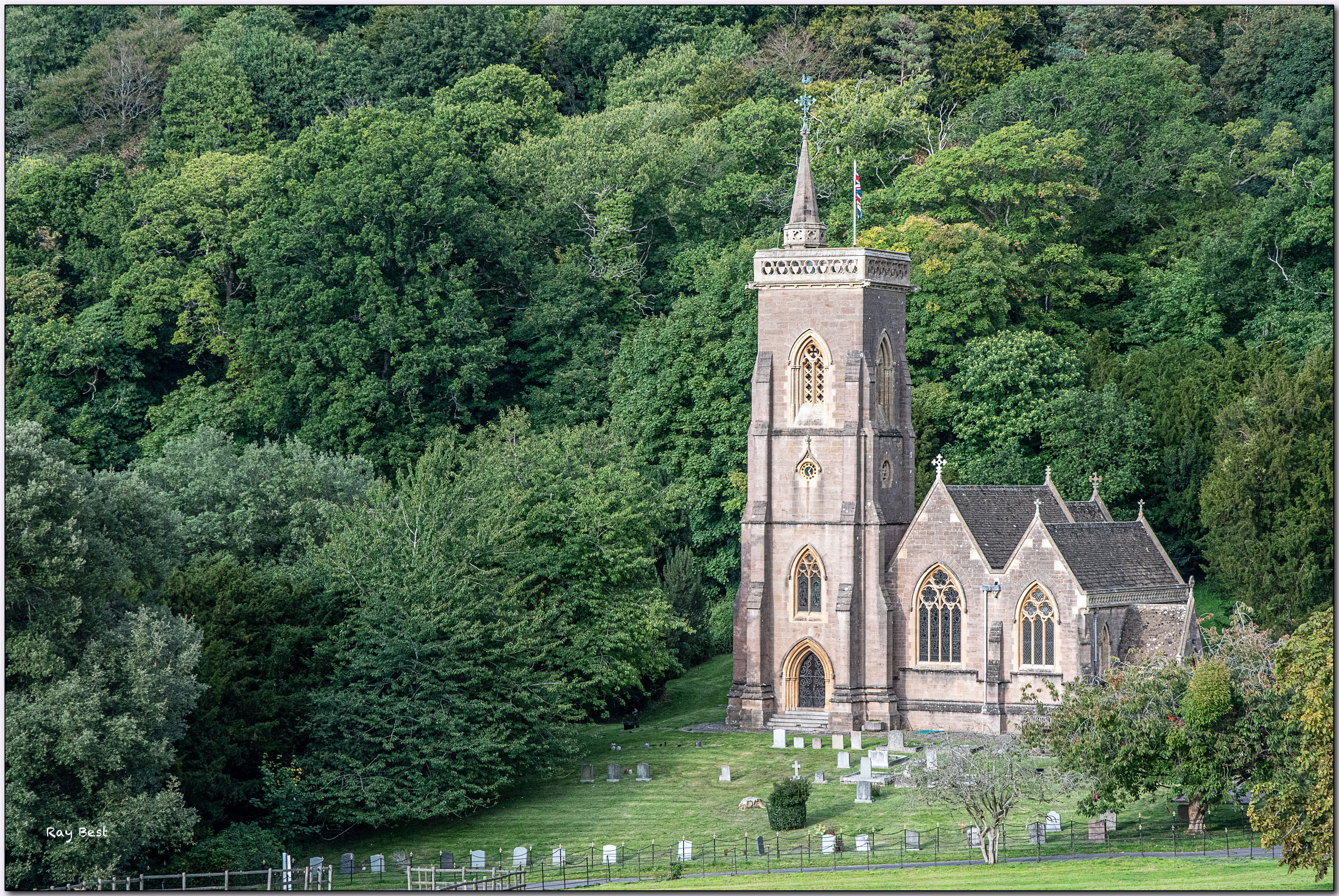
Church of St Etheldreda in 2022.

The Church of St Etheldreda was built on the site of an earlier church, which had a chancel dating to the 13th and 14th centuries, and a nave and tower of the 15th century. By the middle of the 19th century, the church had become dilapidated and was considered too small to adequately serve the local congregation. After a period of deliberation, Sir Alexander Fuller-Acland-Hood favoured building a new church rather than restoring the existing one, and plans were drawn up by John Norton of London. The cost of the church was covered by Sir Alexander and his father-in-law Sir Peregrine Acland, along with a £300 contribution from Mr. St. Aubyn.

The old church was demolished and construction of the new church began in 1853, with the foundation stone being laid by Sir Peregrine in October that year. Construction was carried out by workmen employed on the estate, under the supervision of Sir Peregrine, and the work using Doulting stone was carried out by Messrs Wall and Hook of Stroud. The church was consecrated by the Bishop of Bath and Wells, the Right Rev. Robert Eden, on 17 October 1856. It cost over £16,000 to complete.

While the new church was under construction, Sir Alexander had a wooden church erected to serve as a temporary place of worship. Once St Etheldreda's was completed, the wooden church was dismantled and later transported to Stolford in 1866, where it was erected as St Andrew's Mission Church. Despite its temporary nature, the church, now dedicated to St Peter's, remains as an active place of worship and Grade II listed building.

== Architecture ==
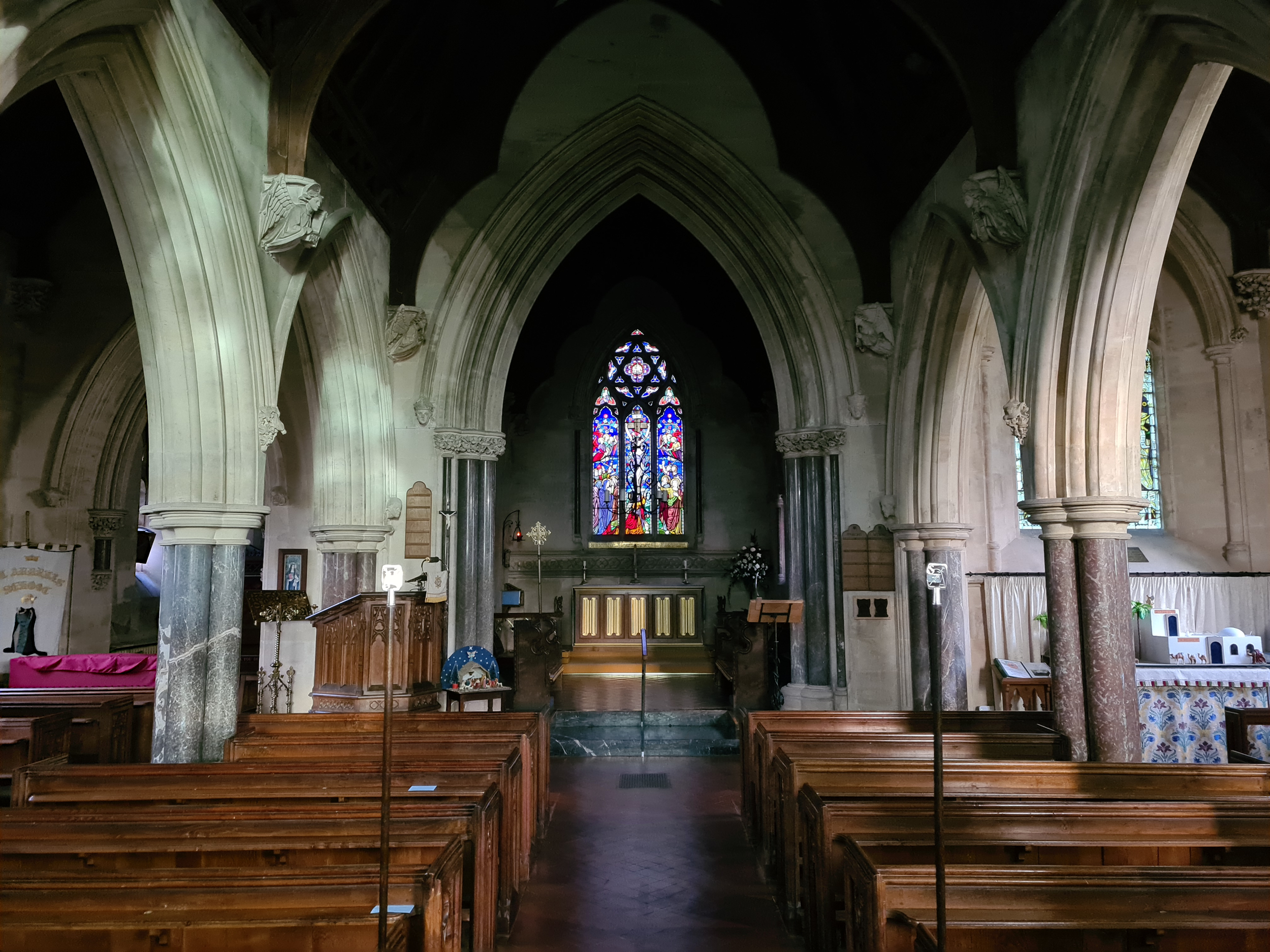
Interior of St Audries church

The church is built of local sandstone from Sampford Brett, with the windows and dressings in Doulting stone, piers of Babbacombe marble and slabs of Bath stone covering the roof. Designed in the Early Decorated style and able to accommodate 250 persons, the church is made up of a four-bay nave, north and south aisles, chancel, north chapel (used as an organ chamber and vestry), north-west tower (with baptistry underneath) and south porch. Approximately 1,000 tons of stone was used for the church's foundations and vaults, which were formed for the Acland, Hood and St. Aubyn families, with additional space for the family of the rector. The tower has a peal of five bells and a clock made by Dent of London. It is capped with a small spire and surmounted by a gilded cross and vane. The parapets of the tower contain shields with emblems of St Etheldreda, and monograms of the Acland and Hood families.

The church's wooden fittings were carved from oak sourced from Fairfield, the estate of Sir Acland. Many of them, including the pews, pulpit, reading desk, reredos and stalls in the chancel, were carved by Mr. Davis of Taunton. The octagonal font belonged to the previous church and dates to the 12th century. The carving of the interior stone corbels was carried out by Farmer of London. The passages of the nave was laid with Minton's tiles and the chancel laid with Minton's encaustic tiles. The stained glass windows in the chancel and north chapel were by O'Connor of London, and the small stained glass window in the baptistry by Messrs Hardman of Birmingham. The organ was supplied by Walker of London.

== Notable incumbents ==
The Preb John Richard Vernon was rector from 1874 until his death in 1902. He wrote several hymns and a number of popular religious works including The Harvest of a Quiet Eye: leisure thoughts for busy lives (1867).
