= Dulverton Rural District =

Rural district in Somerset, England

Coordinates: 51.046°N 3.549°W

- Area
  - 1911: 78,980
  - 1961: 78,980 acres (319.6 km^{2})
- Population
  - 1911: 4,897
  - 1961: 4,346
- History
  - Created: 1894
  - Abolished: 1974
- Status: Rural district
  - HQ: Dulverton

Dulverton was a rural district in Somerset, England, from 1894 to 1974.

It was created in 1894 under the Local Government Act 1894.

In 1974 it was abolished under the Local Government Act 1972 and responsibilities transferred to West Somerset.

The parishes that were part of the district included: Brompton Regis, Brushford, Dulverton, Exford, Exmoor, Exton, Huish Champflower, Skilgate, Upton, Winsford and Withypool and Hawkridge.

== See also ==
- Local Government Act 1972
