= Hundred of Williton and Freemanners =

Historical Hundred of Somerset, England

Williton and Freemanners Hundred
- Area
- 114,870 acres (46,490 ha)
- Status: Hundred
- Subdivisions
  - Type: Parishes
  - Units: Watchet, Doniford, Bicknoller, Brompton Ralph, Brompton Regis, Brushford, Chipstable, Clatworthy, Old Cleeve, Crowcombe, St Decuman, Dodington, Dulverton, Elworthy, Exmoor Forest, Exton, Halse, Hawkridge, Huish Champflower, Kilton, Kilve, Lilstock, Monksilver, Nettlecombe, East Quantoxhead, West Quantoxhead, Raddington, Sampford Brett, Skilgate, Stogumber, Nether Stowey, Upton, Winsford, and Withypoole.

The Hundred of Williton and Freemanners (also written as Freemanors) is one of the 40 historical Hundreds in the ceremonial county of Somerset, England, dating from before the Norman conquest during the Anglo-Saxon era although exact dates are unknown. Each hundred had a 'fyrd', which acted as the local defence force and a court which was responsible for the maintenance of the frankpledge system. They also formed a unit for the collection of taxes. The role of the hundred court was described in the Dooms (laws) of King Edgar. The name of the hundred was normally that of its meeting-place.

The Hundred of Williton and Freemanners consisted of Watchet the ancient parishes of: Bicknoller, Brompton Ralph, Brompton Regis, Brushford, Chipstable, Clatworthy, Old Cleeve, Crowcombe, St Decuman, Dodington, Dulverton, Elworthy, Exmoor Forest, Exton, Halse, Hawkridge, Huish Champflower, Kilton, Kilve, Lilstock, Monksilver, Nettlecombe, East Quantoxhead, West Quantoxhead, Raddington, Sampford Brett, Skilgate, Stogumber, Nether Stowey, Upton, Winsford, and Withypoole it also has the hands of Doniford a settlement in Watchet. It covered an area of 114,870 acres (46,490 ha).

At the time of the Domesday Book Williton and Dulverton were separate Hundreds. These were brought together with Winsford and Old Cleeve.

The importance of the hundred courts declined from the seventeenth century. By the 19th century several different single-purpose subdivisions of counties, such as poor law unions, sanitary districts, and highway districts sprang up, filling the administrative role previously played by parishes and hundreds. Although the Hundreds have never been formally abolished, their functions ended with the establishment of county courts in 1867 and the introduction of districts by the Local Government Act 1894.
