= St Mary's Church, Luxborough =

Church in Somerset, England

St Mary's Church
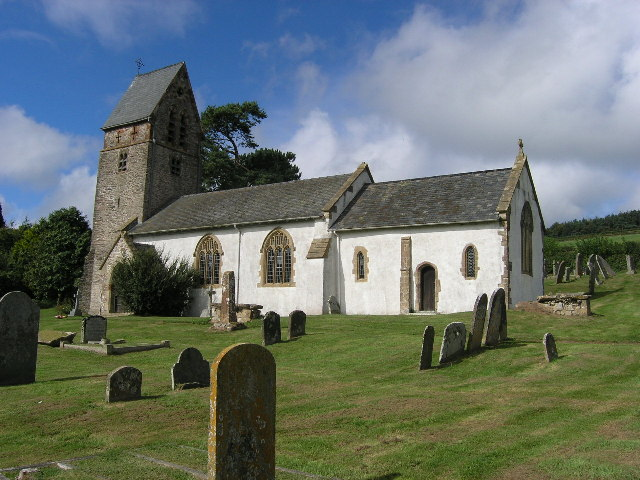

- Location within Somerset
- 51°07′56″N 3°28′05″W
- Location: Luxborough, Somerset, England

Listed Building – Grade II
- Official name: Church of St Mary
- Designated: 22 May 1969
- Reference no.: 1345725

Scheduled monument
- Official name: Cross in the churchyard of St Mary's Church
- Designated: 12 November 2003
- Reference no.: 1021155

Listed Building – Grade II
- Official name: Remains of churchyard cross, about 7 metres south of chancel, Church of St Mary
- Designated: 5 June 1985
- Reference no.: 1057340

The Anglican St Mary's Church at Luxborough within the English county of Somerset dates from the 13th century. It is a Grade II listed building.

The chancel of the church was built in the 13th century. In the 15th century the lower stages of the tower were added. A Victorian restoration in 1861 added the north aisle and added the upper part of the three-stage tower. Further restoration was undertaken in the 1970s.

Within the churchyard is a medieval inscribed stone cross which is 1.6 metres (5 ft 3 in) high and stands on a partially buried plinth. It has been scheduled as an ancient monument. There are also several unidentified chest tombs.

The parish is part of the Exmoor benefice within the archdeaconry of Taunton.

== See also ==
- List of ecclesiastical parishes in the Diocese of Bath and Wells
