= Old Church of St James, Upton =

Church in Somerset, England

Old Church of St James
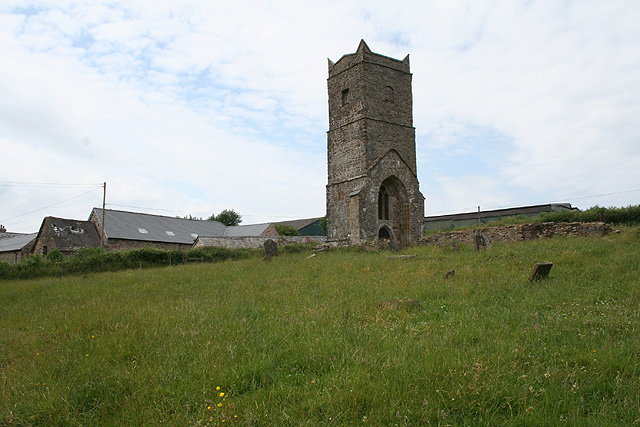

- Location within Somerset
- 51°03′19″N 3°27′34″W
- Location: Upton, Somerset, England

History
- Built: 14th century

Site notes
- Governing body: Churches Conservation Trust

Listed Building – Grade II*
- Official name: Remains of the Church of St James
- Designated: 8 April 1959
- Reference no.: 1248084

The Old St James's Church is a former church in the village of Upton, Somerset, England, of which only the tower remains, overlooking Wimbleball Lake. The tower is recorded in the National Heritage List for England as a designated Grade II* listed building, and is in the care of the Churches Conservation Trust. The church was declared redundant on 4 November 1971, and was vested in the Trust on 24 May 1973.

The church had a square chancel and rectangular nave, which together were 20.12 metres (66.0 ft) long and 3.96 metres (13.0 ft) wide.

The only parts of the 14th-century church which remain are from the lowest courses of the nave and chancel, and the tower, which has three stages and was unbuttressed, however a buttress was added to the south east corner in the 19th century. The tower was made safe in 1973.

The current parish church of St James was built in 1870 to replace this church, as it was considered too far from the village.

The bells from the church have been reused elsewhere including one at the St John the Baptist in Pitney and one in Green Point, New South Wales, Australia.

== See also ==
- List of churches preserved by the Churches Conservation Trust in South West England
