= Wimbleball Lake =

Reservoir in Somerset, England

Wimbleball Reservoir And Wimblebal Sailing ltd.
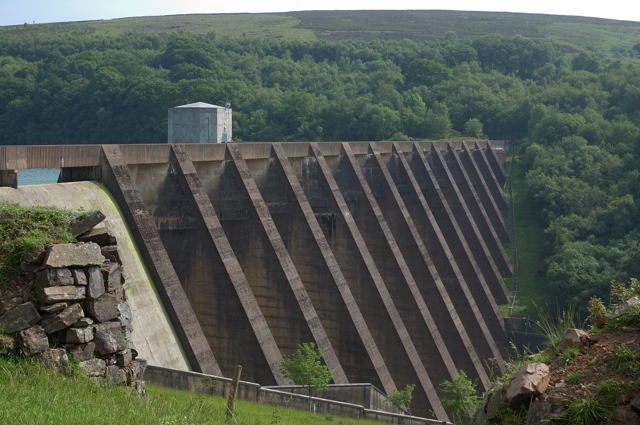
- The Dam

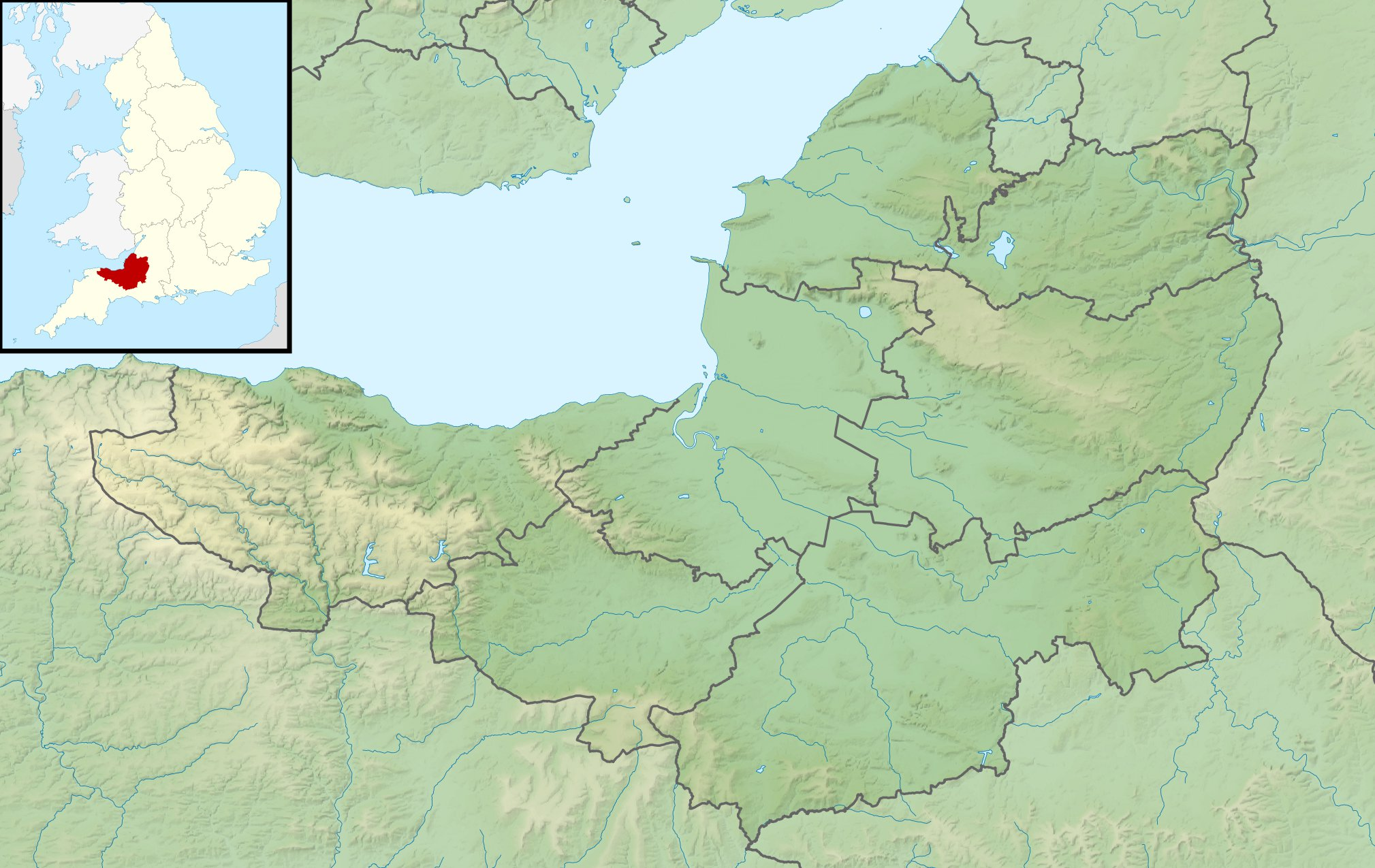
- Location within Somerset Location within the United Kingdom
- Location: Somerset
- Coordinates: 51°04′N 3°28′W
- Type: reservoir
- Primary inflows: River Haddeo
- Primary outflows: River Haddeo
- Basin countries: United Kingdom
- Surface area: 374 acres (1.51 km^{2})
- Average depth: 50 metres (160 ft)
- Water volume: 21,000 megalitres (17,000 acre⋅ft)

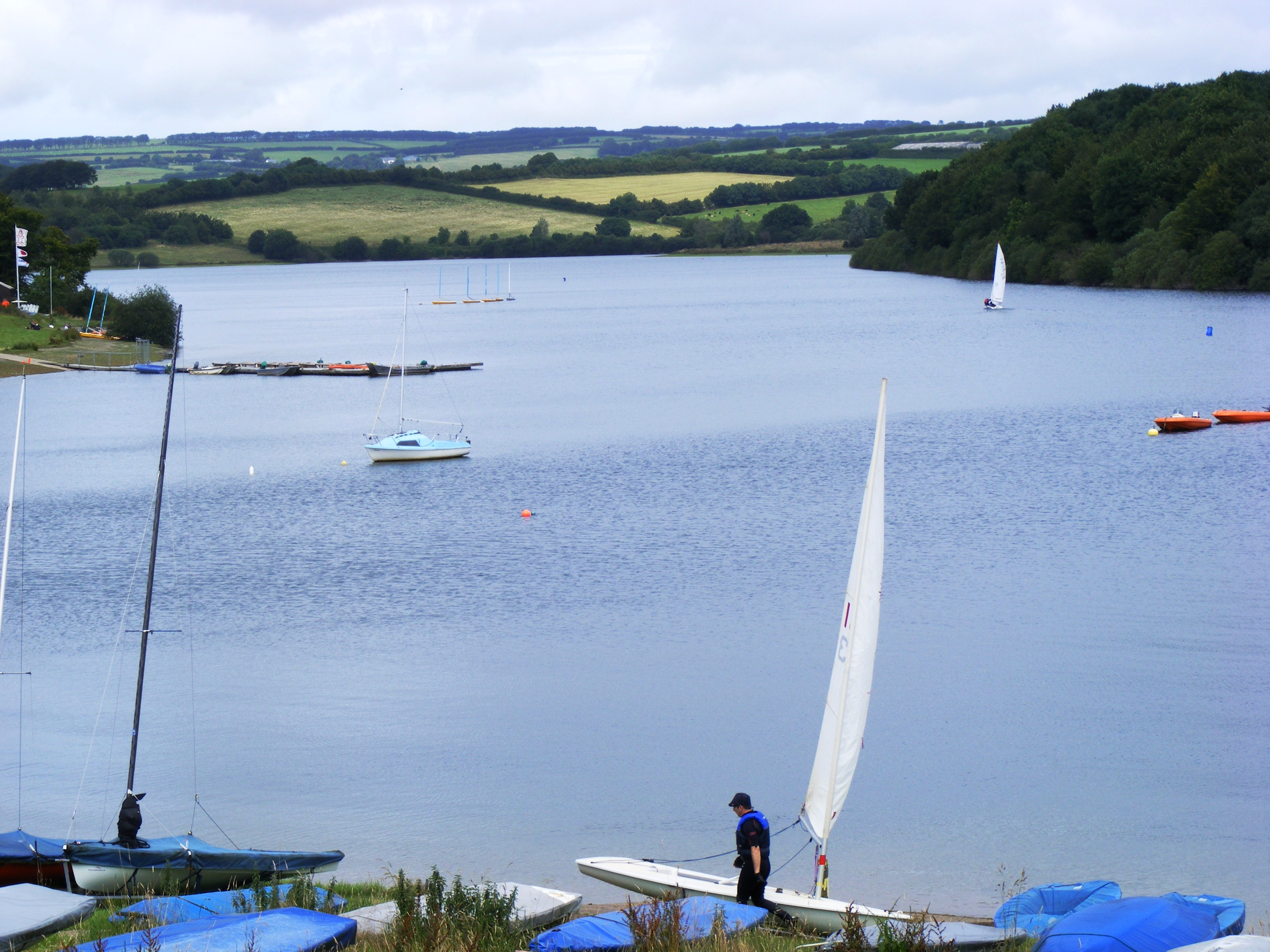
The view from the sailing club

Wimbleball Lake on Exmoor in Somerset, England, is a water supply reservoir constructed in the 1970s and completed in 1979.

The 161 feet (49 m) high dam is of concrete buttress construction and impounds the River Haddeo to provide a water storage capacity of some 21,000 megalitres over an area of 374 acres (1.51 km^{2}). Aggregate for the dam came from a quarry at Bampton and sand from Uffculme. These were combined to give a pinkish tinge to blend in with the local geology.

The tributary valleys include the River Pulham, which passes the village of Brompton Regis and continues to Hartford where it joins the Haddeo.

At times of low flow in the River Exe, water is released into the river for abstraction downstream at Tiverton and Exeter. The effects of this regulation of the water flow from the lake have been studied by comparing the regulated River Haddeo and the neighbouring (unregulated) River Pulham. It showed that the main thermal effects of impoundment and regulation have been to raise mean water temperature, eliminate freezing conditions, depress summer maximum values, delay the annual cycle and reduce diurnal fluctuation.

In 2001 - 2002 South West Water commissioned a detailed assessment of fish population, physical habitat, flow and water quality data within the River Haddeo, since it has been subject to regulated releases from Wimbleball Reservoir, to identify potential bottlenecks restricting the development of juvenile salmon populations.

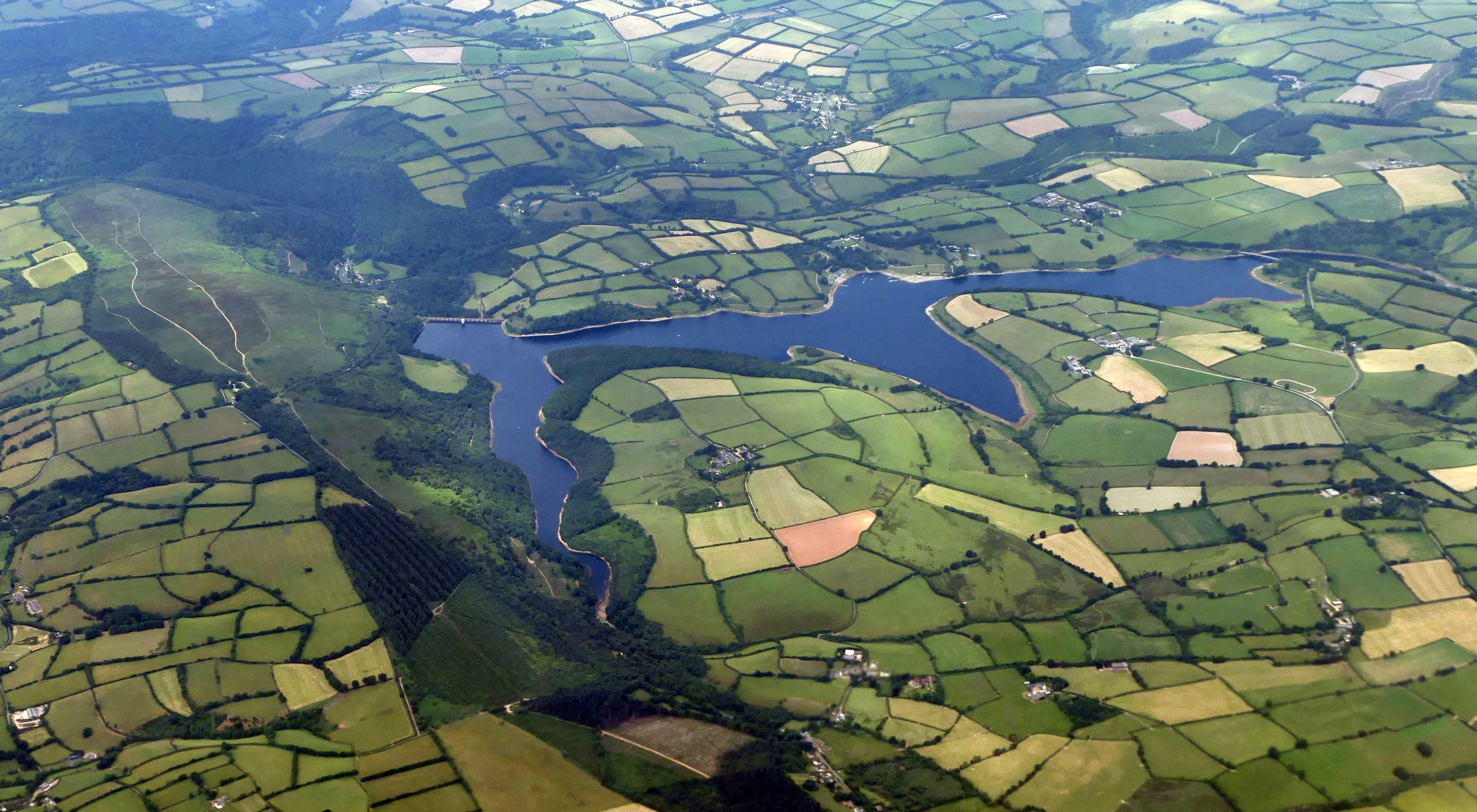
Aerial view of the reservoir and Haddon Hill.

Managed by the charity South West Lakes Trust, the lake offers a popular location for walking, camping, birdwatching, angling, sailing, windsurfing, canoeing, rowing and kayaking. In December 2005 the trust was successful in obtaining funding for a £1 million project to provide a new rowing store, conversion of barn space into showers and changing areas, new sports equipment, an accessible bird hide, and interpretation, improved access, and signage around the site. In 2006 a new £1 million activity centre opened.

Wimbleball Sailing Club Limited is a private company that provides training, cruising and racing for its members. In 1965, it started as a family sailing club.

The southern end of the lake is overlooked by the tower of Old Church of St James, Upton.
