= West Somerset =

Former non-metropolitan district in England

- Non-metropolitan district

- Shown within Somerset
- Sovereign state: United Kingdom
- Constituent country: England
- Region: South West England
- Ceremonial county: Somerset
- Admin HQ: Williton
- Created: 1 April 1974
- Abolished: 1 April 2019

Government
  - Type: Non-metropolitan district
  - Council

Area
  - Total: 280.63 sq mi (726.84 km^{2})

Population (mid-2018)
  - Total: 34,900
  - Density: 130/sq mi (49/km^{2})
- Time zone: UTC0 (GMT)
  - Summer (DST): UTC+1 (BST)
- Post Code: TA - various
- Area code: 01984
- Website: http://www.westsomersetonline.gov.uk/

West Somerset was a local government district in the English county of Somerset from 1974 to 2019. The council covered a largely rural area, with a population of 34,900 in an area of 740 square kilometres (290 sq mi); it was the least populous non-unitary district in England. According to figures released by the Office for National Statistics in 2009, the population of West Somerset had the oldest average age in the United Kingdom at 52. The largest centres of population were the coastal towns of Minehead (population 10,000) and Watchet (4,400).

The council's administrative headquarters were located in the village of Williton, with an additional office in Minehead.

In September 2016, West Somerset and Taunton Deane councils agreed in principle to merge the districts into one (with one council) subject to consultation. The new district would not be a unitary authority: it would still be part of the Somerset County Council area. In March 2018 both councils voted in favour of the merger and it came into effect on 1 April 2019, with the first elections to the new council in May 2019. The new authority was known as Somerset West and Taunton Council.

== History ==
The district was formed on 1 April 1974, under the Local Government Act 1972, by a merger of the previous urban districts of Minehead and Watchet, along with Dulverton Rural District and Williton Rural District.

=== Listed buildings ===
There were 33 Grade I listed buildings in West Somerset: the oldest are Culbone Church (one of the smallest churches in England, and pre-Norman in origin) and Tarr Steps, which some say originates in the Bronze Age, although others date them from around 1400. Dunster has the greatest concentration of Grade I listed buildings including Dunster Castle, the Yarn Market, Gallox Bridge and Priory Church of St George. Other sites include manor houses such as Nettlecombe Court and Orchard Wyndham. The most recent buildings included in the list are Crowcombe Court which was completed in 1739 and the Church of St John the Baptist in Carhampton which was rebuilt in 1863. There are numerous religious structures in Somerset, with the largest number being Anglican parish churches, dating from Norman or medieval eras. Some of the churches are included in the Somerset towers, a collection of distinctive, mostly spireless Gothic church towers.

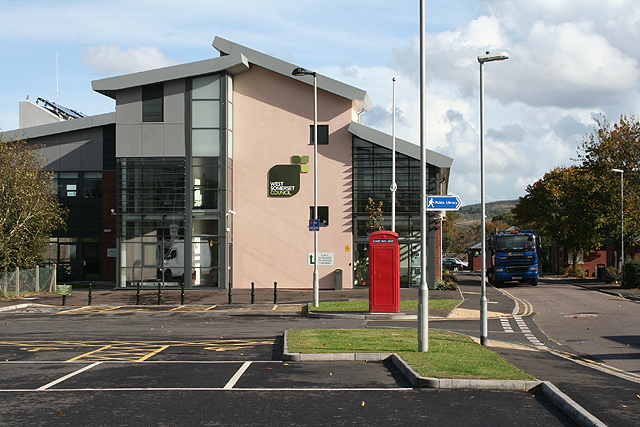
West Somerset Council Offices in Williton

=== Financial difficulties ===
In 2012 financial difficulties at the council, including a £1 million reduction over three years, lead to plans to outsource most of the services provided to the population and make most of the staff redundant. It was proposed that some services may be shared with Taunton Deane council. In December 2012 the grant received from central government was increased by 0.9% meaning the council had £3.8million to spend on the provision of services.

== Geography ==
West Somerset benefits from one of the most scenic landscapes in England. Nearly two-thirds of the western land area of the district forms part of Exmoor National Park, designated in 1954, while on the eastern edge of the district are the Quantock Hills, which in 1956 became the first Area of Outstanding Natural Beauty created in the UK. Large areas of Exmoor and the Quantock Hills are also designated as Sites of Special Scientific Interest because of their value for wildlife.

The West Somerset Railway runs through most of the district, from Bishop's Lydeard in the south east to Minehead in the north west. Operated mainly as a tourist attraction, the railway runs mostly steam and some diesel locomotives.

== Governance ==
West Somerset District Council was elected every four years, with 28 councillors being elected at each election. From the first election to the council in 1973 to the 1995 election the council had a majority of independents. Since then the Conservative Party won a majority at the 2003 election, but independents took a majority back at the 2007 election. Following the election in 2011 the Conservatives regained a majority, which they then held until the council's abolition in 2019.

== Settlements ==
- Allerford, Ashbeer
- Battleton, Bickham, Bicknoller, Bilbrook, Bossington, Brandish Street, Bratton, Bridgetown, Brompton Ralph, Brompton Regis, Brushford
- Carhampton, Chapel Cleeve, Churchtown, Clatworthy, Crowcombe, Crowcombe Heathfield, Culbone, Cutcombe
- Dulverton, Dunster
- East Quantoxhead, Elworthy, Escott, Exford, Exton
- Flaxpool
- Halsway, Hawkridge, Higher Vexford, Holford, Huish Champflower
- Kilve, Kilton, Kingsbridge, Kingswood
- Lawford, Leighland Chapel, Lilstock, Lower Vellow, Lower Vexford, Lower Weacombe, Luccombe, Luxborough, Lynch, Lyncombe
- Minehead, Monksilver
- Oare, Oareford, Old Cleeve
- Pooltown, Porlock, Preston
- Roadwater
- St Audries, Sampford Brett, Selworthy, Simonsbath, Skilgate, Stoke Pero, Stogumber, Stogursey, Stringston
- Timberscombe, Tivington, Torre, Treborough, Triscombe
- Upton
- Vellow
- Washford, Watchet, Weacombe, West Quantoxhead, Williton, Winsford, Withycombe, Withypool, Woodford, Wootton Courtenay
- Yarde

== Parishes ==
Image	Name	Status	Population	Former local authority	Coordinates	Refs
Stone building with arched windows and square tower.	Bicknoller	Civil parish	371	Williton Rural District	51.15°N 3.27°W	
Stone building with square tower, partially obscured by trees. In the foreground are gravestones.	Brompton Ralph	Civil parish	287	Williton Rural District	51.08°N 3.31°W	
Several buildings including a square church tower amongst trees.	Brompton Regis	Civil parish	449	Dulverton Rural District	51.07°N 3.49°W	
Stone building with square tower, partially obscured by trees.	Brushford	Civil parish	519	Dulverton Rural District	51.02°N 3.53°W	
Stone building with square tower. In the foreground are gravestones and trees.	Carhampton	Civil parish	865	Williton Rural District	51.17°N 3.42°W	
Stone building with square tower. In the foreground are stone crosses, gravestones and trees.	Clatworthy	Civil parish	101	Williton Rural District	51.07°N 3.35°W	
Stone building with square tower. In the foreground are stone crosses, gravestones and trees.	Crowcombe	Civil parish	489	Williton Rural District	51.12°N 3.23°W	
Stone building with square tower. In the foreground are gravestones.	Cutcombe	Civil parish	361	Williton Rural District	51.14°N 3.53°W	
Stone building with arched windows and square tower seen at the end of a narrow lane with white painted houses on the right and a wall on the left.	Dulverton	Town	1,408	Dulverton Rural District	51.05°N 3.55°W	
Street scene with houses and shops on the left and an octagonal structure has a central stone pier which supports a heavy timber framework which carries a slate roof with central wooden lantern surmounted by a weather vane. In the distance is a castle.	Dunster	Civil parish	817	Williton Rural District	51.18°N 3.45°W	
Stone building with square tower amongst trees. In the foreground are cows in a field.	East Quantoxhead	Civil parish	104	Williton Rural District	51.18°N 3.24°W	
Stone building with tiled roof and square tower, surrounded by vegetation.	Elworthy	Civil parish	103	Williton Rural District	51.11°N 3.31°W	
Stone building with square tower. Trees are to the right and behind with gravestones in the foreground.	Exford	Civil parish	405	Dulverton Rural District	51.13°N 3.64°W	
Mound of stones with fields in the background.	Exmoor	Civil parish	251	Dulverton Rural District	51.14°N 3.75°W	
Wooden waterwheel on the side of a white painted building, partially obscured by trees.	Exton	Civil parish	243	Dulverton Rural District	51.09°N 3.54°W	
Buildings nestled in rolling hills.	Holford	Civil parish	392	Williton Rural District	51.16°N 3.21°W	
Square stone tower with gravestones in the foreground.	Huish Champflower	Civil parish	301	Dulverton Rural District	51.06°N 3.36°W	
Stone wall with window of ruined building.	Kilve	Civil parish	305	Williton Rural District	51.18°N 3.22°W	
Looking down on the village with houses and stone church building with square tower.	Luccombe	Civil parish	157	Williton Rural District	51.19°N 3.56°W	
Stone bridge over water, surrounded by vegetation.	Luxborough	Civil parish	237	Williton Rural District	51.13°N 3.46°W	
Town seen from a nearby hill with multiple houses. The sea can be seen on the left and the white tent like canopy left of centre is the Butlins centre.	Minehead	Town	11,981	Williton Rural District; Minehead Urban District	51.20°N 3.47°W	
Old stone building with archway.	Minehead Without	Civil parish	60	Williton Rural District	51.20°N 3.51°W	
Stone building with square tower.	Monksilver	Civil parish	113	Williton Rural District	51.13°N 3.33°W	
Reddish stone buildings. The church in the foreground has a square tower.	Nettlecombe	Civil parish	174	Williton Rural District	51.13°N 3.35°W	
Small stone bridge over a stream	Oare	Civil parish	68	Williton Rural District	51.20°N 3.71°W	
Stone building with square tower. In the foreground are gravestones.	Old Cleeve	Civil parish	1,672	Williton Rural District	51.17°N 3.38°W	
Street scene showing stone church with truncated spire, On the right is a white painted building.	Porlock	Civil parish	1,440	Williton Rural District	51.21°N 3.60°W	
Stone building with white painted square tower. In the foreground is a road junction.	Sampford Brett	Civil parish	270	Williton Rural District	51.16°N 3.31°W	
Thatched roofs of white painted houses nestled in tree filled valley.	Selworthy	Civil parish	477	Williton Rural District	51.21°N 3.55°W	
Stone building with square tower. In the foreground are gravestones.	Skilgate	Civil parish	100	Dulverton Rural District	51.04°N 3.45°W	
Wooden signal box next to railway platform decorated with flowers.	Stogumber	Civil parish	702	Williton Rural District	51.13°N 3.29°W	
White painted church with square tower topped with a spire.	Stogursey	Civil parish	1,385	Williton Rural District	51.18°N 3.14°W	
Stone church with red tiled roofs.	Stringston	Civil parish	116	Williton Rural District	51.18°N 3.18°W	
Reddish stone church with square tower.	Timberscombe	Civil parish	402	Williton Rural District	51.13°N 3.54°W	
Stone kilns built into a bank with a road in front.	Treborough	Civil parish	51	Williton Rural District	51.12°N 3.41°W	
Stone building with small bell tower. In the foreground are gravestones.	Upton	Civil parish	250	Dulverton Rural District	51.10°N 3.44°W	
View of multiple houses with sea on the left and hills in the background.	Watchet	Town	3,785	Watchet Urban District	51.18°N 3.33°W	
Waterfall cascading down rockface.	West Quantoxhead	Civil parish	343	Williton Rural District	51.17°N 3.27°W	
Stone building with arched doorway and windows. Two small towers.	Williton	Civil parish	2,607	Williton Rural District	51.16°N 3.31°W	
Stone building with square tower. In the foreground are gravestones.	Winsford	Civil parish	321	Dulverton Rural District	51.10°N 3.57°W	
White painted church with square tower.	Withycombe	Civil parish	293	Williton Rural District	51.16°N 3.41°W	
Stone bridge with six arches over water.	Withypool and Hawkridge	Civil parish	201	Dulverton Rural District	51.11°N 3.65°W	
Stone building with square tower. In the foreground are gravestones.	Wootton Courtenay	Civil parish	264	Williton Rural District	51.18°N 3.52°W	

== Education ==
County schools (those which are not independent) in the five non-metropolitan districts of the county were operated by Somerset County Council.

For a full list of schools see: List of schools in Somerset

== See also ==
- Grade I listed buildings in West Somerset
- Quay West Radio
