= 2007 West Somerset District Council election =

2007 UK local government election

Map of the results of the 2007 West Somerset District Council election. independents in grey, Conservatives in blue, Labour in red and Liberal Democrats in yellow.

The 2007 West Somerset District Council election took place on 3 May 2007 to elect members of West Somerset District Council in Somerset, England. The whole council was up for election and independents gained overall control of the council from the Conservative Party.

== Election result ==
The Conservatives dropped to 13 seats, a net loss of 4, and fell behind the independents who became the largest group with 16 councillors. Conservative losses included defeats in the seats of Alcombe East, Old Cleeve, Porlock, Quantock Vale and West Quantock, but they did make some gains, including in Watchet where an independent lost a seat. Both the Labour Party and the Liberal Democrats lost a seat, to only have one councillor each. Overall turnout at the election was 46.9%.

Following the election independent councillor Keith Ross became the new leader of the council, taking over from the Conservatives, with Labour councillor Simon Stokes becoming deputy leader.

West Somerset local election result 2007
Party	Seats	Gains	Losses	Net gain/loss	Seats %	Votes %	Votes	+/−
Independent	16	9	3	+6	51.6	48.0	10,292	+18.8
Conservative	13	4	8	-4	41.9	43.0	9,218	+0.9
Labour	1	0	1	-1	3.2	5.4	1,150	-11.3
Liberal Democrats	1	0	1	-1	3.2	3.6	776	-7.1

== Ward results ==
Alcombe East (2)
Party	Candidate	Votes	%	±%
Independent	Ian Melhuish	323		
Conservative	Nicolas Messarra	201		
Conservative	Jamie Anderson	157		
Turnout		681	43.7	+22.8
Independent gain from Conservative		Swing		
Conservative hold		Swing		

Alcombe West (2)
Party	Candidate	Votes	%	±%
Labour	Simon Stokes	479		
Conservative	Norman Hercock	355		
Labour	Marcus Kravis	348		
Turnout		1,182	39.2	+4.4
Labour hold		Swing		
Conservative gain from Labour		Swing		

Aville Vale
Party	Candidate	Votes	%	±%
Conservative	Roger Webber	313	55.4	−23.1
Independent	Aron Cody-Boutcher	252	44.6	+23.2
Majority		61	10.8	−46.5
Turnout		565	56.2	+7.0
Conservative hold		Swing		

Brompton Ralph and Haddon
Party	Candidate	Votes	%	±%
Conservative	Keith Turner	255	63.1	+23.3
Independent	David Gliddon	149	36.9	−23.3
Majority		106	26.2	
Turnout		404	54.3	+9.4
Conservative gain from Independent		Swing		

Carhampton and Withycombe
Party	Candidate	Votes	%	±%
Liberal Democrats	Peter Humber	417	71.8	
Conservative	Brian Jenkinson	164	28.2	
Majority		253	43.6	
Turnout		581	56.4	
Liberal Democrats hold		Swing		

Crowcombe and Stogumber
Party	Candidate	Votes	%	±%
Conservative	Tim Taylor	315	58.0	
Independent	Roy Harbour	228	42.0	
Majority		87	16.0	
Turnout		543	58.3	
Conservative hold		Swing		

Dulverton and Brushford (2)
Party	Candidate	Votes	%	±%
Independent	Keith Ross	684		
Independent	Michael Gammon	451		
Conservative	Paul Chamberlain	341		
Turnout		1,476	53.3	+0.8
Independent hold		Swing		
Independent hold		Swing		

Dunster
Party	Candidate	Votes	%	±%
Conservative	Bryan Leaker	186	59.8	−0.4
Independent	Julie Harvey-Smith	125	40.2	+19.3
Majority		61	19.6	−19.6
Turnout		311	47.9	−2.5
Conservative hold		Swing		

Exmoor
Party	Candidate	Votes	%	±%
Conservative	Steven Pugsley	unopposed		
Conservative hold		Swing		

Minehead North (3)
Party	Candidate	Votes	%	±%
Independent	Doug Ross	822		
Conservative	Christine Lawrence	580		
Conservative	David Sanders	453		
Conservative	Jeremy White	415		
Turnout		2,270	41.4	+3.9
Independent gain from Conservative		Swing		
Conservative hold		Swing		
Conservative hold		Swing		

Minehead South (3)
Party	Candidate	Votes	%	±%
Independent	Terry Venner	822		
Independent	Michael Downes	706		
Independent	John Walker	631		
Conservative	Anthony Berry	571		
Conservative	Dudley Seale	442		
Conservative	Stan Taylor	331		
Turnout		3,503	43.4	+2.2
Independent gain from Liberal Democrats		Swing		
Independent hold		Swing		
Independent gain from Conservative		Swing		

Old Cleeve (2)
Party	Candidate	Votes	%	±%
Independent	Kate Kravis	532		
Independent	Neil Parbrook	479		
Conservative	Pamela Driver	302		
Turnout		1,313	42.7	
Independent gain from Conservative		Swing		
Independent hold		Swing		

Porlock and District (2)
Party	Candidate	Votes	%	±%
Conservative	Angela Palmer	656		
Independent	Jon Freeman	427		
Conservative	Mike Padgett	273		
Turnout		1,356	47.7	
Conservative hold		Swing		
Independent gain from Conservative		Swing		

Quantock Vale (2)
Party	Candidate	Votes	%	±%
Independent	Chris Morgan	424		
Independent	Paul Tipney	420		
Conservative	Mary Crowley	335		
Conservative	Loretta Whetlor	243		
Turnout		1,422	46.6	+4.8
Independent gain from Conservative		Swing		
Independent gain from Conservative		Swing		

Quarme
Party	Candidate	Votes	%	±%
Conservative	Christopher White	347	71.0	
Independent	John Bray	142	29.0	
Majority		205	42.0	
Turnout		489	59.3	
Conservative gain from Independent		Swing		

Watchet (3)
Party	Candidate	Votes	%	±%
Conservative	David Westcott	716		
Conservative	Anthony Knight	505		
Independent	Jennifer Hill	441		
Independent	David Banks	425		
Liberal Democrats	Anthony Bowden	359		
Labour	Peter Murphy	323		
Conservative	Ann Snelling	300		
Turnout		3,069	42.3	+0.7
Conservative gain from Independent		Swing		
Conservative hold		Swing		
Independent hold		Swing		

West Quantock
Party	Candidate	Votes	%	±%
Independent	Mitch Wicking	301	58.2	+14.4
Conservative	Barbara Child	216	41.8	−14.4
Majority		85	16.4	
Turnout		51.7	54.6	+1.6
Independent gain from Conservative		Swing		

Williton (2)
Party	Candidate	Votes	%	±%
Independent	Hugh Davies	696		
Independent	Edwin May	298		
Independent	Ian Aldridge	269		
Conservative	Rose Woods	246		
Independent	John Holden	214		
Independent	William Gulliford	31		
Turnout		1,754	47.7	+1.8
Independent hold		Swing		
Independent hold		Swing		

== By-elections between 2007 and 2011 ==
=== Alcombe East ===
Alcombe East By-Election 1 May 2008
Party	Candidate	Votes	%	±%
Conservative	Dudley Seale	263	59.4	+21.0
Independent	Sandra Slade	103	23.3	−38.3
Labour	Ronald Bridle	42	9.5	+9.5
Liberal Democrats	Anthony Bowden	35	7.9	+7.9
Majority		160	36.1	
Turnout		443	41.1	−2.6
Conservative hold		Swing		

=== Minehead South ===
Minehead South By-Election 16 April 2009
Party	Candidate	Votes	%	±%
Independent	Sandra Slade	393	51.5	−7.5
Conservative	Leslie Smith	370	48.5	+7.5
Majority		23	3.0	
Turnout		763		
Independent hold		Swing		
