= Tiverton and Minehead =

UK Parliament constituency (since 2024)

- County constituency for the House of Commons
- Interactive map of boundaries since 2024
- Boundary of Tiverton and Minehead in South West England
- County: Somerset (majority); Devon (minority)
- Electorate: 70,829 (2023)

Current constituency
- Created: 2024
- Member of Parliament: Rachel Gilmour (Liberal Democrats)
- Seats: One
- Created from: Bridgwater and West Somerset, Taunton Deane & Tiverton and Honiton

Tiverton and Minehead is a constituency of the House of Commons in the UK Parliament. Further to the completion of the 2023 Periodic Review of Westminster constituencies, it was first contested at the 2024 general election. Its first MP is Liberal Democrat Rachel Gilmour, who defeated Ian Liddell-Grainger, the Conservative MP for Bridgwater then Bridgwater and West Somerset from 2001 to 2024.

The constituency is named after the Devon town of Tiverton and the Somerset town of Minehead.

== Constituency profile ==
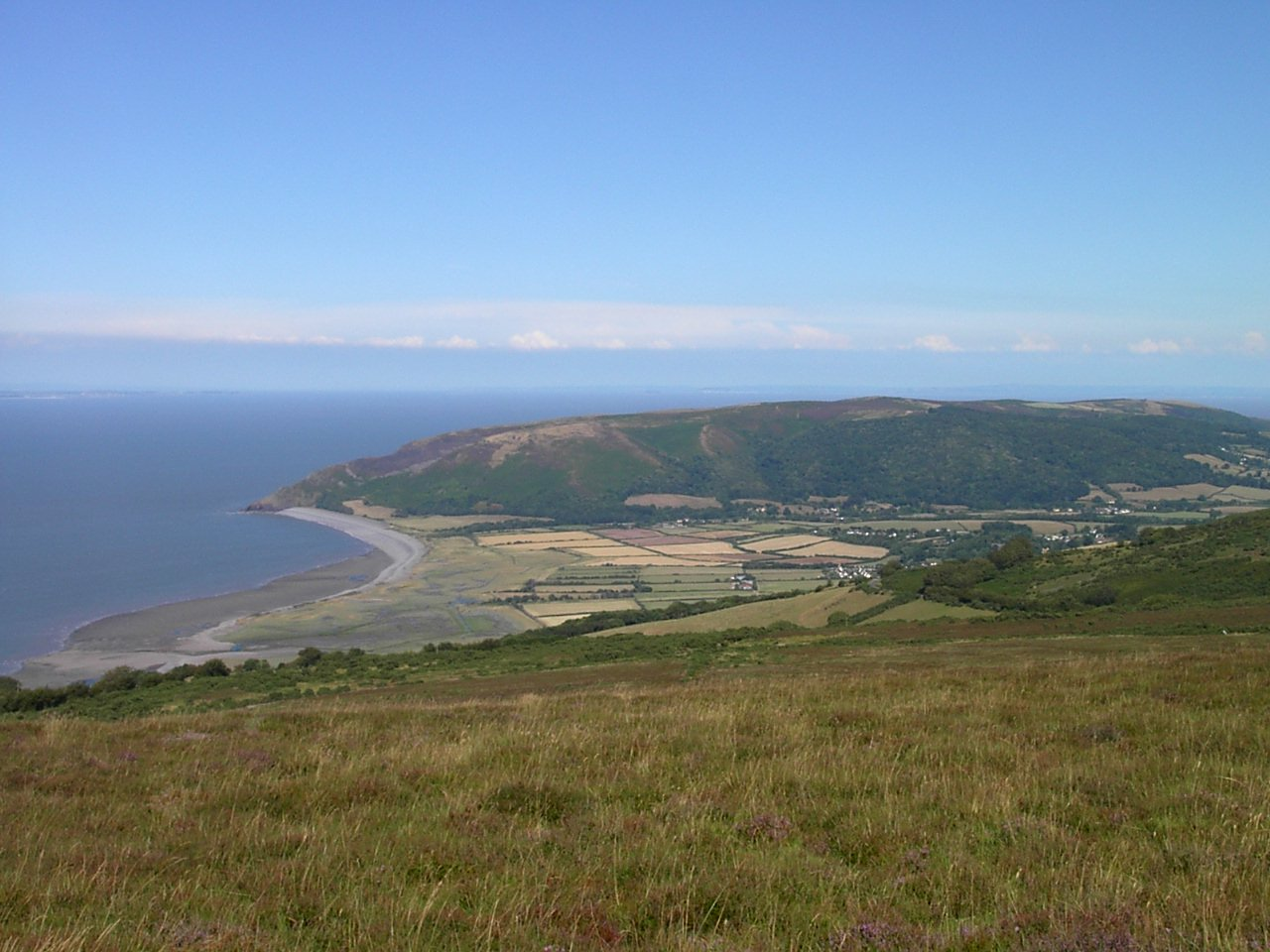
A view over the village of Porlock, near Minehead

Tiverton and Minehead is a constituency in South West England, covering parts of Devon and Somerset. Its largest town is Tiverton, which has a population of around 20,000. Other settlements include the towns of Minehead, Bampton, Dulverton, Wiveliscombe and Watchet and the village of Willand.

This is a large, rural constituency with many small towns and villages. Much of the constituency's area is taken up by Exmoor, a national park of upland moors. Tiverton is a historic market town that grew from traditional rural industries like the wool trade. Minehead and Watchet are coastal towns with a history of maritime trade. This seaside area contains many holiday parks and is popular with tourists. This constituency has average levels of wealth overall; there is some deprivation in Tiverton and the coastal towns whilst the rural villages are more affluent. House prices are generally similar to the regional and UK averages.

Tiverton and Minehead has low proportions of young and middle-aged adults and a large retired population; in 2024, 30% of residents were aged 65 or over. Residents have average levels of income, homeownership, child poverty and education. A high proportion work in the agriculture, tourism and construction sectors, and the percentage claiming unemployment benefits is low. White people made up 98% of the population at the 2021 census.

At the local council level, Tiverton and its surroundings are mostly represented by Liberal Democrats, whilst the coastal areas primarily elected Conservatives. An estimated 57% of voters in Tiverton and Minehead supported leaving the European Union in the 2016 referendum, higher than the UK-wide figure of 52%.

== Boundaries ==
The constituency, which crosses the boundary between the counties of Devon and Somerset, is defined as composing the following as they existed on 1 December 2020:

- The District of Mid Devon wards of: Canonsleigh; Castle; Clare and Shuttern; Cranmore; Halberton; Lower Culm; Lowman; Upper Culm; Westexe.
- The District of Somerset West and Taunton wards of: Alcombe; Cotford St. Luke & Oake; Dulverton & District; Exmoor; Milverton & District; Minehead Central; Minehead North; Old Cleeve & District; Periton & Woodcombe; Porlock & District; Quantock Vale; South Quantock; Watchet & Williton; Wiveliscombe & District.

With effect from 1 April 2023, the District of Somerset West and Taunton was abolished and absorbed into the new unitary authority of Somerset. In addition, a local government boundary review was carried out in Mid Devon which came into effect in May 2023. The constituency therefore now comprises the following from the 2024 general election:

- The District of Mid Devon wards of: Canonsleigh; Clare and Shuttern; Halberton (nearly all); Lower Culm (majority); Tiverton Castle; Tiverton Cranmore; Tiverton Lowman; Tiverton Westexe; Upper Culm.
- The Somerset electoral divisions of: Dulverton and Exmoor; Dunster; Lydeard (majority); Minehead; Upper Tone (most); Watchet and Stogursey.

The seat covers the following areas:

- The town of Tiverton and surrounding rural areas, previously comprising northern parts of the abolished constituency of Tiverton and Honiton (succeeded by Honiton and Sidmouth)
- The area covered by the former District of West Somerset, including the towns of Minehead and Watchet, previously part of the constituency of Bridgwater and West Somerset (renamed Bridgwater)
- Rural areas to the west of Taunton, centred around the small town of Wiveliscombe, transferred from Taunton Deane (renamed Taunton and Wellington)

== Members of Parliament ==
Election	Member	Party
2024	Rachel Gilmour	Liberal Democrat

== Elections ==
=== Elections in the 2020s ===
General election 2024: Tiverton and Minehead
Party	Candidate	Votes	%	±%
Liberal Democrats	Rachel Gilmour	18,326	38.6	+19.1
Conservative	Ian Liddell-Grainger	14,819	31.2	–30.1
Reform	Frederick Keen	7,787	16.4	N/A
Labour	Jonathan Barter	4,325	9.1	–5.2
Green	Laura Buchanan	2,234	4.7	+0.4
Majority		3,507	7.4	N/A
Turnout		47,491	66.1	–3.7
Registered electors		71,843		
Liberal Democrats gain from Conservative		Swing	▲24.6	

2019 notional result
Party	Vote	%
Conservative	30,297	61.3
Liberal Democrats	9,632	19.5
Labour	7,070	14.3
Green	2,103	4.3
Independent	309	0.6
Turnout	49,411	69.8
Electorate	70,829	
