= Somerset West and Taunton =

Former non-metropolitan district in England

- Non-metropolitan district
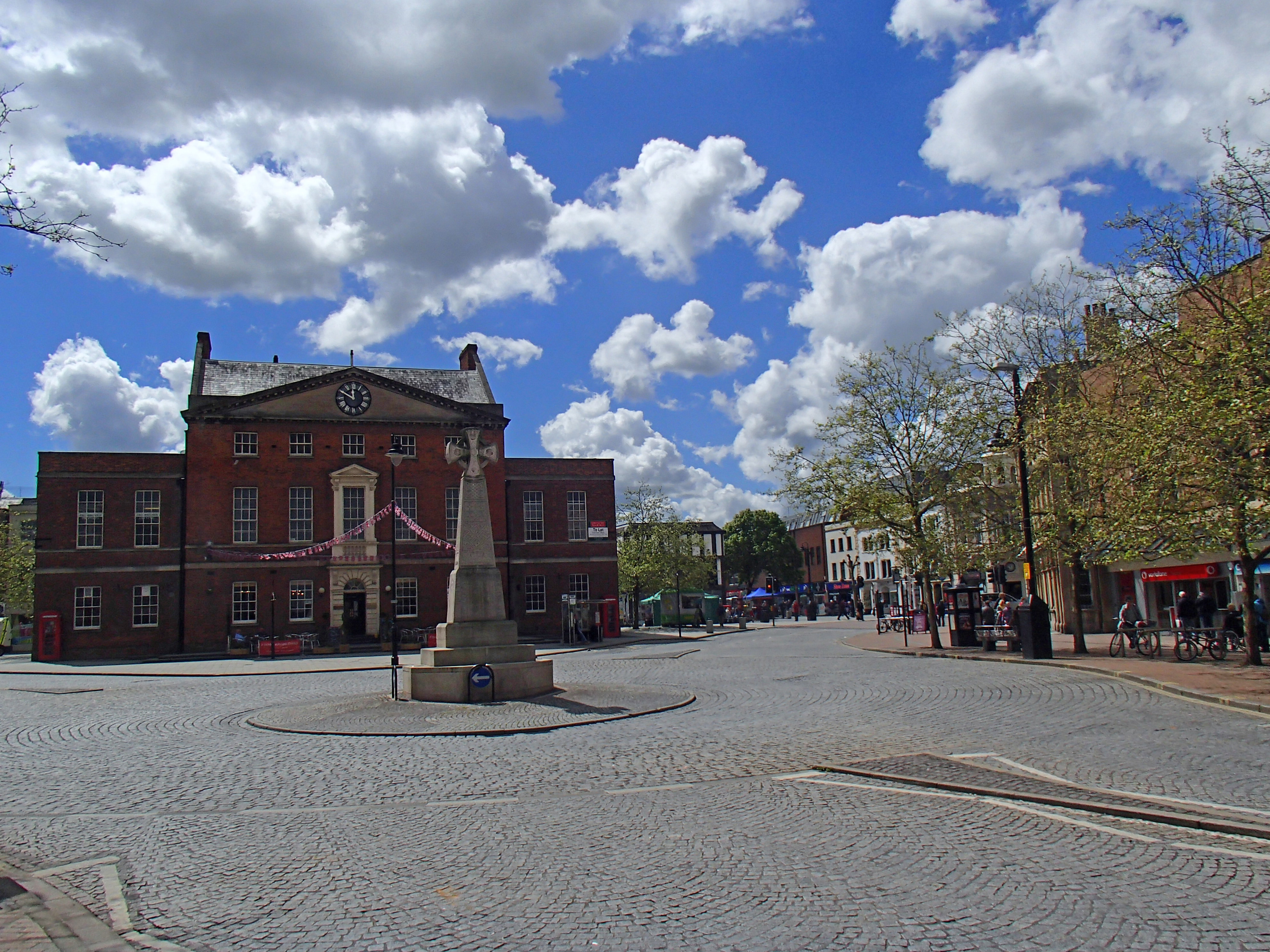

- Council logo

- Somerset West and Taunton district within the county of Somerset
- Sovereign state: United Kingdom
- Constituent country: England
- Region: South West England
- Ceremonial county: Somerset
- Established; Abolished: 1 April 2019; 1 April 2023
- Seat: Taunton

Government
  - Type: Somerset West and Taunton Council

Area
  - Total: 459 sq mi (1,188 km^{2})

Population
  - Total: 157,909
  - Density: 344.3/sq mi (132.9/km^{2})
- Time zone: UTC0 (GMT)
  - Summer (DST): UTC+1 (BST)
- Website: www.somersetwestandtaunton.gov.uk

Somerset West and Taunton was a local government district in Somerset, England, from 2019 to 2023. It was established on 1 April 2019 by the Somerset West and Taunton (Local Government Changes) Order 2018. The council replaced the Taunton Deane and West Somerset councils, which governed the same area from 1974.

On 1 April 2023, the district was abolished and replaced by Somerset unitary district for the area previously served by Somerset County Council.

== Background ==
In September 2016, West Somerset and Taunton Deane councils agreed in principle to merge the districts into a single one, subject to consultation. The new district was not a unitary authority, with Somerset County Council still performing its functions at county level. In March 2018 both councils voted in favour of the merger and it came into effect on 1 April 2019, with the first elections to the new council in May 2019.

The new council was approved by James Brokenshire the Secretary of State for Housing, Communities and Local Government on 30 May 2018. The merger was expected to save £3.1 million each year.

West Somerset covered a largely rural area, with a population of 35,300 in an area of 740 square kilometres (290 sq mi); it was the least populous non-unitary district in England. According to figures released by the Office for National Statistics in 2009, the population of West Somerset has the oldest average age in the United Kingdom at 52. The largest centres of population were the coastal towns of Minehead (population 10,000) and Watchet (4,400).

Taunton Deane was based in Taunton. Taunton Deane had an estimated population of 102,600 in 2001.

== Governance ==
Somerset West and Taunton Council

Type
- Type: Non-metropolitan district council

History
- Founded: 1 April 2019
- Disbanded: 31 March 2023

Elections
- Last election: 2 May 2019

Meeting place
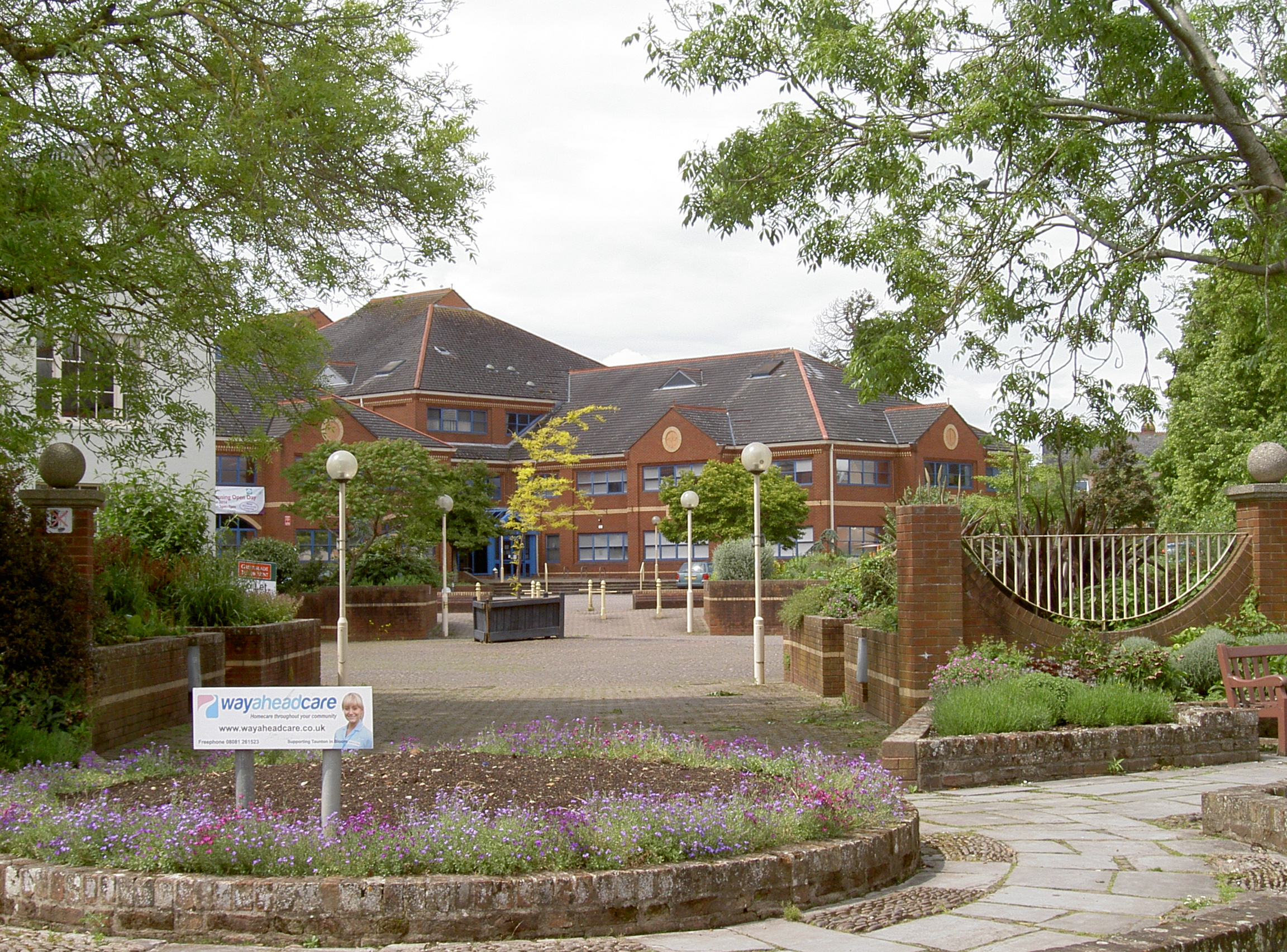
- Deane House, Belvedere Road, Taunton

A shadow authority was created in 2018 to oversee the transition to the new council, comprising all the councillors from the two outgoing councils. The Conservatives held a majority of the seats on the shadow authority, which was led by John Williams, the last leader of Taunton Deane Borough Council. The first elections to the new council were held on 2 May 2019, which saw the Liberal Democrats win a majority of the seats. John Williams was unsuccessful in securing a seat on the new council.

Liberal Democrat councillor Federica Smith-Roberts was subsequently appointed as the leader of the council on 22 May 2019. She remained the leader until the council's abolition in 2023.

=== Premises ===
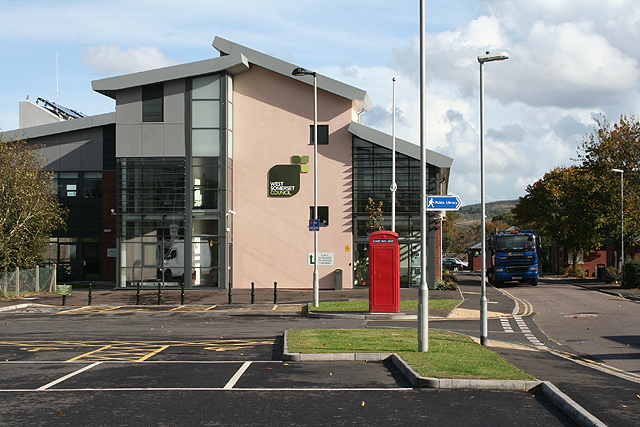
West Somerset House in Williton

Full council meetings were held at Deane House on Belvedere Road in Taunton, which had previously been the headquarters of Taunton Deane Borough Council. The council's administrative offices were split between Deane House and the former West Somerset District Council headquarters at West Somerset House in Williton.

== Abolition ==
On 1 April 2023, the council was abolished and its functions passed to Somerset County Council, which was renamed Somerset Council on the same day, becoming a unitary authority. Elections for the new council took place in May 2022, and it ran alongside the other councils until their abolition in April 2023.

== See also ==
- 2019–2023 structural changes to local government in England
