= Torre (WSMR) railway station =

Former railway stopping place in Somerset, England

Torre (WSMR)

General information
- Location: Torre, Somerset; England
- Coordinates: 51.1524°N 3.3657°W
- Grid reference: ST045401
- Platforms: 0

Other information
- Status: Disused

History
- Original company: West Somerset Mineral Railway

Key dates
- 4 September 1865: Opened for passengers
- 7 November 1898: Closed
Location

Torre was a recognised stopping place, not a formal station, on the West Somerset Mineral Railway (WSMR). The railway's prime purpose was to carry iron ore from mines to Watchet harbour in Somerset, England. It was "general practice to pick up or set down passengers .. at Torre."

The line was unconnected to any other, though it passed under what is now the West Somerset Railway south of the village of Watchet.

The stopping place was next to a level crossing.

== Services ==
The line opened for goods traffic in 1857. A passenger service began in September 1865, connecting Watchet with the village of Washford and the hamlets of Roadwater and Comberow. Passengers were carried from Comberow up a rope-hauled incline to Brendon Hill and on to Gupworthy on a wagon, free of charge, but at their own risk.

The initial passenger service consisted of four trains a day out and back.

Like other railways built to serve one industry, such as iron ore carrying lines in Cumbria, the WSMR's fortunes were at the mercy of that industry. Iron and steel making was given to boom and bust and suffered a significant downturn in the 1870s, exacerbated by imports of cheaper and better ore from abroad. The iron mines which provided the WSMR's staple traffic stuttered to complete closure between 1879 and 1883. The line did not close immediately, two mixed trains a day continued to run until 1898, when all traffic ceased.

In 1907 the Somerset Mineral Syndicate made an attempt to revive the line, reopening Colton mine and starting a new bore at Timwood. Apart from a reopening day special on 4 July 1907 no passenger service was provided. The venture collapsed in March 1910.

After closure in 1910 the line through Torre was subject to minimal maintenance.

The line's tracks were lifted in 1917 as a contribution to the war effort.

== Abandonment ==
With neither track, rolling stock nor prospects an Act of Parliament was sought and passed to abandon the railway. Its assets were auctioned on 8 August 1924 and the company was wound up in 1925.

Evocative contemporary descriptions of the line in its later years have been preserved.

== Afterlife ==
By 2016 much of the route could still be traced on the ground, on maps and on satellite images. The incline from Comberow to Brendon Hill is a Listed structure.

Preceding station	Disused railways	Following station
Washford; Line and station closed	West Somerset Mineral Railway	Clitsome; Line and station closed
