= Comberow railway station =

Former railway station in England

Comberow

General information
- Location: Comberow, Somerset; England
- Coordinates: 51.1087°N 3.3879°W
- Grid reference: ST029352
- Platforms: 1

Other information
- Status: Disused

History
- Original company: West Somerset Mineral Railway

Key dates
- December 1857: Opened for goods
- 4 September 1865: Opened for passengers
- 7 November 1898: Closed
- 1907: Reopened
- 1910: Closed
Location

Comberow was an intermediate station on the West Somerset Mineral Railway (WSMR), which was built primarily to carry iron ore from mines to Watchet harbour in Somerset, England. The line was unconnected to any other, though it passed under what is now the West Somerset Railway south of the town of Watchet. The station was located at the foot of the line's most striking feature - a three quarters of a mile, rope-hauled incline at a gradient of 1 in 4 (25%).

The line's seven stations were designed by Rice Hopkins. Comberow was one of the five which showed a clear family resemblance. It offered the usual goods and passenger facilities. Although the station nameboard and all published literature refers to the station as "Comberow", passenger tickets were printed "Combe Row".

Comberow's situation in a valley at the foot of the incline, together with the happy accidents of having an early railway photographer in the vicinity and exceptional historians interested in the railway has left a rich legacy of photographs of the station in context.

== Services ==
The stone-built station opened for goods traffic in 1857. A passenger service began in September 1865, connecting Watchet with the village of Washford and the hamlets of Roadwater and Comberow. Passengers were carried from Comberow up the rope-hauled incline to Brendon Hill and on to Gupworthy on a wagon, free of charge, but at their own risk.

The initial passenger service consisted of four trains a day out and back.

Like other railways built to serve one industry, such as iron ore carrying lines in Cumbria, their fortunes were at the mercy of that industry. Iron and steel making was given to boom and bust and suffered a significant downturn in the 1870s, exacerbated by imports of cheaper and better ore from abroad. The iron mines which provided the WSMR's staple traffic stuttered to complete closure between 1879 and 1883. The line did not close immediately, two mixed trains a day continued to run until 1898, when all traffic ceased.

In 1907 the Somerset Mineral Syndicate made an attempt to revive the line, reopening Colton mine and starting a new bore at Timwood, a few hundred yards north of Comberow. Apart from a reopening day special on 4 July 1907 no passenger service was provided. The venture collapsed in March 1910.

== Abandonment ==
After closure in 1910 the line through Comberow was subject to minimal maintenance until its metals were requisitioned for the war effort in 1917.

With neither track, rolling stock nor prospects an Act of Parliament was sought and passed to abandon the railway. Its assets were auctioned on 8 August 1924 and the company was wound up in 1925, after which the station building slowly decayed.

Evocative contemporary descriptions of the line in its later years have been preserved.

== Afterlife ==
By 2016 much of the route could still be traced on the ground, on maps and on satellite images. The incline from Comberow to Brendon Hill is a Listed structure. The stationmaster's house survives, but has been greatly altered.

Preceding station	Disused railways	Following station
Roadwater; Line and station closed	West Somerset Mineral Railway	Brendon Hill; Line and station closed
