= Washford (WSMR) railway station =

Former railway station in Somerset, England

Washford (WSMR)

General information
- Location: Washford, Somerset; England
- Coordinates: 51.1617°N 3.3616°W
- Grid reference: ST048411
- Platforms: 1

Other information
- Status: Disused

History
- Original company: West Somerset Mineral Railway

Key dates
- April 1857: Opened for goods
- 4 September 1865: Opened for passengers
- 7 November 1898: Closed
- 1907: Reopened
- 1910: Closed
Location

Washford was an intermediate station on the West Somerset Mineral Railway (WSMR), which was built primarily to carry iron ore from mines to Watchet harbour in Somerset, England. The line was unconnected to any other, though it passed under what is now the West Somerset Railway south of the village of Watchet.

The line's seven stations were designed by Rice Hopkins. Washford was one of the five which showed a clear family resemblance. It offered the usual goods and passenger facilities.

== Services ==
The stone-built station opened for goods traffic in 1857. A passenger service began in September 1865, connecting Watchet with the village of Washford and the hamlets of Roadwater and Comberow. Passengers were carried from Comberow up a rope-hauled incline to Brendon Hill and on to Gupworthy on a wagon, free of charge, but at their own risk.

The initial passenger service consisted of four trains a day out and back.

Like other railways built to serve one industry, such as iron ore carrying lines in Cumbria, the WSMR's fortunes were at the mercy of that industry. Iron and steel making was given to boom and bust and suffered a significant downturn in the 1870s, exacerbated by imports of cheaper and better ore from abroad. The iron mines which provided the WSMR's staple traffic stuttered to complete closure between 1879 and 1883. The line did not close immediately, two mixed trains a day continued to run until 1898, when all traffic ceased.

In 1907 the Somerset Mineral Syndicate made an attempt to revive the line, reopening Colton mine and starting a new bore at Timwood. Apart from a reopening day special on 4 July 1907 no passenger service was provided. The ore which was extracted in this period was ill-suited to the furnaces and was almost unsaleable, so the Syndicate built a plant at Washford station to extract relevant impurities and waste and form the resulting material into briquettes which it hoped would be cheaper to transport and more attractive to customers.

The venture collapsed in March 1910, with the briquette kiln going for a mere £5.

In 1911 A.R. Angus, an Australian inventor, leased the Watchet-Washford section of the line to test and demonstrate an automatic signal warning device. He put the stretch into good order and installed a telephone line between the two stations. The demonstration of the system took place at Kentsford on 5 July 1912, which turned into something of a gala for local people, watching two hired GWR tender locos, the only tender locos to work this line, being brought safely to a halt rather than the anticipated head-on collision. Testing of this system continued intermittently until the outbreak of war.

The line was requisitioned for the war effort in 1917, but even that was not the end. In September 1918 the Timber Supply Department of the Board of Trade applied for and were granted permission to lay a light railway on the lower trackbed and to use either Washford or Roadwater station buildings. The line was used to carry timber to Watchet from a government sawmill at Washford, using mules as motive power. The track was removed in early 1920. Recorded simply as "narrow", research continues as to its gauge.

== Abandonment ==
With neither track, rolling stock nor prospects an Act of Parliament was sought and passed to abandon the railway. Its assets were auctioned on 8 August 1924 and the company was wound up in 1925. Washford station building was demolished in the 1930s and the stone reused to build a larger building on the same site.

Evocative contemporary descriptions of the line in its later years have been preserved.

== Afterlife ==
By 2016 much of the route could still be traced on the ground, on maps and on satellite images. The incline from Comberow to Brendon Hill is a Listed structure.

Preceding station	Disused railways	Following station
Watchet; Line and station closed	West Somerset Mineral Railway	Torre; Line and station closed
