= Roadwater railway station =

Former railway station in Somerset, England

Roadwater

General information
- Location: Roadwater, Somerset; England
- Coordinates: 51.1351°N 3.3845°W
- Grid reference: ST032382
- Platforms: 1

Other information
- Status: Disused

History
- Original company: West Somerset Mineral Railway

Key dates
- April 1857: Opened for goods
- 4 September 1865: Opened for passengers
- 7 November 1898: Closed
- 1907: Reopened
- 1910: Closed
Location

The Roadwater railway station was an intermediate station on the West Somerset Mineral Railway (WSMR), which was constructed primarily to transport iron ore from mines to Watchet harbour in Somerset, England. The line was isolated from other rail networks, though it passed beneath what is now the West Somerset Railway north of Roadwater.

The line's seven stations were designed by Rice Hopkins. Roadwater was one of five stations that shared a distinctive architectural style. It provided typical goods services, as well as coal and passenger facilities. A Temperance Hall was also constructed nearby.

== Services ==
The stone-built station opened for goods traffic in 1857. A passenger service began in September 1865, connecting Watchet with the village of Washford and the hamlets of Roadwater and Comberow. Passengers were transported from Comberow up a rope-hauled incline to Brendon Hill and onward to Gupworthy on a wagon, free of charge, but at their own risk.

The initial passenger service operated with four trains daily in each direction.

Like other railways built to support a single industry, such as iron ore lines in Cumbria, the WSMR’s fortunes were tied to the iron industry. Iron and steel production was highly susceptible to economic cycles and faced a severe downturn in the 1870s, worsened by imports of cheaper, higher-quality ore from abroad. The iron mines that provided the WSMR's primary traffic gradually ceased operations between 1879 and 1883. Although the line did not close immediately, only two mixed trains continued to run daily until 1898, when all traffic ceased.

In 1907, the Somerset Mineral Syndicate attempted to revive the line by reopening Colton mine and starting a new bore at Timwood. Apart from a special reopening service on 4 July 1907, no passenger service was offered. This venture ultimately collapsed in March 1910.

== Abandonment ==
After its closure in 1910, the line through Roadwater received minimal maintenance, until its tracks were requisitioned for the war effort in 1917.

With no track, rolling stock, or future prospects, an Act of Parliament was sought and passed to formally abandon the railway. Its assets were auctioned on 8 August 1924, and the company was officially wound up in 1925.

Evocative contemporary descriptions of the line during its later years have been preserved.

== Afterlife ==
By 2016, much of the route could still be traced on the ground, in maps, and on satellite images. The incline from Comberow to Brendon Hill is a listed structure. Roadwater station has been extended into a bungalow but remains unmistakably recognizable as a former railway station.

Preceding station	Disused railways	Following station
Clitsome; Line and station closed	West Somerset Mineral Railway	Comberow; Line and station closed
