= Watchet (WSMR) railway station =

Former railway station in England

Watchet (WSMR)
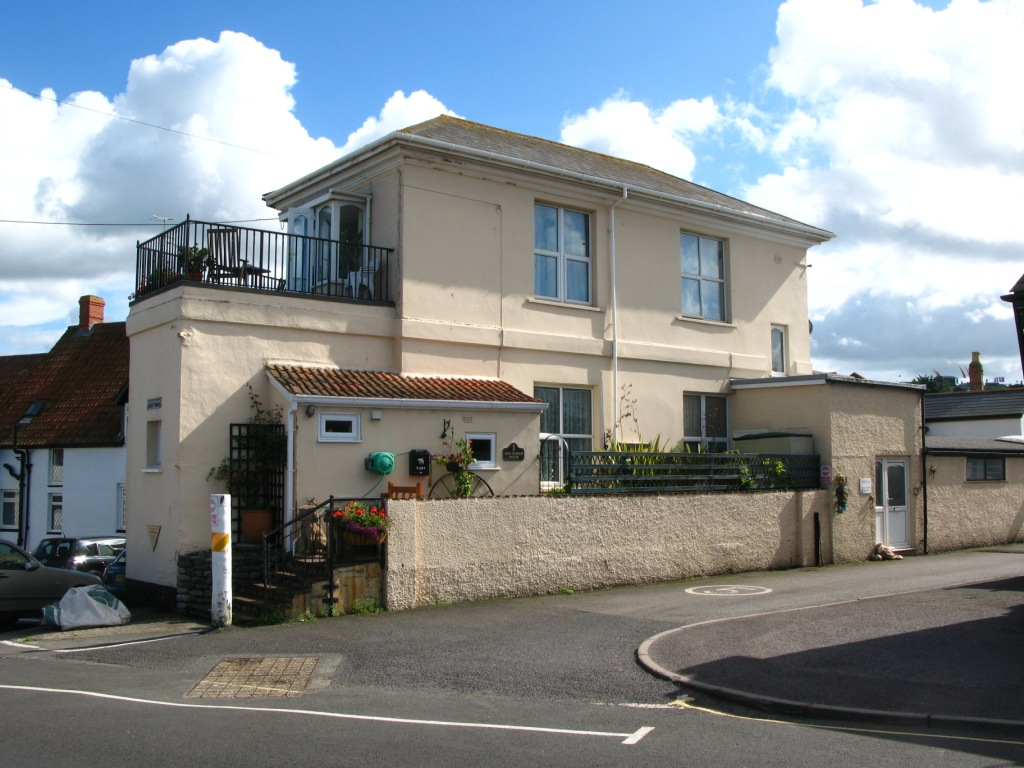
- Watchet (WSMR) railway station

General information
- Location: Watchet, Somerset; England
- Coordinates: 51.1826°N 3.3319°W
- Grid reference: ST070434
- Platforms: 1

Other information
- Status: Disused

History
- Original company: West Somerset Mineral Railway

Key dates
- April 1857: Opened for goods
- 4 September 1865: Opened for passengers
- 7 November 1898: Closed
- 1907: Reopened for goods
- 1910: Closed
Location

Watchet was the northern passenger terminus of the West Somerset Mineral Railway (WSMR), which was built primarily to carry iron ore from mines to Watchet harbour in Somerset, England. The line was unconnected to any other, though it passed under what is now the West Somerset Railway south of the village of Watchet.

As well as the usual goods and passenger facilities the station housed the company offices. A single track engine shed stood at Whitehall, a short distance to the south.

All station buildings on the line except Gupworthy and Watchet were built to a common design. Watchet station was larger and laid out differently, with no obvious "family resemblance" to the others.

== Services ==
The stone-built station opened for goods traffic in 1857. A passenger service began in September 1865, connecting Watchet with the village of Washford and the hamlets of Roadwater and Comberow. Passengers were carried up a rope-hauled incline to Brendon Hill and on to Gupworthy on a wagon, free of charge, but at their own risk.

The initial passenger service consisted of four trains a day out and back.

Like other railways built to serve one industry, such as iron ore carrying lines in Cumbria, their fortunes were at the mercy of that industry. Iron and steel making was given to boom and bust and suffered a significant downturn in the 1870s, exacerbated by imports of cheaper and better ore from abroad. The iron mines which provided the WSMR's staple traffic stuttered to complete closure between 1879 and 1883. The line did not close immediately, two mixed trains a day continued to run until 1898, when all traffic ceased.

In 1907 the Somerset Mineral Syndicate made an attempt to revive the line, reopening Colton mine and starting a new bore at Timwood. Apart from a reopening day special on 4 July 1907 no passenger service was provided. The venture collapsed in March 1910.

== Abandonment ==
After closure in 1910 the line was subject to minimal maintenance until its metals were requisitioned for the war effort in 1917.

With neither track, rolling stock nor prospects an Act of Parliament was sought and passed to abandon the railway. Its assets were auctioned on 8 August 1924 and the company was wound up in 1925.

Evocative contemporary descriptions of the line in its later years have been preserved.

== Afterlife ==
Since closure the station building in Market Street has been converted into a private house complete with part of the platform. In 2016 the former locomotive shed was converted into use as a car repair workshop and the former goods shed stands in modern-day use.

In 2016 much of the route could still be traced on the ground, on maps and on satellite images. The incline from Comberow to Brendon Hill is a Listed structure.

Preceding station	Disused railways	Following station
Terminus	West Somerset Mineral Railway	Washford; Line and station closed
