= Luxborough Road railway station =

Former railway station in England

Luxborough Road

General information
- Location: East of Gupworthy, Brompton Regis, Somerset; England
- Coordinates: 51.1096°N 3.4560°W
- Grid reference: SS981354
- Platforms: 1

Other information
- Status: Disused

History
- Original company: West Somerset Mineral Railway

Key dates
- March 1861: Opened for goods
- 1865: opened for passengers
- 7 November 1898: Closed
Location

Luxborough Road (sometimes referred to as "Langham" or "Langham Hill") was an intermediate station on the West Somerset Mineral Railway (WSMR), which was built primarily to carry iron ore from mines to Watchet harbour in Somerset, England. The line was unconnected to any other, though it passed under what is now the West Somerset Railway south of the village of Watchet. The station was located west of the top of the line's most striking feature - a three quarters of a mile, rope-hauled incline at a gradient of 1 in 4 (25%).

The line's seven stations were designed by Rice Hopkins. Luxborough Road was one of the five which showed a clear family resemblance. It was built in anticipation of offering the usual goods and passenger facilities, but no regular passenger service ever ran south of Comberow. Almost immediately the building was erected it was converted to miners' accommodation by adding a lean-to at the rear. By 1900 the building was roofless and without windows, having been used as a source of materials for repairing other railway buildings.

== Services ==
The stone-built station opened for goods traffic in 1861. The railway introduced a passenger service in September 1865, connecting Watchet with the village of Washford and the hamlets of Roadwater and Comberow. Passengers were carried from Comberow up the rope-hauled incline to Brendon Hill and on through Luxborough Road to Gupworthy on a wagon, free of charge, but at their own risk.

The initial passenger service down the valley consisted of four trains a day out and back.

Like other railways built to serve one industry, such as iron ore carrying lines in Cumbria, their fortunes were at the mercy of that industry. Iron and steel making was given to boom and bust and suffered a significant downturn in the 1870s, exacerbated by imports of cheaper and better ore from abroad. The iron mines which provided the WSMR's staple traffic stuttered to complete closure between 1879 and 1883. The line did not close immediately, two mixed trains a day continued to run until 1898, when all traffic ceased.

In 1907 the Somerset Mineral Syndicate made an attempt to revive the line, reopening Colton mine and starting a new bore at Timwood. Apart from a reopening day special on 4 July 1907 no passenger service was provided. The syndicate did not reopen Luxborough Road or Gupworthy stations.

The venture collapsed in March 1910.

== Abandonment ==
After closure in 1910 the line was subject to minimal maintenance until its metals were requisitioned for the war effort in 1917.

With neither track, rolling stock nor prospects an Act of Parliament was sought and passed to abandon the railway. Its assets were auctioned on 8 August 1924 and the company was wound up in 1925.

Evocative contemporary descriptions of the line in its later years have been preserved.

== Afterlife ==
By 2016 much of the route could still be traced on the ground, on maps and on satellite images. The incline from Comberow to Brendon Hill is a Listed structure. No trace of Luxborough Road station remains. Less evidence of Luxborough Road station has survived than with other stations on the line, most is concerned with neighbouring pits, whose workers doubtless constituted the great majority of the station's patronage.

Preceding station	Disused railways	Following station
Brendon Hill; Line and station closed	West Somerset Mineral Railway	Gupworthy; Line and station closed
