= St Andrew's Church, Old Cleeve =

Church in Somerset, England

Church of St Andrew
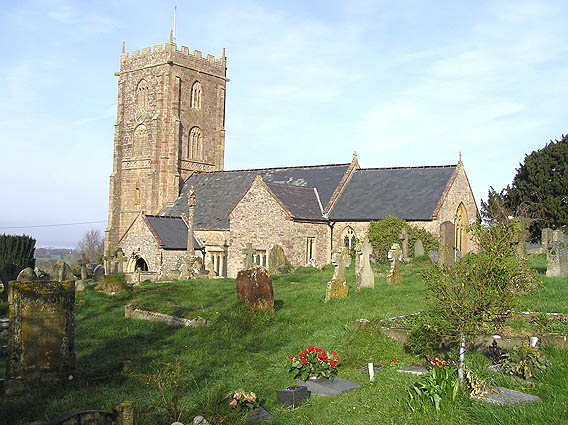

- Location within Somerset

General information
- Location: Old Cleeve, England
- Coordinates: 51.1683°N 3.3753°W
- Completed: 12th century

The Church of St Andrew in Old Cleeve, Somerset, England dates from the 12th century and has been designated by English Heritage as a Grade I listed building.

In the 12th century Robert FitzGerold gave the church to Bec Abbey in Le Bec Hellouin, Normandy, France, a Benedictine monastic foundation in Eure. Later in the same century William de Roumare gave it to Wells Cathedral and later it became the property of Cleeve Abbey until the dissolution of the monasteries.

The church was largely rebuilt in 1425 and the western tower was added around 1533.

The floor of the porch was cobbled with alabaster stones from the beach below the village and set in the shape of a heart during the 17th century.

The parish is part of the benefice of Old Cleeve, Leighland and Treborough within the Exmoor deanery of the Diocese of Bath and Wells.

== See also ==
- Grade I listed buildings in West Somerset
- List of Somerset towers
- List of ecclesiastical parishes in the Diocese of Bath and Wells
