= Washford Radio Museum =

Museum in Somerset, England

Coordinates: 51.1609°N 3.3489°W

Washford Radio Museum has been re-located to 'The Radio Museum' at the former Anchor Inn, 5, Anchor Street, Watchet, Somerset, TA23 0AZ.
