= Brendon Hill railway station =

Disused railway station in England

Brendon Hill
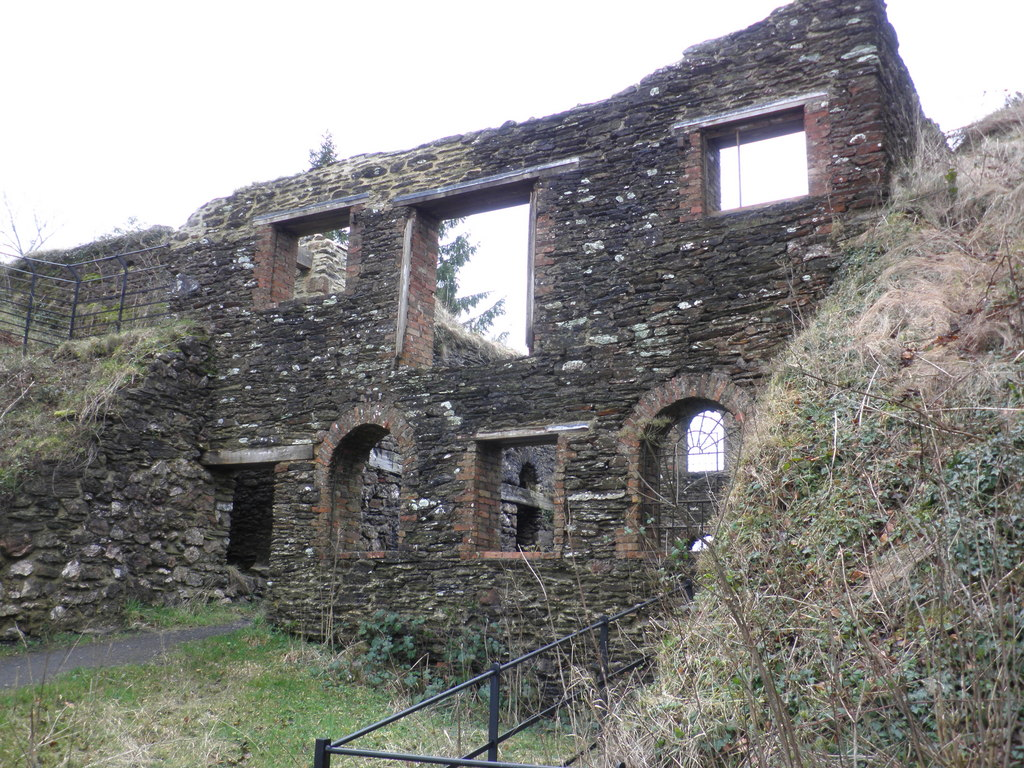
- Derelict wheelhouse at the summit of Brendon Hill incline

General information
- Location: Brendon Hill, Somerset; England
- Coordinates: 51.1000°N 3.3975°W
- Grid reference: ST022343
- Platforms: 1

Other information
- Status: Disused

History
- Original company: West Somerset Mineral Railway

Key dates
- March 1861: Opened for goods
- 1865: open for passengers
- 7 November 1898: Closed
- 1907: Reopened
- 1910: Closed
Location

Brendon Hill (occasionally referred to as "Raleigh's Cross") was an intermediate station on the West Somerset Mineral Railway (WSMR), which was built primarily to carry iron ore from mines to Watchet harbour in Somerset, England. The line was unconnected to any other, though it passed under what is now the West Somerset Railway south of the village of Watchet. The station was located at the top of the line's most striking feature - a three quarters of a mile, rope-hauled incline at a gradient of 1 in 4 (25%).

The line's seven stations were designed by Rice Hopkins. Brendon Hill was one of the five which showed a clear family resemblance. It was built in anticipation of offering the usual goods and passenger facilities, but no regular passenger service ever ran south of Comberow. The railway, the incline and especially the mines required labour, so a significant community grew up within sight of the station.

Despite its location, which remains remote to this day, Brendon Hill's situation at the head of the incline, together with the happy accidents of having an early railway photographer in the vicinity and exceptional historians interested in the railway has left a rich legacy of photographs of the station in context.

== Services ==
The stone-built station opened for goods traffic in 1857. A passenger service began in September 1865, connecting Watchet with the village of Washford and the hamlets of Roadwater and Comberow. Passengers were carried from Comberow up the rope-hauled incline to Brendon Hill and on to Gupworthy on a wagon, free of charge, but at their own risk. As no fares were collected no tickets were issued to or from Brendon Hill.

The initial passenger service to Comberow consisted of four trains a day out and back.

Like other railways built to serve one industry, such as iron ore carrying lines in Cumbria, their fortunes were at the mercy of that industry. Iron and steel making was given to boom and bust and suffered a significant downturn in the 1870s, exacerbated by imports of cheaper and better ore from abroad. The iron mines which provided the WSMR's staple traffic stuttered to complete closure between 1879 and 1883. The line did not close immediately, two mixed trains a day continued to run until 1898, when all traffic ceased.

In 1907 the Somerset Mineral Syndicate made an attempt to revive the line, reopening Colton mine and starting a new bore at Timwood. Apart from a reopening day special on 4 July 1907 no passenger service was provided. The Colton mine was two miles from Brendon Hill, so the Syndicate built a 2 ft gauge steam-hauled tramway, complete with its own rope-hauled incline and a wooden trestle viaduct, to bring iron ore from the pit to Brendon Hill, where it was tipped into standard gauge wagons to be lowered down the main incline to Comberow then hauled to Watchet harbour bound for the furnaces of Ebbw Vale. The Syndicate used Brendon Hill station building as offices.

The venture collapsed in March 1910.

== Abandonment ==
After closure in 1910 the line was subject to minimal maintenance until its metals were requisitioned for the war effort in 1917. This process entailed the demolition of the incline winding house at Brendon Hill, which was effected by the over-enthusiastic use of explosives.

With neither track, rolling stock nor prospects an Act of Parliament was sought and passed to abandon the railway. Its assets were auctioned on 8 August 1924 and the company was wound up in 1925.

Evocative contemporary descriptions of the line in its later years have been preserved.

== Afterlife ==
By 2016 much of the route could still be traced on the ground, on maps and on satellite images. The incline from Comberow to Brendon Hill is a Listed structure. Brendon Hill station building has survived as a dwelling and is also Listed.

Preceding station	Disused railways	Following station
Comberow; Line and station closed	West Somerset Mineral Railway	Luxborough Road; Line and station closed
