= Gupworthy railway station =

Former railway station in England

Gupworthy
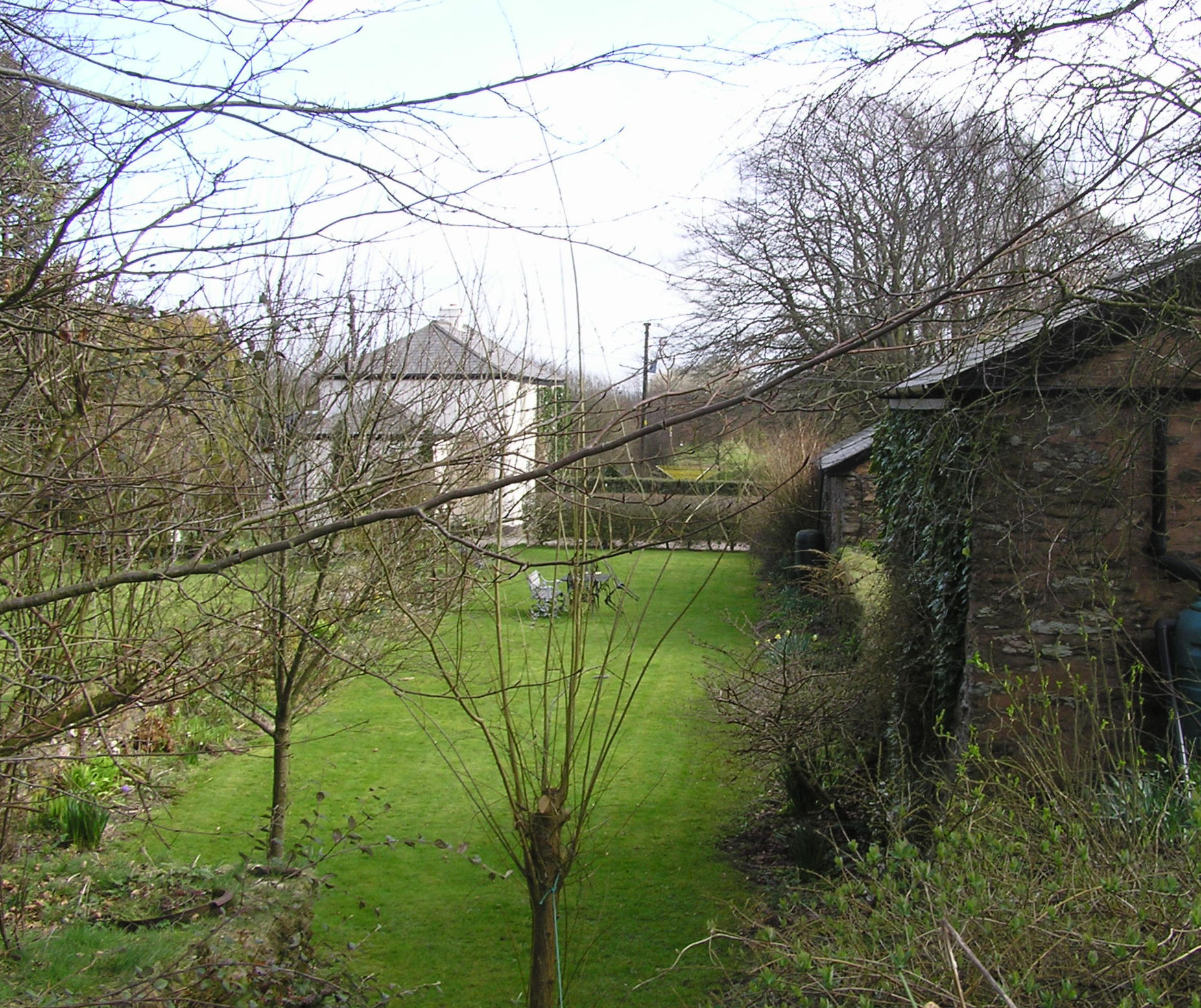
- The white house was Gupworthy railway station

General information
- Location: Gupworthy, Brompton Regis, Somerset; England
- Coordinates: 51.1099°N 3.4832°W
- Grid reference: SS962355
- Platforms: 1

Other information
- Status: Disused

History
- Original company: West Somerset Mineral Railway

Key dates
- March 1861: Opened for goods
- 1865: opened for passenger service
- 7 November 1898: Closed
Location

Gupworthy (sometimes referred to as "Goosemoor") was originally intended as an intermediate station on the West Somerset Mineral Railway (WSMR), but neither the proposed extension to Heath Poult nor that to Joyce's Cleeve was built, leaving Gupworthy as the line's southwestern terminus. The WSMR was built primarily to carry iron ore from mines to Watchet harbour in Somerset, England. The line was unconnected to any other, though it passed under what is now the West Somerset Railway south of the village of Watchet. The station was located west of the top of the line's most striking feature - a three quarters of a mile, rope-hauled incline at a gradient of 1 in 4 (25%).

From 1876 to 1883 a horse-drawn tramway brought iron ore from Kennesome Hill mine to the station, where it was transferred to WSMR wagons.

The line's seven stations were designed by Rice Hopkins. Uniquely, no photograph of the station as built has been published, so whether it resembled all the others except Watchet is not known. It was built in anticipation of offering the usual goods and passenger facilities, but no regular passenger service ever ran south of Comberow. Before it was finished the building was converted into two dwellings and has now been remodelled.

== Services ==
The stone-built station opened for goods traffic in 1861. The railway introduced a passenger service in September 1865, connecting Watchet with the village of Washford and the hamlets of Roadwater and Comberow. Passengers were carried from Comberow up the rope-hauled incline to Brendon Hill and on through Luxborough Road to Gupworthy on a wagon, free of charge, but at their own risk. As no fares were collected no tickets were issued to or from Gupworthy. Sources are unclear whether the station was ever staffed or carried any paying goods traffic, though texts imply that any goods traffic was handled at the nearby goods shed.

The initial passenger service down the valley consisted of four trains a day out and back.

Like other railways built to serve one industry, such as iron ore carrying lines in Cumbria, their fortunes were at the mercy of that industry. Iron and steel making was given to boom and bust and suffered a significant downturn in the 1870s, exacerbated by imports of cheaper and better ore from abroad. The iron mines which provided the WSMR's staple traffic stuttered to complete closure between 1879 and 1883. The line did not close immediately, two mixed trains a day continued to run until 1898, when all traffic ceased.

In 1907 the Somerset Mineral Syndicate made an attempt to revive the line, reopening Colton mine and starting a new bore at Timwood. Apart from a reopening day special on 4 July 1907 no passenger service was provided. The syndicate did not reopen Luxborough Road or Gupworthy stations.

The venture collapsed in March 1910.

== Abandonment ==
After closure in 1910 the line was subject to minimal maintenance until its metals were requisitioned for the war effort in 1917.

With neither track, rolling stock nor prospects an Act of Parliament was sought and passed to abandon the railway. Its assets were auctioned on 8 August 1924 and the company was wound up in 1925.

Evocative contemporary descriptions of the line in its later years have been preserved.

== Afterlife ==
By 2016 much of the route could still be traced on the ground, on maps and on satellite images. The incline from Comberow to Brendon Hill is a Listed structure. Very little remains on the ground to indicate either the station, the standard and narrow gauge railways or the mines, houses and shop which once existed at Gupworthy.

Preceding station	Disused railways	Following station
Luxborough Road; Line and station closed	West Somerset Mineral Railway	Terminus
