= Washford =

Village in Somerset, England

Coordinates: 51.1616°N 3.3653°W

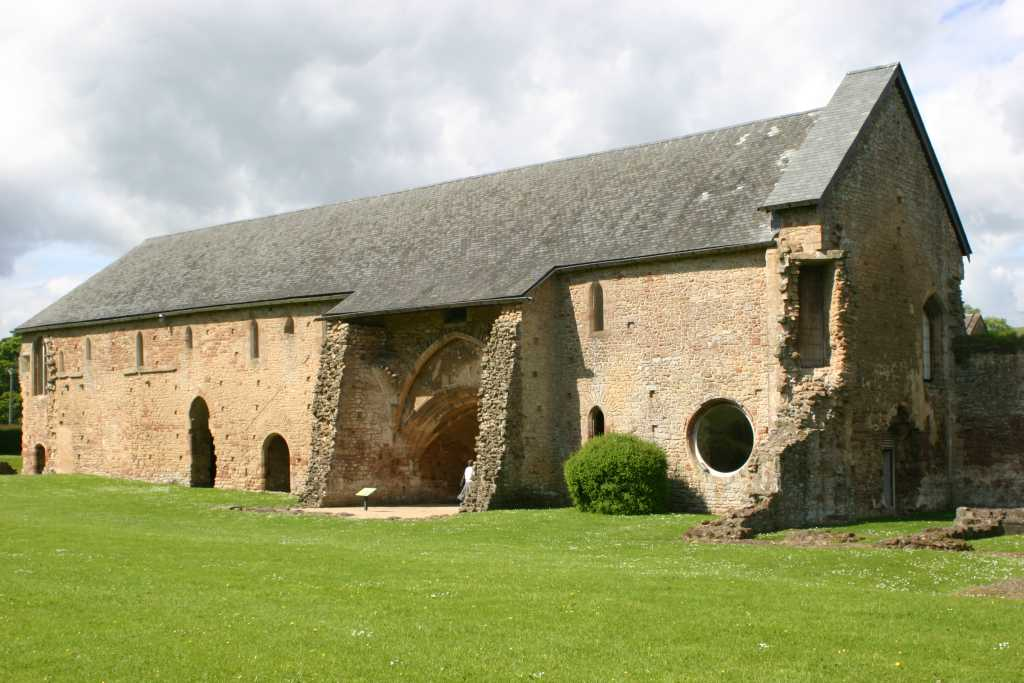
- The dormitory, Cleeve Abbey, Washford

- Location within Somerset
- OS grid reference: ST045415
- Civil parish: Old Cleeve
- Unitary authority: Somerset Council
- Ceremonial county: Somerset
- Region: South West
- Country: England
- Sovereign state: United Kingdom
- Post town: WATCHET
- Postcode district: TA23
- Dialling code: 01984
- Police: Avon and Somerset
- Fire: Devon and Somerset
- Ambulance: South Western
- UK Parliament: Tiverton and Minehead

Washford is a village on the Washford River in the civil parish of Old Cleeve, Somerset, England. The village is next to Cleeve Abbey, one of the best-preserved medieval monasteries in England. It centred in a valley close to the Bristol Channel on the A39 road 7 miles (11 km) east of the resort town of Minehead and 2 miles (3 km) southwest of the port of Watchet.

The village lies on the route of the Somerset Way and Celtic Way Exmoor Option.

== Geography ==
Washford is 1 mile (1.6 km) southeast of Old Cleeve. The parish is in Somerset Council unitary authority area.

Washford railway station is a station on the West Somerset Railway, a steam-operated heritage railway. The station is the headquarters of the Somerset and Dorset Railway Trust and contains a number of historic artefacts from the Somerset and Dorset Railway. The village also had a station on the West Somerset Mineral Railway.

Since 1933 there has been a broadcasting station at Washford. The front parts of the old transmitter building are now part of the Tropiquaria wildlife park and house their tropical hall, aquarium, the Washford Radio Museum and the Shadowstring Puppet Theatre.

Washford has a primary school, Old Cleeve Church of England School, which currently educates about 100 three- to nine-year-old children. Washford has a few shops, including a post office and a hairdresser.

== Landmarks ==
Washford has a Methodist chapel, which is a Grade II listed building.

The village of Washford has two inns: the Washford Inn and the White Horse Inn, which is a free house.

By the river and preserved watermill is Abbey Mill House, which is 18th-century and is also a listed building.
