= Mining on the Brendon Hills =

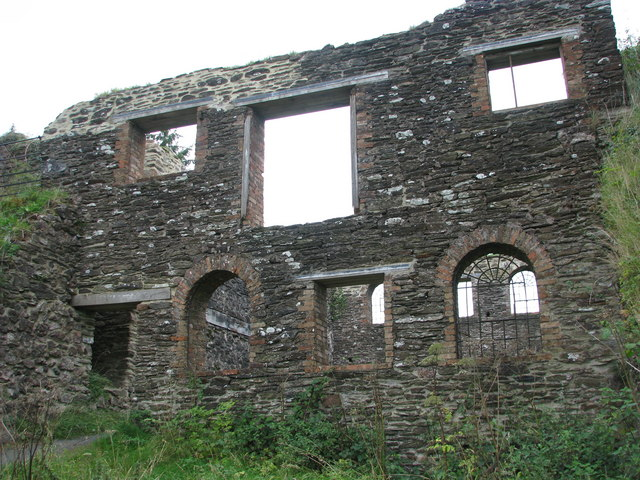
Ruins of the winding house at the top of the incline on the West Somerset Mineral Railway

The Brendon Hills are a range of hills in western Somerset, England. The hills merge level into the eastern side of Exmoor and are included within the Exmoor National Park. Iron ore and other minerals have been extracted for industrial purposes, primarily by the Brendon Hills Iron Ore Company in the later half of the 19th century.

== Geology ==
The Brendon Hills are largely formed from the Morte Slates, a thick faulted and folded sequence of Devonian age sedimentary rocks. An east-west aligned anticline/syncline pair known as the Brendon Anticline and Brendon Syncline folds these rocks. The fold couplet is itself offset by displacement of the rocks on the NNW-SSE aligned Timberscombe Fault System. Over the centuries they have been mined for minerals, notably ironstone from which iron is extracted for making steel.

== History ==
Where lodes of iron ore reached the surface they were worked using bell pits from Roman times.

== 19th century ==
In the mid-nineteenth century, the proprietors of the Ebbw Vale Iron Works acquired an interest in iron ore deposits in the Brendon Hills. Iron ore had been known there for centuries but not exploited industrially until the Brendon Hills Iron Ore Company was formed in 1853. Initially goethite/hematite was extracted and later unoxidised siderite.

At an altitude of over 1,000 feet (300 m) and remote from usable roads, the company needed a form of transport to get the ore to South Wales. The West Somerset Mineral Railway, which included a 0.75 miles (1.21 km) long gravity worked incline on a gradient of 1 in 4, was built to take the ore to Watchet Harbour where it was loaded onto ships to be sent to Ebbw Vale for smelting. At Burrow Farm Mine a 25 inches (640 mm) Cornish beam engine was installed around 1868 to pump water out of the mine. The mines provided employment for an average of 245 people between 1873 and 1882. Accommodation was also built for the mine workers.

Though sometimes productive, no nineteenth century iron mine on the Brendon Hills was profitable and the venture as a whole was financially ruinous. From 1852 to 1883 a little over three quarters of a million tons of usable ore was delivered to Ebbw Vale, each ton costing the company £1.25 to produce and deliver for which it received 75p. Net losses amounted to £762,000. Furthermore, the industry as a whole was prone to boom and bust, with a sharp decline from the early 1880s acting as the coup-de-grace. In 1907 another venture, the Somerset Mineral Syndicate, leased the railway and resumed mining.

Several of the structures associated with the mines can still be seen. These include the ironstone mine ventilation flue in Chargot Wood, and the remains of the Carnarvon New Pit.

== Individual mines ==
Many mines have been recorded on the hills. The following operated at various times between 1837 and 1909.

=== Baker's pit ===
This mine is sometimes referred to as "Baker's mine" or simply "Bakers". Primarily aimed at Manganese, this pit was served by a siding off the West Somerset Mineral Railway (WSMR). It was an early pit latterly developed and briefly productive in iron ore in the years 1881–2, but it closed in May 1883. Scant evidence remains that the pit ever existed.

=== Bearland Wood mine ===
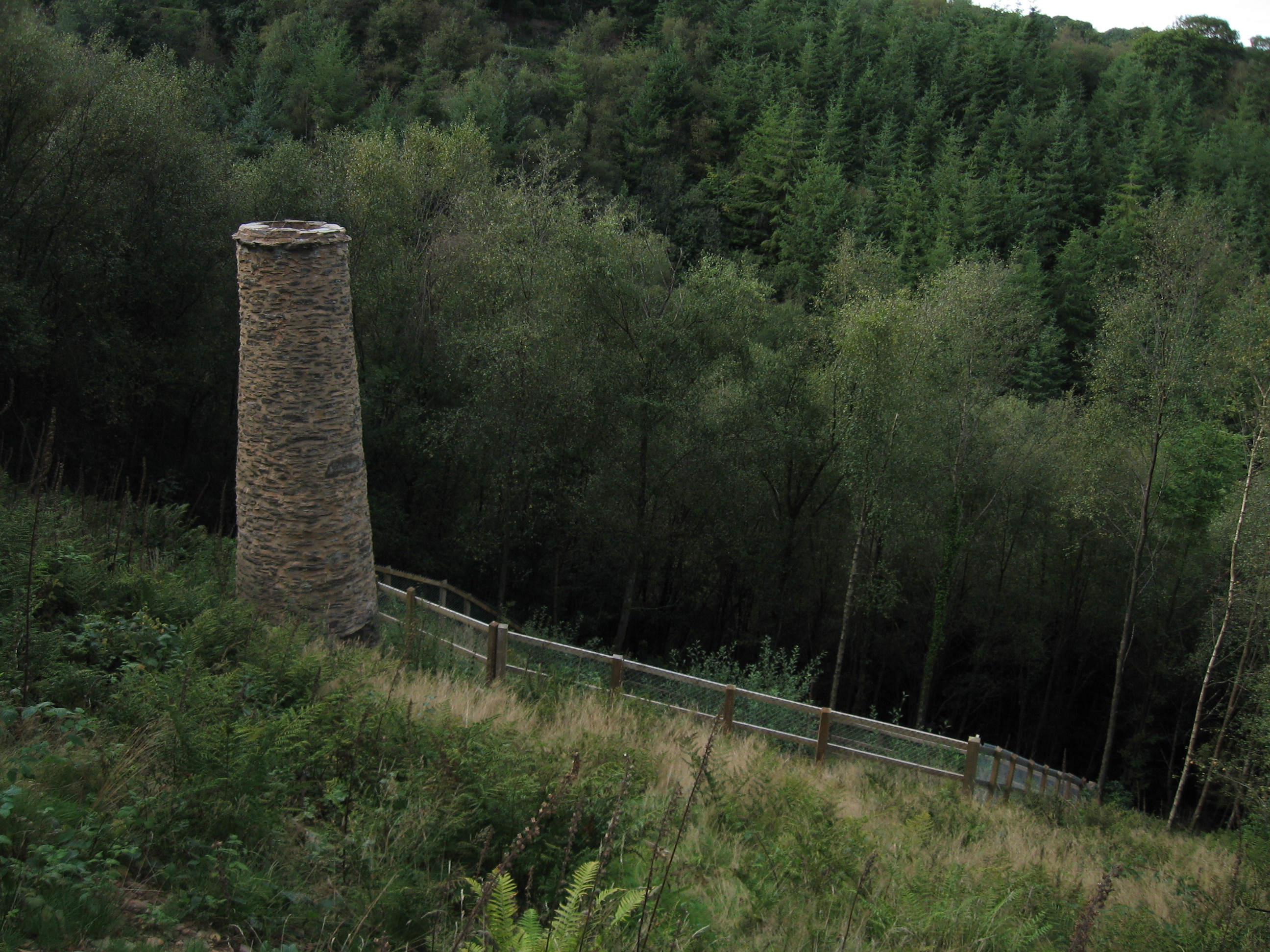
Bearland Wood ventilation flue

The first adit was started at this iron mine in 1854, aiming to work towards Gupworthy. Little ore was found and working had ceased by 1864. Later that year the Mines Captain, Morgan Morgans, decided to drive a new adit, which proved very successful, yielding 12000 tons of brown Haematite which was taken to Langham Hill pit by an incline operated by horse powered whims. The ore was loaded on to WSMR wagons at Langham Hill. This incline was abandoned in 1866–7 when Bearland Wood mine was joined underground with Langham Hill pit.

Mines on the tops of hills are usually sunk from above, with adits for drainage or access driven laterally to the hillside from the ore, coal or other target mineral. Bearland Wood mine was worked the other way round, with vertical working following lateral boring.

Bearland Wood faced the universal mining problem of ventilation in a way which was both very old and radically new. Most industrial age mines were drained and ventilated using pumps, typically powered by steam engines. Morgans equipped Bearland Wood with a ventilation flue where a chimney stack was built above the mine's upward shaft and a coal-fired furnace was placed at the foot of the chimney. The furnace sucked air from the mine shaft which sucked fresh air from the lateral adit in turn. The air flow was guided by wooden ducts so that it always passed through areas where men worked. Miners extended or redirected the ducts as the working faces moved. This method long predated steam pumps, but as Morgans was erecting it at Bearland Wood the Mines Inspector at Risca Colliery (near where Morgans had been a colliery manager) declared steam pumps to be unsatisfactory and ordered their older ventilation furnaces to be reinstated. The ventilation flue at Bearland Wood is a scheduled monument. Its conservation was supported by the Heritage Lottery Fund.

=== Betsy mine ===
This iron mine was served by a siding off the WSMR, it is sometimes referred to as "New Langham Mine". It was the last new mine in the area when it opened around 1875. It closed in 1883. Almost no trace remains of the mine's existence.

=== Blackland mine ===
This iron mine was operated independently of the Ebbw Vale Company near Withypool, west of the Brendon Hills. It operated from about 1875 to 1881 then briefly in 1895, leaving a large bank of ore stockpiled on site. In 1907 a Withypool mining company started transporting ore by traction engine to Minehead to be shipped north, but this ended in October. The Somerset Mineral Syndicate added this to their portfolio of Colton and Timwood and built a rope worked incline powered by a stationary engine to lower ore to the road. The workings were prospected but the ore sent to Minehead was almost all from the stockpile.

=== Burrow Farm mine ===
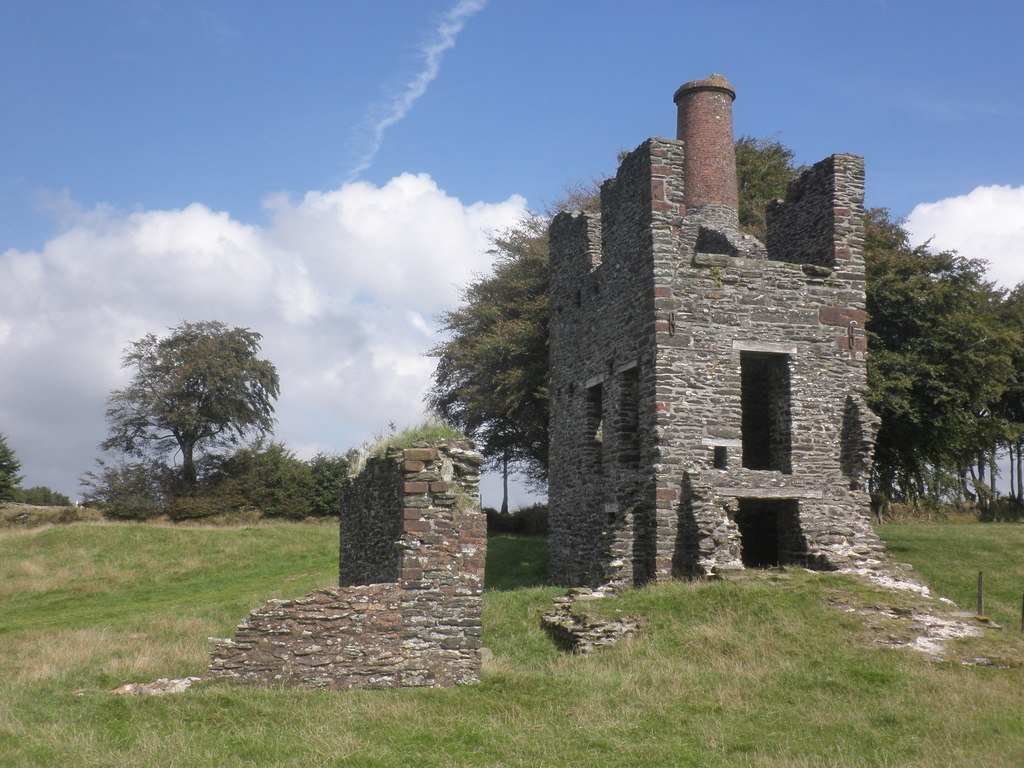
Burrow Farm Engine House

This iron mine was served by a siding off the WSMR. It closed around 1868. The shell of its engine house, which was moved lock, stock and barrel from Langham Hill mine, stands today, the ore field's only engine house to do so.

=== Carew mine ===
Sinking the shaft of this iron mine may have started in 1865. The last ore appears to have been raised in 1871. A photograph shows that ore from Carew was handled separately by the WSMR so that charges and income could be allocated accordingly. When the mine was surveyed in 1883 the shaft was flooded. Carew's ore was a target for the 1907 venture at Timwood Tunnel, but that venture failed before any ore was reached. All that can be seen in modern times is a small disturbance on the surface near a car park.

=== Carnarvon new pit ===
This iron mine was served by a siding off the WSMR, on the opposite side of the line from Carnarvon Old Pit. It opened in 1866 and initially yielded good ore in quantity, but it closed in 1882. The ruins of the buildings have now been scheduled as an ancient monument. Carnarvon and Raleigh's Cross mines were both very wet. Complex interlocking drainage and flood prevention features were installed.

=== Carnarvon old pit ===
This iron mine was next to the WSMR, on the opposite side from Carnarvon New Pit. It is sometimes referred to as "Old Carnarvon Pit". It closed in the early 1860s.

=== Colton mine ===
This iron mine is sometimes referred to as "Coltonpits" and occasionally as "Colton Pits".

There is evidence of ancient mining at Colton, with the main site visible on maps just over 3 km ENE of Brendon Hill. The site was investigated in 1847, but throughout the period up to 1875 when the WSMR was flourishing Colton mine was described as "insignificant", though in the early 1880s, just as the whole Brendon venture was on the point of collapse, output was increasing and an extra siding on the WSMR was sought but not started.

When the Somerset Mineral Syndicate Ltd attempted to resurrect mining and the WSMR from 1907 to 1910 it reopened Colton mine, but entered it through what had been a drainage adit in Galloping Bottom, some distance north west and downhill of the original workings. This location meant that whilst underground costs might have been reduced, it was difficult to get the ore to the WSMR. The original idea was to build an aerial ropeway, but a wholly new 2 ft (610 mm) gauge tramway was built instead. This incorporated a 600 yards (550 m) incline to get the ore up to the top of the hill, followed by a two-mile run (including a timber viaduct) to Brendon Hill where the ore was tipped into standard gauge wagons which were lowered down the larger incline then hauled to Watchet harbour.

The aim of developing Colton mine was to give an income until the Syndicate's main hope - Timwood - started to produce, but output was disappointing (a mere 4800 tons of ore was raised in 1908-10) and what ore was produced caked furnaces and proved almost unsaleable. In desperation the Syndicate erected plant at Washford to turn the poor ore into briquettes, thereby reducing volume, mass and impurities, but the undercapitalised venture failed in 1909 and all mining ceased, including Colton. The Syndicate voted to be wound up on 24 March 1910 and its assets were auctioned off on 28 June that year. in modern times only the faintest traces of the workings, incline and narrow gauge railway can be detected.

=== Eisen Hill mine ===
Eisen Hill is named "Ison Hill" on OS maps and sometimes "Eyson Hill" elsewhere.

This iron mine opened in 1854 and stuttered to an end by 1877, with patchy result between. The mine was in soft ground which warranted different mining techniques. The company had a powder magazine and three cottages near the mine, one of which was used as the mine offices. The WSMR took the first steps towards seeking powers to extend their line from Gupworthy (where at least some Eisen Hill output was transferred to their rails) to Joyce's Cleeve to tap their product, but its poor prospects and their financial straits led them to back off. No buildings survive.

=== Elworthy Mine ===
This iron mine is sometimes referred to as "Yeanon" or "Yennan". A trial shaft was sunk in 1875 and, whilst seven levels were developed, little ore was found. In Jones' words it "never amounted to much." It had closed by 1883. A Liverpool syndicate investigated the mine in 1907, employing around a dozen men, but nothing came of it. Only a small mound remains to suggest any workings ever took place.

=== Gupworthy new pit ===
Digging started on this iron mine in 1871. In 1879 it closed with its neighbours, but was one of the few which reopened later that year, reaching its maximum depth of 427 feet (130 m) in November 1882, only to close with the rest of the orefield in June 1883. The WSMR built a branch to serve the pit, with a siding to bring coal to the engine house. By 2011 no visible trace of the pit remained.

=== Gupworthy old pit ===
In 1863–4, the WSMR built is western extension through this iron mine's pit yard, which rivalled that at Raleigh Cross in size. It had been taken over and revived in 1852 and was said in the mid-1850s to have "good ore in workable quantities" which significantly exceeded pre-railway haulage capacity, leading to stockpiles. In the area's mid-1870s "peak years" the principal contributors were Raleigh's Cross mine and Gupworthy old pit. It closed with its neighbours in 1879, being one of the few which re-opened later that year. The mine reached its maximum depth of 461 feet (141 m) in October 1881, closing with its neighbours in June 1883. On closure machinery was brought to the surface and the mine allowed to flood. Some plant was returned to South Wales, most eventually went for scrap. Closing the mine gave the WSMR an additional problem, as the only water crane south of the incline was fed from Gupworthy Old pit. The crane and header tank were moved to Brendon Hill.

Gupworthy old pit had a permanent engine house, where a boy was killed in an explosion in November 1881. The miners' cottages were referred to as "The Square".

When the WSMR's remaining assets were auctioned in 1924 the trackbed through the pit was sold to local landowners. Some remains were identifiable in 1964, but in 2011 "not a wrack remains save for a datestone of 1864, rescued from the engine house."

=== Higher Goosemoor mine ===
This mine is sometimes referred to, perhaps ironically, as "California". With others it closed in 1879, but reopened later in the year, eventually reaching a depth of 257 feet (78 m) with four levels and two shallow secondary drifts, known as Richard's Pit. This site survived in production until all mining ceased across the Brendons in 1883. Portable pumping machinery was used and ore was carted to the railhead at Gupworthy.

=== Kennesome Hill mine ===
This mine is sometimes referred to as Kennisham Hill.

A Roman coin was found in old workings at Kennesome Hill, suggesting great age. In Victorian times it had been worked on a small scale before 1867. In 1871 "Curtis's Drift" was started, reaching 100 feet (30 m) by September 1874. Considerable development took place at Kennesome Hill, including an aerial ropeway (referred to locally as the "Flying Machine") to convey output to a siding next to Langham Hill pit, where it was tipped into WSMR wagons. This arrangement lasted until 1876, after which ore was taken from the mine to Gupworthy by a 660 yards (600 m) horse-drawn tramway. The mine closed with its neighbours in 1879, but re-opened later the same year, going on with the Gupworthy pits to become the most productive of the orefield's final years; it closed for good in September 1883. In November 1877 the company was fined for not providing a proper platform for workers at the mine.

The mine had a permanent rotary steam engine for both pumping and winding. Unlike most other such buildings in the area its engine house was not demolished for its stone and still stood into the 1970s. Its state, however, was "parlous", so the Forestry Commission blew it up on 7 March 1978, leaving only the pumping engine's granite base as a memorial, albeit at some distance from the site of the mine. By 2011 this block was all which remained to show the mine had ever existed.

=== Langham Hill pit ===
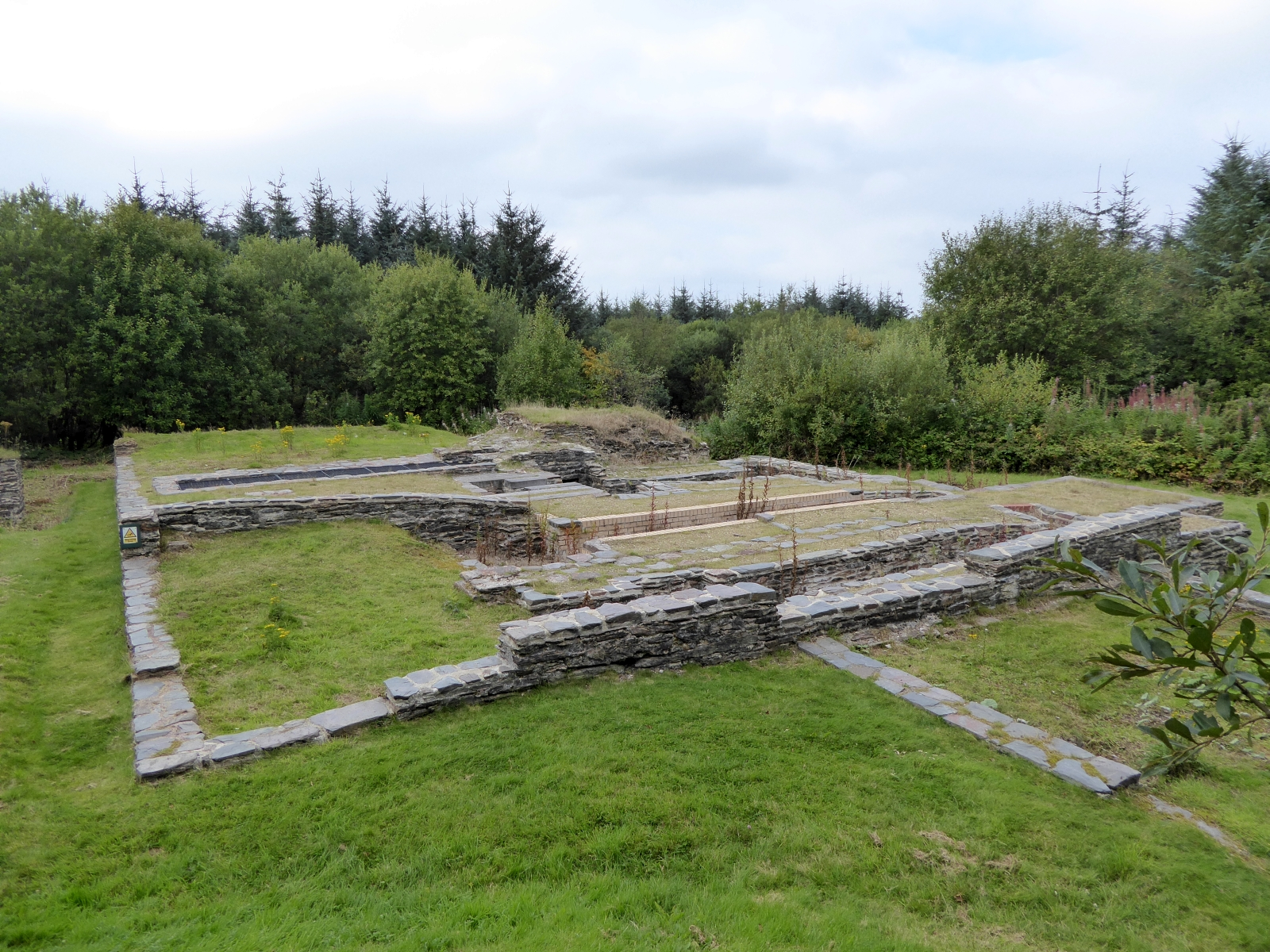
The ruins of the Langham Hill Engine House

This iron mine was served by a siding off the WSMR. Work started on the mine in 1866 and it closed in 1883. The adit was horizontal into the hillside. In 1877 the company was fined for failing to provide proper ventilation, proper fencing and proper drying facilities for miners' clothes.

As well as ore lifted from the mine itself the site served for periods as railheads for ore from Kennesome Hill and Bearland Wood mines. Neither route was straightforward. Ore travelled from Kennesome Hill via an aerial ropeway, thereby crossing a sharp, deep valley and ore travelled up from Bearland Wood via an incline operated by horse powered whims.

The mine had a substantial stone and slate engine house with a rotary beam pumping and winding engine. In 1878–9 the machinery and its engine house were dismantled, moved to Burrow Farm mine and re-erected, leaving bare foundations at Langham Hill. When the mines closed the Ebbw Vale Company not only had to bear considerable losses but it also became liable for duties and charges it had entered into in the heady early days when the Brendon Hills seemed like Klondyke. James Insole, owner of the Chargot Estate, entered litigation with the company for costs associated with the cessation of mining. This eventually went to arbitration, where the main beneficiaries were lawyers and the main loser was the Ebbw Vale Company. In the midst of this the Ebbw Vale company covered the Langham Hill engine house foundations with the pit tip, landscaping the site to appease Insole. Remarkably, this had a beneficial outcome, as it "preserved" the foundations so that when the Exmoor National Park Authority excavated them in 1995–8 they were found to be in good order. They can be visited to this day.

=== Raleigh's Cross mine ===
Before its expansion in the 1850s the mine was referred to as the "Tone mine".

This iron mine was served by a 310 yards (280 m) branch off the WSMR, which was relayed early in 1876. It was one of the mines which Ebenezer Rogers examined when he started the major development of the Brendon Hills orefield in the 1850s, crystallised by the formation of the Brendon Hills Iron Ore Company in 1853. The workings at Raleigh's Cross were progressively deepened, reaching a vertical depth of 94 feet (29 m) in 1858. Mining in the area before this time had been sufficiently small scale for horse-drawn cartage of ore to be sufficient, but "the mines at Gupworthy and Raleigh's Cross .. proved the existence of good ore in workable quantities" making industrial-scale transport necessary, this in turn led to the formation the WSMR company (royal assent was granted on 16 July 1855) and construction of the railway itself, which was in full operation to Raleigh's Cross by March 1861.

The mine was substantial both above and below ground. In 1857 an extensive and expensive adit was driven from the lower workings to emerge from the hillside below Sea View House. This involved extensive trialling of a tunnel boring machine which proved "greatly underpowered and in danger of knocking itself to pieces". This adit drained the mine to a depth of 110 feet (34 m), but considerable machinery was needed to drain the mine's eventual depth of 692 feet (211 m) (achieved in 1879, the year the orefield first closed) and to wind ore to the surface. Raleigh's cross mine was the only one in the orefield to require an engine for each role. The engine which wound ore to the surface was mounted in the first floor of the substantial pithead buildings, it pulled the mine's narrow gauge tramway wagons along the sloping drift out of the ground and onto a platform above a standard gauge siding so the ore could be tipped directly into wagons beneath. The same building also housed a heated room for miners to dry their clothes and a Miners' Literature Institute. Raleigh's Cross and the two Carnarvon mines formed the nucleus of the mining community of Brendon Hill.

In the years up to 1867 Raleigh's Cross and Carnarvon New had produced over 100,000 tons of ore, peaking at an output of 400 tons per week. At Raleigh's Cross in 1856 two men, both until recently agricultural labourers, attempted to tamp a black powder explosive charge with an iron instead of wooden rod. A spark ensued, detonating the charge; one of the men died and the other was badly injured. The coroner's verdict was "accidental death". Raleigh's Cross and its neighbours were wet mines, necessitating extensive works, plant, interconnections and flood countermeasures.

The mine closed abruptly along with its neighbours in 1879, but reopened later the same year. It finally succumbed in 1882, followed by complete closure of the orefield in 1883. The branch to the site was lifted in 1884 and the engines dismantled and sent to Ebbw Vale for reuse. The mine buildings were blown up by the Syndicate to provide ballast to gravity work the incline and, in 1909, hardcore infill for the timber jetty at Watchet.

Only faint traces of the mine remain, visible only to the knowing eye.

=== Smallcombe Bottom mine ===
This iron mine was also known as "Smoky Bottom mine". It had closed by 1867. All traces have been removed or landscaped.

=== Timwood tunnel ===
The workings at Timwood are sometimes referred to as "Timwood adit" or simply "Timwood".

Timwood tunnel was the last venture in the orefield. It was the brainchild of the Somerset Mineral Syndicate Ltd which was formed on 11 March 1907 to work mines and lease the WSMR to carry output to Watchet harbour. The syndicate took over Blackland and Colton mines, as described above, and started new workings at Timwood.

The Syndicate expected Timwood to be its prize asset. It was the only mine at the foot of the Brendons, aiming to do on a grand scale what some mines had done on a smaller scale at the top, i.e. drill horizontally into the hillside (or even better, drill at a gentle upward slope to drain water and assist tramming ore and waste) until it encountered veins of ore previously worked from above at Carew and Raleigh's Cross mines. This approach had been suggested but not tried in 1854. It sought to reduce the cost and effort involved in pumping water and raising ore to the surface only to lower it down again using the incline to Comberow. It came at the price of having to drill much further to reach ore and carried an increased risk of not reaching ore at all.

As at Colton the workings at Timwood used 16 in (406 mm) gauge hopper wagons underground, but the mine entrance was so close to the WSMR and so close to its level that wagons could be hand worked to a movable crossing over the WSMR line then tipped direct into wagons bound for the harbour, thereby avoiding multiple handling. Apart from small amounts discovered while pursuing their main target, this method of working remained an aspiration, because the Syndicate ran out of money in 1909, it had many costs and almost no income. It voted to be wound up on 24 March 1910 and its assets were auctioned off on 28 June that year, with Timwood's tunnel 1,600 feet (490 m) long "but still well short of ore-bearing ground".

Unlike mine buildings at the hill top, those at Timwood were small and appeared temporary, none being built of stone or brick. The Robey steam engine from the incline winding house was installed to drive the compressor which powered the drills used to create holes for explosive charges. A second small building served as a smithy and the third was a mess and a dry for miners' clothes. The mine has left no visible evidence above ground.

=== Withiel Hill mine ===
This iron mine, also known as "Floriel Hill Mine" and "Florey Hill mine", was sunk in 1866, but little development work was undertaken. It continued to give regular, three-figure quarterly tonnages until it closed in April 1876.

== Sources ==
- Jones, Michael H. (2011). The Brendon Hills Iron Mines and the West Somerset Mineral Railway. Lydney: Lightmoor Press. ISBN 978-1-899889-53-2. OCLC 795179029.
- Mitchell, Vic; Smith, Keith (1990). Branch Line to Minehead: Preservation Perfection. Midhurst: Middleton Press. ISBN 978-0-906520-80-2.
- Sellick, Roger J. (1981) [1976]. The Old Mineral Line (2nd ed.). Dulverton: Exmoor Press. ISBN 978-1-84114-692-8.
- Sellick, Roger J. (1970) [1962]. The West Somerset Mineral Railway and the story of the Brendon Hills Iron Mines (2nd ed.). Newton Abbot: David and Charles. ISBN 978-0-7153-4961-8.
