= Roadwater =

Village in Somerset, England

Coordinates: 51.1376°N 3.3806°W

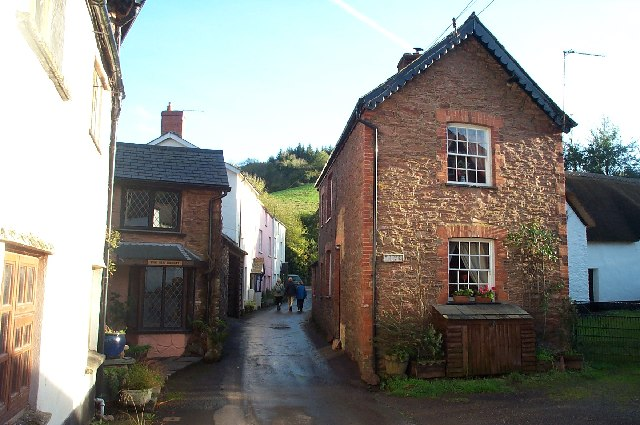

- Location within Somerset
- OS grid reference: ST035385
- Civil parish: Old Cleeve
- Unitary authority: Somerset Council
- Ceremonial county: Somerset
- Region: South West
- Country: England
- Sovereign state: United Kingdom
- Post town: WATCHET
- Postcode district: TA23
- Dialling code: 01984
- Police: Avon and Somerset
- Fire: Devon and Somerset
- Ambulance: South Western
- UK Parliament: Tiverton and Minehead

Roadwater is a village 3 miles (5 km) south-west of Williton, on the northern edge of the Exmoor National Park, in Somerset, England.

== History ==
The village was formerly known as Rode and had a mill by 1243. During the 18th and 19th centuries there were a large number of mills set beside the Washford River. Manor Mills survives and has been designated by English Heritage as a Grade II listed building.

An Ebenezer Chapel was built in 1842, which was succeeded by the current Methodist chapel in 1907 as part of a strong temperance movement which began in 1868 under the influence of the Trevelyans of Nettlecombe. The mission church and school of St Luke were opened in the 1880s.

It has links via its own railway station, with the West Somerset Mineral Railway, which transported iron ore in the 19th century from the Brendon Hills to Watchet on the coast.

More recent history is demonstrated in the restoration of a World War II pillbox.

== Governance ==
Administratively, Roadwater forms part of the civil parish of Old Cleeve, a village situated 3 miles (5 km) to the north.

For local government purposes, since 1 April 2023, the village comes under the unitary authority of Somerset Council. Prior to this, it was part of the non-metropolitan district of Somerset West and Taunton (formed on 1 April 2019) and, before this, the district of West Somerset (established under the Local Government Act 1972).

It falls within the Tiverton and Minehead county constituency represented in the House of Commons of the Parliament of the United Kingdom. It elects one Member of Parliament (MP) by the first past the post system of election. The current MP is Rachel Gilmour, a member of the Liberal Democrats.

== Geography ==
Roadwater is a linear village, the northern section of which follows the course of the Washford River, in a deep wooded valley. In the centre of the village is a general store with Post Office and café. Adjacent to the store is the Village Hall and public recreation ground with Children's play area and cricket pitch.

The village is on the Coleridge Way footpath which opened in April 2005, and follows the walks taken by poet Samuel Taylor Coleridge, over the Quantock and Brendon Hills to Porlock, starting from Coleridge Cottage at Nether Stowey, where he once lived.

== Culture ==
An annual Village Fete takes place every summer on the recreation ground, to raise money for the upkeep of the Village Hall. The Village Hall hosts annual pantomimes, and usually a play, put on by the amateur dramatics society the Roadwater Players. The village also hosts regular music events at the Hall.

The Village Shop is next door to the Village Hall. Roadwater Village Community Shop is owned and run by Roadwater Residents. It's about 100 m from the Coleridge Way route across Exmoor.

The Valiant Soldier public house is a few hundred yards upriver from the Village Shop and provides meals and accommodation.

St Luke's Church (at the Methodist Chapel) is situated between the shop and the Valiant Soldier next to the old telephone-box which has been converted into the Roadwater Book Exchange.

== Notable residents ==
- John Morris Roberts CBE (1928–2003) a British historian and Warden of Merton College, Oxford, died in Roadwater.
