= List of scheduled monuments in West Somerset (A–G) =

West Somerset shown within Somerset and England

West Somerset was a local government district in the English county of Somerset. It merged with Taunton Deane to form Somerset West and Taunton on 1 April 2019. The council covered a largely rural area, with a population of 35,075 in an area of 740 square kilometres (290 sq mi). According to figures released by the Office for National Statistics in 2009, the population of West Somerset had the oldest average age in the United Kingdom at 52. The largest centres of population were the coastal towns of Minehead (population 10,000) and Watchet (4,400).

A scheduled monument is a nationally important archaeological site or monument which is given legal protection by being placed on a list (or "schedule") by the Secretary of State for Culture, Media and Sport; English Heritage takes the leading role in identifying such sites. The legislation governing this is the Ancient Monuments and Archaeological Areas Act 1979. The term "monument" can apply to the whole range of archaeological sites, and they are not always visible above ground. Such sites have to have been deliberately constructed by human activity. They range from prehistoric standing stones and burial sites, through Roman remains and medieval structures such as castles and monasteries, to later structures such as industrial sites and buildings constructed for the World Wars or the Cold War.

There are 201 (Note: Wood Barrow round barrow is included twice in the National Heritage List for England as it straddles the border between Somerset and Devon.) scheduled monuments in West Somerset. Some of the oldest, particularly on Exmoor and the Quantock Hills are Neolithic, Bronze Age or Iron Age including hillforts, cairns, bowl barrows and other tumulis. More recent sites include several motte-and-bailey castles and church or village crosses which date from the Middle Ages. The geography with large numbers of streams is reflected by the number of packhorse and other bridges included in the list. The mining history of the area is also represented by several sections of the West Somerset Mineral Railway and associated ruins of mine buildings which are now scheduled. The most recent monuments are World War II pillboxes. The monuments are listed below using the titles given in the English Heritage data sheets.

== Monuments ==
Name	Location	Type	Completed (Note: The date given is the date used by Historic England as significant for the initial building or that of an important part in the structure's description.)	Grid ref. (Note: The grid reference is based on the British national grid reference system, sometimes known as OSGB36, used by the Ordnance Survey.) Geo-coordinates	Notes	Entry number (Note: The "List Entry Number" is a unique number assigned to each listed building and scheduled monument by Historic England.)	Image	Ref.
Agnes Fountain	Selworthy	Holy well	Middle Ages	SS 90477 47370; 51°12′54″N 3°34′10″W	A medieval holy well formed from stone slabs.	1020827	Agnes Fountain	
Alderman's Barrow N of Almsworthy Common	Exford	Bowl barrow	Bronze Age	SS 83680 42326; 51°10′06″N 3°39′54″W	A bowl barrow 24 metres (79 ft) in diameter.	1006203	Alderman's Barrow N of Almsworthy Common More images	
Allerford New Bridge	Luccombe	Bridge	1630	SS 89989 46655; 51°12′31″N 3°34′34″W	A medieval stone bridge which was largely rebuilt in 1630 and again in 1866 over Horner Water.	1006197	Upload Photo	
Allerford packhorse bridge, immediately north of Cross Lane Farm	Allerford	Bridge	Middle Ages	SS 90512 46923; 51°12′58″N 3°34′09″W	Built as a crossing over the River Aller, it is thought to be medieval in origin. The 18 feet (5.5 m) wide pointed arch rises 8 feet (2.4 m) with a 4 feet (1.2 m) span half arch on the side for flood relief. Originally the bridge was 3.7 metres (12 ft) wide but another 1.8 metres (6 ft) was added in 1866.	1020776	Allerford packhorse bridge, immediately north of Cross Lane Farm More images	
Almsworthy Common: a stone alignment 560 m south west of Chetsford Bridge	Exford	Stone row	Late Neolithic to middle Bronze Age	SS 84309 41698; 51°09′46″N 3°39′21″W	Four rows of standing stones between 100 millimetres (3.9 in) and 700 millimetres (28 in) high. There are 14 stones in total.	1015017	Almsworthy Common: a stone alignment 560 m south west of Chetsford Bridge More images	
Bagley Iron Age defended settlement enclosure and deserted medieval farm	Luccombe	Earthworks	Iron Age and Middle Ages	SS 88227 42569; 51°10′17″N 3°36′01″W	Earthworks from a prehistoric defended settlement and medieval village.	1008468	Upload Photo	
Barle Bridge	Dulverton	Bridge	Middle Ages	SS 91207 27823; 51°02′22″N 3°33′11″W	A medieval five arch stone bridge over the River Barle which was widened in 1819 and further restored following flooding in the 1950s.	1006179	Barle Bridge More images	
Barlinch Priory	Brompton Regis	Priory	12th century	SS 92891 28999; 51°02′45″N 3°32′05″W	Barlynch Priory (also known as St Nicholas's Priory and sometimes spelled Barlich Priory) was Augustinian priory founded, by William de Say, between 1154 and 1189 and dissolved in 1537. The only visible remains are some fragments of walling attached to Barynch farmhouse. Some of the stained glass from a Jesse window at the Priory is now in the St Peter's Church in Huish Champflower. The priory has been added to the Heritage at Risk Register because of the risk of collapse.	1006213	Upload Photo	
Barrow and cairn cemetery on Black Hill, 490 m north west of Crowcombe Park Gate	Holford	Cairn and bowl barrows	Bronze Age	ST 14539 38227; 51°08′13″N 3°13′22″W	Four bowl barrows and a cairn make up the site of a Bronze Age cemetery on the Quantock Hills.	1019381	Upload Photo	
Barrow at Wilmot's Pool and a cairn 45 m to the north	Holford	Bowl barrow	Bronze Age	ST1530838148; 51°08′11″N 3°12′43″W	A Bronze Age bowl barrow which is 22 metres (72 ft) in diameter and 1.7 metres (5 ft 7 in) high. Nearby are two small cairns.	1417361	Upload Photo	
Barrows on Longstone Hill	East Quantoxhead	Bowl barrow	Bronze Age	ST 13505 41345; 51°09′53″N 3°14′18″W	Bowl barrows close to the Greenway Track. One is 19 metres (62 ft) in diameter and the others 6 metres (20 ft) although there is some uncertainty about whether they are natural or man made.	1006157	Upload Photo	
Bat's Castle: a small multivallate hillfort and associated outwork	Carhampton	Hill fort	Iron Age	SS 98820 42146; 51°10′11″N 3°26′55″W	Bat's Castle is an Iron Age hill fort at the top of a 213 metres (699 ft) high hill. It is on the highest point of Gallox Hill. Previously it was known as Caesar's Camp and is possibly associated with Black Ball Camp. Bat's Castle has two stone ramparts and two ditches. The ramparts are damaged in places and the hillfort is partly covered in scrub.	1007667	Bat's Castle: a small multivallate hillfort and associated outwork	
Beckham stone alignment and mound, 450 m south east of the Long Combe sheep pen	Exmoor	Stone row	Late Neolithic to middle Bronze Age	SS 80632 42382; 51°10′06″N 3°42′31″W	Three parallel stone rows consisting of three standing and six recumbent stones.	1014283	Upload Photo	
Bendel's Barrows, Exford Common	Exford	Round barrow	Bronze Age	SS 85388 40940; 51°09′22″N 3°38′25″W	Two Bronze Age bowl barrows, one of 20 metres (66 ft) diameter and the other of 22 metres (72 ft).	1006211	Upload Photo	
Berry Castle, Iron Age enclosure in Berry Castle Wood	Luccombe	Hillfort	Iron Age	SS 85919 44958; 51°11′33″N 3°38′02″W	Berry Castle is an early Roman (possible Iron Age) hillslope enclosure.	1006204	Upload Photo	
Black Ball Camp: a later prehistoric defended settlement on Gallox Hill	Dunster	Hill fort	Iron Age	SS 98428 42651; 51°10′26″N 3°27′15″W	Black Ball Camp is an Iron Age hill fort . It is also known as British Camp and is possibly associated with Bat's Castle. It has a 3 metres (10 ft) high rampart and a 2 metres (7 ft) deep ditch. At the beginning of the 20th century the foundations of a stone tower were visible however this is no longer present.	1007668	Black Ball Camp: a later prehistoric defended settlement on Gallox Hill	
Black Barrow	Exmoor	Round barrow	Bronze Age	SS 83211 44213; 51°11′06″N 3°40′21″W	A round barrow which is 22 metres (72 ft) in diameter and 1.5 metres (4 ft 11 in) high.	1006205	Black Barrow	
Bowl barrow 80 m north of Halsway Post	Holford	Bowl barrow	Late Neolithic to Bronze Age	ST 14012 38612; 51°08′25″N 3°13′50″W	A 7.5-metre (25 ft) diameter bowl barrow.	1015084	Upload Photo	
Bowl barrow 100 m north west of Halsway Post	Holford	Bowl barrow	Late Neolithic to Bronze Age	ST 13962 38618; 51°08′25″N 3°13′52″W	A 8.5-metre (28 ft) diameter bowl barrow.	1015083	Upload Photo	
Bowl barrow 122 m NNW of Halsway Post	Holford	Bowl barrow	Late Neolithic to Bronze Age	ST 13968 38643; 51°08′26″N 3°13′52″W	A bowl barrow which is 5.5 metres (18 ft) in diameter.	1015082	Upload Photo	
Bowl barrow 225 m north west of Halsway Post	Holford	Bowl barrow	Late Neolithic to Bronze Age	ST 13860 38706; 51°08′28″N 3°13′58″W	A 9.5-metre (31 ft) diameter bowl barrow.	1015081	Upload Photo	
Bowl barrow 260 m north east of Ralegh's Cross Hotel	Nettlecombe	Bowl barrow	Late Neolithic to Bronze Age	ST 04142 34544; 51°06′08″N 3°22′13″W	A 41-metre (135 ft) diameter bowl barrow.	1020721	Upload Photo	
Bowl barrow 470 m north of Brendon Hill Farm	Brompton Regis	Bowl barrow	Late Neolithic to Bronze Age	ST 01269 33964; 51°05′47″N 3°24′41″W	A 14-metre (46 ft) diameter bowl barrow.	1020918	Upload Photo	
Bowl barrow 610 m ESE of the fire tower on Monkham Hill	Luxborough	Bowl barrow	Late Neolithic to Bronze Age	SS 99214 39134; 51°08′33″N 3°26′32″W	A 19-metre (62 ft) diameter bowl barrow.	1021227	Upload Photo	
Bowl barrow 650 m north west of Elworthy Barrows hillfort	Elworthy	Bowl barrow	Late Neolithic to Bronze Age	ST 06724 34262; 51°06′00″N 3°20′01″W	A 19.5-metre (64 ft) diameter bowl barrow.	1020725	Upload Photo	
Bowl barrow 700 m north east of Burrow Farm	Brompton Regis	Bowl barrow	Late Neolithic to Bronze Age	ST 01298 34620; 51°06′09″N 3°24′40″W	A 14.5-metre (48 ft) diameter bowl barrow.	1020777	Bowl barrow 700 m north east of Burrow Farm	
Bowl barrow 780 m ESE of the fire tower on Monkham Hill	Luxborough	Bowl barrow	Late Neolithic to Bronze Age	SS 99357 39016; 51°08′29″N 3°26′24″W	A 13.2-metre (43 ft) diameter bowl barrow.	1021231	Upload Photo	
Bowl barrow and round cairn on Withypool Hill, 850 m and 820 m east of Portford Bridge	Withypool and Hawkridge	Bowl barrow and round cairn	Late Neolithic to Bronze Age	SS 83983 34411; 51°05′50″N 3°39′30″W	A bowl barrow and round cairn 50 metres (160 ft) apart on Withypool Hill. The barrow is 20.5 metres (67 ft) and the cairn 3.5 metres (11 ft) in diameter.	1021262	Bowl barrow and round cairn on Withypool Hill, 850 m and 820 m east of Portford Bridge	
Bowl barrow called Chains Barrow	Exmoor	Bowl barrow	Late Neolithic to Bronze Age	SS 73458 41904; 51°09′44″N 3°48′40″W	A 25-metre (82 ft) diameter bowl barrow.	1006206	Upload Photo	
Bowl barrow on Longstone Hill, 270 m NNE of Bicknoller Post	East Quantoxhead	Bowl barrow	Late Neolithic to Bronze Age	ST 13033 40562; 51°09′28″N 3°14′42″W	A 15-metre (49 ft) diameter bowl barrow.	1014131	Upload Photo	
Bowl barrow on Longstone Hill, 270 m north east of Bicknoller Post	East Quantoxhead	Bowl barrow	Late Neolithic to Bronze Age	ST 13100 40485; 51°09′25″N 3°14′38″W	A 11-metre (36 ft) diameter bowl barrow.	1014130	Upload Photo	
Bowl barrow on Lype Hill, 550 m north west of Lype Farm	Cutcombe	Bowl barrow	Late Neolithic to Bronze Age	SS 95035 37112; 51°07′25″N 3°30′04″W	A 21-metre (69 ft) diameter bowl barrow.	1021062	Upload Photo	
Bowl barrow on Lype Hill, 750 m ENE of Heath Pault Cross	Cutcombe	Bowl barrow	Late Neolithic to Bronze Age	SS 94780 37046; 51°07′23″N 3°30′18″W	A 15.8-metre (52 ft) diameter bowl barrow.	1021063	Upload Photo	
Bowl barrow on Thorncombe Hill	Bicknoller	Bowl barrow	Late Neolithic to Bronze Age	ST 13162 39214; 51°08′44″N 3°14′34″W	A bowl barrow which is approximately 12 metres (39 ft) north to south, 10 metres (33 ft) from east to west and is 1 metre (3 ft 3 in) high.	1014129	Upload Photo	
Bowl barrow on Thorncombe Hill, 1.03 km north east of Paradise Farm	Bicknoller	Bowl barrow	Late Neolithic to Bronze Age	ST 13018 39461; 51°08′52″N 3°14′42″W	A 9.3-metre (31 ft) diameter bowl barrow.	1015079	Upload Photo	
Bowl barrow on Thorncombe Hill, 1.07 km north east of Paradise Farm	Bicknoller	Bowl barrow	Late Neolithic to Bronze Age	ST 13030 39495; 51°08′53″N 3°14′41″W	A 7.5-metre (25 ft) diameter bowl barrow.	1015078	Upload Photo	
Bowl barrow on Thorncombe Hill 500 m north west of Halsway Post	East Quantoxhead	Bowl barrow	Late Neolithic to Bronze Age	ST 13668 38892; 51°08′34″N 3°14′08″W	A 16-metre (52 ft) diameter bowl barrow.	1015208	Upload Photo	
Bowl barrow on Thorncombe Hill known as `Thorncombe Barrow'	Bicknoller	Bowl barrow	Late Neolithic to Bronze Age	ST 12733 39418; 51°08′50″N 3°14′56″W	A 17-metre (56 ft) diameter bowl barrow.	1014408	Bowl barrow on Thorncombe Hill known as `Thorncombe Barrow'	
Bowl barrow on Weacombe Hill, 300 m SSW of Bicknoller Post	Bicknoller	Bowl barrow	Bronze Age	ST 12835 40036; 51°09′10″N 3°14′52″W	A bowl barrow which is 13 metres (43 ft) in diameter.	1014125	Upload Photo	
Brewer's Castle	Withypool and Hawkridge	Hillfort	Iron Age	SS 88314 29769; 51°03′23″N 3°35′42″W	Earthworks from a 0.4-hectare (0.99-acre) Iron Age Hillfort surrounded by a bank and ditch.	1021358	Upload Photo	
Brightworthy Barrows on Withypool Common	Withypool	Bowl barrow	Late Neolithic to Bronze Age	SS 81740 35095; 51°06′10″N 3°41′26″W	Two bowl barrows one of which is the site for an Ordnance Survey triangulation station.	1021264	Brightworthy Barrows on Withypool Common	
Burrow Farm iron mine and section of mineral railway trackbed, 350 m north east of Burrow Farm	Brompton Regis	Mine workings	1863	ST 00963 34490; 51°06′04″N 3°24′57″W	The remains of Mine workings from a 19th century Iron ore mine, including the standing beam engine house. The West Somerset Mineral Railway was built to carry the ore from the Brendon Hills to Watchet for export.	1021353	Burrow Farm iron mine and section of mineral railway trackbed, 350 m north east of Burrow Farm	
Bury Bridge	Brompton Regis	Packhorse bridge	Middle Ages	SS 94467 27456; 51°02′12″N 3°30′23″W	A medieval stone bridge with four arches, carrying a small track over the River Haddeo.	1006242	Bury Bridge	
Bury Castle	Brompton Regis	Hillfort	Iron Age reused in Middle Ages	SS 93841 26966; 51°01′56″N 3°30′54″W	Bury Castle is an Iron Age Hillfort and 12th century castle. The hillfort covers 0.2 hectares (0.49 acres) in internal area. The main enclosure has a single rampart and ditch, with steep drops on the north, east and south sides. There is an additional rampart 30 metres (98 ft) to the west, with a deep ditch. The rampart is revetted with drystone walling. In the late 1130s, a civil war, known as the Anarchy, broke out in England between the supporters of King Stephen and the Empress Matilda. A motte and bailey castle was built on the Bury Castle side, probably by William de Say. In 1198 Richard I confirmed that Brompton should be part of the inheritance of Matilda. The motte measures 23 metres (75 ft) and was placed on the southern tip of the promontory, with the bailey beyond around 60 metres (197 ft) across.	1006170	Bury Castle More images	
Bury Castle, an Iron Age defended settlement	Selworthy	Enclosure	Iron Age	SS 91744 47171; 51°12′48″N 3°33′05″W	An enclosure covering 0.21 hectares (0.52 acres) surrounded by a bank and ditch.	1008808	Bury Castle, an Iron Age defended settlement	
Butter Cross at Dunster	Dunster	Wayside Cross	Late 14th or early 15th century	SS9881243873; 51°11′06″N 3°26′57″W	The Butter Cross has an octagonal base and polygonal shaft which probably date from the 15th century. The cross once stood in the High Street, possibly near the Yarn Market, and was moved to its current location on the edge of the village possibly in 1825, however a drawing by J. M. W. Turner made in 1811 suggests it was in its present position by then.	1014409	Butter Cross at Dunster	
Cairn 90 m SSE of the Ordnance Survey triangulation point on Beacon Hill	West Quantoxhead	Cairn	Bronze Age	ST 12493 40909; 51°09′39″N 3°15′10″W	The cairn is around 5.5 metres (18 ft) in diameter and 0.7 metres (2 ft 4 in) high. It is part of a wider cemetery with both cairns and round barrows.	1014123	Upload Photo	
Cairn 150 m SSE of the Ordnance Survey triangulation point on Beacon Hill	West Quantoxhead	Cairn	Bronze Age	ST 12543 40858; 51°09′37″N 3°15′07″W	The cairn is around 0.5 metres (1 ft 8 in) high, 6 metres (20 ft) north to south and 7 metres (23 ft) from east to west. It is part of a wider cemetery with both cairns and round barrows.	1014124	Upload Photo	
Cairn 250 m SSE of the Ordnance Survey triangulation point on Beacon Hill	West Quantoxhead	Cairn	Bronze Age	ST 12575 40764; 51°09′34″N 3°15′06″W	The cairn is around 12 metres (39 ft) in diameter and 0.2 metres (7.9 in) high. It is part of a wider cemetery with both cairns and round barrows.	1014127	Upload Photo	
Cairn 480 m north of Little Quantock Farm	Crowcombe	Cairn	Bronze Age	ST 14915 36972; 51°07′33″N 3°13′02″W	An irregular mound around 26 metres (85 ft) in diameter and 2 metres (6 ft 7 in) high.	1017294	Upload Photo	
Cairn 850 m north east of Dunkery Bridge	Cutcombe	Cairn	Bronze Age	SS 90127 41213; 51°09′35″N 3°34′23″W	The cairn is around 14 metres (46 ft) in diameter and 1.5 metres (4 ft 11 in) high.	1020829	Upload Photo	
Cairn on Bossington Hill, 1.12 km north east of Lynch Mead	Bossington	Cairn	Bronze Age	SS 90839 48625; 51°13′35″N 3°33′54″W	The cairn is around 12 metres (39 ft) in diameter and 10.9 metres (36 ft) high.	1020795	Cairn on Bossington Hill, 1.12 km north east of Lynch Mead	
Cairn on Thorncombe Hill, 990 m north west of Halsway Post	Bicknoller	Cairn	Bronze Age	ST 13212 39105; 51°08′41″N 3°14′32″W	The cairn is around 0.7 metres (2 ft 4 in) high, 11.6 metres (38 ft) north to south and 10.7 metres (35 ft) from east to west.	1015080	Upload Photo	
Cairn on Thorncombe Hill	Bicknoller	Cairn	Bronze Age	ST 12679 39310; 51°08′47″N 3°14′59″W	The cairn is around 0.75 metres (2 ft 6 in) high, 13 metres (43 ft) north to south and 17 metres (56 ft) from east to west.	1014128	Upload Photo	
Caratacus Stone: an inscribed stone 140 m east of Spire Cross	Winsford	inscribed stone	6th century	SS 88970 33557; 51°05′26″N 3°35′12″W	The Caratacus Stone, sometimes known as the Caractacus Stone, is an inscribed stone thought to date from the 6th century. The inscription, in Latin, can be translated as "grandson or immediate descendant of Caratacus", has led to the general opinion that the stone was probably erected as a memorial to a person who claimed the first-century British chieftain Caratacus as an ancestor. The first mention of the stone was in 1219, when it was described in a perambulation of the Royal Forest of Exmoor as "the Langeston". In 1890 the letter N (which is reversed) was missing from the inscription, but by 1919 the missing piece had been found and was cemented back in place. In 1906 a shelter was erected over the stone, and an excavation in 1937 revealed that the stone was not associated with a burial site.	1021228	Caratacus Stone: an inscribed stone 140 m east of Spire Cross More images	
Carnarvon New Pit iron mine and section of mineral railway trackbed, 300 m south west of Heather House	Brompton Regis	Mine workings	1860s	ST 02057 34260; 51°05′57″N 3°24′01″W	The remains of the Carnarvon New Pit iron mine and a section of the West Somerset Mineral Railway which served it. The mine was worked in the 1860s and 1870s before being closed as uneconomic. The ruin of the winding house, main shaft, two airshafts and parts of the railway infrastructure.	1021352	Carnarvon New Pit iron mine and section of mineral railway trackbed, 300 m south west of Heather House	
Chains Valley stone alignment 400 m north west of Exe Head	Exmoor	Stone row	Late Neolithic to middle Bronze Age	SS 74915 41775; 51°09′41″N 3°47′25″W	Ten standing and four recumbent stones which are between 120 millimetres (4.7 in) and 630 millimetres (25 in) high.	1014278	Upload Photo	
Churchyard cross	Bicknoller	Cross	Late 14th century	ST 11106 39428; 51°08′50″N 3°16′20″W	The cross was built in the late 14th century. The tapering octagonal shaft is supported by a three-step base.	1006202	Churchyard cross More images	
Churchyard cross immediately south of Holy Ghost Church	Crowcombe	Cross	Middle Ages	ST 14069 36694; 51°07′23″N 3°13′45″W	The remains of a medieval cross. The octagonal 2.8 metres (9 ft 2 in) high shaft sits on a base of three steps.	1017221	Churchyard cross immediately south of Holy Ghost Church More images	
Cist and associated mound in Langridge Wood, 410 m north west of Treborough Lodge	Withycombe	Cist	Bronze Age	ST 01407 37330; 51°07′36″N 3°24′37″W	A stone built rectangular cist, approximately 2 metres (6 ft 7 in) long which contained a human skeleton until it was removed in 1820.	1020689	Cist and associated mound in Langridge Wood, 410 m north west of Treborough Lodge	
Clatworthy hillfort	Clatworthy	Hillfort	Iron Age	ST 04586 31500; 51°04′28″N 3°22′02″W	Clatworthy Camp is an Iron Age Hillfort. It is situated on a promontory of the Brendon Hills above Clatworthy Reservoir. It is roughly triangular in shape with an area of 5.8 hectares (14 acres). It has a single bank and ditch, cut through solid rock. There may have been an entrance on the west and two on the east.	1006149	Upload Photo	
Cleeve Abbey	Washford	Remains of Cistercian abbey	1198	ST0474440703; 51°09′27″N 3°21′49″W	Cleeve Abbey was a medieval monastery. The abbey was founded in the late twelfth century as a house for monks of the austere Cistercian order. In 1536 Cleeve was closed by Henry VIII in the course of the Dissolution of the Monasteries and the abbey was converted into a country house. Subsequently, the status of the site declined and the abbey was used as farm buildings until the latter half of the nineteenth century when steps were taken to conserve the remains. In the twentieth century Cleeve was taken into state care; the abbey is now looked after by English Heritage and is open to the public. While the church is no longer standing, the conventual buildings are still roofed and habitable and contain many features of particular interest including the 'angel' roof in the refectory and the wall paintings in the painted chamber.	1014824	Cleeve Abbey More images	
Cow Castle	Exmoor	Hillfort	Iron Age	SS 79437 37350; 51°07′22″N 3°43′27″W	Cow Castle is an Iron Age Hillfort which occupies an isolated hilltop and has a single rampart and ditch, enclosing 0.9 hectares (2.2 acres). It is in the valley of the River Barle. It has been added to the heritage at Risk register because of the risk from bracken.	1002955	Cow Castle More images	
Cross 15 m north of St Peter's Church	Williton	Cross	13th century	ST 07522 40772; 51°07′05″N 3°24′54″W	The base and lower part of the shaft of a 13th century stone cross.	1017293	Cross 15 m north of St Peter's Church More images	
Cross in the churchyard of All Saints' Church	Selworthy	Cross	Late 14th century	SS 91995 46793; 51°12′37″N 3°32′51″W	A medieval cross with a 2-metre (6 ft 7 in) stone shaft on an octagonal base with three octagonal steps.	1020775	Cross in the churchyard of All Saints' Church More images	
Cross in the churchyard of St George's Church	Dunster	Cross	Middle Ages	SS 98995 43662; 51°11′00″N 3°26′47″W	The remains of a stone cross which was constructed in or before the 15th century. The remaining part of the shaft is 0.5 millimetres (0.020 in) high and sits on a circular base with three steps.	1021061	Cross in the churchyard of St George's Church	
Cross in the churchyard of the Church of St Mary the Virgin	Luccombe	Cross	15th century	SS 91118 44531; 51°11′22″N 3°33′34″W	A 15th century cross with a 1 metre (3 ft 3 in) stone shaft set in an octagonal three step base.	1020917	Cross in the churchyard of the Church of St Mary the Virgin	
Cross in the churchyard of St Mary the Virgin's Church	Nettlecombe	Cross	Late 14th century	ST 05696 37742; 51°07′52″N 3°20′57″W	The remains of a 14th century cross with a stone shaft set in a two-step base.	1020691	Upload Photo	
Cross in the churchyard of St Peter's Church	Exton	Cross	Late 14th century	SS 92585 33693; 51°05′33″N 3°32′07″W	The remains of a 14th century cross with a tapering octagonal stone shaft. The upper part of the shaft was restored in 1875.	1021156	Upload Photo	
Cross in the churchyard of the Church of St Decuman	Watchet	Cross	14th or 15th century	ST 06493 42684; 51°10′47″N 3°19′49″W	The remains of a 14th or 15th century cross with a tapering octagonal stone shaft on an octagonal base. The upper part of the shaft was restored with wood in the mid 20th century.	1020919	Cross in the churchyard of the Church of St Decuman More images	
Cross in the churchyard of St Mary's Church	Luxborough	Cross	13th or 14th century	SS 97385 38005; 51°07′56″N 3°28′04″W	A medieval inscribed stone cross which is 1.6 metres (5 ft 3 in) high and stands on a partially buried plinth.	1021155	Upload Photo	
Cross in the churchyard of St Peter's Church	Treborough	Cross	Late 13th century	ST 01067 36365; 51°07′05″N 3°24′54″W	A medieval cross with a stone shaft on an octagonal base with three octagonal steps. The head of the cross with a figure of St Peter is a 19th century addition.	1020690	Cross in the churchyard of St Peter's Church	
Crowcombe village cross 170 m north west of Holy Ghost Church	Crowcombe	Cross	Middle Ages	ST 13906 36765; 51°07′25″N 3°13′54″W	A medieval cross of red sandstone. The octagonal shaft is 3 metres (9.8 ft) high, topped by a Greek cross added in the 19th century, standing on an octagonal base.	1017220	Crowcombe village cross 170 m north west of Holy Ghost Church	
Curdon Wood camp	Stogumber	Hillfort	Iron Age	ST 10201 38515; 51°08′05″N 3°17′28″W	Curdon Camp is a univallate Iron Age hillfort. It was nearly completely destroyed by quarrying and bulldozing. A section of the camp remains that is still 2.5 metres (8 ft 2 in) high on the southern and western sides.	1006158	Upload Photo	
Daw's Castle	Watchet	Hillfort	Iron Age	ST 06141 43181; 51°10′53″N 3°20′39″W	Daw's Castle is a sea cliff Hillfort just west of Watchet. The fort is situated on an east-west cliff about 80 metres (260 ft) above the sea, on a tapering spur of land bounded by the Washford River. The ramparts of the fort would have formed a semicircle backing on to the sheer cliffs, but coastal erosion has reduced the size of the enclosure, and later destruction by farming, limekilns, and the B3191 road, have left only about 300 metres (980 ft) of ramparts visible today. The fort may be of Iron Age origin, but was (re)built and fortified as a burh by King Alfred, as part of his defence against Viking raids from the Bristol Channel around 878 AD. It would have been one of a chain of forts and coastal lookout posts, connected by the Herepath, or military road, which allowed Alfred to move his army along the coast, covering Viking movements at sea.	1020882	Daw's Castle	
Deserted medieval farm, W of Bramble Combe	Minehead Without	Earthworks	Middle Ages	SS 94045 47920; 51°13′14″N 3°31′07″W	Earthworks of a medieval farmhouse 22 metres (72 ft) by 5 metres (16 ft). It is known to have been occupied around 1279 and in decline by 1487.	1006126	Upload Photo	
Dovecote 60 m north of St George's Church	Dunster	Dovecote	Late 16th century	SS9901843725; 51°11′02″N 3°26′46″W	Dunster Dovecote was probably built in the late 16th century. It is situated on Priory Green opposite the Tithe Barn and close to the walls of the Priory Church of St George. It is approximately 5.8 metres (19 ft) high and 5.8 metres (19 ft) in diameter, with walls around 1.2 metres (4 ft) thick. There are five hundred and forty nest-holes. In the 18th century the floor level and door were raised among several major alterations. The lower tiers of nest holes were blocked to protect against Brown Rats which had arrived in the Britain in 1720 and reached Somerset by 1760. A revolving ladder, known as a "potence", was installed to allow the pigeon keeper to search the nest holes more easily. In the 19th century two feeding platforms were added to the axis of the revolving ladder.	1020408	Dovecote 60 m north of St George's Church More images	
Dovecote at Little Blackford	Selworthy	Dovecote	11th century	SS 92475 45284; 51°11′48″N 3°32′25″W	The Dovecot At Blackford Farm was built in the 11th century. It is now owned by the National Trust and used as a store for the neighbouring farm. The earliest written record of the Dovecote was in 1393 although the exact date of construction is not known. It is built of local Devonian sandstone, with walls are 1.2 metres (4 ft) thick and contains over 300 nest holes.	1020774	Dovecote at Little Blackford	
Doverhay Down round barrow, Porlock	Luccombe	Round barrow	Bronze Age	SS 88566 45241; 51°11′44″N 3°35′46″W	Two round barrows one of which is 9.6 metres (31 ft) in diameter and the other 6.4 metres (21 ft).	1006191	Upload Photo	
Dowsborough hillfort and associated round barrow	Holford	Hillfort	Iron Age	ST 16017 39113; 51°08′43″N 3°12′05″W	Dowsborough Camp (or Danesborough or Dawesbury) is an Iron Age Hillfort on the Quantock Hills near Nether Stowey. The fort has an oval shape, with a single rampart and ditch (univallate) following the contours of the hill top, enclosing an area of 2.7 hectares (6.7 acres). The fort and associated round barrow has been added to the Heritage at Risk Register due to vulnerability to vehicle damage and erosion.	1010494	Upload Photo	
Dunkery Beacon and adjacent mounds	Cutcombe	Burial mounds	Bronze Age	SS 89143 41590; 51°09′46″N 3°35′12″W	Dunkery Beacon is the summit of Dunkery Hill, and the highest point on Exmoor and in Somerset. Dunkery Beacon was given to the National Trust in 1935 by Sir Thomas Acland, Colonel Wiggin and Allan Hughes along with the rest of the Holnicote Estate an event commemorated by the summit memorial cairn known as Robin How.	1003026	Dunkery Beacon and adjacent mounds More images	
Early Christian to medieval settlement and cemetery	Carhampton	Earthworks	Early Middle Ages	ST 01108 42677; 51°10′29″N 3°24′58″W	Earthworks remains of houses and a metal working site dating from the 5th to 8th century. Skeletons from a medieval cemetery have also been recovered from the site.	1013589	Upload Photo	
Earthwork enclosure on Rodhuish Common, 300 m west of Moor Barn	Withycombe	Hillfort	Iron Age	SS 99901 39225; 51°08′37″N 3°25′56″W	Rodhuish Common is a univallate Iron Age Hillfort. There is a small oval enclosure which is thought to be of Iron Age date.	1021122	Upload Photo	
Earthwork enclosure on Monkslade Common, 860 m east of Fire Tower	Luxborough	Earthworks	Iron Age	SS 99468 39174; 51°08′35″N 3°26′19″W	Earthworks from an Iron Age enclosure 68 metres (223 ft) long and 54 metres (177 ft) wide surrounded by a bank and ditch.	1021121	Upload Photo	
Earthwork enclosure on Winsford Hill, 200 m south east of Wambarrows	Winsford	Earthworks	Late Middle Ages	SS 87789 34204; 51°05′46″N 3°36′14″W	Earthworks from a medieval enclosure 17.6 metres (58 ft) long and 13.2 metres (43 ft) wide.	1021274	Upload Photo	
Earthworks W of Bury	Brompton Regis	Earthworks	Unknown	SS9434027296; 51°02′07″N 3°30′30″W	Earthworks from an enclosure of unknown date with banks on either side; however it is unlikely this was a defensive structure.	1003031	Upload Photo	
East Pinford: a stone alignment on the west side of East Pinford 700 m west of Long Combe sheep pen	Exmoor	Stone row	Late Neolithic to middle Bronze Age	SS 79658 42730; 51°10′16″N 3°43′22″W	An alignment of two parallel rows of six standing stones. The stones are between 350 millimetres (14 in) and 720 millimetres (28 in) high.	1014263	Upload Photo	
Edgerley Stone	Exmoor	Inscribed stone	Before 1207	SS 71959 40700; 51°09′04″N 3°49′56″W	A wedge shaped stone which is 1.5 metres (4 ft 11 in) high. The inscribed text is of unknown date.	1020883	Upload Photo	
Elworthy Barrows hillfort	Brompton Ralph	Hill fort	Iron Age	ST 07033 33718; 51°05′44″N 3°19′43″W	Elworthy Barrows is an unfinished Iron Age hill fort rather than Bronze Age barrows. It covers an area of 3.5 hectares (8.6 acres) and is surrounded by a bank and ditch.	1020724	Upload Photo	
Enclosure and associated outworks on Staddon Hill	Winsford	Enclosure	Iron Age	SS 88143 37524; 51°07′34″N 3°35′59″W	Staddon Hill Camp is an hill slope enclosure. It covers 0.1 hectares (0.25 acres) and is surrounded by a bank and ditch.	1021359	Upload Photo	
Entrenchment on Heydon Hill	Huish Champflower	Earthworks	Unknown	ST 03391 28215; 51°02′42″N 3°22′46″W	A bank and ditch. The site has been added to the Heritage at Risk Register because of the risks of arable ploughing.	1006173	Upload Photo	
Exe Plain stone alignment 425 m north east of the sheepfold	Exmoor	Stone row	Late Neolithic to middle Bronze Age	SS 74970 42629; 51°10′09″N 3°47′23″W	A 27.8-metre (91 ft) long stone row of two vertical and one recumbent stones.	1014262	Upload Photo	
Four cairns on Hurley Beacon	Crowcombe	Cairn	Bronze Age	ST 14112 37999; 51°08′05″N 3°13′44″W	The central cairn at the highest point is known as Hurley Beacon and is 24 metres (79 ft) in diameter and 2 metres (6 ft 7 in) high.	1017218	Upload Photo	
Four medieval fish weirs 500 m east of the Harbour	Minehead	Fishing weir	Middle Ages	SS 97644 47052; 51°12′49″N 3°28′00″W	A series of V-shaped stone fish weirs. The date on which they were built is not documented; however, there is documentary evidence of the weirs in 1420, but they may date back to the 11th century.	1020017	Upload Photo	
Four round barrows on The Allotment, 520 m south east of Spire Cross	Winsford	Round barrow	Neolithic to Bronze Age	SS 89284 33287; 51°05′18″N 3°34′56″W	Four round barrows each between 5 metres (16 ft) and 12.5 metres (41 ft) in diameter.	1021230	Upload Photo	
Four round cairns on Dunkery Hill 400 m south east of Joaney How Cairn	Wootton Courtenay	Cairn	Bronze Age	SS 91052 42642; 51°10′21″N 3°33′35″W	Two pairs of cairns ranging from 7.4 metres (24 ft) to 18 metres (59 ft) in diameter.	1020931	Upload Photo	
Gallox Bridge	Dunster	Bridge	15th century	SS9895143213; 51°10′45″N 3°26′49″W	The Gallox Bridge is a narrow stone packhorse bridge, on the southern outskirts of Dunster, with two arches over the River Avill. It has a roadway width of 1.2 metres (3.9 ft), a total width of 1.9 metres (6.2 ft) and is 13.5 metres (44.3 ft) long. The bridge is in the guardianship of English Heritage.	1014410	Gallox Bridge More images	
Green Barrow on Hawkridge Common	Withypool and Hawkridge	Bowl barrow	Neolithic to Bronze Age	SS 81791 34564; 51°05′54″N 3°41′23″W	A 13.3-metre (44 ft) diameter bowl barrow.	1021263	Upload Photo	
Group of four barrows and cairns known as 'Rowbarrows' including Great Rowbarrow and Little Rowbarrow	Cutcombe	Cairns and barrows	Bronze Age	SS 87417 41473; 51°09′41″N 3°36′41″W	A cairn which is 25 metres (82 ft) diameter and associated barrows.	1003677	Group of four barrows and cairns known as 'Rowbarrows' including Great Rowbarrow and Little Rowbarrow	
Group of round barrows	North Molton	Round barrow	Bronze Age	SS 74635 36212; 51°06′41″N 3°47′32″W	A group of ten Round barrows	1002626	Group of round barrows	

== See also ==
- Scheduled monuments in West Somerset – overview of scheduled monuments
- Scheduled monuments in West Somerset (H–Z) – list of scheduled monuments
- Scheduled monuments in Taunton Deane – overview and list of scheduled monuments
