= Clatworthy =

Village and civil parish in Somerset, England

Coordinates: 51.0697°N 3.3532°W

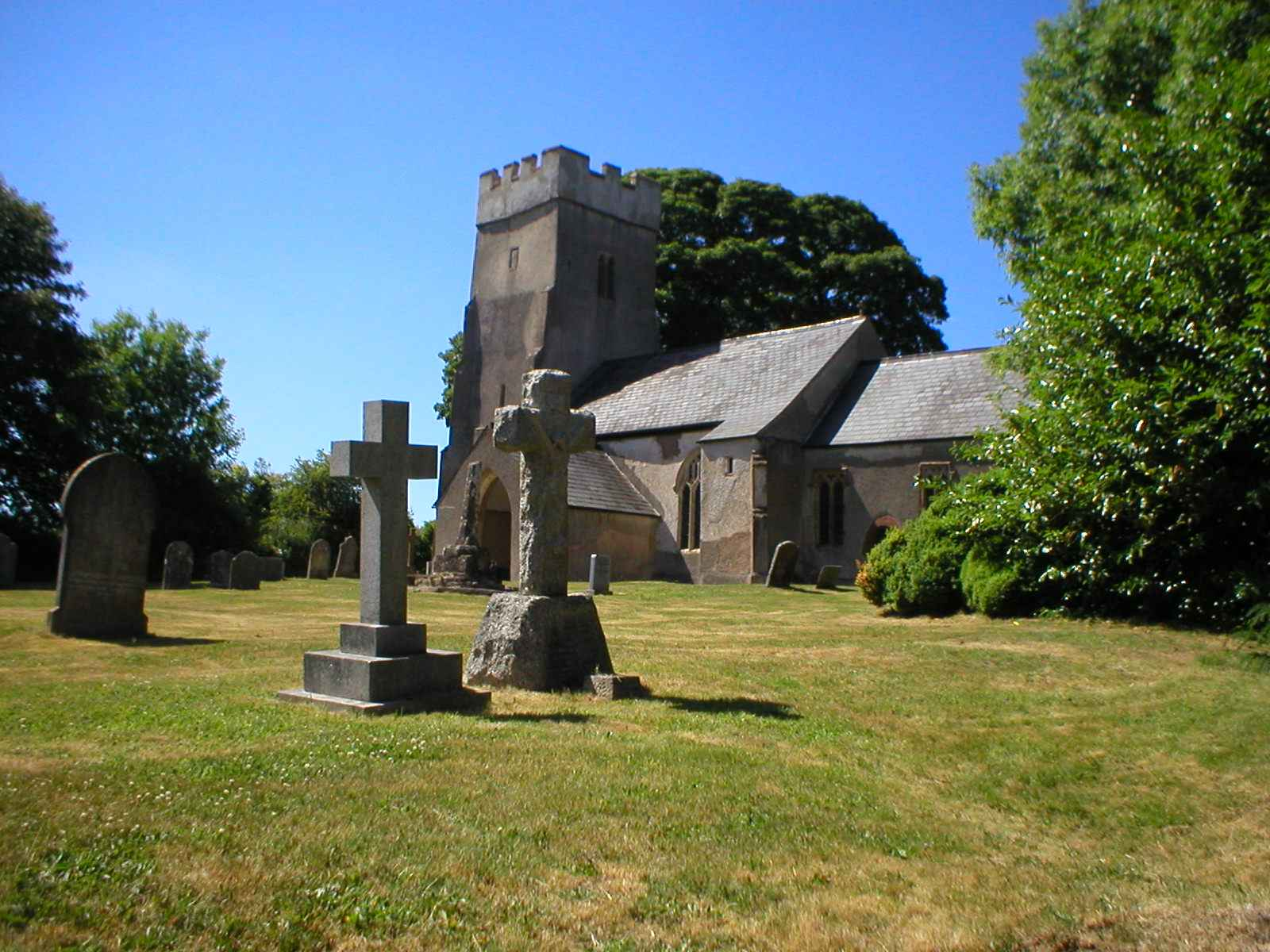
- Church of St Mary Magdalene

- Location within Somerset
- Population: 101 (2001)
- OS grid reference: ST052309
- Unitary authority: Somerset Council
- Ceremonial county: Somerset
- Region: South West
- Country: England
- Sovereign state: United Kingdom
- Post town: TAUNTON
- Postcode district: TA4
- Dialling code: 01984
- Police: Avon and Somerset
- Fire: Devon and Somerset
- Ambulance: South Western
- UK Parliament: Tiverton and Minehead

Clatworthy is a village and civil parish in Somerset, England. It is situated 10 miles (16 km) from Wellington and four miles (6 km) from Wiveliscombe on the southern slopes of the Brendon Hills and close to the Exmoor National Park.

The Clatworthy Reservoir is run by Wessex Water and has a capacity of 5,364,000 cubic metres, supplying some 200,000 homes. It impounds the head waters of the River Tone and the surrounding area is used for walking and fishing.

== History ==
The name of the village means the "homestead where burdock grows". The name appears in the Domesday Book, 1086, and is the Norman version of the original Anglo Saxon name which was Clota's Wertig [farm]. The Normans changed the name to clateurde which became clatworthy and in some instances Clotworthy.

The parish of Clatworthy was part of the Williton and Freemanners Hundred.

Just west of the village, at the edge of Exmoor National Park, is the Clatworthy Reservoir, which impounds the headwaters of River Tone and supplies water to some 200,000 homes and businesses, some as far away as Yeovil. An Iron Age enclosure known as Clatworthy Castle was sited on the wooded slopes above the reservoir and there are round barrows in the north of the parish.

== Governance ==
The parish council has responsibility for local issues, including setting an annual precept (local rate) to cover the council's operating costs and producing annual accounts for public scrutiny. The parish council evaluates local planning applications and works with the local police, district council officers, and neighbourhood watch groups on matters of crime, security, and traffic. The parish council's role also includes initiating projects for the maintenance and repair of parish facilities, as well as consulting with the district council on the maintenance, repair, and improvement of highways, drainage, footpaths, public transport, and street cleaning. Conservation matters (including trees and listed buildings) and environmental issues are also the responsibility of the council.

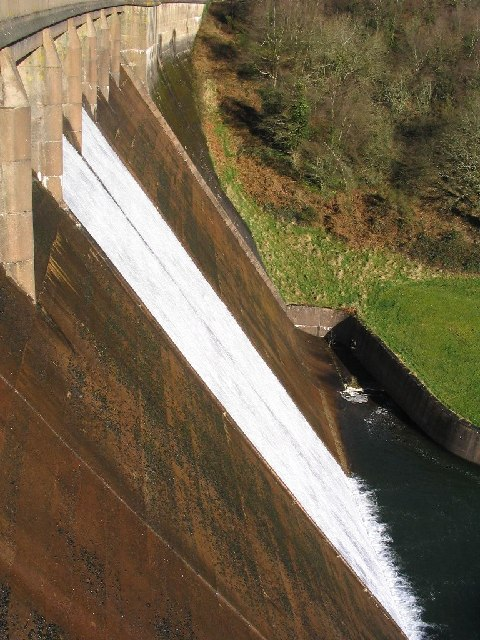
The Dam at Clatworthy Reservoir

For local government purposes, since 1 April 2023, the parish comes under the unitary authority of Somerset Council. Prior to this, it was part of the non-metropolitan district of Somerset West and Taunton (formed on 1 April 2019) and, before this, the district of West Somerset (established under the Local Government Act 1972). It was part of Williton Rural District before 1974.

It is also part of the Tiverton and Minehead represented in the House of Commons of the Parliament of the United Kingdom. It elects one Member of Parliament (MP) by the first past the post system of election.

== Religious sites ==
The parish Church of St Mary Magdalene has a 12th-century tower. The nave was rebuilt in 1872, while the chancel was rebuilt and the tower altered between 1860 and 1883.
