= Black Dog, Devon =

Village in Devon, England

Coordinates: 50.8750°N 3.6987°W

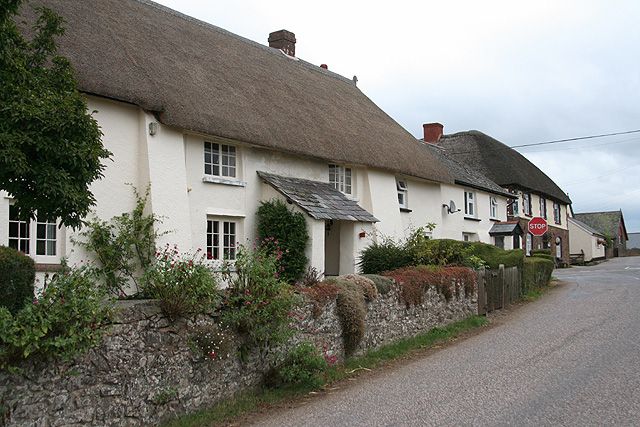
A street of thatched houses in Black Dog

Black Dog is a village in Mid Devon, ten miles west of Tiverton and six miles north of Crediton.

The village is on one of the highest ridges of land between Dartmoor and Exmoor, at an altitude of 656 feet. It enjoys views to both moors, but particularly of Dartmoor from the pub, now closed, the Black Dog Inn, which was a favoured watering hole for walkers on the 'Two Moors Way'. Black Dog is split between the civil parishes of Washford Pyne and Woolfardisworthy.

The Iron Age hill fort Berry Castle, Black Dog is to the south (not to be confused with the other Berry Castles within Devon).
