= Bury Castle =

Bury Castle may refer to the following places in England:

- Bury Castle, Brompton Regis, Somerset
- Bury Castle, Greater Manchester
- Bury Castle, Selworthy, Somerset

== See also ==
- Berry Castle (disambiguation)
- Bury (disambiguation)
