= Berry Castle =

Berry Castle may refer to the following places in England:

- Berry Castle, Black Dog, an Iron Age earthwork near Black Dog, Devon
- Berry Castle, Somerset
- Berry Castle, Huntshaw, an Iron Age hill fort near Weare Giffard, Devon
- Berry Pomeroy Castle, a Tudor mansion, Devon

== See also ==
- Bury Castle (disambiguation)
