= Scheduled monuments in Somerset West and Taunton =

Protected historic sites in Somerset, England

Somerset West and Taunton is a local government district in Somerset, England. It was established on 1 April 2019 by the Somerset West and Taunton (Local Government Changes) Order 2018. The council replaced the Taunton Deane and West Somerset councils, which governed the same area from 1974.

A scheduled monument is a nationally important archaeological site or monument which is given legal protection by being placed on a list (or "schedule") by the Secretary of State for Culture, Media and Sport; English Heritage takes the leading role in identifying such sites. The legislation governing this is the Ancient Monuments and Archaeological Areas Act 1979. The term "monument" can apply to the whole range of archaeological sites, and they are not always visible above ground. Such sites have to have been deliberately constructed by human activity. They range from prehistoric standing stones and burial sites, through Roman remains and medieval structures such as castles and monasteries, to later structures such as industrial sites and buildings constructed for the World Wars or the Cold War.

== Monuments ==
- List of scheduled monuments in West Somerset (A–G) – scheduled monuments in the former West Somerset whose names begin with A-G
- List of scheduled monuments in West Somerset (H–Z) – scheduled monuments in the former West Somerset whose names begin with H-Z
- List of scheduled monuments in Taunton Deane – scheduled monuments in the former Taunton Deane

== See also ==
- Grade I listed buildings in West Somerset
- Grade II* listed buildings in West Somerset
- Grade I listed buildings in Taunton Deane
- Grade II* listed buildings in Taunton Deane
- Scheduled monuments in Somerset
