= Church of St Mary Magdalene, Clatworthy =

Church in Somerset, England

Church of Mary Magdalene
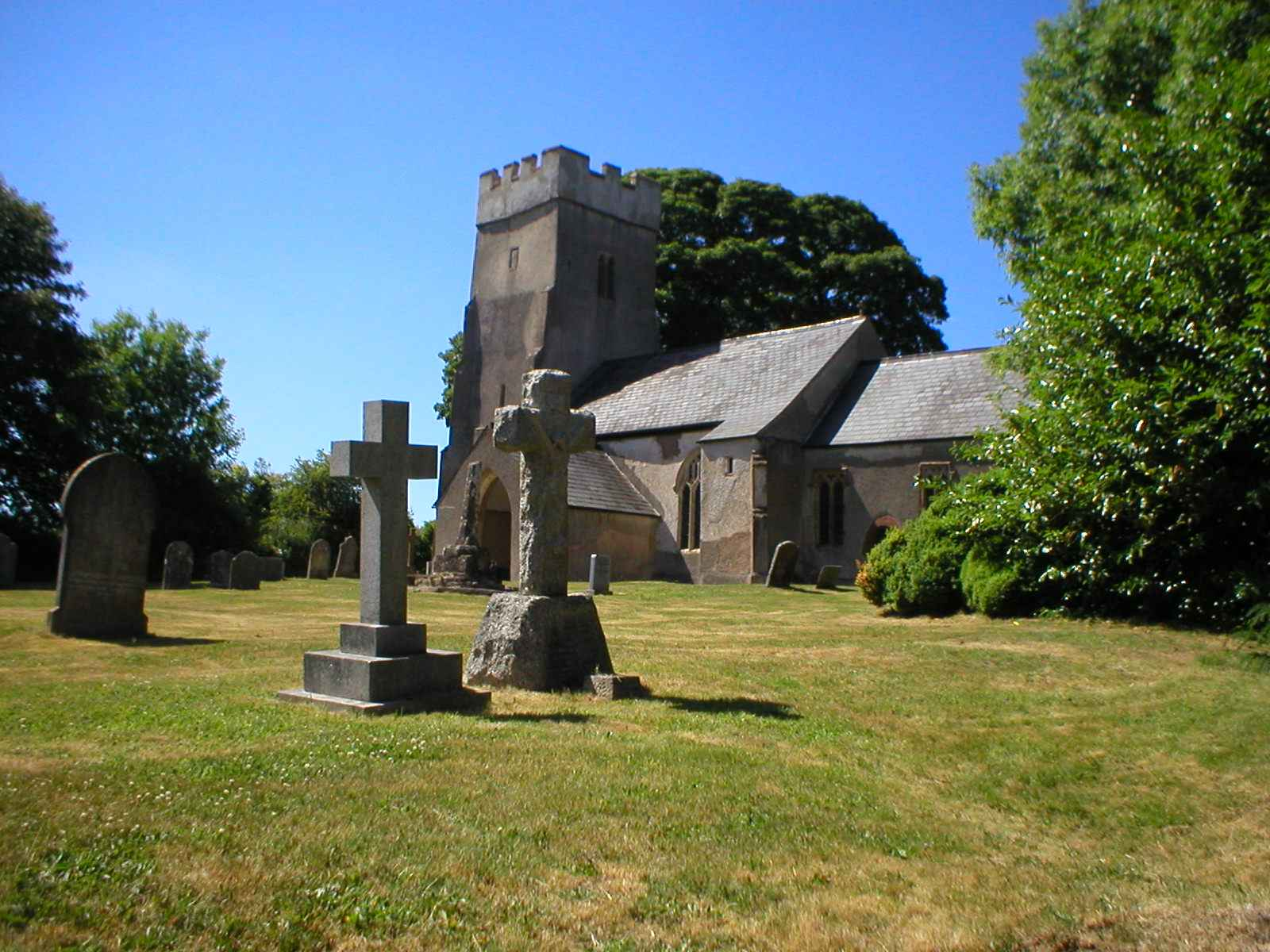

- Location within Somerset
- 51.0699°N 3.3535°W
- Location: Clatworthy, Somerset, England

History
- Built: 12th century

Listed Building – Grade II*
- Official name: Church of Mary Magdalene
- Designated: 22 May 1969
- Reference no.: 1263926

The Anglican Church of Mary Magdalene in Clatworthy, Somerset, England was built in the 12th century. It is a Grade II* listed building.

== History ==
The tower of the church survives from the 12th century, however the nave was lengthened and the tower added in the Middle Ages. The nave and chancel were rebuilt as part of a Victorian restoration in the 1860s and 1870s.

The parish is part of the Wiveliscombe and the Hills benefice within the Diocese of Bath and Wells.

== Architecture ==
The stone building has Bath stone dressings and a slate roof. It consists of a two-bay nave and north aisle, a chancel and a north east vestry. The two-stage tower has buttresses to the east front.

The fittings including the pulpit and pews were installed in the first half of the 19th century.

== See also ==
- List of ecclesiastical parishes in the Diocese of Bath and Wells
