= Brompton Regis =

Village and civil parish in Somerset, England

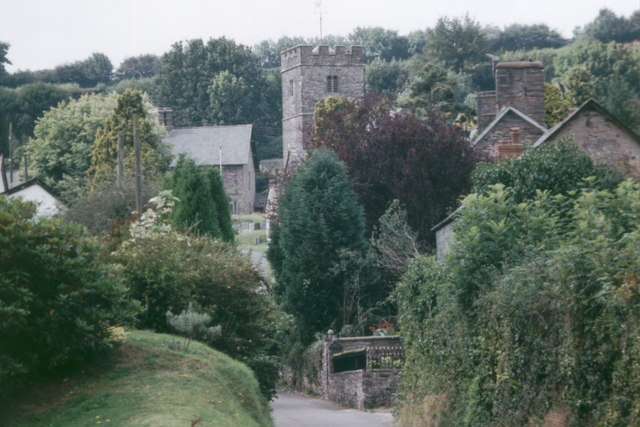
- Brompton Regis

- Location within Somerset
- Population: 449 (2011)
- OS grid reference: SS955315
- Unitary authority: Somerset Council
- Ceremonial county: Somerset
- Region: South West
- Country: England
- Sovereign state: United Kingdom
- Post town: DULVERTON
- Postcode district: TA22
- Dialling code: 01398
- Police: Avon and Somerset
- Fire: Devon and Somerset
- Ambulance: South Western
- UK Parliament: Tiverton and Minehead

Brompton Regis (formerly known as Kingsbrompton) is a village and civil parish in Somerset, England about 5 miles (8.0 km) north-east of Dulverton. It is situated on the River Pulham in the Brendon Hills within the Exmoor National Park, close to Wimbleball Lake, a water supply reservoir constructed in the 1970s and completed in 1979. According to the 2011 census the village had a population of 449. The parish boundary is marked by the River Exe which is crossed by the medieval Chilly Bridge and Hele Bridge. The Haddeo is crossed by Bury Bridge.

The parish includes the village of Withiel Florey, where the Church of St Mary Magdalene has 12th-century origins and has been designated as a Grade II* listed building, and the hamlets of Bury, Gupworthy and Hartford.

== History ==
Before the Norman Conquest the manor was held by Gytha Thorkelsdóttir and was seized by William the Conqueror. The parish of Withiel Florey was part of the Taunton Deane Hundred, while Brompton Regis was part of the Williton and Freemanners Hundred. By the later 12th century Brompton Regis had been granted to William de Say, who founded Barlynch Priory in the west of the parish. In the 13th century it passed to the Besil family who had a Motte and Bailey castle near Bury, known as Bury Castle.

Gupworthy was the terminus of the West Somerset Mineral Railway which ran from the ironstone mines in the Brendon Hills to the port of Watchet on the Bristol Channel.

Bury Bridge over the River Haddeo is a medieval packhorse bridge. It has been scheduled as an ancient monument and Grade II* listed building.

== Governance ==
The parish council has responsibility for local issues, including setting an annual precept (local rate) to cover the council's operating costs and producing annual accounts for public scrutiny. The parish council evaluates local planning applications and works with the local police, district council officers, and neighbourhood watch groups on matters of crime, security, and traffic. The parish council's role also includes initiating projects for the maintenance and repair of parish facilities, as well as consulting with the district council on the maintenance, repair, and improvement of highways, drainage, footpaths, public transport, and street cleaning. Conservation matters (including trees and listed buildings) and environmental issues are also the responsibility of the council.

For local government purposes, since 1 April 2023, the parish comes under the unitary authority of Somerset Council. Prior to this, it was part of the non-metropolitan district of Somerset West and Taunton (formed on 1 April 2019) and, before this, the district of West Somerset (established under the Local Government Act 1972). It was part of Dulverton Rural District before 1974.

There is an electoral ward called 'Brendon Hills'. This stretches from Brompton Regis eastwards to Brompton Ralph. The total population of this ward at the 2011 census was 1,287.

As Brompton Regis falls within the Exmoor National Park some functions normally administered by district or county councils have, since 1997, fallen under the Exmoor National Park Authority, which is known as a 'single purpose' authority, which aims to "conserve and enhance the natural beauty, wildlife and cultural heritage of the National Parks" and "promote opportunities for the understanding and enjoyment of the special qualities of the Parks by the public", including responsibility for the conservation of the historic environment.

It is also part of the Tiverton and Minehead county constituency represented in the House of Commons of the Parliament of the United Kingdom. It elects one member of parliament (MP) by the first past the post system of election.

== Religious sites ==
The parish Church of St Mary in Brompton Regis has a 13th-century tower, with the rest of the church being from around 1490.

The Church of St Mary Magdalene in Withiel Florey was built in the 12th century. It is a Grade II* listed building.

== See also ==
- Regis (Place)
- List of place names with royal patronage in the United Kingdom

== Gallery ==
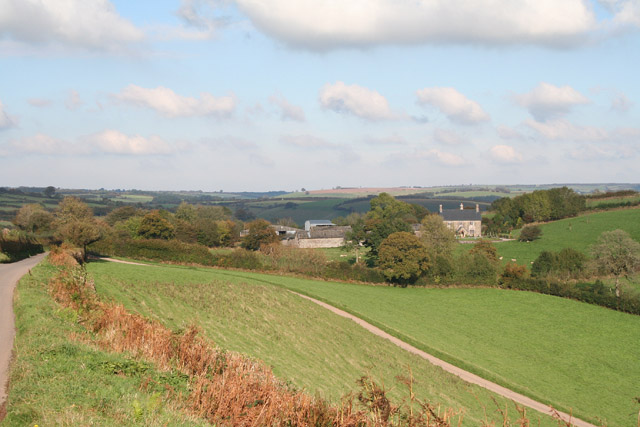
Brompton Regis: Redcross Farm

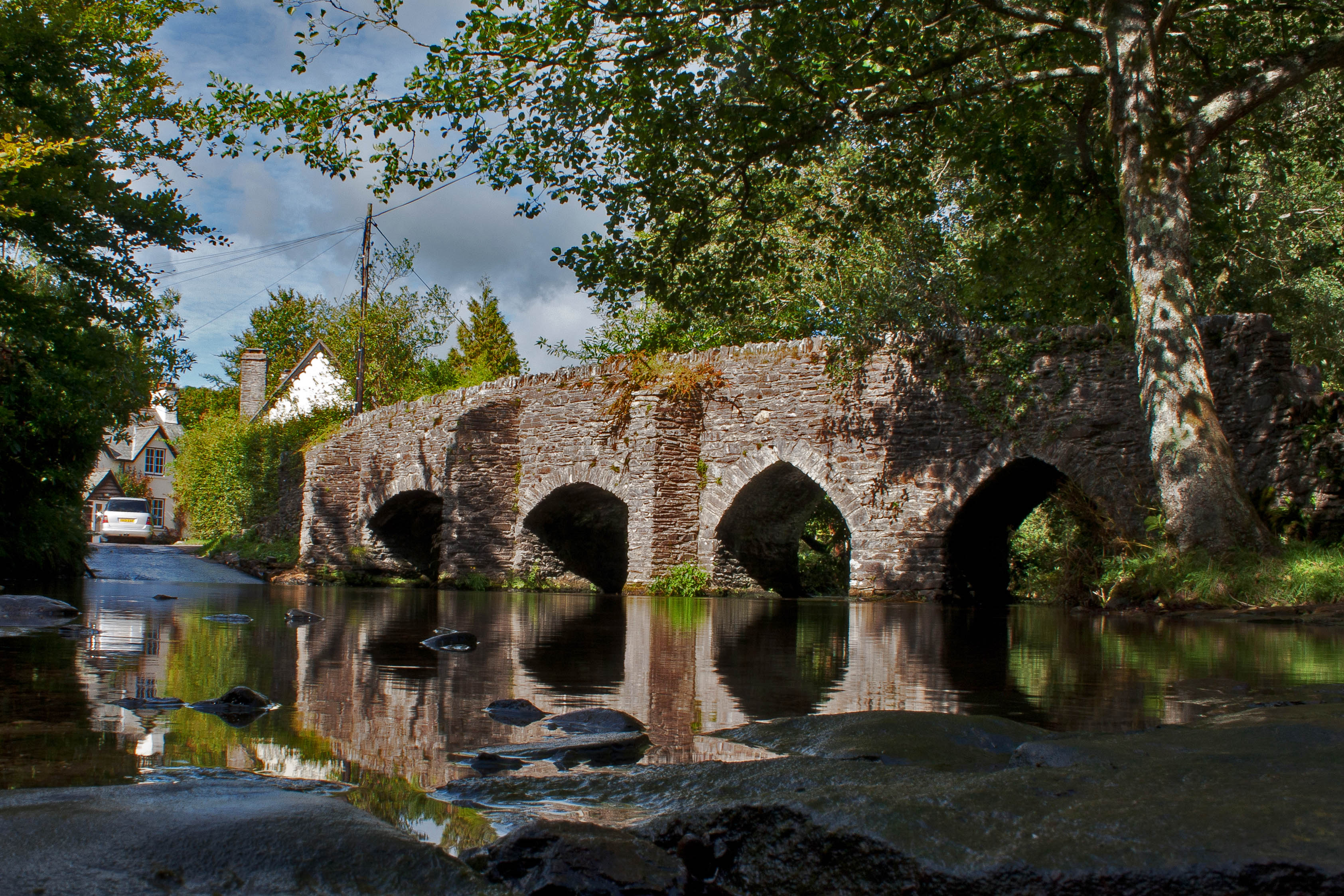
The Ancient bridge and ford at Bury 51°2′12.28″N 3°30′23.65″W

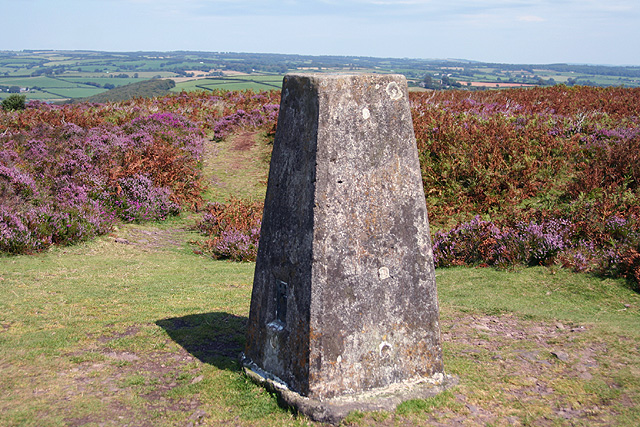
Hadborough trig point.
