= Woolfardisworthy, Mid Devon =

Village and civil parish in Mid Devon, Devon, England

Coordinates: 50°51′54″N 3°40′0″W

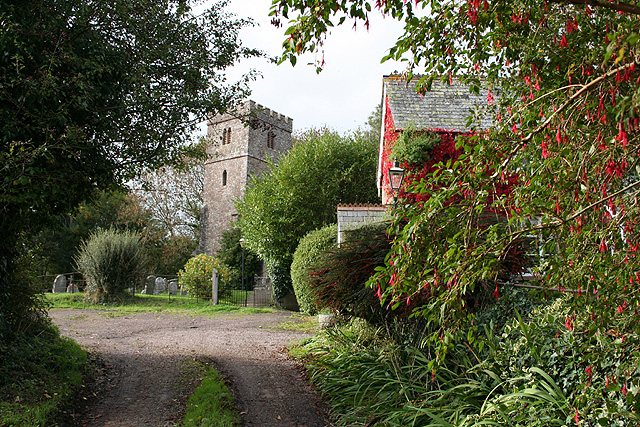
St Mary's Church, Woolfardisworthy

Woolfardisworthy (/wʊlˈfɑːrdɪswɜːrði/ wuul-FAR-diss-wur-dhee) is a village and civil parish in Mid Devon, situated about 5 miles (9 km) north of Crediton. The name derives from Old English and means "Wulfheard's enclosure". The civil parish also contains the village of Black Dog.
