= Bury Bridge =

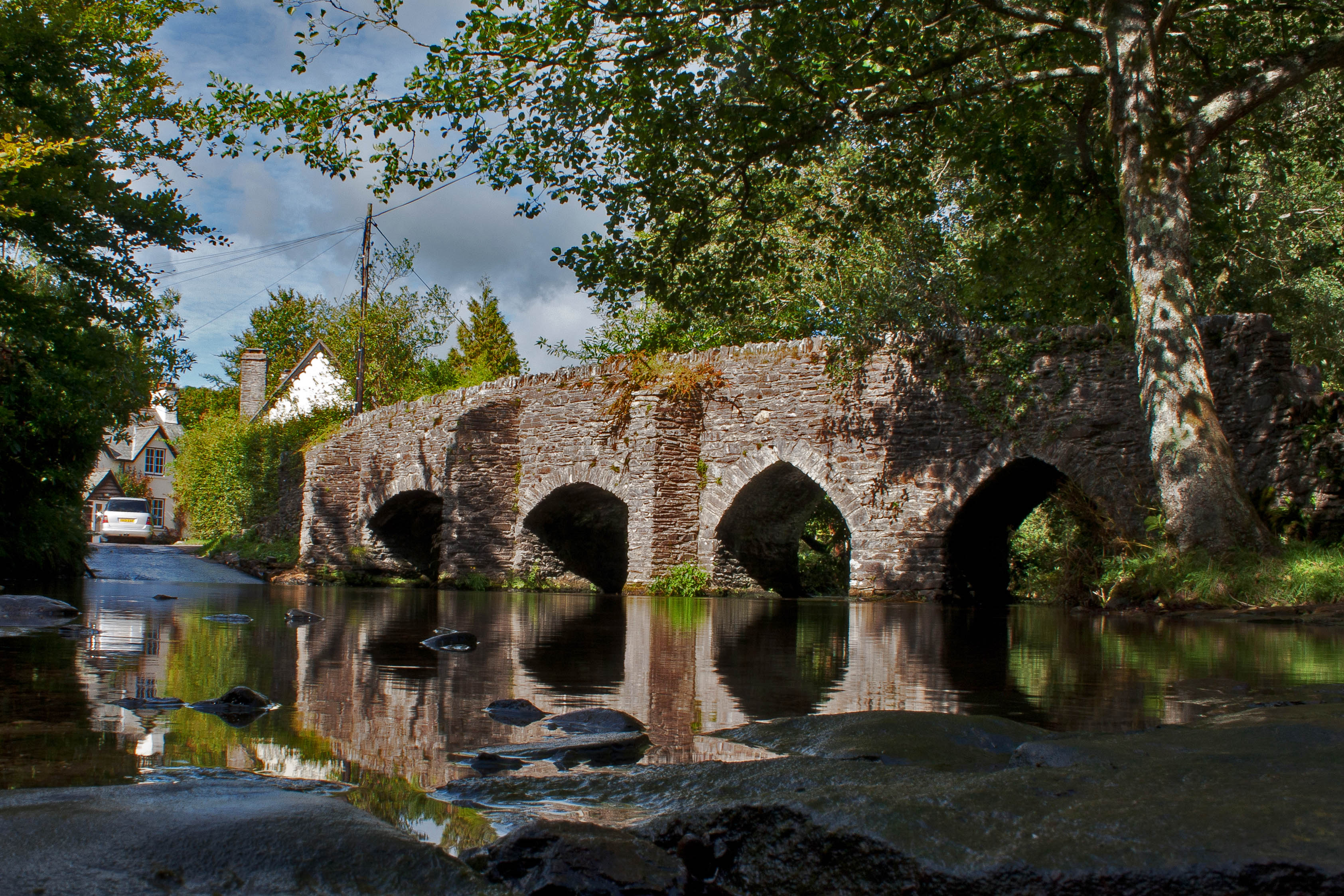
- Coordinates: 51.0367°N 3.5066°W
- Carries: Road
- Crosses: River Haddeo
- Heritage status: Ancient monument and Grade II* listed building

Characteristics
- Design: Arch bridge
- Total length: 63 feet (19 m)
- Width: 6 feet 10 inches (2.08 m)
- No. of spans: 4

History
- Construction end: Middle Ages

Bury Bridge at Bury in the parish of Brompton Regis within the English county of Somerset is a medieval packhorse bridge. It has been scheduled as an ancient monument and Grade II* listed building.

The stone bridge carries a track over the River Haddeo. It consists of four spans, two of which are 7 feet (2.1 m), one 8 feet (2.4 m) and the other 10 feet (3.0 m). Two of the arches are pointed and the other two semi-circular. It has a total span of 48 feet (15 m) and is 6 feet 6 inches (1.98 m) wide.
