= Clatworthy Reservoir =

Reservoir in Somerset, England

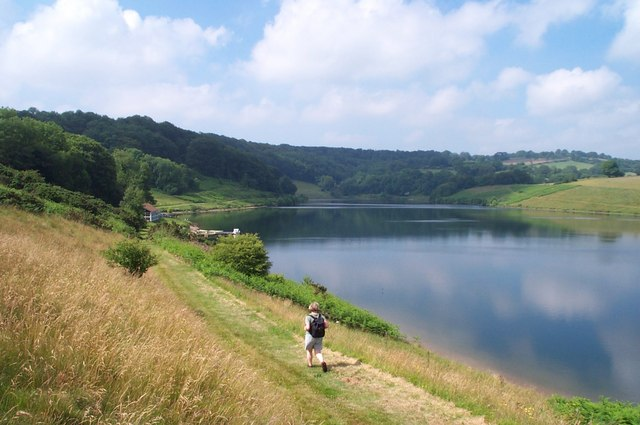

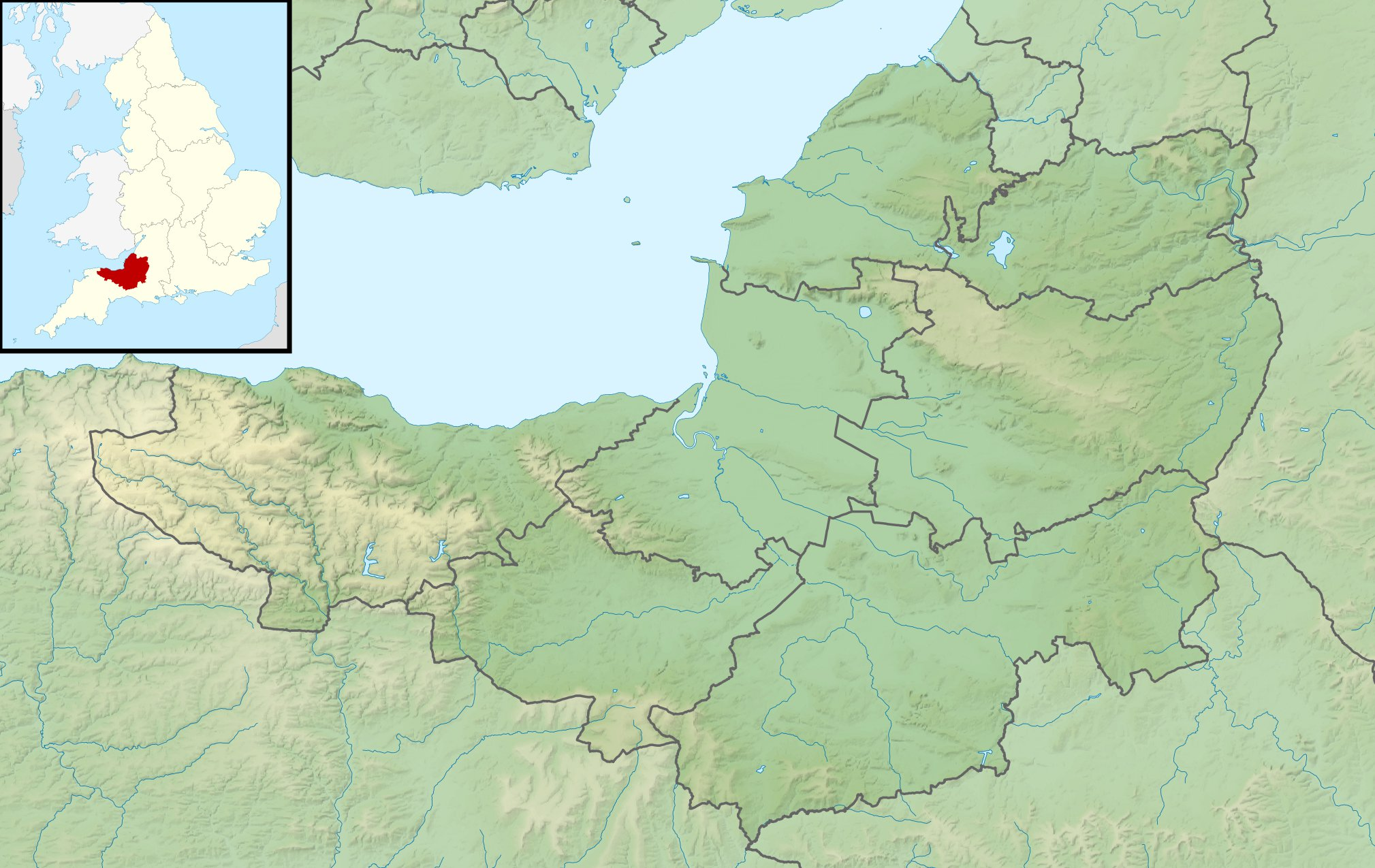
- Location within Somerset
- Location: Somerset
- Coordinates: 51°04′23″N 3°22′9″W
- Type: reservoir
- Primary inflows: River Tone
- Basin countries: United Kingdom
- Water volume: 5,364,000 cubic metres (1.180×10^{9} imp gal)

Clatworthy Reservoir is situated near Clatworthy in the Brendon Hills on the edge of the Exmoor National Park in west Somerset, England. It is run by Wessex Water and has a capacity of 5,364,000 cubic metres (1.180×10^{9} imp gal), supplying some 200,000 homes. It impounds the head waters of the River Tone and the surrounding area is used for walking and fishing.

Clatworthy Camp, an Iron Age hill fort is situated on a promontory above Clatworthy Reservoir. It is roughly triangular in shape with an area of 5.8 hectares. It has a single bank and ditch, cut through solid rock. There may have been an entrance on the west and two on the east. The ancient settlement of Syndercombe was flooded on the creation of the reservoir. In the Domesday Book of 1086 the manor of Syndercombe is recorded as held by Turstin FitzRolf.

== Recreation ==
=== Angling ===
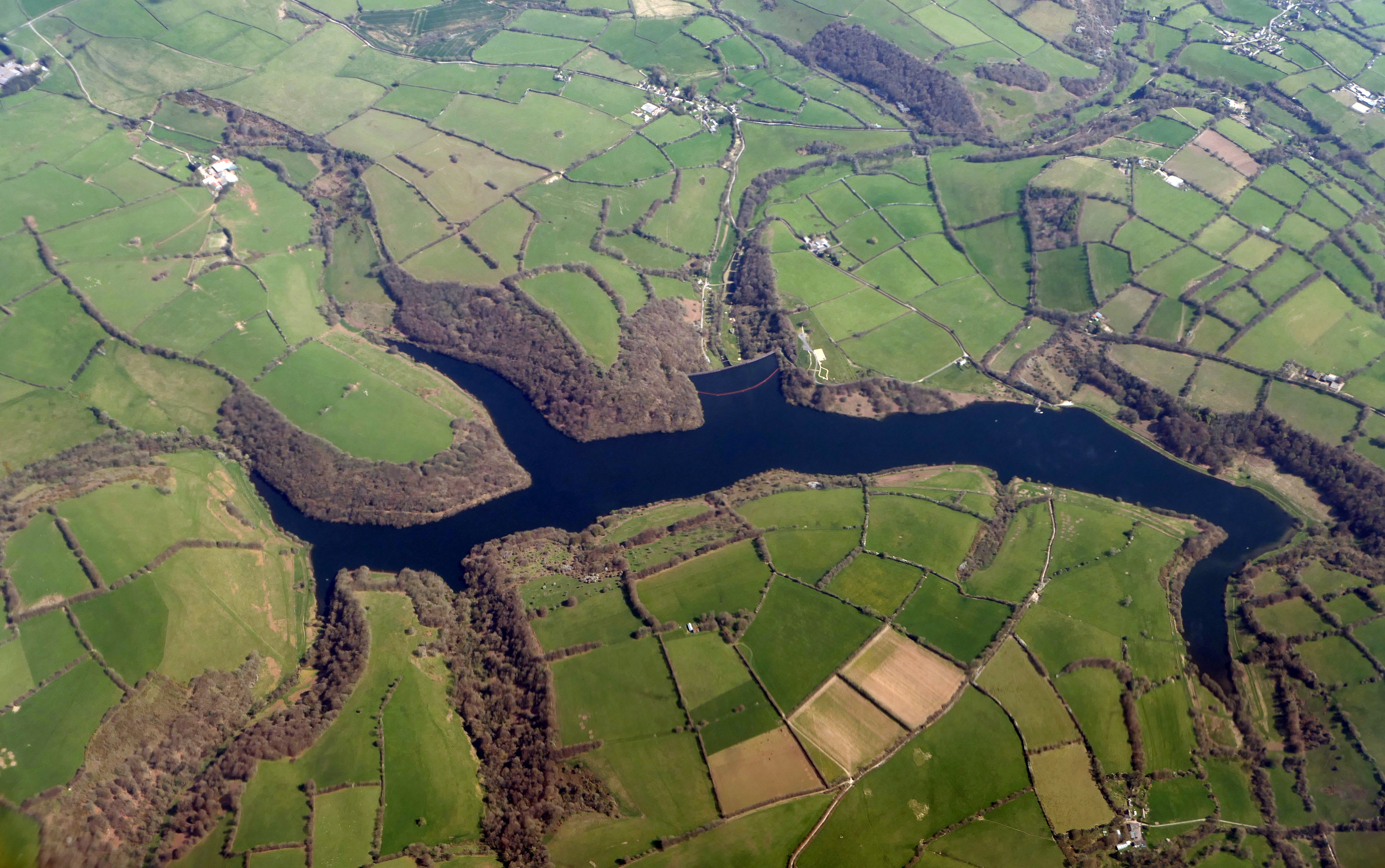
Aerial view of the reservoir.

There are seven water inlets at Clatworthy which are all described as hot spots for fishermen, but generally the south bank is considered to be the best area. Clatworthy offers top of the water fishing with nymphs or dry flies or, at the deep areas, with sinking lines and flashing lures. Rainbow and brown trout are commonly caught from the banks or from a boat and the lake is well stocked. Some areas of the bank are very steep or wooded and difficult to access.

=== Walking ===
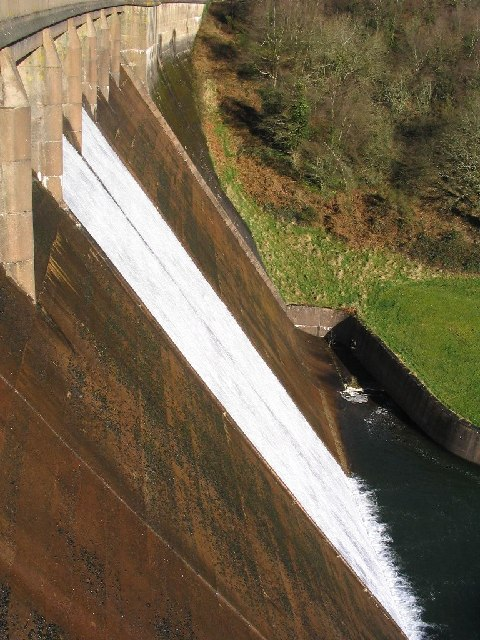
The dam

Clatworthy reservoir offers the chance to stroll at leisure through a short nature trail or, for the more adventurous, it is possible to walk the entire reservoir perimeter of five miles (8 km). There is ample parking and public toilets at the viewing area which is signposted from Wiveliscombe. From the viewing area visitors can take the perimeter walk - allow 2½ to 3 hours to complete this walk. The car park is open throughout the year, but is locked at sunset.

== Wildlife ==
Clatworthy reservoir features a range of habitats including acid grassland, Fox glove, broadleaf woodlands and scrub leading to marshy areas around the inlet streams. Clatworthy woodland is mainly beech with sessile oaks, silver birch and rowan. The site is home to a range of passage and woodland birds as well as geese, grebes and swans. Red deer, roe deer and badgers are often seen in the woods.
