= Caratacus Stone =

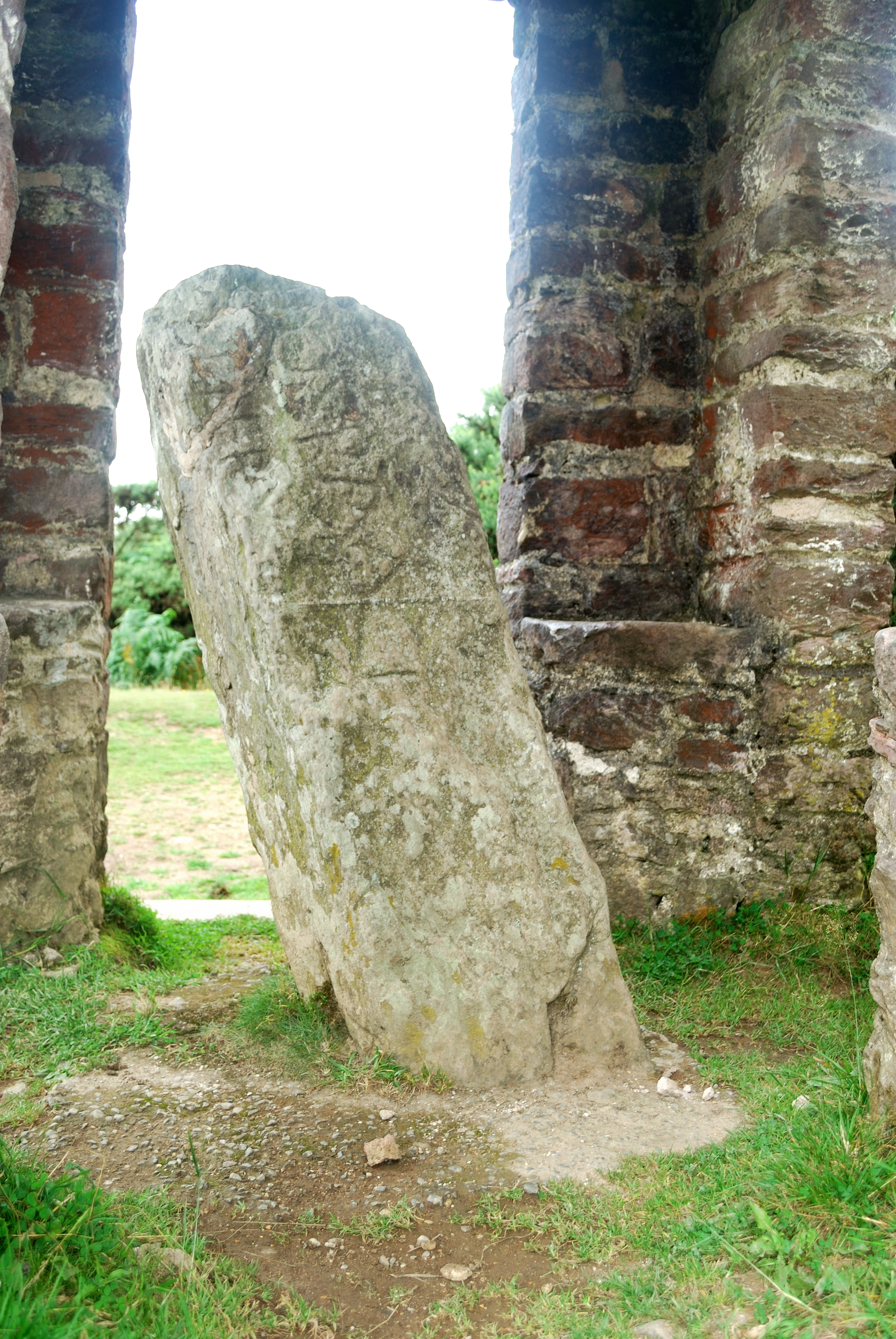
- Caratacus Stone, showing the inscription CARAACI NEPVS

- Location within Somerset
- 51.090527°N 3.586698°W
- Location: Winsford Hill, Exmoor, Somerset, England
- OS grid reference: SS88973355

History
- Built: Sub-Roman period (approximately sixth century)

Scheduled monument
- Official name: Caratacus Stone
- Reference no.: 1021228

The Caratacus Stone, sometimes known as the Caractacus Stone, is an inscribed stone on Exmoor in Somerset, England. It is thought to date from the 6th century, and it has been a scheduled monument since 1925.

The inscription, in Latin, appears to read CARAACI NEPVS, though experts have stated that a bar above the second A forms a ligature meaning that it should be read as CARATACI NEPVS. It is possible that there was more text on the stone that has weathered away.

The inscription, which can be translated as "grandson or immediate descendant of Caratacus", has led to the general opinion that the stone was probably erected as a memorial to a person who claimed the first-century British chieftain Caratacus as an ancestor.

The first mention of the stone was in 1219, when it was described in a perambulation of the Royal Forest of Exmoor as "the Langeston". In 1890 the letter N (which is reversed) was missing from the inscription, but by 1919 the missing piece had been found and was cemented back in place. In 1906 a shelter was erected over the stone, and an excavation in 1937 revealed that the stone was not associated with a burial site.

== Image gallery ==
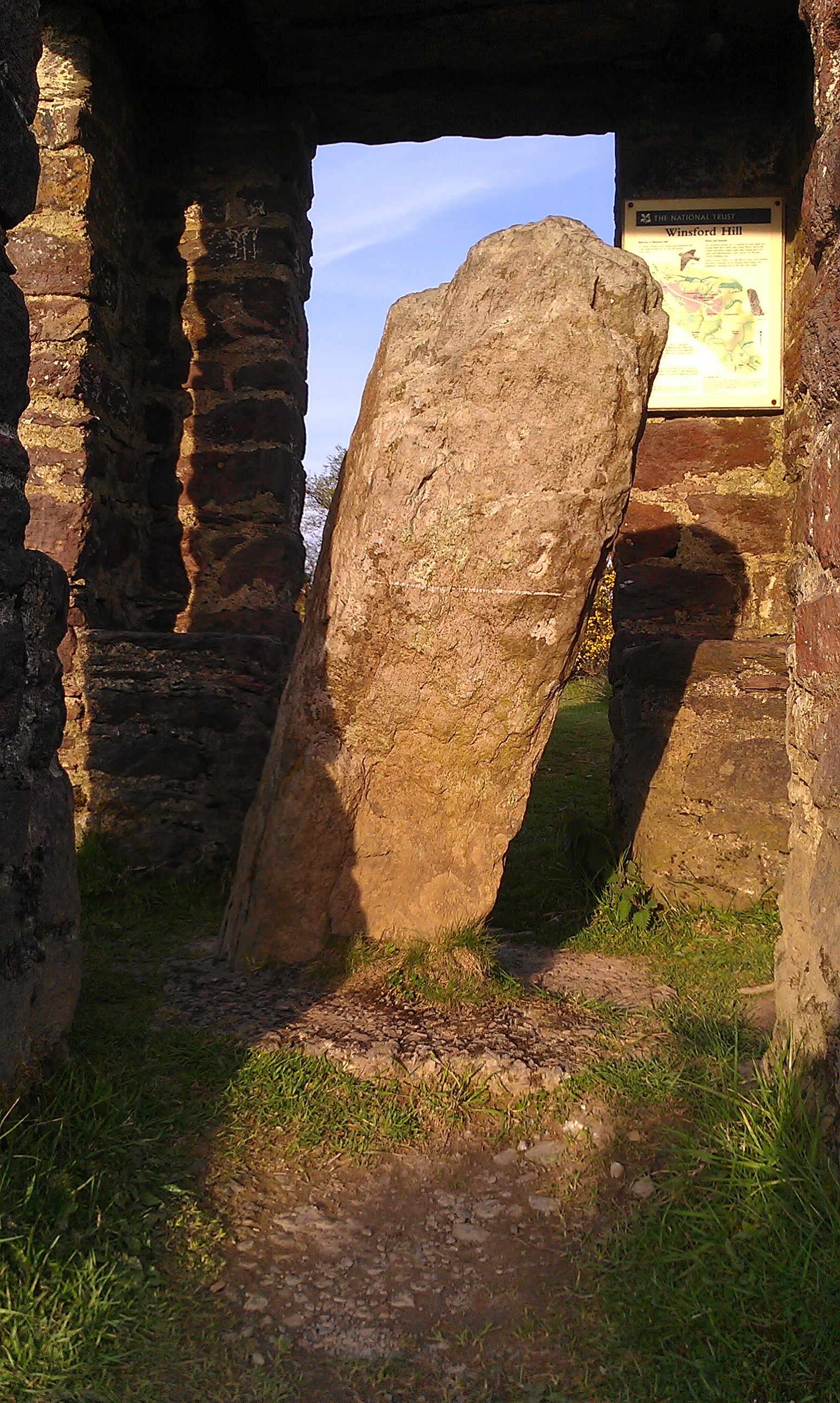
The Early Medieval Caratacus Stone on Exmoor, Somerset

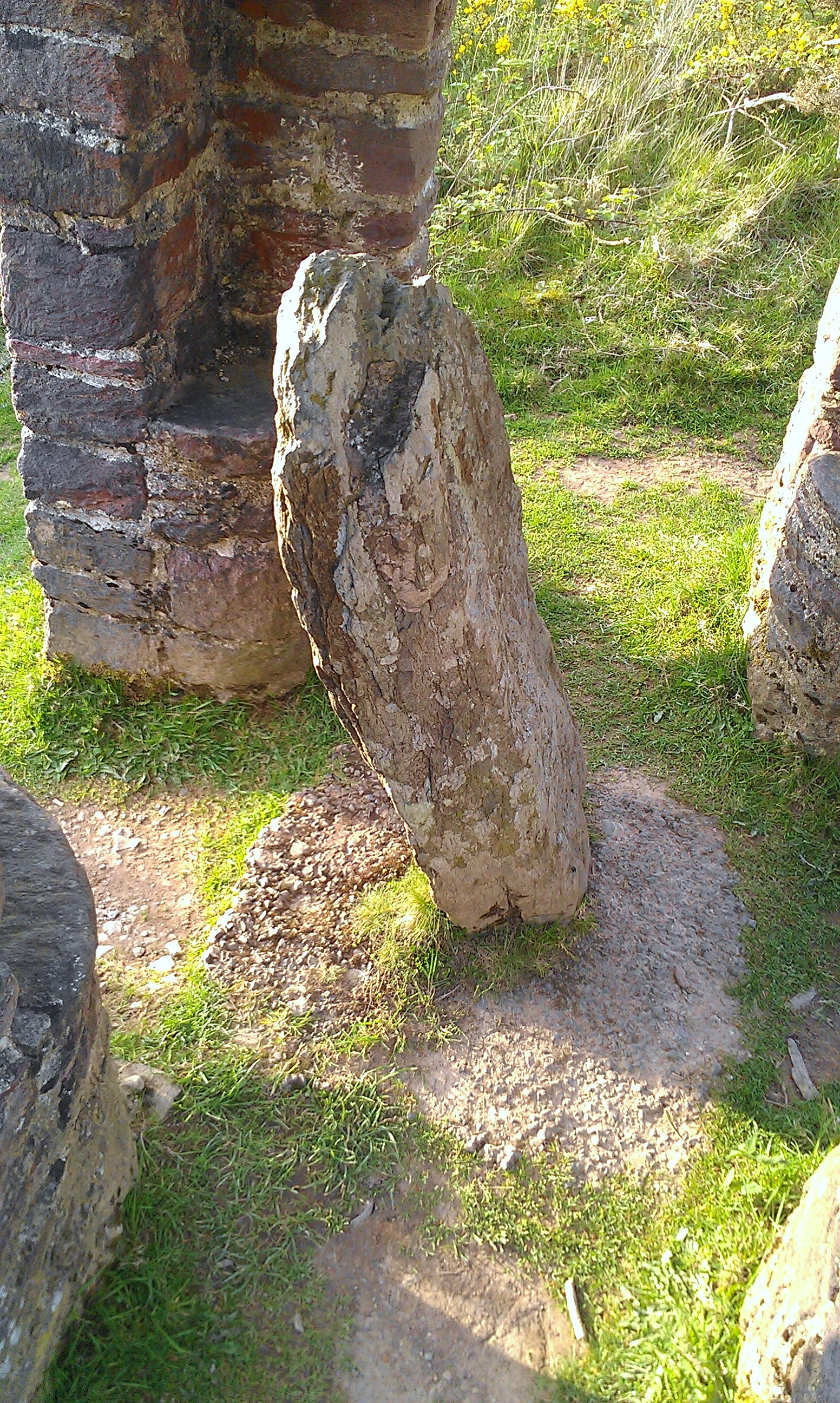
The Early Medieval Caratacus Stone on Exmoor, Somerset

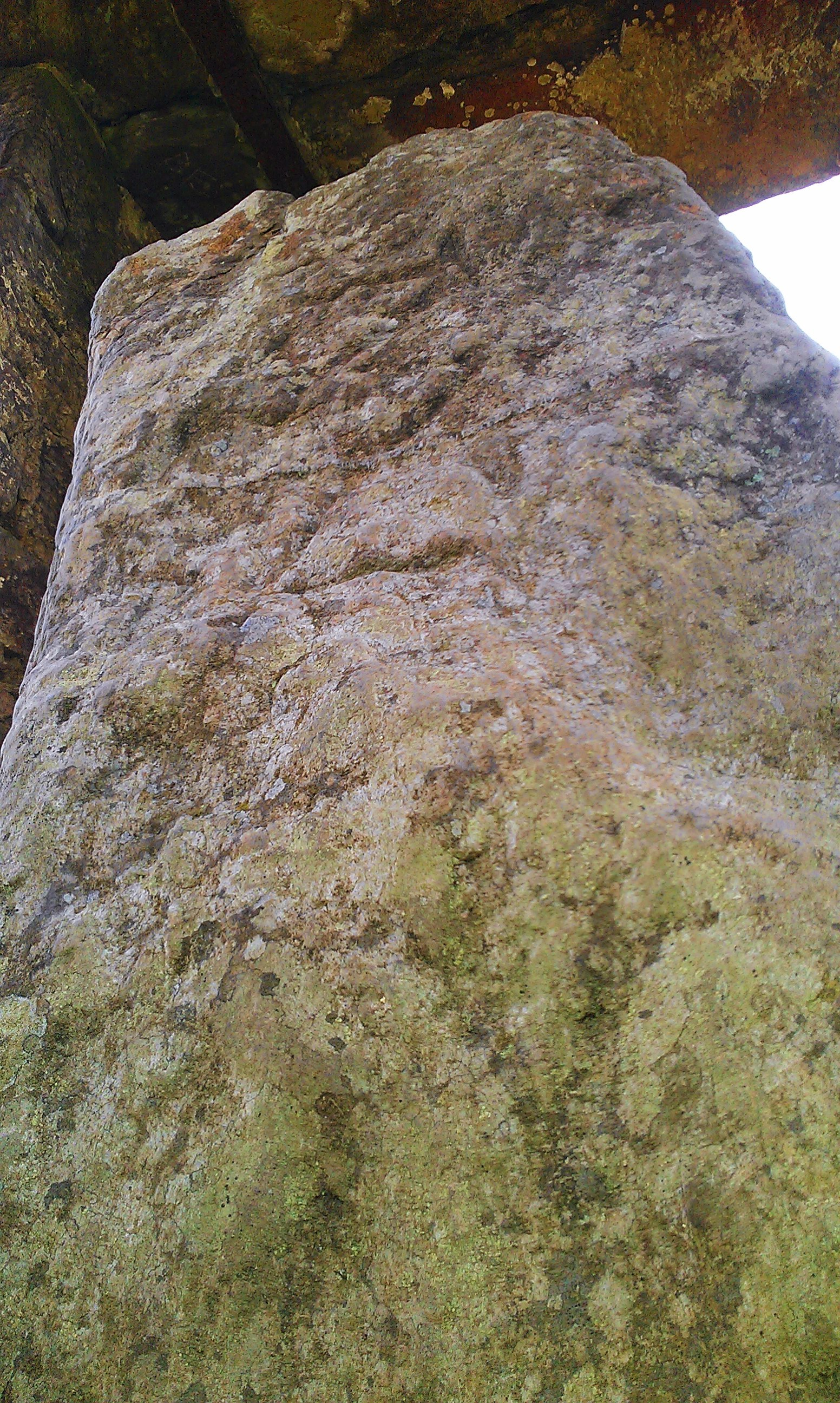
The Early Medieval Caratacus Stone on Exmoor, Somerset

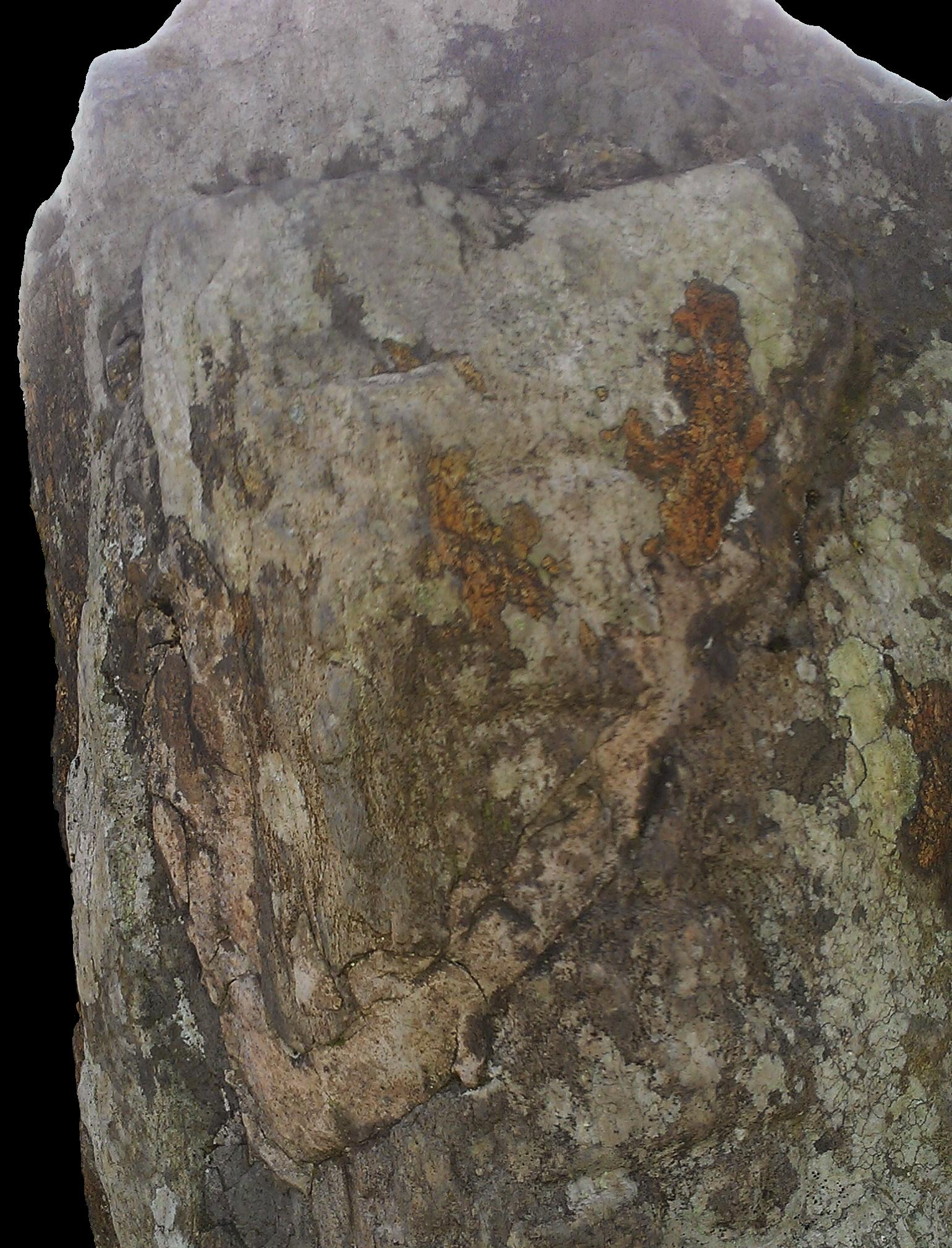
The Early Medieval Caratacus Stone on Exmoor, Somerset

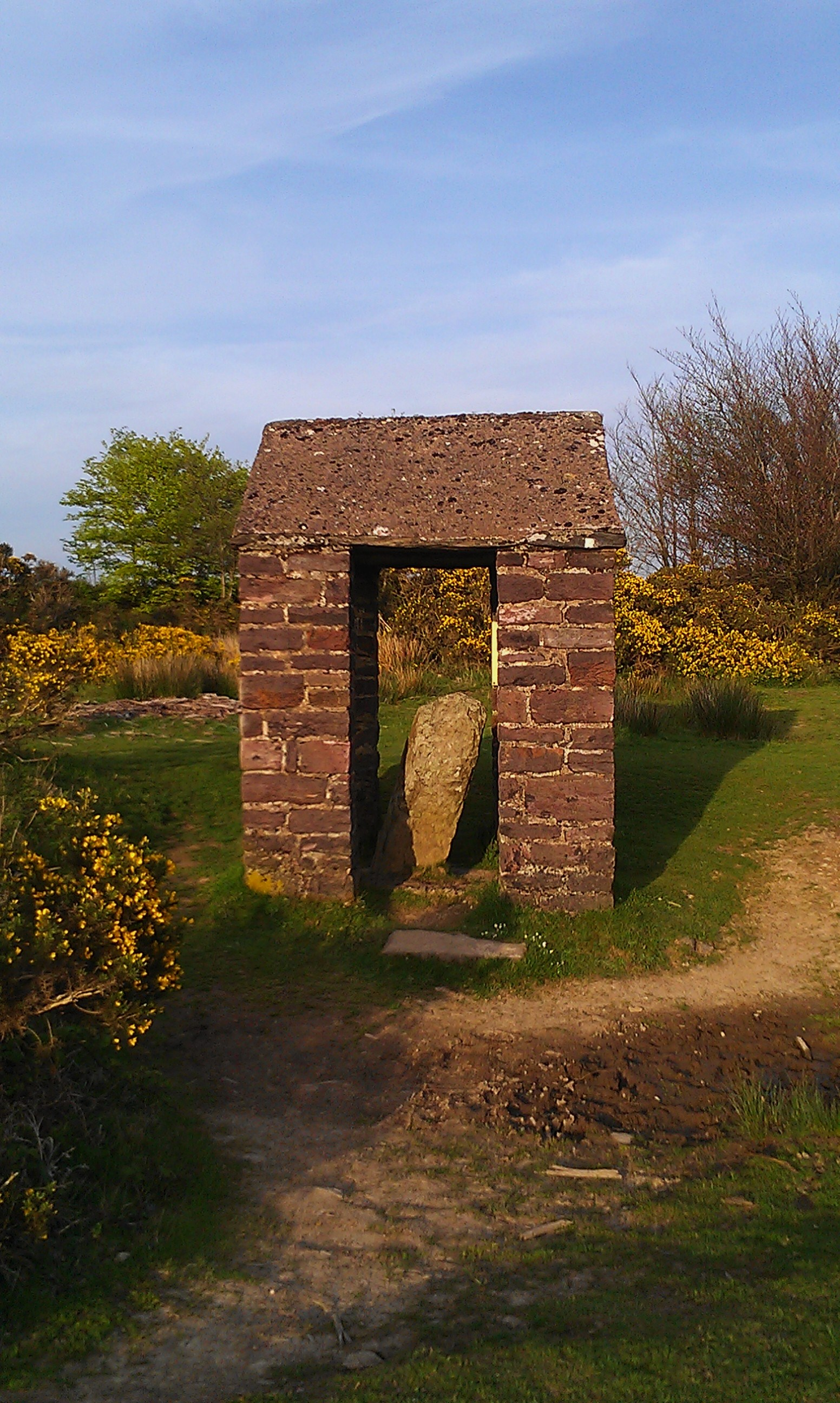
The Early Medieval Caratacus Stone on Exmoor, Somerset.

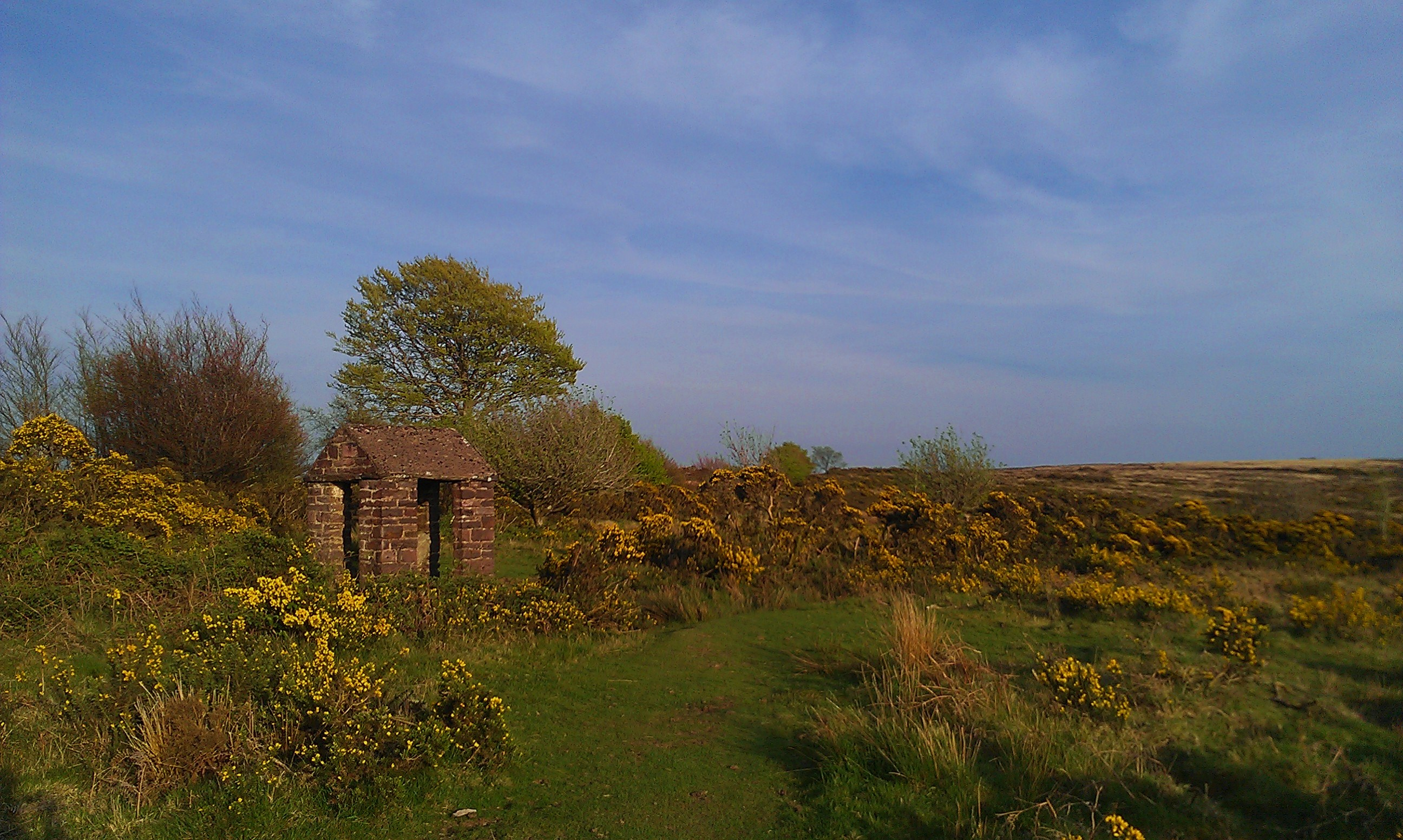
The Early Medieval Caratacus Stone on Exmoor, Somerset
