= Dovecot at Blackford Farm =

Grade II* listed building

Dovecot At Blackford Farm
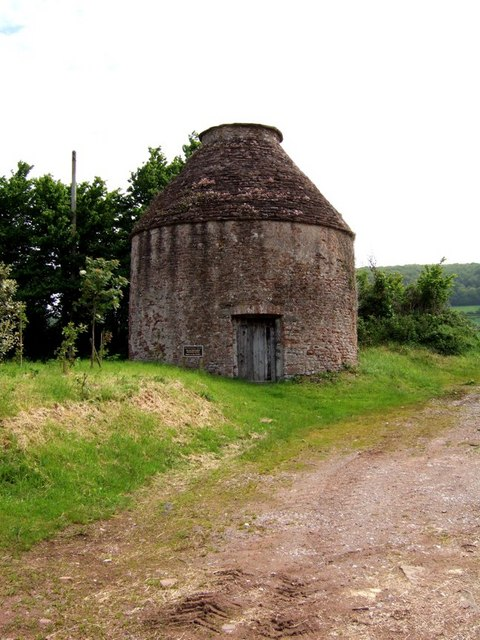

- Location within Somerset
- 51°11′48″N 3°32′25″W
- Location: Selworthy, Somerset, England

History
- Built: Probably 11th century

Site notes
- Owner: National Trust

Listed Building – Grade II*
- Official name: Dovecot At Blackford Farm
- Designated: 22 May 1969
- Reference no.: 1345406

Scheduled monument
- Official name: Dovecote at Little Blackford
- Designated: 4 April 1949
- Reference no.: 1020774

The Dovecot At Blackford Farm in Selworthy on Exmoor within the English county of Somerset was probably built in the 11th century. It is a Grade II* listed building, and scheduled monument.

The cylindrical stone dovecote has a cone shaped roof. It contains over 300 nest boxes. The pigeons would have been domesticated for food, possibly by Montacute Priory or by the local lord of the manor. It is now owned by the National Trust and used as a store for the neighbouring farm.

== History ==
The earliest written record of the dovecote was in 1393 although the exact date of construction is not known. It was attached to a mansion house which burnt down in 1875. The manor previously belonged to Montacute Priory, a Cluniac priory of the Benedictine order, founded between 1078 and 1102 although it is not known if the construction of the dovecote was undertaken by the priory or the Lovel family who later held the manor. Pigeons and doves were an important food source historically kept for their eggs, flesh (squab), and dung.

The dovecote which forms part of the property of the Holnicote Estate, was donated to the National Trust by Sir Richard Thomas Dyke Acland, 15th Baronet in 1944. It was scheduled as an ancient monument in 1949 and designated as a Grade II* listed building in 1969. Repairs were undertaken to the dovecote in 1993. The building is used as a store by the neighbouring farmer.

== Architecture ==
The building is cylindrical with an external diameter of 23 feet 6 inches (7.16 m) and is 15 feet (4.6 m) high to the eaves. The walls, which are 4 feet (1.2 m) thick, are built of Devonian sandstone. The doorway was widened to its current height of 6 feet 3 inches (1.91 m) high and 3 feet 6 inches (1.07 m) wide in the 19th century replacing a much smaller door which would have been present when it was used as a dovecote.

It contains over 300 nest holes. These are arranged into 11 tiers with an irregular pattern. Each of the boxes is approximately 11 inches (280 mm) wide and 20 inches (510 mm) wide but the opening is smaller than the interior of the box. The lowest boxes are about 2 feet 6 inches (0.76 m) above the earth floor which kept them above the damp and away from brown rats which became common in the area in the 18th century.

The original hole in the roof for the entry of the pigeons was covered by a flat stone and is now covered with glass to keep the interior dry. The interior of the roof has putlog holes rather than nesting boxes but may also have been used by pigeons.
