= Berry Castle, Black Dog =

Hillfort near Black Dog, Devon, England

Coordinates: 50.8667°N 3.7066°W

Berry Castle is an earthwork probably dating to the Iron Age close to Black Dog in Devon north of Crediton and west of Tiverton. It does not fit the traditional pattern of an Iron Age Hill fort. Although the earthwork would seem to be an incomplete enclosure, it is not at the top of a hill, although it is on the south east slope of a major hill which peaks at 199 Metres above Sea Level.
