= Bury Castle, Brompton Regis =

Bury Castle
- Brompton Regis, Somerset, England
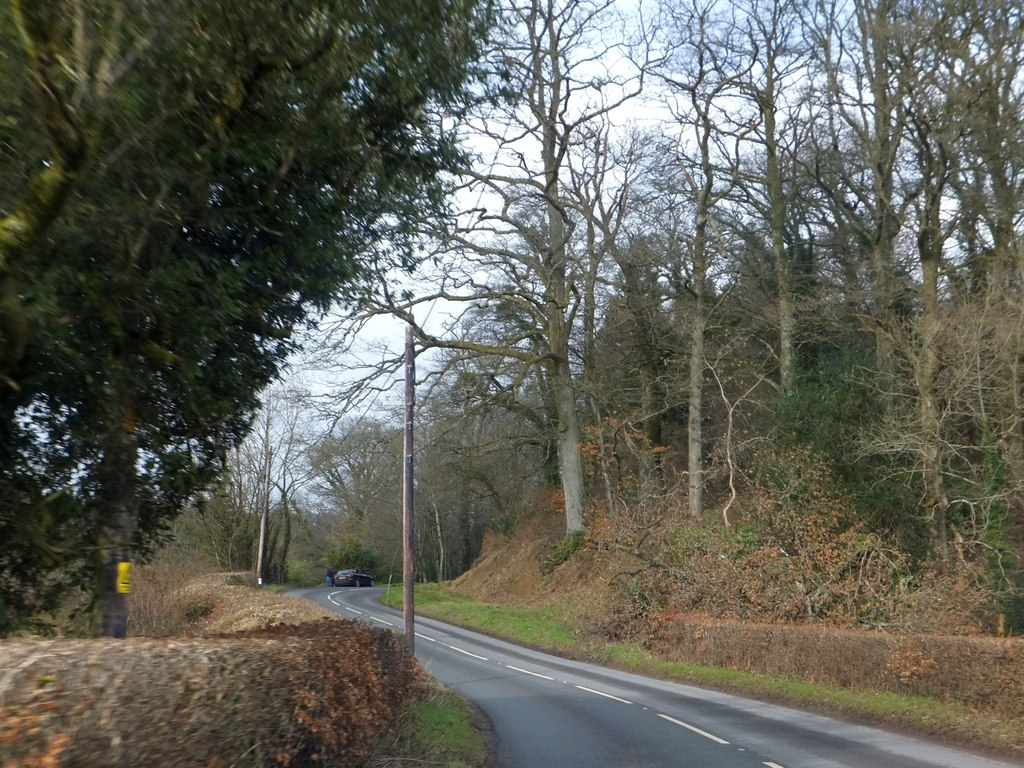
- The site of Bury Castle (to the right of the road)

Site information
- Type: Hillfort and later motte and bailey castle

Location
- Shown within Somerset and the British Isles
- Coordinates: 51.0311°N 3.5147°W
- Grid reference: grid reference SS938269

Bury Castle near Brompton Regis in the English county of Somerset was an Iron Age univallate hillfort which was reused with the creation of a motte after the Norman Conquest. It has been designated as a scheduled monument.

== Iron Age fort ==
It is an oval enclosure just above the confluence of the River Haddeo and River Exe. It is approximately 120 yards (110 m) long and 80 yards (73 m) wide.

== Medieval period ==
In the late 1130s, a civil war, known as the Anarchy, broke out in England between the supporters of King Stephen and the Empress Matilda. A motte and bailey castle was built on the Bury Castle side, probably by William de Say. In 1198 Richard I confirmed that Brompton should be part of the inheritance of Matilda.

The motte measures 23 metres (75 ft) and was placed on the southern tip of the promontory, with the bailey beyond around 60 metres (197 ft) across.
