= Black Ball Camp =

Iron Age hillfort in Somerset, England

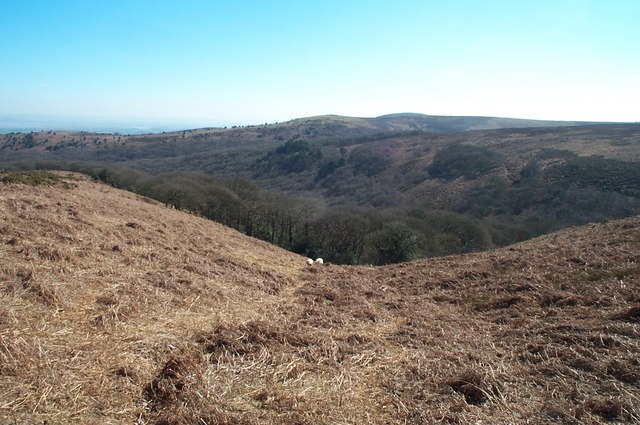
- Black Ball Hill

- Location within Somerset
- 51°10′27″N 3°27′14″W
- Location: Dunster, Somerset, England

History
- Built: Iron Age

Site notes
- Area: 0.3 hectares (0.74 acres)

Scheduled monument
- Official name: Black Ball Camp: a later prehistoric defended settlement on Gallox Hill
- Designated: 1 November 1934
- Reference no.: 1007668

Black Ball Camp is an Iron Age hillfort South West of Dunster, Somerset, England on the northern summit of Gallox Hill. It is a Scheduled Monument.

It is also known as British Camp and is possibly associated with Bat's Castle. It has a 3 metres (10 ft) high rampart and a 2 metres (7 ft) deep ditch. At the beginning of the 20th century the foundations of a stone tower were visible however this is no longer present.

== Background ==
Hillforts developed in the Late Bronze and Early Iron Age, roughly the start of the first millennium BC. The reason for their emergence in Britain, and their purpose, has been a subject of debate. It has been argued that they could have been military sites constructed in response to invasion from continental Europe, sites built by invaders, or a military reaction to social tensions caused by an increasing population and consequent pressure on agriculture. The dominant view since the 1960s has been that the increasing use of iron led to social changes in Britain. Deposits of iron ore were located in different places to the tin and copper ore necessary to make bronze, and as a result trading patterns shifted and the old elites lost their economic and social status. Power passed into the hands of a new group of people. Archaeologist Barry Cunliffe believes that population increase still played a role and has stated "[the forts] provided defensive possibilities for the community at those times when the stress [of an increasing population] burst out into open warfare. But I wouldn't see them as having been built because there was a state of war. They would be functional as defensive strongholds when there were tensions and undoubtedly some of them were attacked and destroyed, but this was not the only, or even the most significant, factor in their construction".

== See also ==
- List of hill forts and ancient settlements in Somerset
