= Barle Bridge =

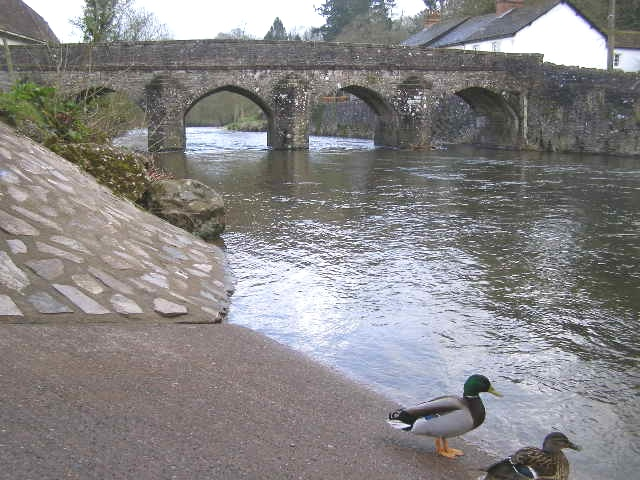
- Barle Bridge at Dulverton
- Coordinates: 51.0394°N 3.5531°W
- Carries: B3222
- Crosses: River Barle
- Locale: Dulverton, Somerset, England
- Heritage status: Ancient monument

Characteristics
- Design: Arch bridge
- Material: Stone
- No. of spans: 5

History
- Construction start: Middle Ages

Barle Bridge is a five span stone arch bridge over the River Barle in Dulverton within the English county of Somerset, which is medieval in origin. It has been scheduled as an ancient monument and is a Grade II listed building.

== History ==
The bridge was built in the Middle Ages at the site of an earlier ford.

It was repaired in 1624, and subsequently widened in 1819 by John Stone. It was further repaired in 1866 and in 1952–1953 after flood damage and again repaired after the 2012 flood.

The bridge is included in the Dulverton Conservation Area Appraisal.

== Architecture ==
The bridge which is built of local stone has five arches.

The bridge has double rings on the downstream side and single rings on the upstream side.
