= Bat's Castle =

Iron Age hillfort in Somerset, England

- Caesar's Camp
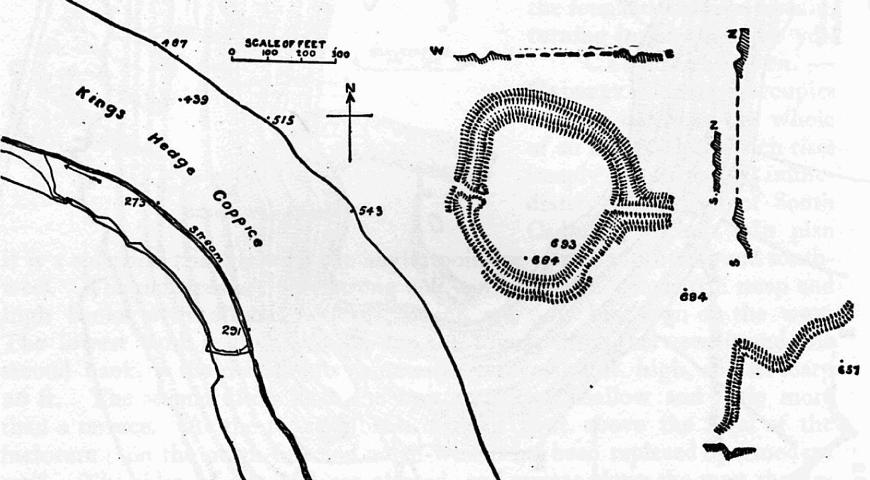
- Plan of earthworks at Bat's Castle

- Location within Somerset
- 51°10′11″N 3°26′59″W
- Type: Hillfort
- Periods: Iron Age
- Location: Carhampton, Somerset, England

Site notes
- Elevation: 213 m (699 ft)

Identifiers
- NHLE: 1007667
- Atlas of Hillforts: 4060

Scheduled monument
- Official name: Bat's Castle: a small multivallate hillfort and associated outwork
- Designated: 03 July 1964
- Reference no.: 1007667

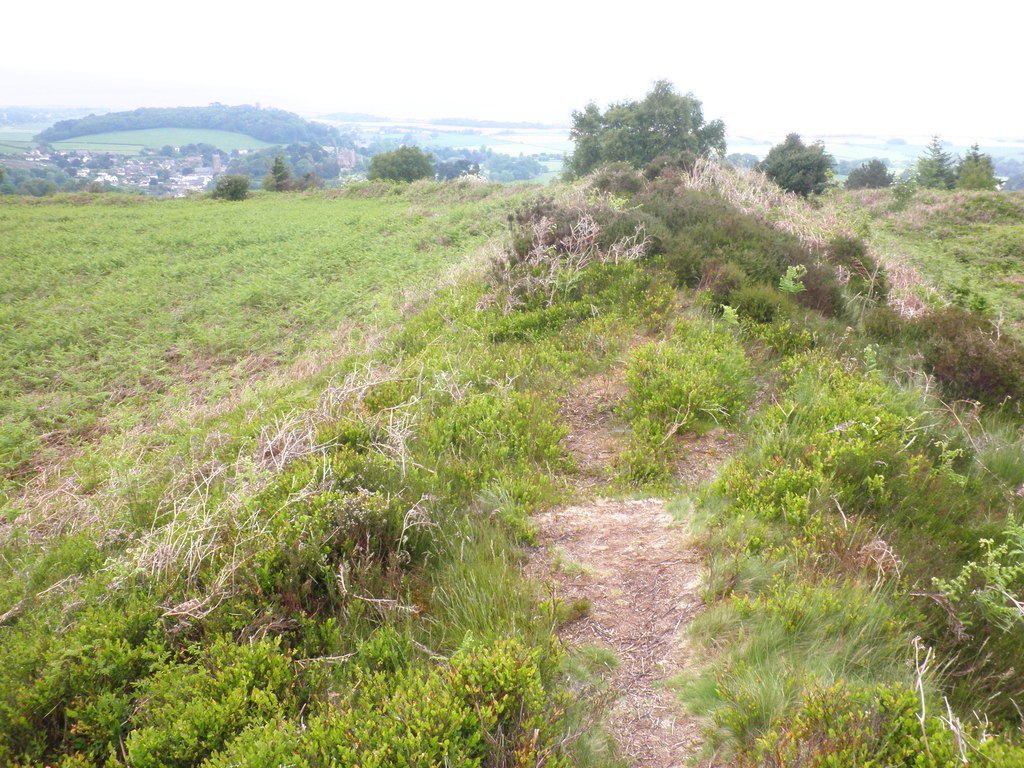
Mound and ditch of Bats Castle

Bats Castle is an Iron Age hillfort at the top of a 213 metres (699 ft) high hill in the parish of Carhampton south south west of Dunster in Somerset, England.

Though clearly shown on the 1902 Ordnance Survey 25 inch map (Somerset XXXV.14, Revised: 1902, Published: 1904), the site was "identified" in 1983 after some schoolboys found eight silver-plated coins dating from 102BC to AD350.

It is on the highest point of Gallox Hill. Previously it was known as Caesar's Camp and is possibly associated with Black Ball Camp. Bat's Castle has two stone ramparts and two ditches. The ramparts are damaged in places and the hill fort is partly covered in scrub.

Bat's Castle may once have been known as the legendary fortress Din Draithou, a place also associated with a fortress built or used by the legendary Irish king and raider Crimthann mac Fidaig.

The site is designated as a scheduled monument.

== Background ==
Hill forts developed in the Late Bronze and Early Iron Age, roughly the start of the first millennium BC. The reason for their emergence in Britain, and their purpose, has been a subject of debate. It has been argued that they could have been military sites constructed in response to invasion from continental Europe, sites built by invaders, or a military reaction to social tensions caused by an increasing population and consequent pressure on agriculture. The dominant view since the 1960s has been that the increasing use of iron led to social changes in Britain. Deposits of iron ore were located in different places to the tin and copper ore necessary to make bronze, and as a result trading patterns shifted and the old elites lost their economic and social status. Power passed into the hands of a new group of people. Archaeologist Barry Cunliffe believes that population increase still played a role and has stated "[the forts] provided defensive possibilities for the community at those times when the stress [of an increasing population] burst out into open warfare. But I wouldn't see them as having been built because there was a state of war. They would be functional as defensive strongholds when there were tensions and undoubtedly some of them were attacked and destroyed, but this was not the only, or even the most significant, factor in their construction".

== See also ==
- List of hill forts and ancient settlements in Somerset
