= Brendon Hills =

Range of hills in west Somerset, England

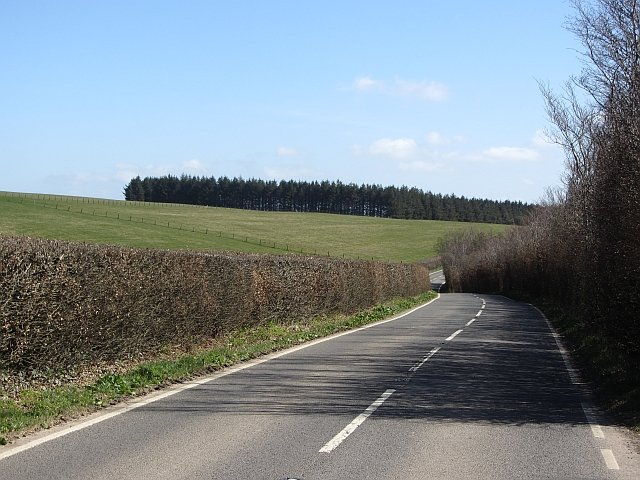
- Brendon Hills - B3224

Highest point
- Elevation: 1,388 ft (423 m)
- Coordinates: 51°07′26″N 3°30′04″W

Geography
- Location: Somerset, England
- OS grid: SS950371

The Brendon Hills are a range of hills in west Somerset, England. The hills merge level into the eastern side of Exmoor and are included within the Exmoor National Park. The highest point of the range is Lype Hill at 1,388 feet (423 m) above sea level with a secondary summit several kilometres to the southeast at 1,350 feet (411 m). Both points are marked by Ordnance Survey trig points and are located within enclosed farmland. Early versions of the name include Brunedun and Brundon reflecting an original name of Bruna or Brune, meaning 'brown one'. Dun is a common Old English word for a fairly flat and extensive hill. This name is not connected with the village of Brendon in Devon, the name of which has a different origin.

The terrain is broken by a series of deeply incised streams and rivers running roughly southwards to meet the River Haddeo, a tributary of the River Exe. The hills are quite heavily cultivated unlike their neighbouring upland areas of Exmoor and the Quantock Hills. The Brendon Hills are largely formed from the Morte Slates, a thick faulted and folded sequence of Devonian age sedimentary rocks. An east-west aligned anticline/syncline pair known as the Brendon Anticline and Brendon Syncline folds these rocks. The fold couplet is itself offset by displacement of the rocks on the NNW-SSE aligned Timberscombe Fault System. Over the centuries they have been mined for minerals, notably ironstone from which iron is extracted for making steel. During the 19th century this activity reached a peak with the West Somerset Mineral Railway, including an 800 feet (244 m) incline, being built to take the ore to Watchet from where it was sent to Ebbw Vale for smelting. The main mining operations ended when the mines were worked out towards the end of the 19th century.

The hills are on the route of the Coleridge Way and are also crossed by the Samaritans Way.
