= River Haddeo =

River in Somerset, England

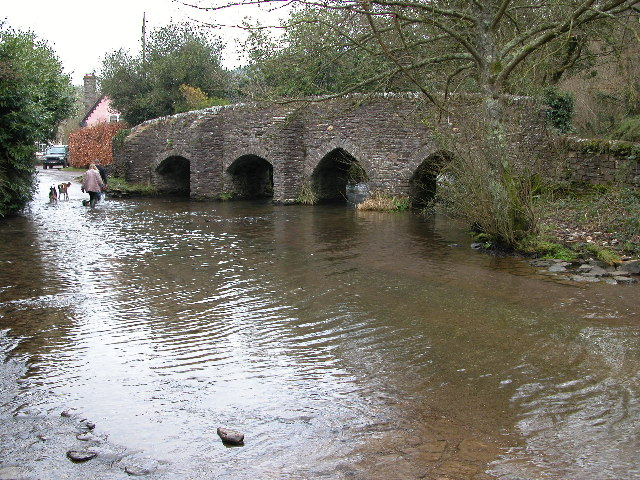
- Bridge and ford in the village of Bury

Location
- Country: England
- County: Somerset

Physical characteristics
- Source: Wimbleball Lake
  - location: Somerset, England
  - coordinates: 51°04′25″N 3°27′57″W
- Mouth: River Exe
  - location: Somerset, England
  - coordinates: 51°01′43″N 3°31′07″W

The River Haddeo on Exmoor in Somerset, England flows from the Wimbleball Lake to the River Exe.

The valley of the river consists of three tributary valleys extending down from the surrounding farmland to merge with the River Haddeo in the south. The tributary valleys include the River Pulham, which passes the village of Brompton Regis and continues to Hartford where it joins the Haddeo.

In 2001 - 2002 South West Water commissioned a detailed assessment of fish population, physical habitat, flow and water quality data within the River Haddeo, since it has been subject to regulated releases from Wimbleball Reservoir, to identify potential bottlenecks restricting the development of juvenile salmon populations.
