= Grade II* listed buildings in West Somerset =

West Somerset shown within the county of Somerset

West Somerset is a former local government district in the county of Somerset which is in South West England. In the United Kingdom, the term listed building refers to a building or other structure officially designated as being of special architectural, historical or cultural significance; Grade II* structures are those considered to be "particularly significant buildings of more than local interest". Listing was begun by a provision in the Town and Country Planning Act 1947. Once listed, severe restrictions are imposed on the modifications allowed to a building's structure or its fittings. In England, the authority for listing under the Planning (Listed Buildings and Conservation Areas) Act 1990 rests with Historic England, a non-departmental public body sponsored by the Department for Digital, Culture, Media and Sport; local authorities have a responsibility to regulate and enforce the planning regulations.

West Somerset is a largely rural area covering 740 square kilometres (290 sq mi). The district has a population, according to the 2011 census, of 35,300, with the largest centres of population in the coastal towns of Minehead and Watchet. The council's administrative headquarters were in the village of Williton.

There are 100 Grade II* listed buildings in West Somerset. The list includes a large number of churches and chapels, some of which are Norman. Stogursey Castle is also 12th century in origin. There are several churchyard and village crosses, which were small market crosses, dating from the 13th to 15th centuries. Packhorse bridges over Exmoor streams and some larger ones over rivers in the area are also included. The houses on the list range from the Middle Ages to early 20th century. Agricultural buildings include tithe barns, dovecotes and a watermill.

== Buildings ==
Name	Location	Type	Completed (Note: The date given is the date used by Historic England as significant for the initial building or that of an important part in the structure's description.)	Grid ref. (Note: The grid reference is based on the British national grid reference system, sometimes known as OSGB36, used by the Ordnance Survey.) Geo-coordinates	Entry number (Note: The "List Entry Number" is a unique number assigned to each listed building and scheduled monument by Historic England.)	Image	Ref.
2, The Avenue, Minehead	Minehead	House	15th century	SS969462; 51°12′21″N 3°28′36″W	1207003	2, The Avenue, Minehead	
4, 6 and 8, Church Street, Dunster	Dunster	House	15th century	SS991436; 51°11′00″N 3°26′40″W	1057644	4, 6 and 8, Church Street, Dunster More images	
Allerford New Bridge	Allerford	Bridge	Medieval	SS899466; 51°12′31″N 3°34′34″W	1058050	Upload Photo	
Barn at south entrance to churchyard, Church of St Mary	Stogumber	Tithe barn	17th century	ST098371; 51°07′37″N 3°17′23″W	1345646	Barn at south entrance to churchyard, Church of St Mary More images	
Binham Farmhouse	Old Cleeve	Farmhouse	16th century	ST035424; 51°10′23″N 3°22′52″W	1345628	Binham Farmhouse More images	
Bury Bridge	Brompton Regis	Bridge	Medieval	SS944274; 51°02′12″N 3°30′23″W	1263985	Bury Bridge More images	
Butter Cross	Dunster	Wayside cross	Late C14/Early 15th century	SS988438; 51°11′06″N 3°26′57″W	1345602	Butter Cross More images	
Castle Mill and attached gateway and gate	Dunster	Watermill	Late 17th century	SS991433; 51°10′49″N 3°26′41″W	1173447	Castle Mill and attached gateway and gate More images	
Causeway Bridge at east entrance to Stogursey Castle	Stogursey	Causeway	14th century	ST203425; 51°10′37″N 3°08′29″W	1295315	Causeway Bridge at east entrance to Stogursey Castle More images	
Chantry	Stogumber	Chantry	Early 16th century	ST096385; 51°08′21″N 3°17′33″W	1295636	Upload Photo	
Chapel Cleeve Hotel	Old Cleeve	Country house	1818–1823	ST035429; 51°10′41″N 3°22′52″W	1057541	Chapel Cleeve Hotel More images	
Chapel of St Leonard	Tivington	Chapel	14th century	SS933450; 51°11′41″N 3°31′41″W	1345394	Chapel of St Leonard More images	
Chargot House	Luxborough	House	1826	SS980371; 51°07′28″N 3°27′31″W	1057339	Chargot House	
Church House and pound adjoining to the North West	Crowcombe	House	1515	ST140366; 51°07′22″N 3°13′47″W	1057446	Church House and pound adjoining to the North West More images	
Church of All Saints	Dulverton	Church	15th century	SS914280; 51°02′28″N 3°32′59″W	1247824	Church of All Saints More images	
Church of Saint Mary	Kilve	Church	14th century	ST146439; 51°11′17″N 3°13′21″W	1345709	Church of Saint Mary More images	
Church of St Andrew	Minehead	Church	1877–1880	SS967461; 51°12′19″N 3°28′44″W	1207013	Church of St Andrew More images	
Church of St Andrew	Withypool	Church	Late medieval	SS846355; 51°06′29″N 3°38′58″W	1057968	Church of St Andrew More images	
Church of St Bartholomew	Rodhuish	Chapel	15th century	ST012395; 51°08′50″N 3°24′49″W	1175299	Church of St Bartholomew More images	
Church of St Etheldreda	West Quantoxhead	Church	1854–1856	ST113420; 51°10′13″N 3°16′11″W	1175935	Church of St Etheldreda More images	
Church of St George	Sampford Brett	Church	c. 1300	ST089401; 51°09′14″N 3°18′12″W	1295828	Church of St George More images	
Church of St Giles	Hawkridge	Church	Norman	SS861306; 51°03′50″N 3°37′36″W	1174221	Church of St Giles More images	
Church of St John	Cutcombe	Church	13th and early 14th century	SS931392; 51°08′33″N 3°31′46″W	1174575	Church of St John More images	
Church of St John	Skilgate	Church	14th century	SS986272; 51°02′08″N 3°26′47″W	1248077	Church of St John More images	
Church of St Martin	Elworthy	Church	13th century	ST082349; 51°06′24″N 3°18′41″W	1057601	Church of St Martin More images	
Church of St Mary	Brompton Ralph	Church	15th century	ST085323; 51°04′59″N 3°18′27″W	1057972	Church of St Mary More images	
Church of St Mary	Brompton Regis	Church	13th century	SS951314; 51°04′23″N 3°29′53″W	1057978	Church of St Mary More images	
Church of St Mary	East Quantoxhead	Church	14th century	ST136436; 51°11′08″N 3°14′13″W	1057410	Church of St Mary More images	
Church of St Mary	Oare	Church	15th century	SS802473; 51°12′45″N 3°42′59″W	1345381	Church of St Mary More images	
Church of St Mary Magdalene	Withiel Florey	Church	12th century	SS986332; 51°05′24″N 3°26′53″W	1057984	Church of St Mary Magdalene More images	
Church of St Mary Magdalene	Clatworthy	Church	12th century	ST052309; 51°04′12″N 3°21′13″W	1263926	Church of St Mary Magdalene More images	
Church of St Mary Magdelene	Exford	Church	15th Century	SS857385; 51°08′04″N 3°38′03″W	1057319	Church of St Mary Magdelene More images	
Church of St Peter	Exton	Church	Norman	SS925337; 51°05′33″N 3°32′07″W	1296311	Church of St Peter More images	
Church of St Peter	Treborough	Church	Early 14th century	ST010363; 51°07′05″N 3°24′54″W	1295414	Church of St Peter More images	
Church of St Peter	Williton	Church	1896	ST075407; 51°09′31″N 3°19′24″W	1174922	Church of St Peter More images	
Churchyard Cross About 3 Metres South East Of Porch, Culbone Church	Culbone	Cross	15th century	SS842482; 51°13′17″N 3°39′34″W	1173301	Churchyard Cross About 3 Metres South East Of Porch, Culbone Church More images	
Churchyard Cross, 10m south of porch, Church of Saint Mary	East Quantoxhead	Cross	Late 14th century	ST136436; 51°11′08″N 3°14′13″W	1057411	Churchyard Cross, 10m south of porch, Church of Saint Mary More images	
Churchyard Cross, 2 Metres South Of Porch, Church of The Holy Ghost	Crowcombe	Cross	14th century	ST140366; 51°07′23″N 3°13′45″W	1057442	Churchyard Cross, 2 Metres South Of Porch, Church of The Holy Ghost More images	
Churchyard Cross, 7m north of nave, Church of St Mary	Holford	Cross	Late 13th century	ST156411; 51°09′46″N 3°12′27″W	1345684	Upload Photo	
Churchyard Cross, 8 metres east of chancel, Church of St George	Bicknoller	Cross	14th century	ST111394; 51°08′50″N 3°16′20″W	1057466	Churchyard Cross, 8 metres east of chancel, Church of St George	
Churchyard Cross, in churchyard about 6 metres south of south aisle, Church of St Andrew	Old Cleeve	Cross	Early 14th century	ST041419; 51°10′06″N 3°22′23″W	1057553	Churchyard Cross, in churchyard about 6 metres south of south aisle, Church of St Andrew More images	
Churchyard Cross, 5m south of porch, Church of St Mary	Stringston	Cross	Late 14th century	ST176423; 51°10′29″N 3°10′46″W	1308144	Churchyard Cross, 5m south of porch, Church of St Mary More images	
Combe	Dulverton	Manor house	Late 16th century	SS912266; 51°01′45″N 3°33′10″W	1247793	Combe More images	
Cross in Churchyard South of Church Porch	Watchet	Cross	Probably early 15th century	ST064426; 51°10′33″N 3°20′20″W	1057663	Cross in Churchyard South of Church Porch More images	
Croydon House	Timberscombe	House	c. 1700	SS962406; 51°09′21″N 3°29′05″W	1057345	Upload Photo	
Dodington Hall	Dodington	Manor house	15th century	ST172405; 51°09′29″N 3°11′06″W	1057421	Dodington Hall More images	
Dovecot At Blackford Farm	Selworthy	Dovecote	Late medieval	SS924452; 51°11′48″N 3°32′25″W	1345406	Dovecot At Blackford Farm More images	
Dovecote	Dunster	Dovecote	Late 16th century	SS990437; 51°11′02″N 3°26′46″W	1057581	Dovecote More images	
Doverhay Reading Room And Cottage Abutting North End	Porlock	House	Late 15th century	SS888467; 51°12′33″N 3°35′35″W	1296210	Doverhay Reading Room And Cottage Abutting North End More images	
Fair Garden Farmhouse	Wootton Courtenay	House	16th century	SS932421; 51°10′07″N 3°31′41″W	1175358	Fair Garden Farmhouse More images	
Fairfield House	Stogursey	House	Medieval	ST187429; 51°10′49″N 3°09′49″W	1175243	Fairfield House More images	
Gatehouse and adjoining Gatehouse Cottage	Holnicote Estate	Cross passage house	16th or 17th century	SS910462; 51°12′18″N 3°33′39″W	1173887	Gatehouse and adjoining Gatehouse Cottage	
Govett Family Chest Tomb, In Churchyard One Metre West Of Porch, Church of St Mary	Stringston	Chest tomb	Early 17th century	ST176423; 51°10′29″N 3°10′46″W	1345706	Govett Family Chest Tomb, In Churchyard One Metre West Of Porch, Church of St Mary More images	
Halsway Manor	Bicknoller	Manor house	15th century	ST126382; 51°08′12″N 3°15′00″W	1057472	Halsway Manor More images	
Hartrow Manor	Stogumber	Farmhouse	Late 18th century	ST095347; 51°06′18″N 3°17′35″W	1057532	Hartrow Manor	
Kentsford Farmhouse	Watchet	Farmhouse	Probably late medieval	ST058425; 51°10′29″N 3°20′52″W	1180276	Kentsford Farmhouse More images	
The Kildare Lodge Inn	Minehead	House	1903	SS969457; 51°12′07″N 3°28′37″W	1279930	The Kildare Lodge Inn More images	
Landacre Bridge	Withypool	Bridge	Late medieval	SS816361; 51°06′44″N 3°41′32″W	1058006	Landacre Bridge More images	
Linhay, barn and farm buildings adjoining on north-east side of foldyard at Bratton Court	Minehead Without	Farm building	19th century	SS946462; 51°12′22″N 3°30′35″W	1175044	Linhay, barn and farm buildings adjoining on north-east side of foldyard at Bratton Court	
Luttrell Arms Hotel	Dunster	House	Late 15th or early 16th century	SS991438; 51°11′05″N 3°26′39″W	1057611	Luttrell Arms Hotel More images	
Lynch Chapel Of Ease	Selworthy	Chapel	c. 1530	SS900476; 51°13′03″N 3°34′33″W	1057997	Lynch Chapel Of Ease More images	
Manor Farmhouse, Gatepiers, Walls And Railings returned around Forecourt	Brompton Ralph	Farmhouse	c. 1720 enlarged	ST089313; 51°04′26″N 3°18′05″W	1057971	Upload Photo	
Marshwood Farmhouse	Blue Anchor	Farmhouse	Late 15th century	ST022429; 51°10′39″N 3°23′59″W	1057364	Marshwood Farmhouse More images	
Old Manor Guesthouse	Dunster	House	Mid-late 15th century	SS995449; 51°11′42″N 3°26′23″W	1345608	Old Manor Guesthouse	
Old Vicarage	Stogumber	House	Late 16th or early 17th century	ST097373; 51°07′40″N 3°17′27″W	1057501	Old Vicarage	
Packhorse Bridge At NGR SS 8670 3748, about 50m west Of Lyncombe	Lyncombe	Packhorse bridge	17th or 18th century	SS867374; 51°07′31″N 3°37′12″W	1174159	Upload Photo	
Packhorse bridge	Horner	Packhorse bridge	Late medieval	SS897455; 51°11′55″N 3°34′47″W	1057326	Packhorse bridge More images	
Packhorse Bridge	Luccombe	Packhorse bridge	Late medieval	SS898461; 51°12′13″N 3°34′40″W	1174852	Packhorse Bridge More images	
Packhorse Bridge	Allerford	Packhorse bridge	Medieval	SS905469; 51°12′40″N 3°34′08″W	1058014	Packhorse Bridge More images	
Parish Church of St Michael	Minehead	Church	15th century	SS966467; 51°12′39″N 3°28′50″W	1207000	Parish Church of St Michael More images	
Pixton Park	Dulverton	Country house	c. 1760	SS924271; 51°02′02″N 3°32′05″W	1247974	Pixton Park More images	
Pollard Chest Tomb. In Churchyard about 24m south of Porch, Church of St Mary	Kilve	Chest tomb	17th century	ST146439; 51°11′17″N 3°13′21″W	1057390	Upload Photo	
Prior Family Chest Tomb And encircling Wrought Iron Railings. In Churchyard, 10m south Of South Chapel, Church of St Mary	Stringston	Chest tomb	Early 17th century	ST176423; 51°10′29″N 3°10′46″W	1308149	Upload Photo	
Priors Farmhouse including Farm Buildings adjoining to East	Stringston	Farmhouse	15th century	ST177425; 51°10′36″N 3°10′41″W	1308154	Priors Farmhouse including Farm Buildings adjoining to East	
Priory Cottage, Chantry Cottage and Dairy, abutting South West Corner Of Priory Cottage	Kilve	House	14th century	ST146440; 51°11′20″N 3°13′23″W	1175110	Upload Photo	
Raleigh's Cross	Nettlecombe	Cross	13th century	ST038344; 51°06′04″N 3°22′27″W	1057573	Upload Photo	
Remains of Chantry, Abutting East Side of Chantry Cottage	Kilve	Chantry	Early 14th century	ST146440; 51°11′20″N 3°13′22″W	1345688	Remains of Chantry, Abutting East Side of Chantry Cottage More images	
Remains of Churchyard Cross About 4 Metres East Of South Aisle, Church of All Saints	Selworthy	Cross	15th century	SS919467; 51°12′36″N 3°32′51″W	1058028	Remains of Churchyard Cross About 4 Metres East Of South Aisle, Church of All Saints More images	
Remains of churchyard cross	West Quantoxhead	Cross	15th century	ST113419; 51°10′13″N 3°16′11″W	1057387	Upload Photo	
Remains of Churchyard Cross, About 15 Metres North of North Aisle Door, Church of St Peter	Williton	Cross	Late 13th century	ST075407; 51°09′31″N 3°19′25″W	1057462	Remains of Churchyard Cross, About 15 Metres North of North Aisle Door, Church of St Peter	
Remains of Churchyard Cross. In Churchyard 2m north-east of Porch, Church of All Saints	Dodington, Holford	Cross	14th century	ST172405; 51°09′30″N 3°11′07″W	1345682	Remains of Churchyard Cross. In Churchyard 2m north-east of Porch, Church of All Saints	
Remains of churchyard cross about 18m east of Chancel, Church of St Mary	Luccombe	Cross	15th century	SS911445; 51°11′23″N 3°33′34″W	1057329	Upload Photo	
Remains of Churchyard Cross. In Churchyard about 18m south of Nave, Church of All Saints	Wootton Courtenay	Cross	Early 15th century	SS938434; 51°10′48″N 3°31′14″W	1175433	Remains of Churchyard Cross. In Churchyard about 18m south of Nave, Church of All Saints More images	
Remains of Market Cross opposite Egremont Hotel	Williton	Cross	14th century	ST077409; 51°09′37″N 3°19′15″W	1345670	Remains of Market Cross opposite Egremont Hotel More images	
Remains of Roadside Cross At NGR ST 0435 4174	Old Cleeve	Cross	14th century	ST043417; 51°10′01″N 3°22′10″W	1174166	Remains of Roadside Cross At NGR ST 0435 4174 More images	
Remains of Roadside Cross at NGR ST 0883 4288	Doniford, Williton	Cross	Early 15th century	ST088428; 51°10′40″N 3°18′22″W	1057482	Remains of Roadside Cross at NGR ST 0883 4288 More images	
Remains of The Church of St James	Upton	Church	14th century	SS980295; 51°03′21″N 3°27′23″W	1248084	Remains of The Church of St James More images	
Remains of Village Cross	Stogursey	Cross	13th or 14th century	ST202428; 51°10′47″N 3°08′33″W	1345701	Upload Photo	
Statue of Queen Anne	Minehead	Statue	1719	SS967461; 51°12′19″N 3°28′44″W	1207015	Statue of Queen Anne More images	
Steyning Manor	Stogursey	Cross passage house	Late 15th or early 16th century	ST219427; 51°10′44″N 3°07′04″W	1057395	Upload Photo	
Stogursey Castle	Stogursey	Castle	12th century	ST203425; 51°10′37″N 3°08′29″W	1057403	Stogursey Castle More images	
Stoke Pero Church	Stoke Pero, Luccombe	Church	13th century	SS878434; 51°10′47″N 3°36′22″W	1174803	Stoke Pero Church More images	
Stone	Exford	House	Mid-late 18th century	SS878434; 51°08′14″N 3°37′23″W	1345753	Stone More images	
Tithe Barn and Tithe Barn Cottage	Selworthy	House	Late medieval	SS918467; 51°12′35″N 3°32′58″W	1057990	Tithe Barn and Tithe Barn Cottage More images	
Village Cross, 30m east Of the Carew Arms	Crowcombe	Cross	14th century	ST139367; 51°07′25″N 3°13′54″W	1057441	Village Cross, 30m east Of the Carew Arms More images	
Weacombe House	West Quantoxhead	Country house	Mid 18th century	ST109406; 51°09′28″N 3°16′29″W	1175891	Upload Photo	
Willett House	Elworthy	House	c. 1816	ST110345; 51°06′13″N 3°16′20″W	1057561	Willett House More images	
Williton Hospital	Williton	Hospital	1838–1840	ST082414; 51°09′52″N 3°18′50″W	1057488	Williton Hospital More images	
Withypool Bridge	Withypool	Bridge	19th century	SS845354; 51°06′24″N 3°39′04″W	1057969	Withypool Bridge More images	
Wood Tenament	Dulverton	Farmhouse	17th century extended	SS916279; 51°02′25″N 3°32′49″W	1247931	Upload Photo	

== See also ==
- Grade II* listed buildings in Somerset
- Grade I listed buildings in Somerset
