= Doddington Hall =

Doddington Hall may refer to:

- Doddington Hall, Lincolnshire
- Doddington Hall, Cheshire
- Doddington Hall, Victorian residence replacing the Rectory in Doddington, Cambridgeshire

== See also ==
- Dodington Hall in Somerset
