= Court House, East Quantoxhead =

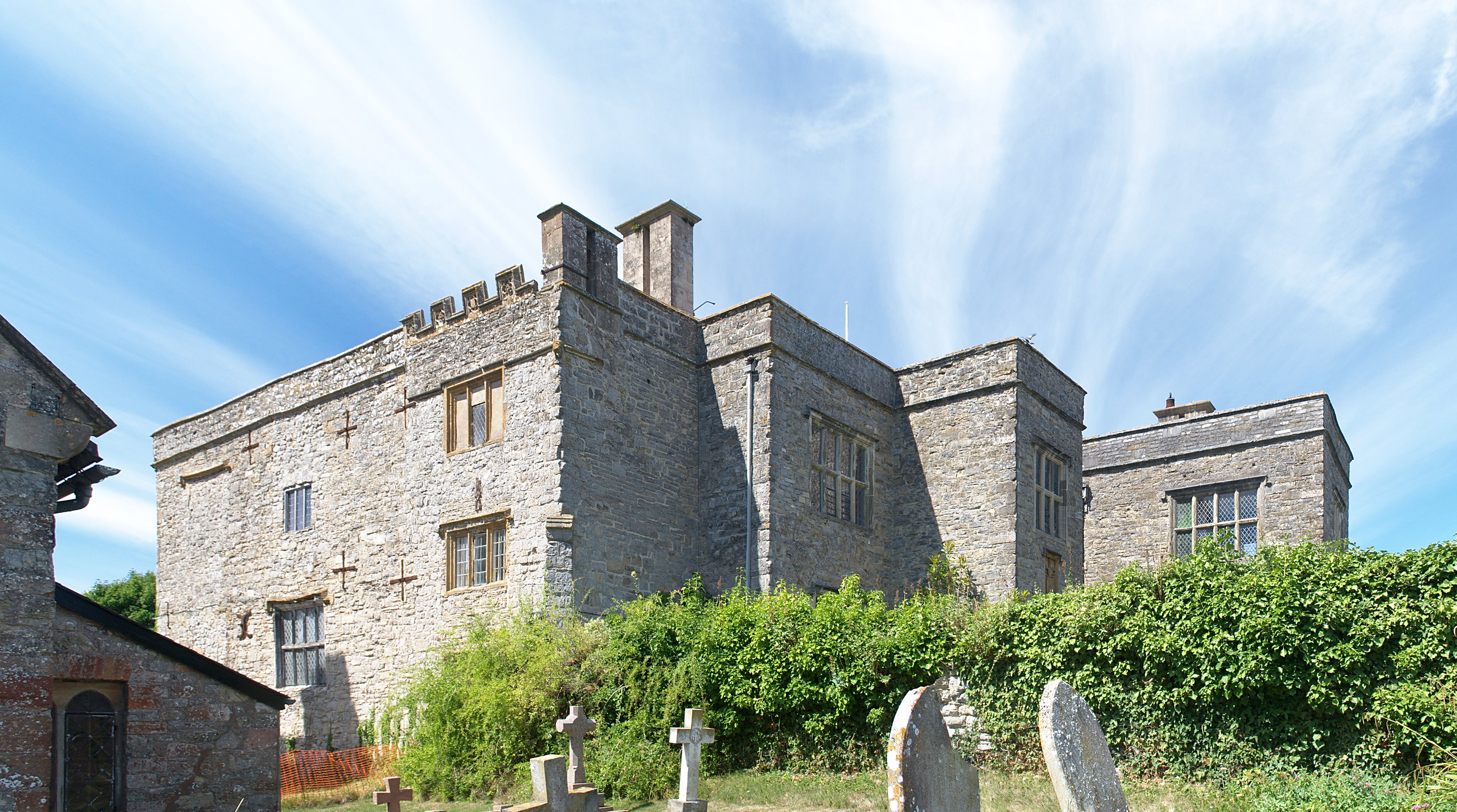

- Location within Somerset
- 51°11′10″N 3°14′18″W
- Location: East Quantoxhead, Somerset, England

History
- Built: 17th century

Listed Building – Grade I
- Official name: Court House
- Designated: 22 May 1969
- Reference no.: 1057409

The Court House in East Quantoxhead, Somerset, England has a medieval tower and other parts of the building which date from the 17th century. It has been designated as a Grade I listed building.

The manor has been held by the Luttrell family, who also owned Dunster Castle, since they acquired it around 1070. Only a tower survives from the medieval manor house which was built around 1400 to replace the one constructed in 1273. Most of the current building was added in the 1620s by George Luttrell and his wife Silvestra Capps. It was then used as a farmhouse until the 20th century when the latest descendants of the Luttrell line lived in it again.

The house includes a hall and gallery with a large kitchen area. The interior of the house is noted for plasterwork friezes. Surrounding the house are gardens of 5 acres (2.0 ha) with 3 acres (1.2 ha) of woodland.

== History ==
It has been owned by the Luttrell family, who also owned Dunster Castle, for many generations since they acquired it around 1070.

The original manor house was constructed around 1273, adjacent to the Church of St Mary. The only remaining section of the medieval house is the four-storey tower with battlements which was dated in a survey during 2003 by Historic England as coming from the late 14th or early 15th century. The rest of the current building was constructed in the 17th century.

By the time George Luttrell inherited Dunster castle in 1571, it was dilapidated, with the family preferring to live at Court House. In the 1620s George Luttrell's first wife and mother of his twelve children died. He remarried to Silvestra Capps who persuaded him to expand the existing building with the addition of the south west wing and new porch. The expansion and improvements which left the house largely in the form it exists today were completed by 1628. After Capps death in 1655 the house was leased as a farmhouse, and although some minor damage was done during the next few hundred years when it was used as a granary the only structural alteration was the addition of a door at wagon level to enable loading and unloading. In the 1860s quarter sessions were held at the house and it has been known as Court House ever since.

In the 20th century the house was returned to residential use and occupied by Lieutenant colonel G.W. Luttrell and his wife. The building was refurbished with masonry repairs and lead re-roofing in 2011 and 2012.

== Architecture ==
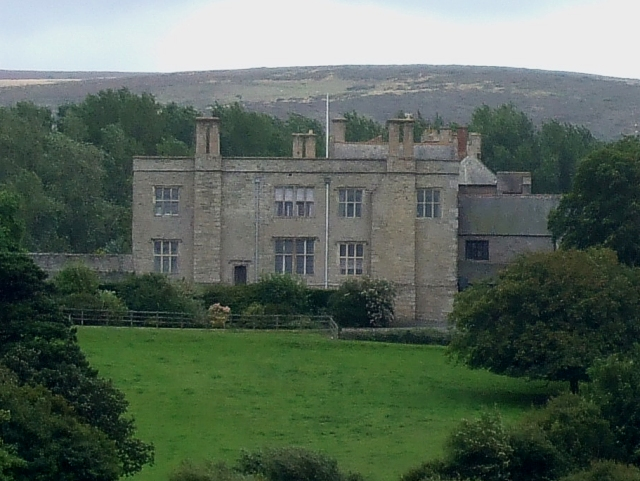
The front of the house

The two-storey house is laid out around a courtyard. The front of the building is Jacobean with the main entry being the two storey porch. The main hall has a gallery above reached via a Tudor oak staircase. The kitchen includes two fireplaces one of which is 12 feet 6 inches (3.81 m) wide and could be used to roast a whole cow. The outer kitchen was used for cider making and contained a large apple press. A small room off the kitchen was used as a cell for drunks awaiting sentence in the court.

The base of the tower includes a court for Cockfights. and other "sporting" memorabilia in the house includes oak staves used for glatting to catch Conger eels with dogs on the nearby beach at Kilve.

The interior of the house is noted for plasterwork friezes. In the hall the fireplace mantel, which dates from 1629, bears the Luttrell coat of arms with soldiers on either side. It was created by two Flemish workers brought in by George Luttrell. They and their descendants stayed in West Somerset and are responsible for the plasterwork in all the great houses in the area, including Court House and Dunster Castle. In most of the rooms of the house the friezes depict biblical scenes. In the drawing room is a representation of Christ with the children, the north bedroom has Christ's entry into Jerusalem, another room depicts Christ's descent from the cross. The scenes are taken from a book Vita, Passio, et Resurrectio Jesu Christi published in Antwerp in 1566.

== Gardens ==
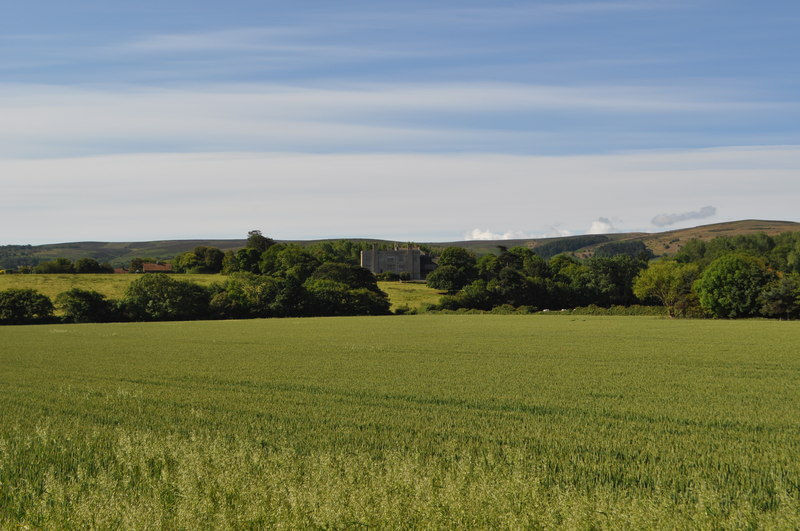
The parkland surrounding the house

The gardens cover an area of 5 acres (2.0 ha) with 3 acres (1.2 ha) of woodland. The current gardens were laid out in the 1950s, using acidic soil to create a Cornish garden with camellias, rhododendrons, magnolias and pale-flowered hydrangeas, herbaceous borders and a traditional kitchen garden.

== See also ==
- Grade I listed buildings in West Somerset
