= Church of St Peter, Williton =

Church in Somerset, England

Church of St Peter
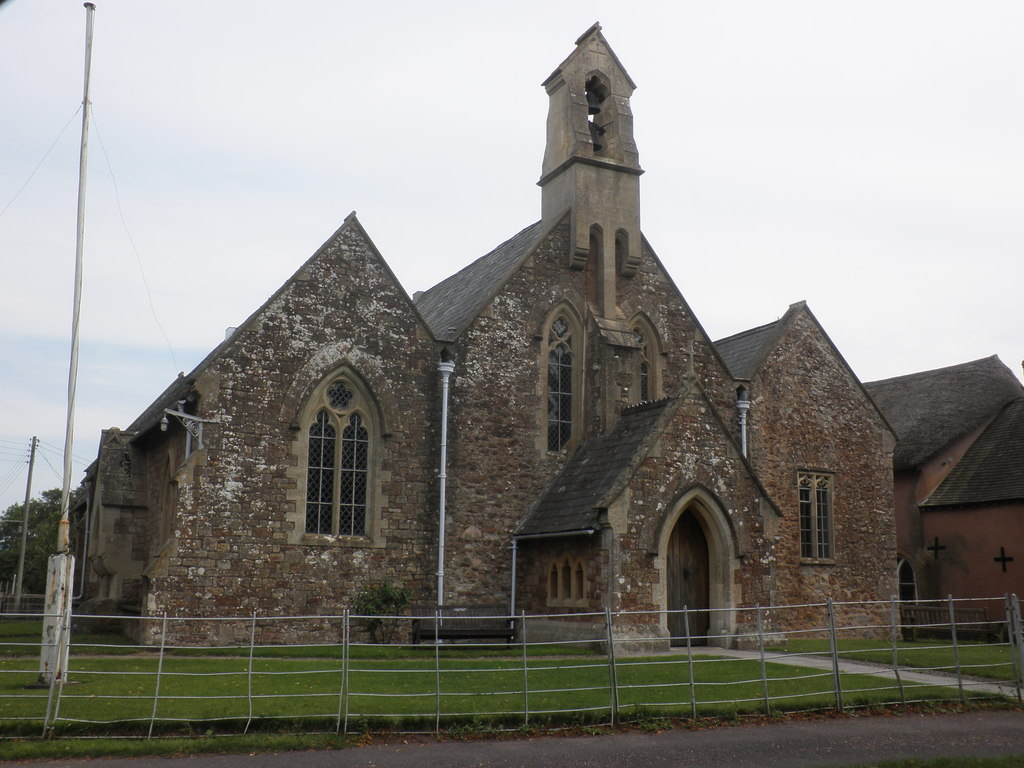

- Location within Somerset
- 51°07′05″N 3°24′54″W
- Location: Williton, Somerset, England

Listed Building – Grade II*
- Designated: 22 May 1969
- Reference no.: 1174922

The Anglican Church of St Peter in Williton in the English county of Somerset is recorded in the National Heritage List for England as a designated Grade II* listed building.

The earliest church on the site may have been the private chapel of a Saxon royal manor. In the 12th century Reginald Fitzurse was the Lord of the manor when he was one of the four knights who murdered Thomas Becket. It was then passed to his brother and the Knights Templar. The church was largely rebuilt in the 16th century and again in the 1850s as part of an extensive Victorian restoration.

For many years St Peter's was a chapel of ease of Church of St Decuman, Watchet until 1889 when it became a separate parish. The parish is now part of the benefice of Watchet and Williton within the archdeaconry of Taunton.

== History ==
The date of the origin of St Peter's Church in Bridge Street is uncertain but it may have started as the private chapel of a Saxon royal manor site. The status of the Church changed dramatically in 1170 when The Lord of the manor, Sir Reginald Fitzurse, became one of the murderers of St Thomas a Becket. Following the murder the ownership of part the manor passed to Reginald's brother Robert and the other part to the Knights Templar. The historian John Collinson records that Robert rebuilt the chapel of Williton implying that the Saxon chapel was in ruins. The Liber Albus manuscripts in Wells Cathedral library show Robert gave to the Church of St Decuman, Watchet some important property and certain rights in the chapel making St Peter's a daughter church of Watchet and became known as a chapel of ease.

== Current building ==
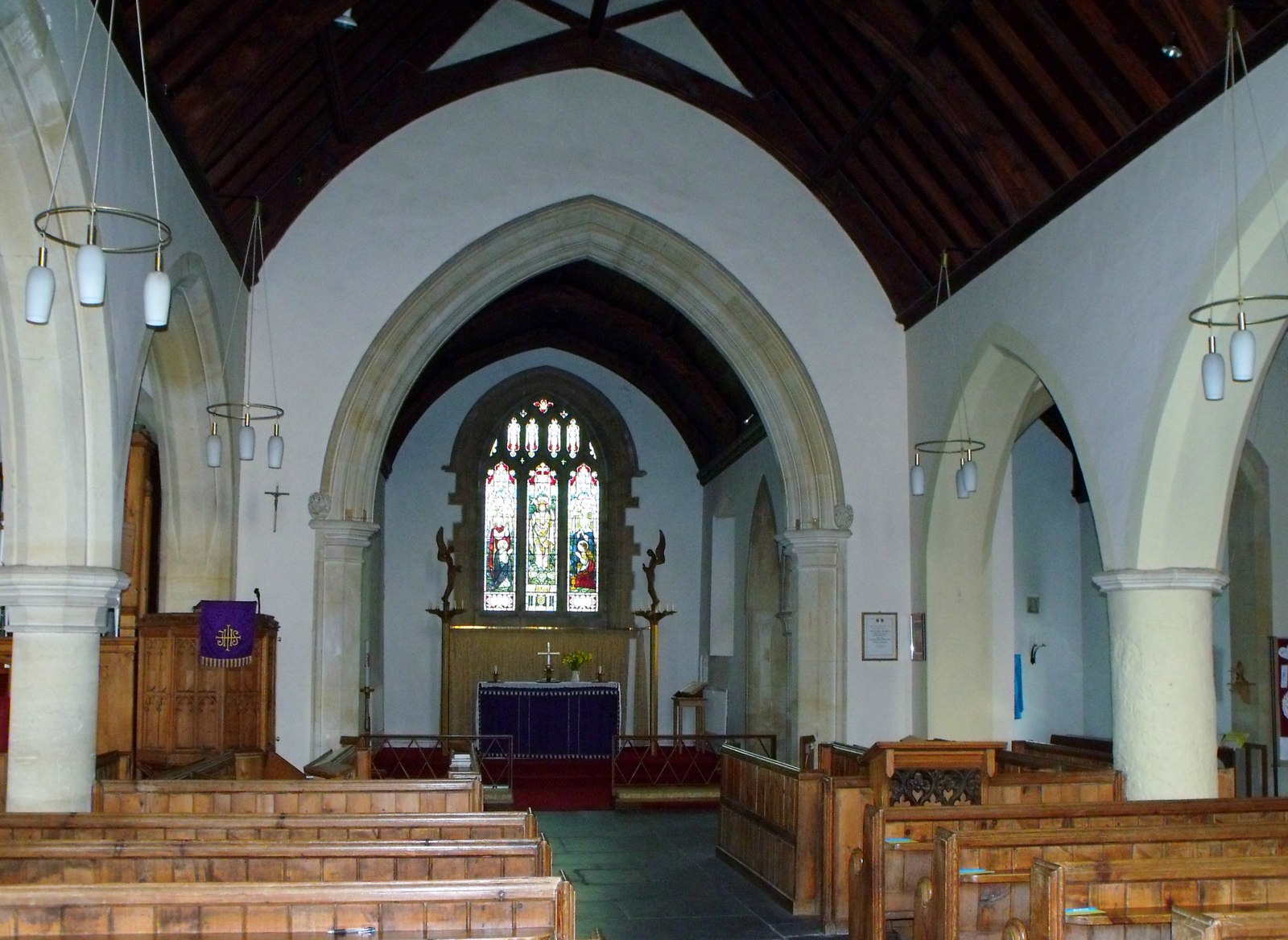
The nave

Some of the fabric of the current building is from the 16th century. Further work was undertaken in the 17th century when the church was known as All Saints. In 1810 a south extension was built, although the Elizabethan windows were relocated and reused in the south wall. The church fell into a state of disrepair and in 1856 suffered a Victorian restoration under the architect Charles Edmund Giles. The priest responsible for the rebuilding and restoration of 1856 to 1859, Samuel Heathcote (at the Church 1854 to 1906), was appointed Perpetual curate but was signing the registers as Vicar from 21 November 1889 showing that Williton had become a parish separate from Watchet. The church had a small spire until it was damaged during a storm after which the bells were housed until a wooden bellcote until a new stone one was built in 1896.

The church is built of red sandstone with Bath stone dressings. It now has a four- bay nave with north and south aisles and a chancel with a barrel vault roof.

== Interior ==
The interior of the church includes a wooden board listing the names of 23 people from the parish who died in World War I and 13 in World War II.

There is a piscina from the 15th century. The alabaster font dates from 1666 and the poor box from 1680.

== Churchyard ==
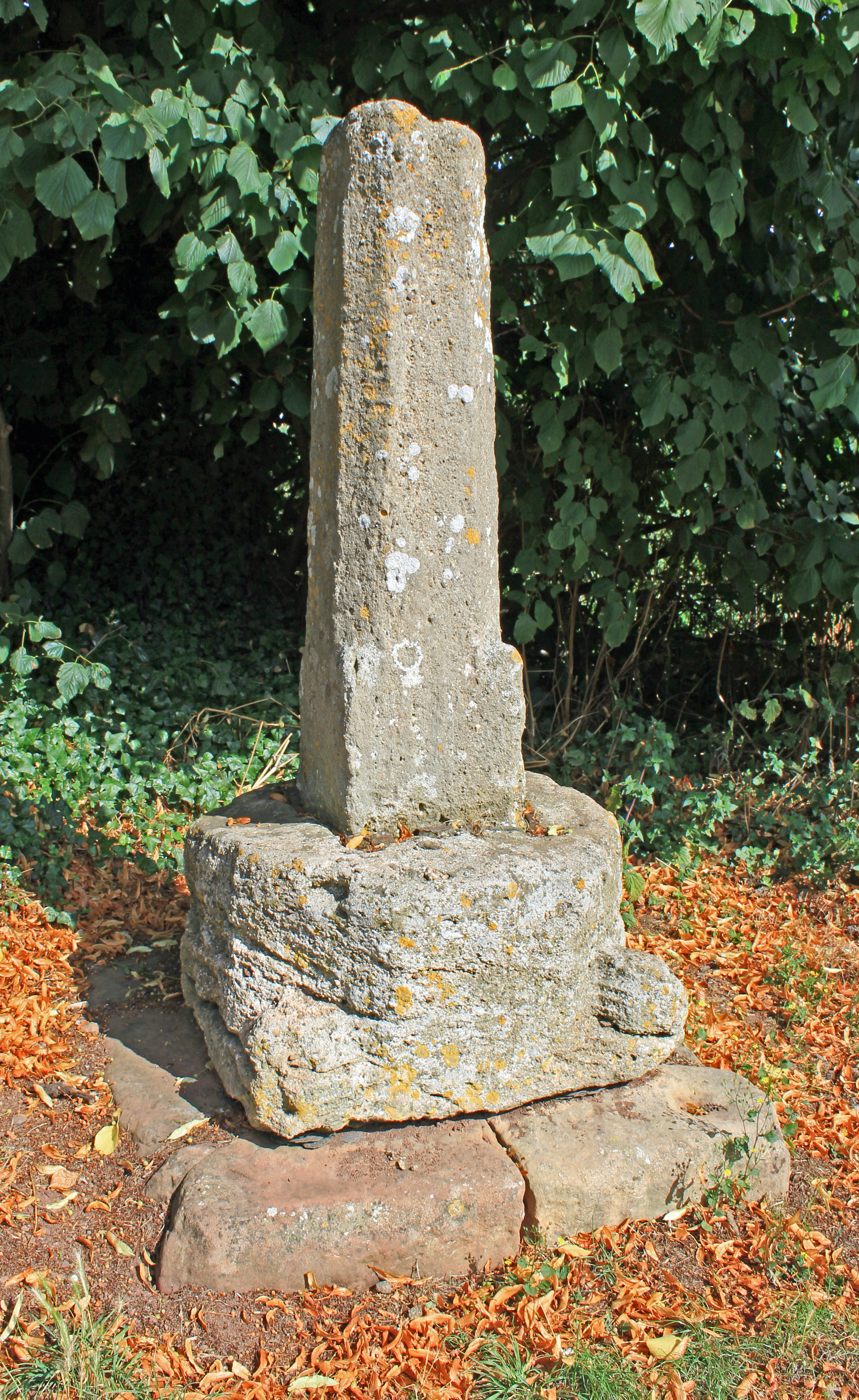
Base of churchyard cross

Within the churchyard is a red sandstone base of a cross dating from the late 13th century. It is a Grade II* listed building and ancient monument.

== See also ==
- List of ecclesiastical parishes in the Diocese of Bath and Wells
