= Lady of St Kilda =

British schooner

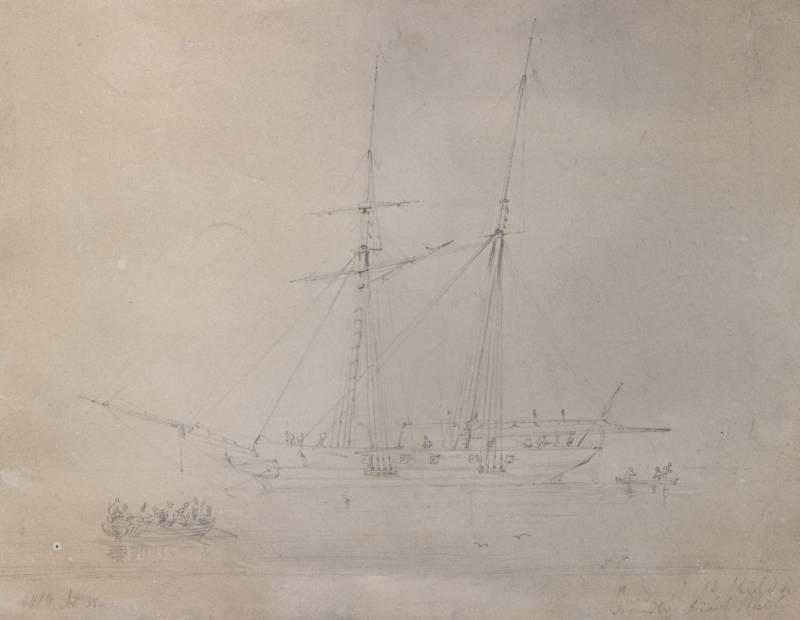
- Sketch of the Lady of St Kilda by Jno. R. Browning c 1890

History

United Kingdom
- Name: Lady of St Kilda
- Owner: Sir Thomas Dyke Acland, 10th Baronet
- Builder: Robert Newman
- Launched: 1834 at Dartmouth, Devon, England
- Fate: Wrecked November 1844

General characteristics
- Tonnage: 139 tons

The Lady of St Kilda was a schooner which served from 1834 before being shipwrecked off Tahiti shortly after 1843.

It is notable for its cultural importance to Melbourne, Australia, where it was moored in the 1840s. Several places in bayside Melbourne, including the suburb of St Kilda, and the former municipality the City of St Kilda (now part of the City of Port Phillip) take its name from the ship, its owner and captain.

== History ==
The schooner was bought by Sir Thomas Dyke Acland, a member of a prominent British political family in 1834. Built in Dartmouth, Devon, England to carry fruit from the Mediterranean to London it was named Lady of St Kilda after the island of St Kilda in the Outer Hebrides of Scotland to commemorate a visit to the island by his wife, Lydia, in 1812.

Thomas Acland sold the vessel in 1840 to Jonathan Cundy Pope of Plymouth. The vessel was again used as a trading vessel and sailed for Port Phillip Bay in Melbourne in February 1841. The vessel was usually moored off the foreshore, which was soon known as "the St. Kilda foreshore."

In July 1842, the Lady of St Kilda sailed for Canton (now Guangzhou). The vessel was sold in Tahiti for £1,200 in 1844. In November 1844, she was wrecked on a coral reef in Tahiti.

== Legacy ==
The ship's legacy includes the naming of the town (and later city) St Kilda by Superintendent (later Lieutenant-Governor) Charles Joseph La Trobe.

One of the town's main streets, Acland Street, was named after the former owner Sir Thomas Dyke Acland.

There is a mural of the Lady of St Kilda on the Sandringham railway line overpass at Balaclava station commissioned by the City of Port Phillip. The Lady of St Kilda sculpture on the Carlisle Street Bridge was commissioned by the St Kilda Council in 1993 as a result of a competition and the mural was completed on 29 November 1993. The artist who designed the sculpture was Alex Nemirovsky. His father, Ruv Nemirovsky, a sculptor, helped him design and mould the metal sculptures in a factory and they were then brought to St Kilda. Architects Kirsten and Eric Hoak made the frames for the sculptures to fit on the bridge. The budget was tight and Alex gratefully received the aid of his brother-in-law, Constantine Kozelsky, who helped weld and cut the metal in the workshop. He was also lucky to have sponsorship from Dulux Paints. A large number of volunteers helped him and the final construction on the railway bridge was completed by ten workmen taking two nights for each side of the bridge, which incidentally had to be done in the dead of night after the trains stopped running. The sculpture was restored by the City of Port Phillip in 2014.

A scale model of the Lady of St Kilda by retired boatbuilder John MacAulay is now exhibited in the Kilda Cruises Centre on the Isle of Harris in Scotland. A book describing her complete history entitled 'Lady of St Kilda' by John M MacAulay is now available from Amazon and other booksellers.

Despite its huge popularity, a 2006 art installation by a different artist, depicting a mock shipwreck at St Kilda Main Beach was later disassembled by the City of Port Phillip because of public safety concerns despite calls to keep it.

The bell from the Lady of St Kilda hangs over the doorway of the Chapel of St Leonard, Tivington in Somerset, England.

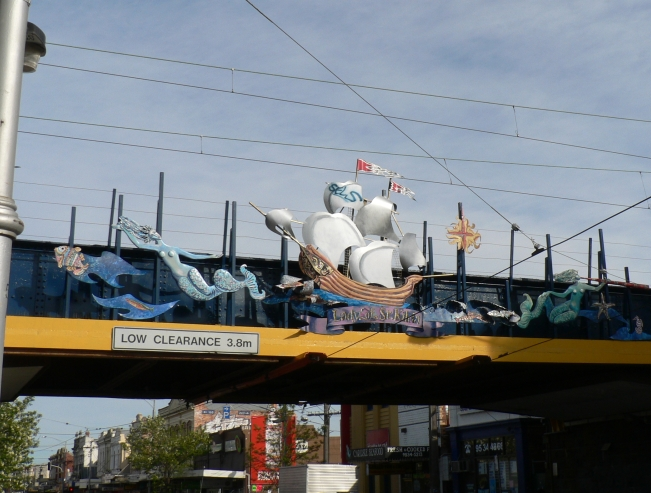
Lady of St Kilda mural on the railway overpass over the main shopping strip on Carlisle Street, Balaclava

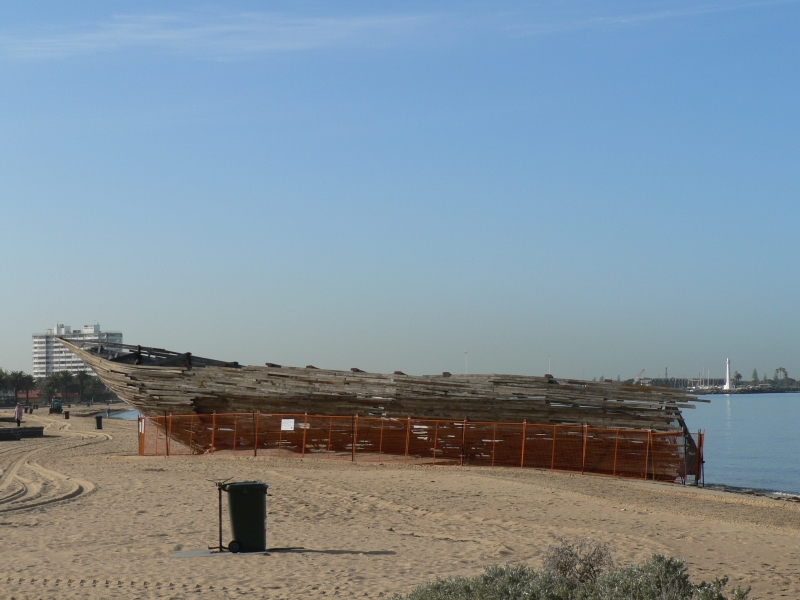
Lady of St Kilda sculpture at St Kilda main beach (now removed)

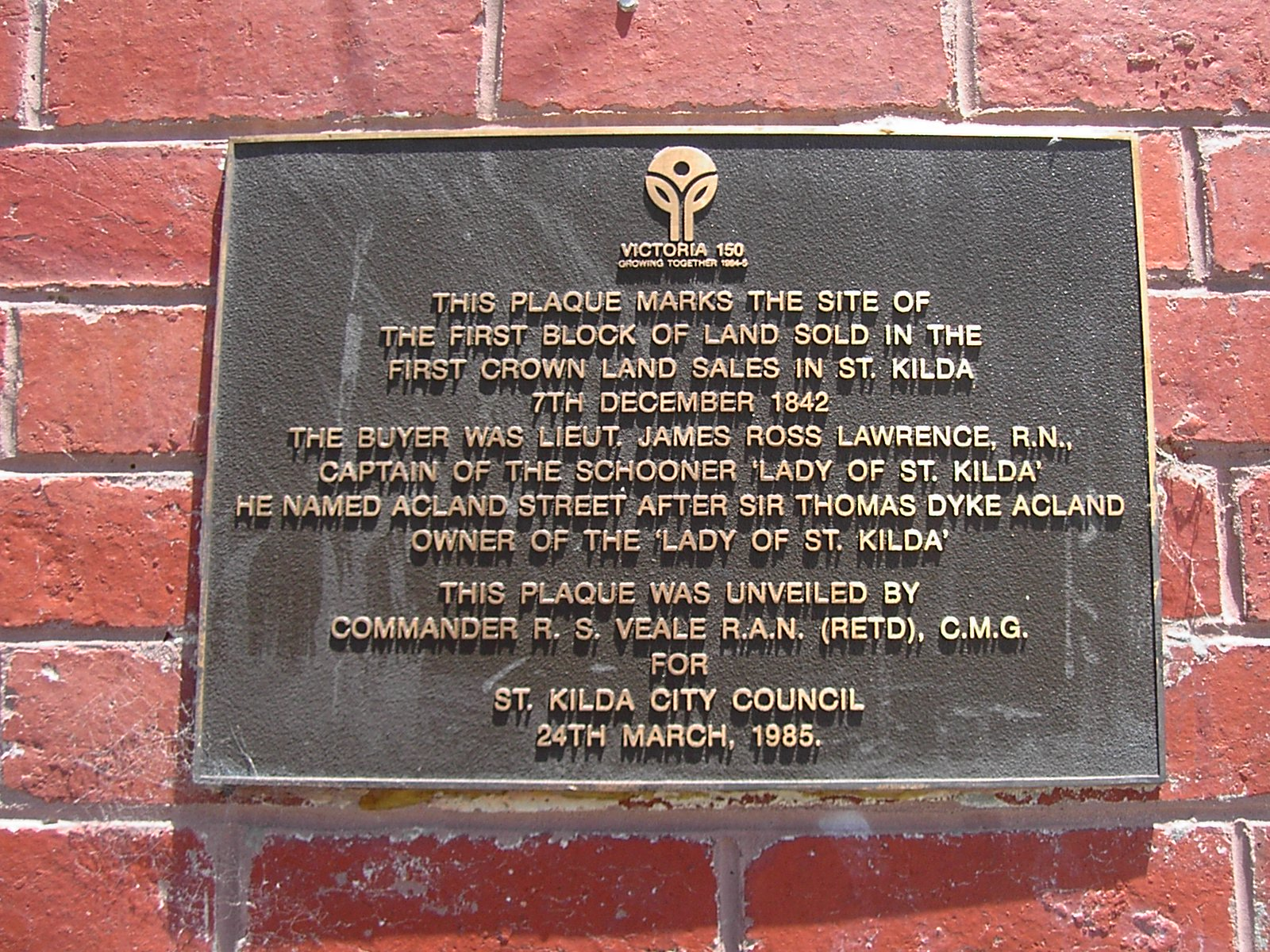
Memorial plaque to first Crown land sale in St Kilda to Lieut James Ross Lawrence, Captain of the schooner Lady of St Kilda.
