= St Andrew's Church, Minehead =

Church in Somerset, England

St Andrew's Church
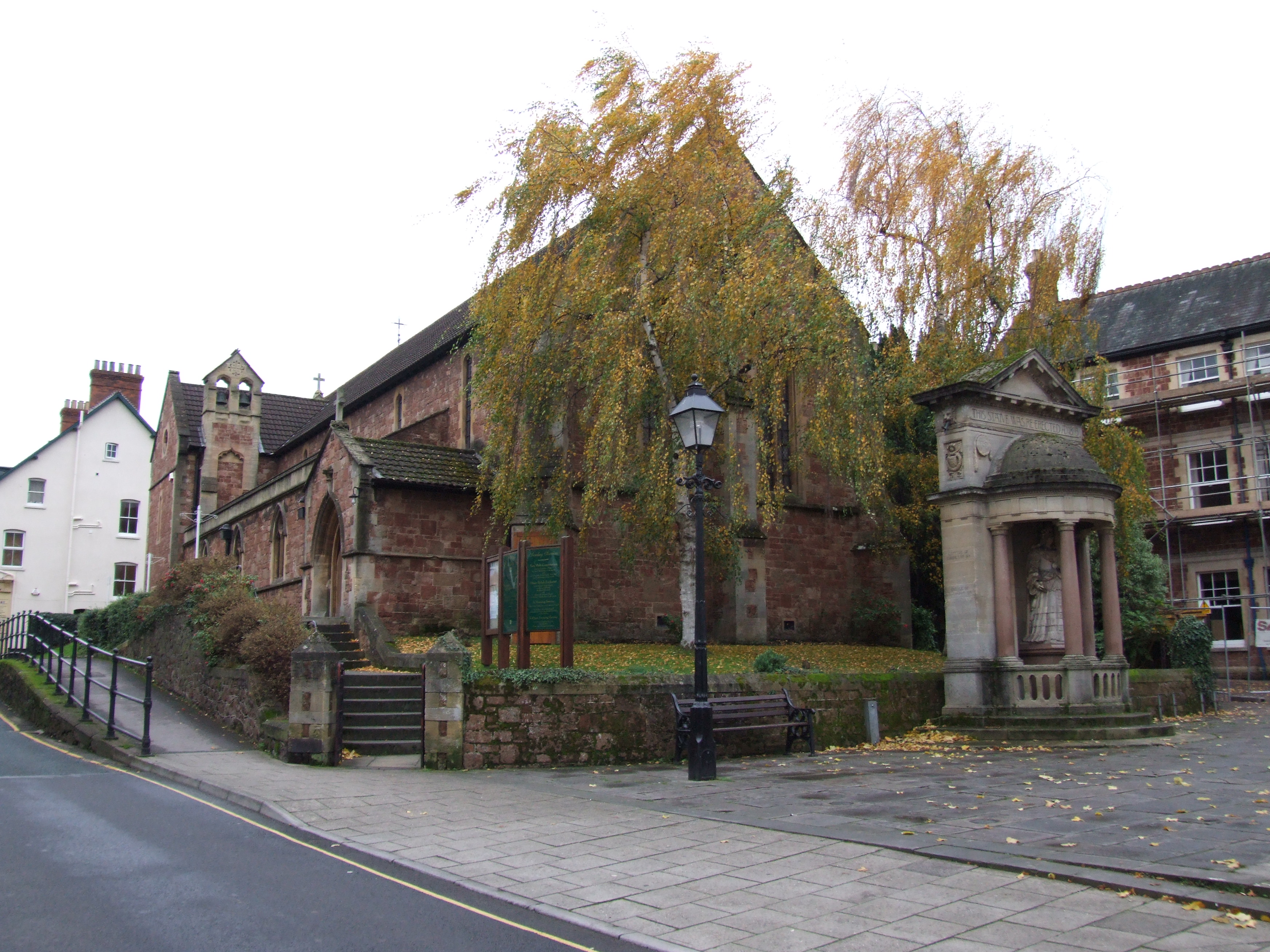

Religion
- Affiliation: Church of England
- Ecclesiastical or organizational status: Active
- Year consecrated: 1880

Location
- Location: Minehead, Somerset, England
- Interactive map of St Andrew's Church
- Coordinates: 51.2051°N 3.4789°W

Architecture
- Architect: George Edmund Street
- Type: Church

St Andrew's Church is a Church of England church in Minehead, Somerset, England. Designed by George Edmund Street, it was built in 1877–80 and has been a Grade II* listed building since 1976. The walls, gate piers and gates to the church have been Grade II listed since 1994.

== History ==
St Andrew's was built as a chapel of ease to the parish church of St Michael's. A new church was seen as necessary to serve the lower region of the town, particularly the elderly and sick who struggled to manage the steep journey up to the parish church. Furthermore, additional church accommodation was required to serve the increasing number of residents in Minehead, while the town was also attracting more visitors from its growing reputation as a seaside resort.

The need for a new church was recognised by Mrs. Charlotte Ann F. Luttrell, wife of Minehead's vicar (Rev. A. H. F. Luttrell), who had St Andrew's built at her own expense, in memory of her cousin, the late George Jeremy of Leacombe House, Axminster. Mrs. Luttrell spent approximately £4,000-£5,000 on the church, created an endowment of £1,000 and provided £200 towards a repairs fund. A plot of land was gifted by George Fownes Luttrell of Dunster Castle, who also provided the bricks and building stone. The plans for the church were drawn up George Edmund Street of London.

The foundation stone was laid by Master Alexander Collingwood Fownes Luttrell, the eldest son of Captain John F. Luttrell of the Royal Navy, on 22 August 1877. The contractor for its construction was Messrs. John Pearse and Son of Minehead, with Mr. C. H. Samson of Dunster as clerk of the works. The completed church was consecrated by the Bishop of Bath and Wells, the Right Rev. Lord Arthur Hervey, on 26 August 1880.

== Architecture ==
St Andrew's is built of red sandstone sourced from Alcombe quarries, with dressings of Doulting stone, in the Decorated style. It was designed to accommodate 324 persons and is made up of a three-bay nave, north and south aisles, chancel, vestry with organ loft, north porch and a bell-turret. The church's intended tower was never built.

The open-timbered roofs of the nave and chancel were carved from pitch pine, as was the seating of the nave and aisles. Oak was used for the screen and ceilings of the vestry and organ loft. The chancel was paved with encaustic tiles supplied by Messrs. William Godwin of Hereford. The church has a five-light east window, and a rose and two two-light windows on the west side. All windows were glazed with white cathedral glass. The pulpit, lectern, reading desk and font cover were made of oak, and the octagonal font of Doulting stone. The corbels, finials and terminals were carved by Harry Hems of Exeter, the seating by Messrs. Baker and Son of Bristol and the ironwork by Mr. Leaver of Maidenhead. The church's two bells were made by Messrs. John Taylor & Co of Loughborough.

A harmonium was initially used at the church until it received its organ in 1881, which was presented by H. A. Bosanquet and built by Messrs J. W. Walker & Sons Ltd of London. A memorial was added to an eastern window in 1888 in memory of Mrs. Luttrell who died the previous year. It was designed and executed by Charles Eamer Kempe of London. A lectern of wrought-iron and brass was added to the church in 1903. The church's meeting rooms, kitchen and toilets were all built in 2004.
