= Statue of Queen Anne, Minehead =

Statue in Minehead, Somerset, England

Statue of Queen Anne
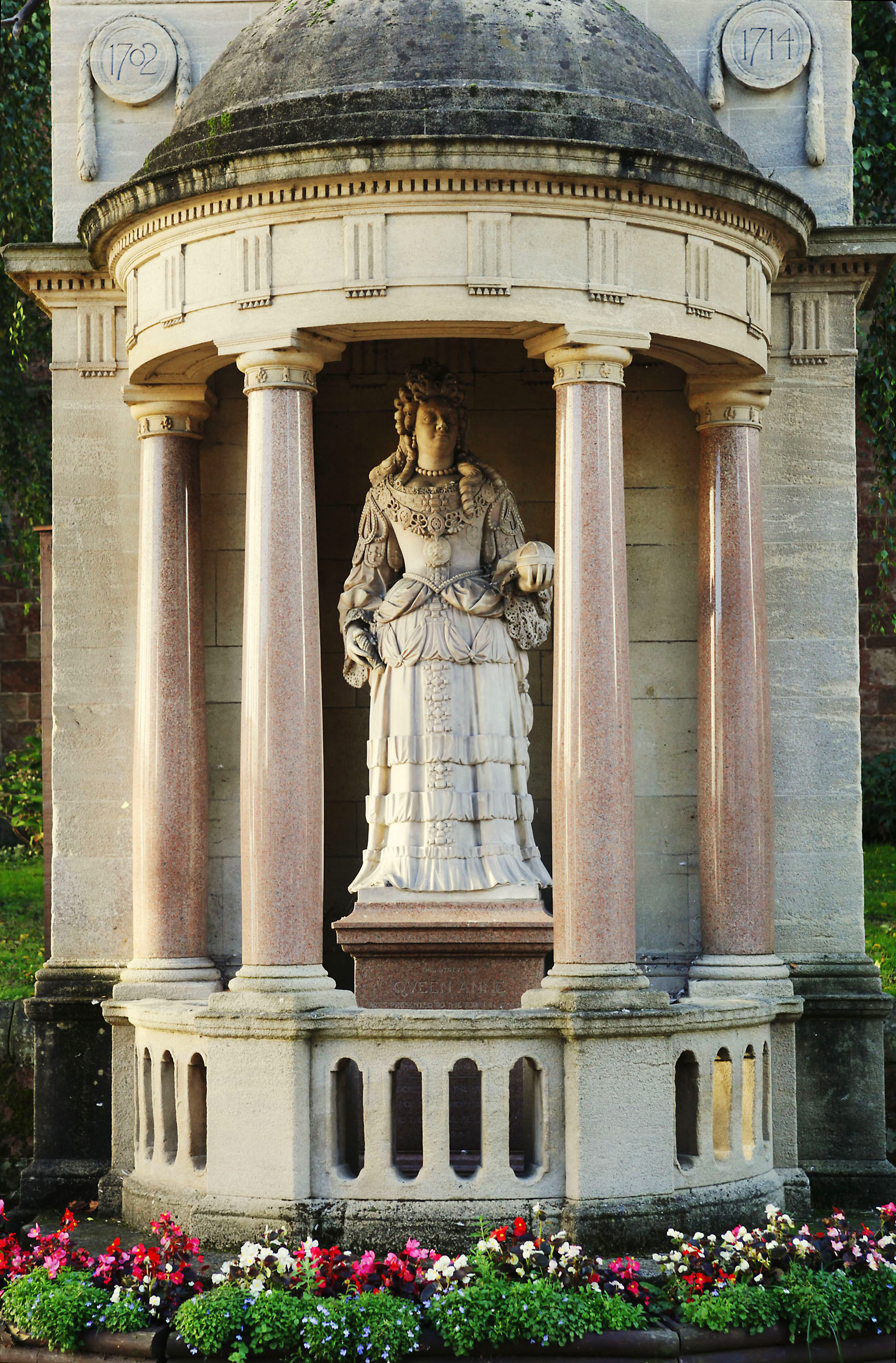

- Location within Somerset
- 51.2053°N 3.479°W
- Location: Minehead, Somerset, England

History
- Built: 1719

Listed Building – Grade II*
- Official name: Statue of Queen Anne
- Designated: 4 July 1952
- Reference no.: 1207015

The Statue of Queen Anne in Minehead, Somerset, England was built in 1719. It is a Grade II* listed building.

== History ==
The statue depicts Queen Anne in full court dress. It was designed by Francis Bird, who had previously made a sculpture of the queen for St Paul's Cathedral, after a commission by Sir Jacob Bancks the local member of parliament for Minehead. Statues of the queen were a "fashionable ornament" during her reign.

It was removed from its original site in St Michael's Church during restoration work in 1880. It was to have been placed in the town hall, but following a public subscription for the canopy it was re-erected at its current site in 1893.

== Architecture ==
The statue is made of alabaster. The pedestal and canopy which were added by H. Dare Bryan in 1893 are of Carrara marble. Above the statue is a dentilled pediment and cornice
