= Church of St Andrew, Withypool =

Church in Withypool, Somerset, UK

Church of St Andrew
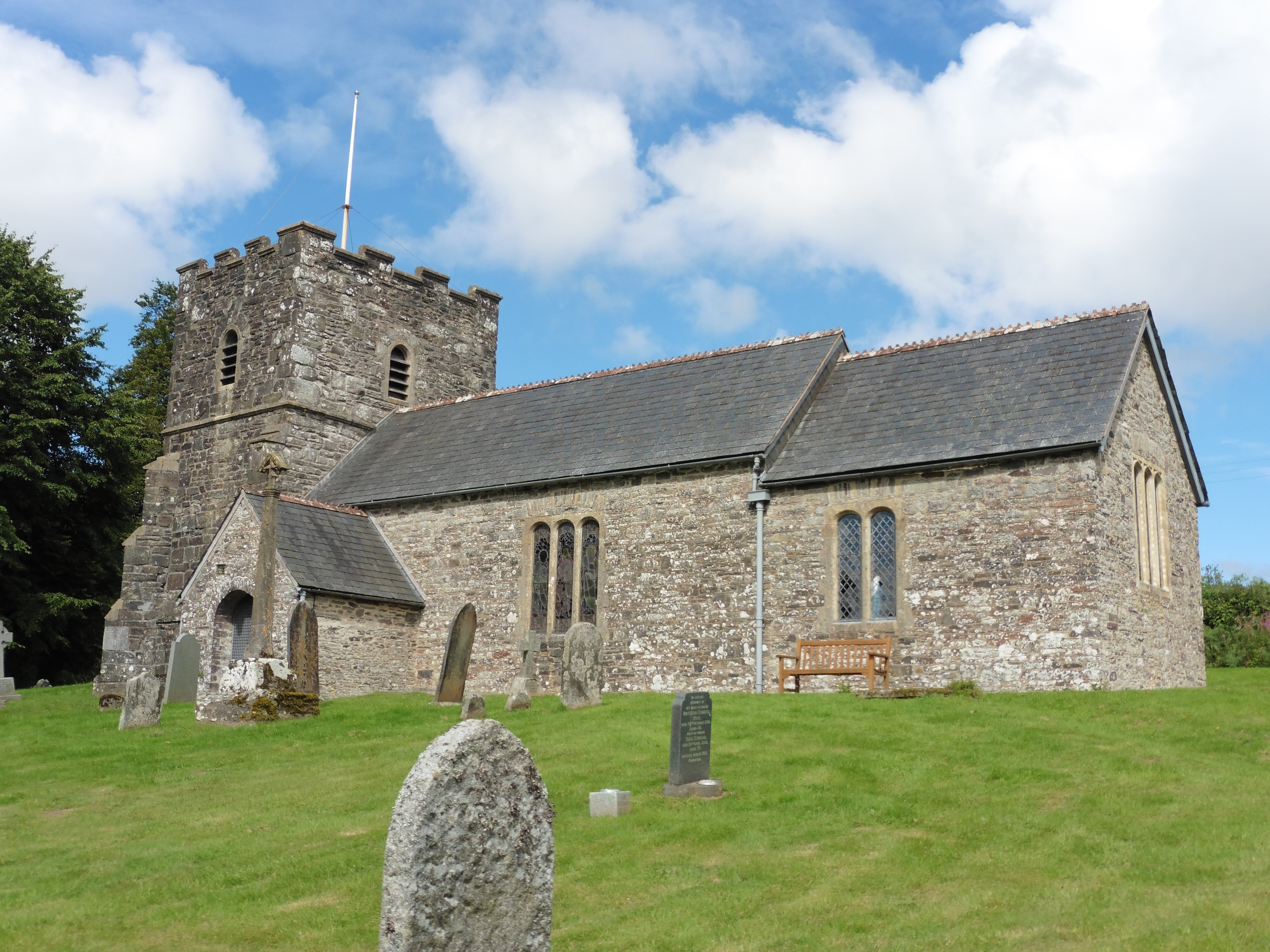

- Location within Somerset
- 51.108°N 3.6494°W
- Location: Withypool, Somerset, England

History
- Built: Late medieval period

Listed Building – Grade II*
- Official name: Church of St Andrew
- Designated: 6 April 1959
- Reference no.: 1057968

The Anglican Church of St Andrew in Withypool, Somerset, England was built in late medieval period. It is a Grade II* listed building.

== History ==
The church was built in the Middle Ages but the tower was rebuilt in the early 17th century. A Victorian restoration was carried out in 1887 with further rebuilding in 1902.

The parish is part of the Exmoor benefice within the Diocese of Bath and Wells.

== Architecture ==
The stone building has slate roofs. It consists of a three-bay nave and a north aisle. The two-stage tower is supported by diagonal buttresses. Partly set into the northwest buttress is a medieval carved stone cross.

Within the church is a Norman font. The white stone chalice-shaped font has a scalloped bowl on a cylindrical shaft.

== See also ==
- List of ecclesiastical parishes in the Diocese of Bath and Wells
