= Stoke Pero Church =

Church in Somerset, England

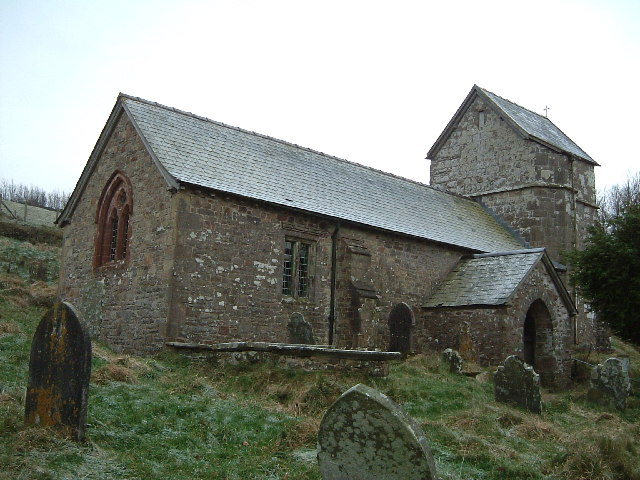

- Location within Somerset
- 51.1797°N 3.6061°W
- Location: Stoke Pero, Somerset, England

History
- Built: 13th century

Listed Building – Grade II*
- Official name: Stoke Pero Church
- Designated: 22 May 1969
- Reference no.: 1174803

Stoke Pero Church in Stoke Pero, Somerset, England was built in the 13th century. It is a Grade II* listed building. Standing 1,013 feet (309 meters) above sea level, it is the highest church on Exmoor.

== History ==
The church has no known dedication to any saint, however an inscription on one of the three bells suggests it may have been dedicated to Saint Barbara.

The tower dates from the 13th century. The rest of the church was largely rebuilt in 1897 by Sir Thomas Dyke Acland, 12th Baronet. It is likely that there was a church on the site long before the 13th century.

The list of rectors goes back to 1242.

Occasional services are held at the church by the parish of Porlock with Stoke Pero which is within the Diocese of Bath and Wells.

== Architecture ==
The stone building has slate roofs. It consists of a three-bay nave and chancel with a porch to the north. The tower is supported by diagonal buttresses and has a stair turret. It has no electricity supply and is lit by candles and warmed by fuel-stoves.

Inside the church is a baluster font.

== See also ==
- List of ecclesiastical parishes in the Diocese of Bath and Wells
