= St Peter's Church, Treborough =

Church in Treborough, Somerset, UK

St Peter's Church
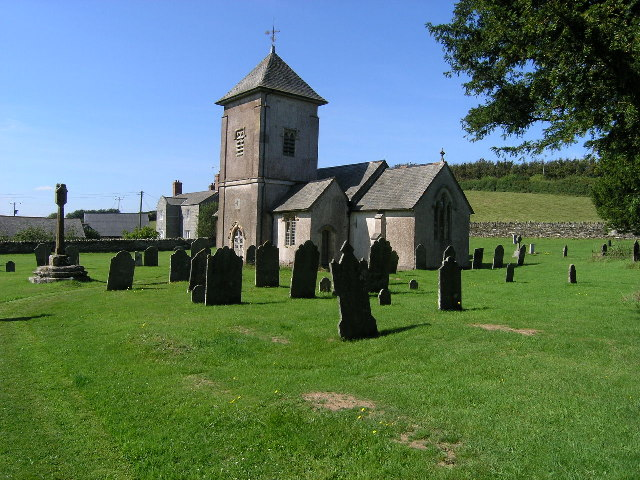

- Location within Somerset
- 51°07′5″N 3°24′53″W
- Location: Treborough, Somerset, England

Listed Building – Grade II*
- Official name: Church of St Peter
- Designated: 22 May 1969
- Reference no.: 1295414

Scheduled monument
- Official name: Cross in the churchyard of St Peter's Church
- Designated: 5 July 2002
- Reference no.: 1020690

The Anglican St Peter's Church at Treborough within the English county of Somerset dates from the 14th century. It is a Grade II* listed building.

Although some of the fabric of the building from the 14th century, the rest was constructed in the late 15th and early 16th centuries. It was restored in the 19th century when the two-stage tower received a new roof. The octagonal font dates from the 15th century.

In the churchyard is a medieval cross with a stone shaft on an octagonal base with three octagonal steps. The head of the cross with a figure of St Peter is a 19th-century addition.

The parish is part of the benefice of Old Cleeve, Leighland and Treborough within the archdeaconry of Taunton.

== See also ==
- List of ecclesiastical parishes in the Diocese of Bath and Wells
