= Church of St Mary Magdelene, Exford =

15th-century Anglican church in Somerset, England

Church of St Mary Magdelene
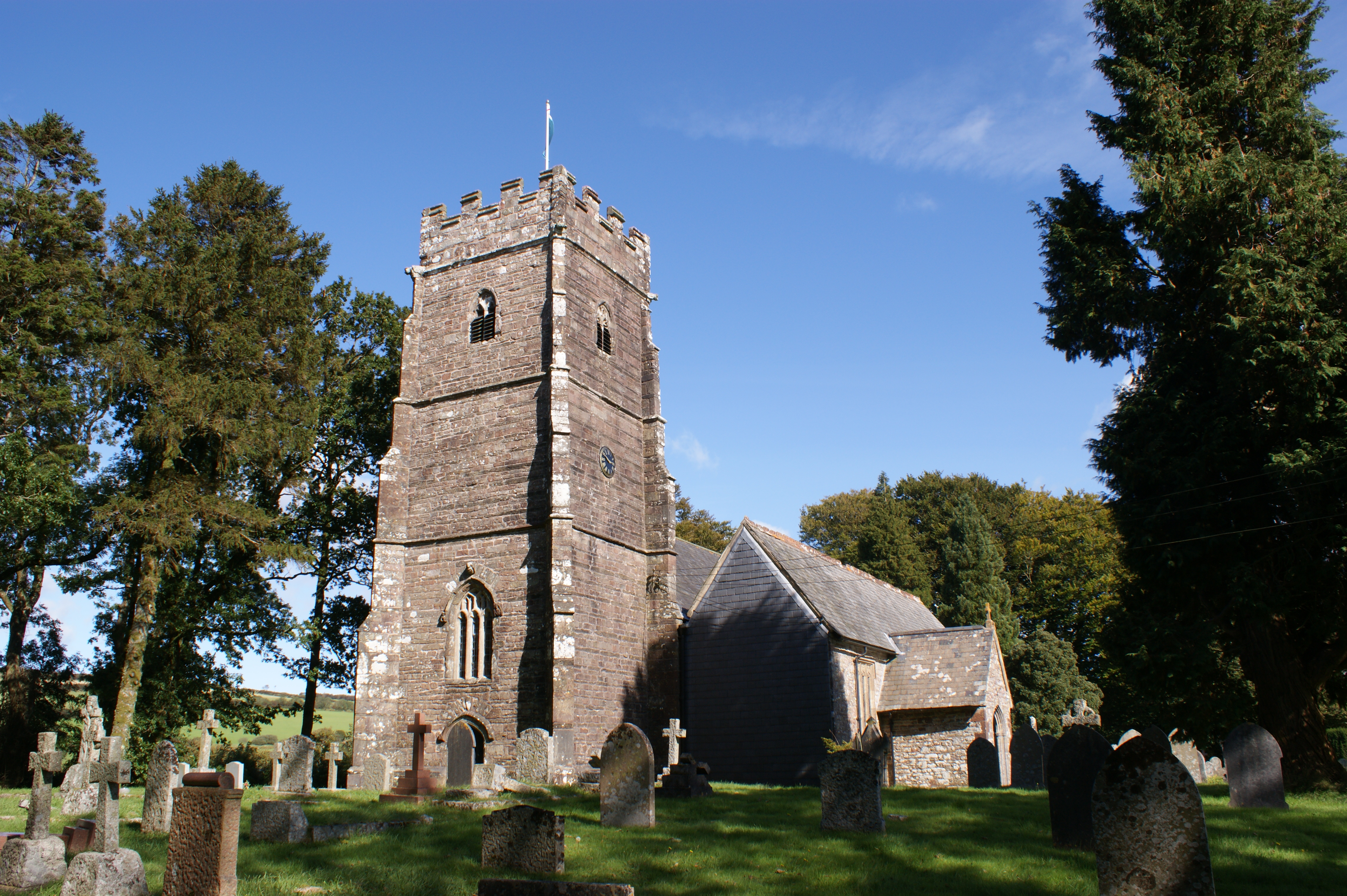

- Location within Somerset
- 51.1344°N 3.6341°W
- Location: Exford, Somerset, England

History
- Built: 15th century

Listed Building – Grade II*
- Official name: Church of St Mary Magdelene
- Designated: 6 April 1969
- Reference no.: 1057319

The Anglican Church of St Mary Magdelene in Exford, Somerset, England, was built in the 15th century. It is a Grade II* listed building.

== History ==
Nothing remains of the original church on the site which may have existed at the time of the Norman Conquest.

The tower survives from the mid 15th century and the south aisle from 1532 to 1542. A Victorian restoration in 1867 included the rebuilding of the nave and chancel when the porch was added.

The church was dedicated to St Salvyn, who is represented in the stained glass alongside St Francis and St George.

The parish is part of the Exmoor benefice within the Diocese of Bath and Wells.

== Architecture ==
The red sandstone building has slate roofs. It consists of a three-bay nave, four-bay south aisle with porch and a chancel. The three-stage west tower is supported by diagonal buttresses. It holds six bells the oldest of which cast by George Purdue in 1603.

The interior has a Victorian stone reredos with a panelled screen from 1923 forming the vestry. The fan-vaulted screen with the remains of friezes was originally made for St Audries Church in West Quantoxhead in the 15th century and moved to Exford and reassembled in 1929. The parish chest is from 1772. The organ was designed by Ninian Comper and presented to the church in 1924.

In the churchyard there is the stump of a late 13th century stone cross.

== See also ==
- List of ecclesiastical parishes in the Diocese of Bath and Wells
