= St Peter's Church, Exton =

Church in Somerset, England

St Peter's Church
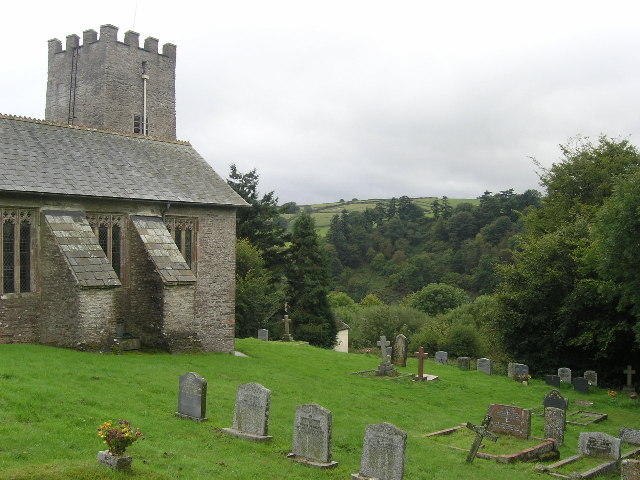

- Location within Somerset
- 51°05′33″N 3°32′07″W
- Location: Exton, Somerset, England

Listed Building – Grade II*
- Official name: Church of St Peter
- Designated: 6 April 1959
- Reference no.: 1296311

Scheduled monument
- Official name: Cross in the churchyard of St Peter's Church
- Designated: 12 November 2003
- Reference no.: 1021156

The Anglican St Peter's Church at Exton within the English county of Somerset has a 13th-century tower and 15th century aisle. It is a Grade II* listed building.

Some of the original Norman stonework can still be identified in the nave. The rest of the building has been reconstructed with the crenellated two-stage tower being added in the 13th century and the aisle in the 15th. It was restored and the chancel rebuilt in 1876.

In the churchyard is a 14th-century cross with a tapering octagonal stone shaft. The upper part of the shaft was restored in 1875.

The parish is within the Exmoor benefice and the archdeaconry of Taunton.

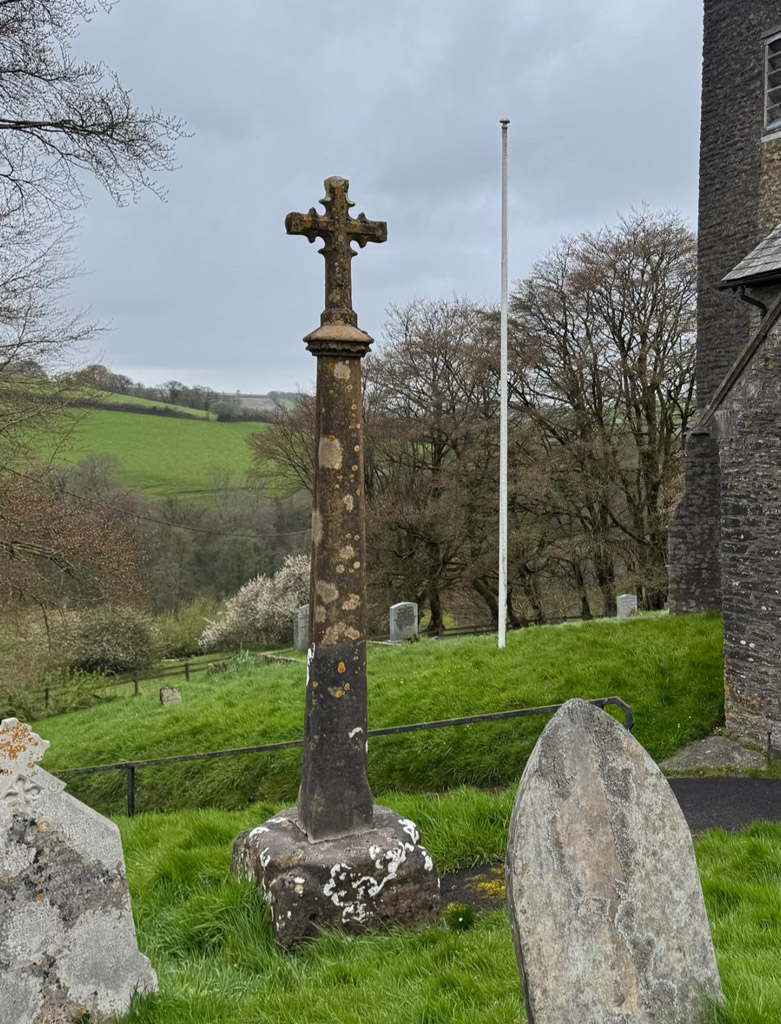
Medieval churchyard cross, St Peter's Exton

== See also ==
- List of ecclesiastical parishes in the Diocese of Bath and Wells
