= Lynch Chapel of Ease =

Church in Somerset, England

Lynch Chapel Of Ease
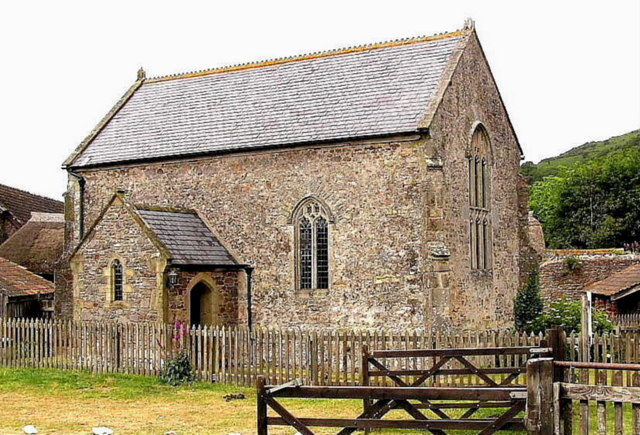

- Location within Somerset
- 51.2174°N 3.5759°W
- Type: Chapel
- Location: West Lynch, Selworthy, Somerset, England

History
- Built: c. 1530

Listed Building – Grade II*
- Official name: Lynch Chapel Of Ease
- Designated: 22 May 1969
- Reference no.: 1057997

The Anglican Lynch Chapel Of Ease in West Lynch, Selworthy, Somerset, England was built around 1530. It is a Grade II* listed building.

== History ==
The chapel was built around 1503 and was used by monks from Athelney Abbey but then became a private chapel for use by the lord of the nearby manor house.

The building was used as a store for the nearby farm but was returned to religious use in the 1880s by Thomas Dyke Acland. In 1880 it was restored and the addition of a porch completed around 1904 in memory of Henry Goddard.

The parish of Selworthy is within the Porlock and Porlock Weir benefice within the Diocese of Bath and Wells.

== Architecture ==
The stone building is supported by diagonal buttresses and has a slate roof. It has a ribbed open wagon roof.
