= Chapel Cleeve Manor =

Historic house in Somerset, England

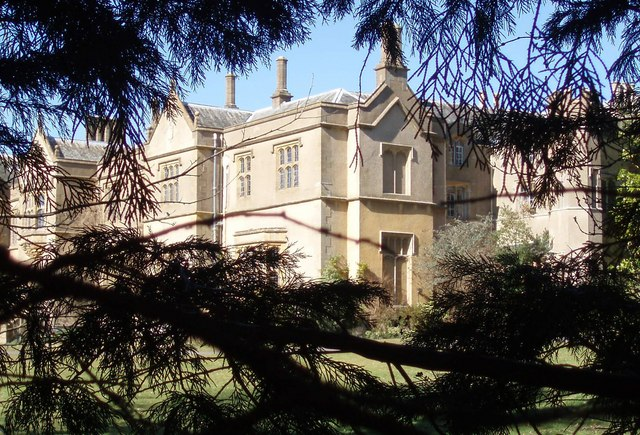

- Location within Somerset
- 51°10′41″N 3°22′52″W
- Location: Chapel Cleeve, Somerset, England, U.K.

History
- Built: 1450s

Site notes
- Area: 27,000 square feet (2,500 m^{2})
- Owner: Marten Street (since 2021)

Listed Building – Grade II*
- Official name: Chapel Cleeve Manor
- Designated: 22 May 1969
- Reference no.: 1057541

Chapel Cleeve Manor is a Grade II* listed building in Chapel Cleeve, Somerset, England.

It started life in the 1450s as a pilgrims' hostel. The building was enlarged in the 19th and 20th centuries when it was a private house and then a hotel.

== History ==
The oldest part of the house was built as an inn for pilgrims attending the chapel of St Mary which was built by the monks of Cleeve Abbey in the mid-15th century. The chapel was built to replace one which had fallen into the sea; however, the later version no longer exists.

Following the dissolution of the monasteries, the house was leased by Henry VIII to Anthony Busted (Bustard?). However, this was revoked and the estate given to Robert Radcliffe, 1st Earl of Sussex for his services to the king.

In the early 17th century, the property was owned by the Stewkley family who used it as a family home until 1723. It was then purchased by Sir James Langham, 7th Baronet.

In the early 19th century, woods were planted on the estate when the house was extended following designs by Richard Carver.

In World War I, the house was occupied by the Lysaght family who added the current main entrance and a ballroom, which is now used as the dining room. The house used to be surrounded by a landscape park, however most of this had been built on by the 1970s.

In 1969, Donald Rose and his wife, Rita, and sons, Nigel and Kevin, purchased the house and turned it into a successful country public house and bar restaurant, putting on massive balls, dances and weddings. They stayed until 1972 when it was sold as a going concern and the family emigrated to New Zealand.

In the 1980s, it was being used as the Chapel Cleeve Manor Hotel.

== Present day ==
In 1998, the house was bought for £360,000 by a couple who intended to restore it with friends. Part-restoration of some areas was completed in 2002. After having parted ways, the remaining owner, Jeannie Wilkins, unable to afford further restoration works and upkeep, placed the 17-bedroom house, with 7 acres (2.8 ha) of land, up for sale with a price of £1,695,000. However, it was estimated by Jeannie Wilkins it would take at least £500,000 to make it habitable.

In 2012, after having been on the market unsold for over a year, the manor was used in an episode of the Channel 4 television series Country House Rescue. Strategies were discussed and tested, with the house used as a location for ghost-hunting tours and special excursions were run by the West Somerset Railway to the building to help raise funds to assist the current owner to continue restoration works and to reside in the manor.

In June 2015, the manor remained on the market with approximately £500,000 of renovation work needed, although some restoration has been undertaken by students from Somerset College of Arts and Technology. In 2017, the manor was still on the market for £1,475,000.

After owner Jean Wilkins died in September 2020, the house was purchased by the London-based interior designer Marten Street in January 2021.
