= Church of St Giles, Hawkridge =

Church in Somerset, England

Church of St Giles
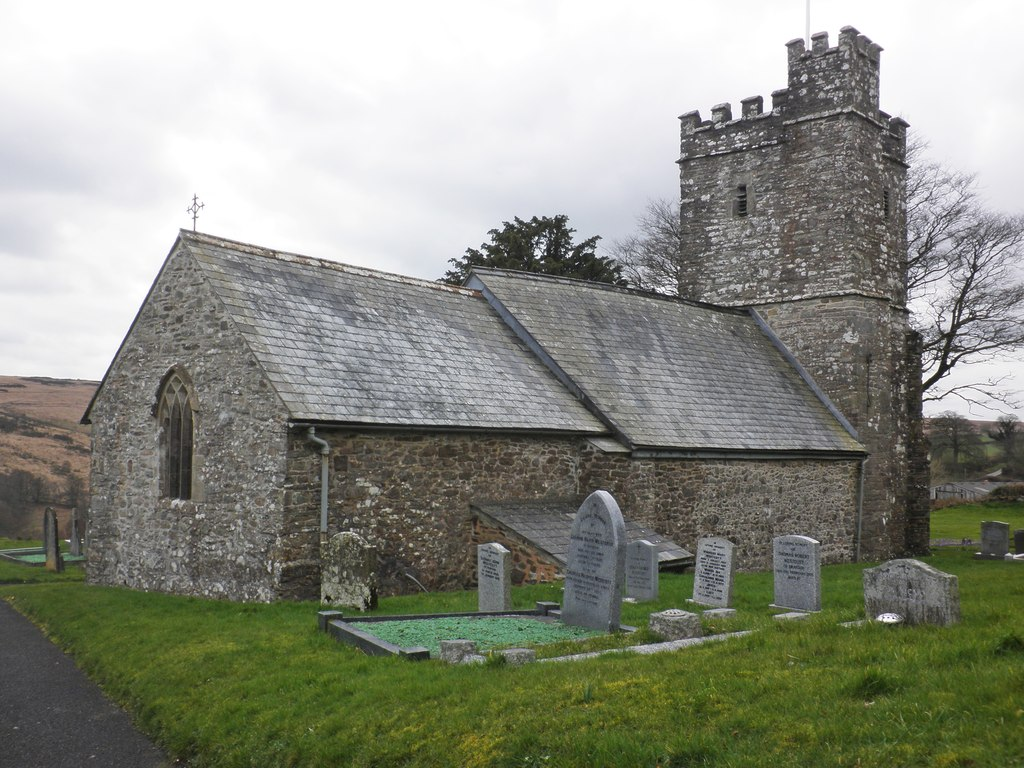

- Location within Somerset
- 51.0638°N 3.6266°W
- Location: Hawkridge, Somerset, England

History
- Built: 14th century

Listed Building – Grade II*
- Official name: Church of St Giles
- Designated: 6 April 1959
- Reference no.: 1174221

The Anglican Church of St Giles in Hawkridge, Somerset, England was built in the 14th century. It is a Grade II* listed building.

== History ==
The oldest part of the church is the north door which is Norman. The chancel and the base of the tower are from the 14th century. The church underwent Victorian restoration in 1878 when the coat of arms of Queen Victoria was added to the chancel arch wall.

The parish is part of Exmoor benefice within the Diocese of Bath and Wells.

== Architecture ==
The stone building has hamstone dressings and a slate roof. It has a chancel and three-bay nave with a wagon roof. The two-stage tower is supported by diagonal buttresses.

Inside the church are a Norman font and a 13th-century stone coffin lid. The font has a circular bowl and stem on a cuboid step.

In the churchyard the stump of a medieval cross can be seen.

== See also ==
- List of ecclesiastical parishes in the Diocese of Bath and Wells
