= St Mary's Church, Stringston =

Church in Somerset, England

St Mary's Church
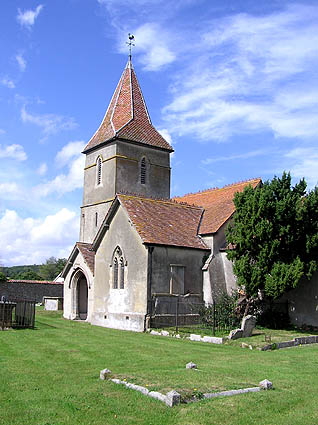

- Location within Somerset
- 51°10′32″N 3°10′40″W
- Location: Stringston, Somerset, England

Listed Building – Grade II
- Official name: Church of St Mary
- Designated: 16 November 1984
- Reference no.: 1057383

Listed Building – Grade II*
- Official name: Churchyard Cross, 5 metres South of porch, Church of St Mary
- Designated: 16 November 1984
- Reference no.: 1308144

Scheduled monument
- Official name: Stringston churchyard cross
- Reference no.: 1006171

The Anglican St Mary's Church at Stringston in the English county of Somerset dates from the 17th century. It has been designated as a Grade II listed building.

The current building replaced an earlier one linked to Kilve Chantry. Although there is some 17th-century fabric left in the building, most of existing stonework is from the late 19th and early 20th century following a Victorian restoration. The three-stage west tower is supported by diagonal buttresses.

Within the churchyard is a cross dating from the 14th century, which is on the Heritage at Risk Register. It has two steps and an octagonal shaft supporting a canopied head. It is Grade II* listed and scheduled as an ancient monument. There is also a chest tomb surrounded by railing.

The parish is part of The Quantock Coast Benefice within the archdeaconry of Taunton.

== See also ==
- List of ecclesiastical parishes in the Diocese of Bath and Wells
