= Landacre Bridge =

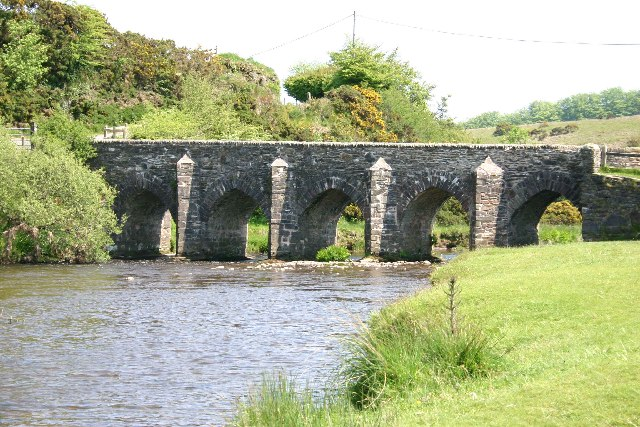
- Coordinates: 51.1119°N 3.6919°W
- Carries: Unclassified road
- Crosses: River Barle
- Heritage status: Grade II* listed building, ancient monument

Characteristics
- Design: Arch bridge
- Material: Stone
- Width: 2.7 metres (8 ft 10 in)
- No. of spans: Five
- Piers in water: Four

History
- Construction end: Late medieval

Landacre Bridge carries Landacre Lane across the River Barle near Withypool on Exmoor in the English county of Somerset. It has been designated as a scheduled monument and a Grade II* listed building.

The stone bridge has five arches each with a span of 9 feet (2.7 m). It has pointed arches with cutwaters. On either side of the road carriageway are parapets 0.6 metres (2 ft 0 in) high.

It was built in the late medieval period with the first documentary evidence being from 1610. Restoration work was undertaken in 1875, and again following damage during flooding in 1952.

The grassy banks are grazed by sheep and provide an environment for Montbretia, Ivy-leaved Bellflower and Bottle Sedge, with the wetter areas supporting Bog-bean, Marsh Speedwell, Bog Asphodel and Round-leaved Sundew. The river itself has populations of Watermilfoil and the hybrid between Monkeyflower and Blood-drop-emlets.

The bridge has also given its name to a Morris Dance by Exmoor Border Morris, which they performed at the bridge in 2016.
