= Church of St Mary, Brompton Regis =

Church in Somerset, England

Church Of St Mary
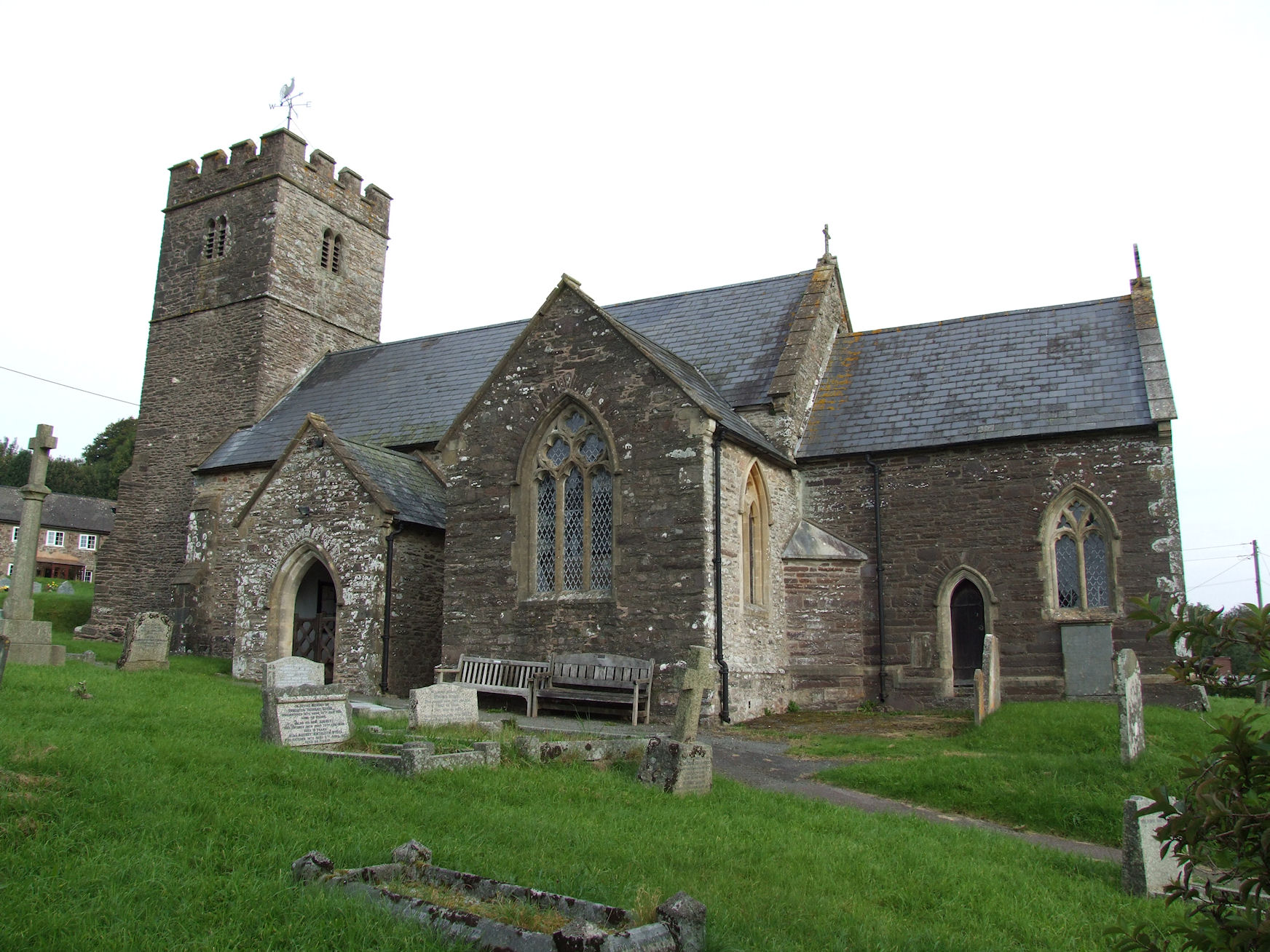

- Location within Somerset
- 51.0731°N 3.4981°W
- Location: Brompton Regis, Somerset, England

History
- Built: 13th century

Listed Building – Grade II*
- Official name: Church Of St Mary
- Designated: 6 April 1959
- Reference no.: 1057978

The Anglican Church of St Mary in Brompton Regis, Somerset, England was built in the 13th century. It is a Grade II* listed building.

== History ==
The tower of the church survives from the 13th-century building, but the nave was rebuilt and the north aisle added around 1490.

A musicians gallery was added in 1770. Victorian restoration was undertaken in the 19th century when the roof was replaced and the south transept added to the building. In 2010 permission was granted for the construction of a disabled toilet at the church.

The parish is part of the benefice of Dulverton with Brushford, Brompton Regis, Upton and Withiel Florey within the Diocese of Bath and Wells.

== Architecture ==
The stone building has a slate roof. It consists of a four-bay, chancel, south transept, and a four-bay north aisle. The two-stage west tower is supported by diagonal buttresses. A church may have stood on the site from the 11th century, which was the property of Barlynch Priory.

Inside the church the pulpit dates from 1625, while the font is 19th century. An early barrel organ was replaced in 1897 with a reed organ, by Thomas Christopher Lewis, which still remains in the church but has been moved from its original position. The organ was again restored in 2014.

== See also ==
- List of ecclesiastical parishes in the Diocese of Bath and Wells
