= Church of St Mary, East Quantoxhead =

Church in Somerset, England

Church of St Mary
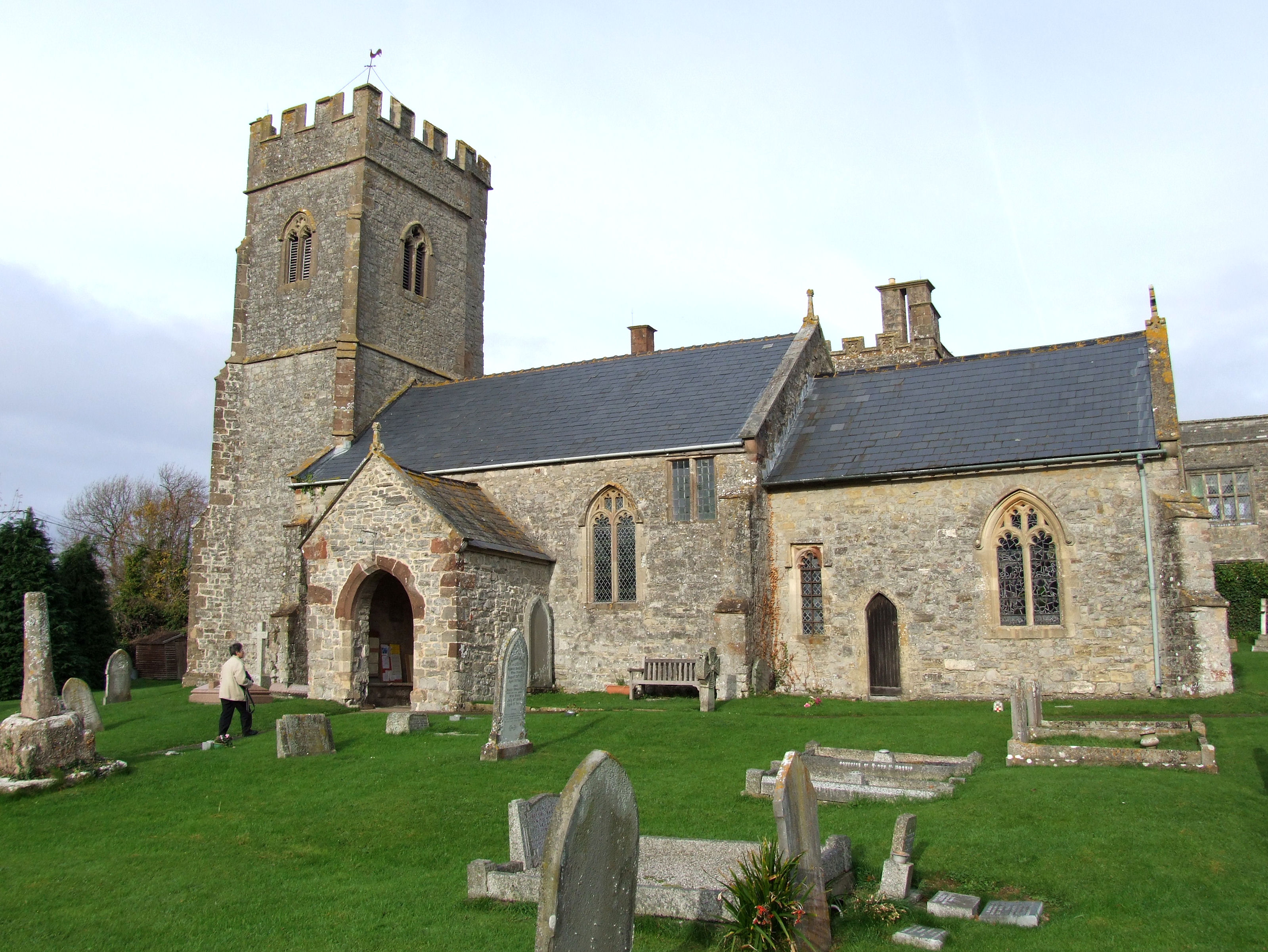

- Location within Somerset
- 51.1856°N 3.237°W
- Location: East Quantoxhead, Somerset, England

History
- Built: 14th century

Listed Building – Grade II*
- Official name: Church of St Mary
- Designated: 22 May 1969
- Reference no.: 1057410

The Anglican Church of St Mary in East Quantoxhead, Somerset, England was built in the 14th century. It is a Grade II* listed building.

== History ==
The church was built in the 14th century on the site of an earlier church which had been on the site at least since 1259. It was restored in 1698 with further Victorian restoration in 1860. The church is next to Court House which housed the Lords of the Manor who are commemorated in the church.

The parish is part of the Quantock Coast benefice within the Diocese of Bath and Wells.

== Architecture ==
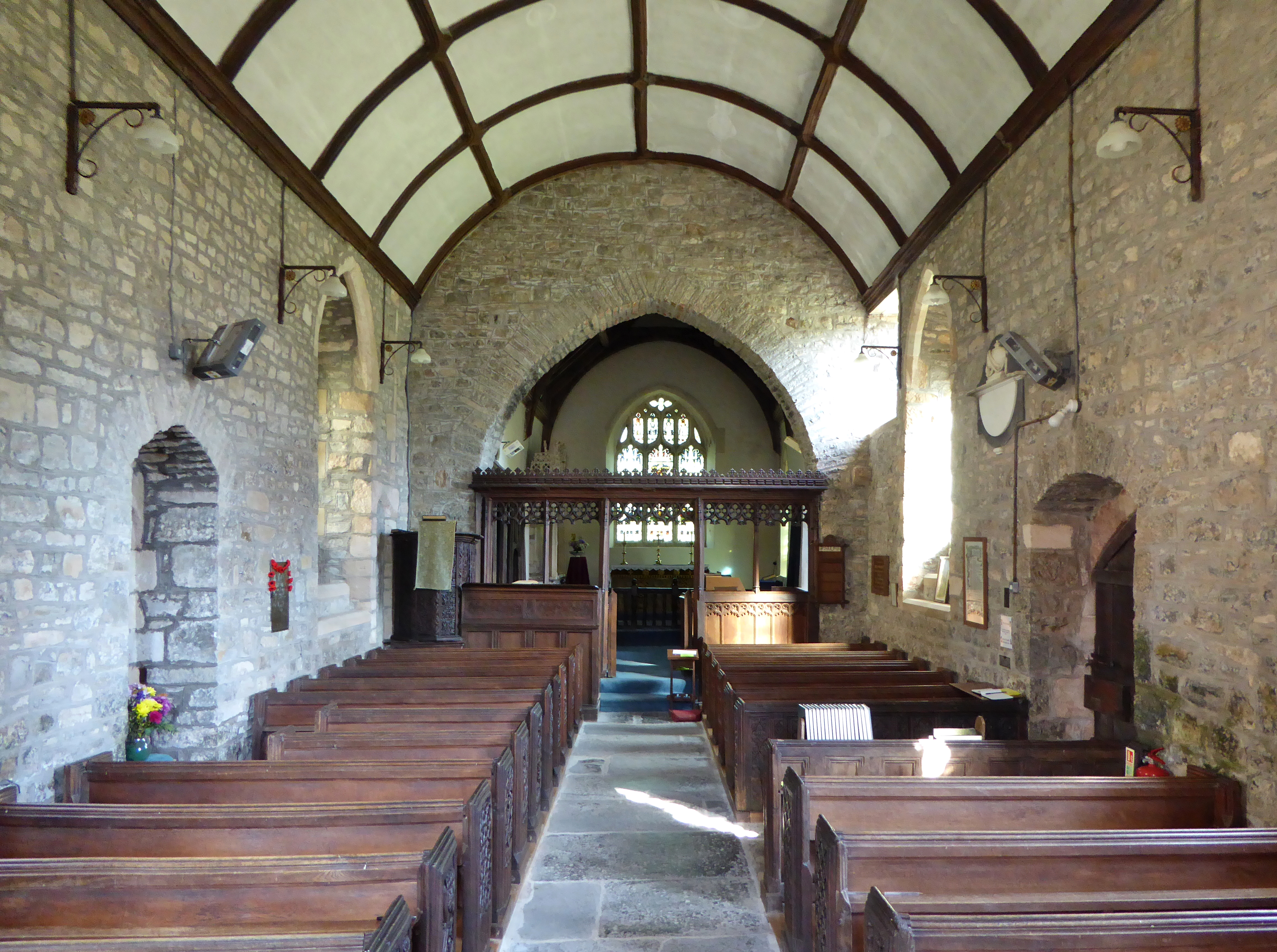
The interior of the Church of St Mary.

The stone building had sandstone dressing and slate roofs. It consists of a two-bay nave with a chancel, north east vestry and a south porch. The three-stage tower is supported by diagonal buttresses.

Inside the church the rood screen was restored in the 19th century but has parts from the 14th. The pulpit was built in 1633.

In the churchyard is a 14th century cross which was restored in the 19th century.

== See also ==
- List of ecclesiastical parishes in the Diocese of Bath and Wells
