= Church of St Mary Magdalene, Withiel Florey =

Church in Somerset, England

Church of St Mary Magdalene
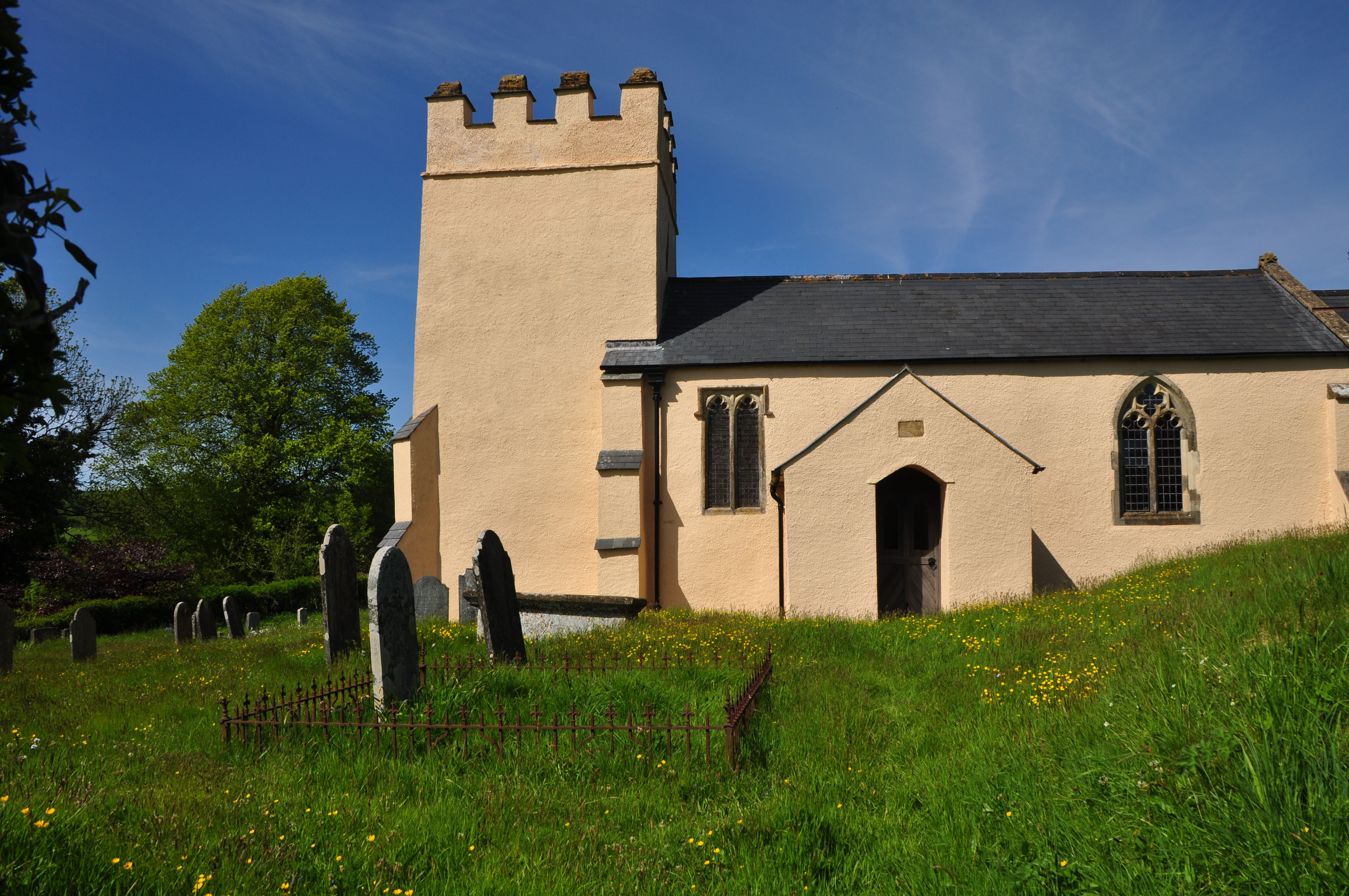

- Location within Somerset
- 51.0899°N 3.448°W
- Location: Withiel Florey, Somerset, England

History
- Built: 12th century

Listed Building – Grade II*
- Official name: Church of St Mary Magdalene
- Designated: 6 April 1959
- Reference no.: 1057984

The Anglican Church of St Mary Magdalene in Withiel Florey, Somerset, England was built in the 12th century. It is a Grade II* listed building.

== History ==
Parts of the church date back to the 12th century. In 1110 it was the property of Taunton Priory. In the 15th century the nave was extended and the tower and porch added. In 1848 a Victorian restoration was carried out and the vestry added.

In 1959 proposals were made to demolish the church. These were defeated and further restoration undertaken.

The parish is part of the Dulverton with Brushford, Brompton Regis, Upton, Skilgate and Withiel Florey benefice within the Diocese of Bath and Wells.

== Architecture ==
The stone building has red sandstone dressings and a slate roof. It consists of a two-bay nave, two-bay chancel with two-storey vestry and a south porch. The aisle is 62 feet (19 m) long and 14 feet (4.3 m) wide.

The two-stage tower is supported by diagonal buttresses.

Inside the church is a Norman font. Most of the other fitting including the pulpit, harmonium and wrought iron altar rails are from the Victorian era.
