= Stringston =

Village and civil parish in Somerset, England

Coordinates: 51.1756°N 3.1778°W

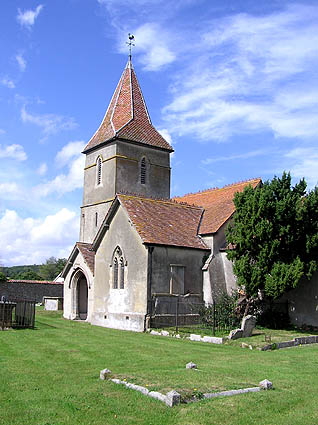
- Stringston church

- Location within Somerset
- Population: 116
- OS grid reference: ST177424
- Civil parish: Stringston
- Unitary authority: Somerset Council
- Ceremonial county: Somerset
- Region: South West
- Country: England
- Sovereign state: United Kingdom
- Post town: BRIDGWATER
- Postcode district: TA5
- Dialling code: 01278
- Police: Avon and Somerset
- Fire: Devon and Somerset
- Ambulance: South Western
- UK Parliament: Tiverton and Minehead

Stringston is a village and civil parish on the northern edge of the Quantock Hills in the English county of Somerset. The village is 10 miles (16 km) west of Bridgwater, and close to the villages of Holford, Kilve and Stogursey. In 2002, the parish was estimated to have a population of 116.

Besides the village of Stringston itself, the parish includes the settlements of Lilstock and Kilton.

== History ==
The name of the village means Strenge's settlement and was part of the Acland-Hood estate.

Kilton and Lilstock were separate ancient parishes, part of the Williton and Freemanners Hundred. Kilton took its name from Kilve Hill. It was first mentioned in 873, when King Alfred gave his estate at Kilton to his son Edward the Elder under his will. Kilton became a civil parish in 1866, but in 1886 was combined with Lilstock to form the civil parish of Kilton cum Lilstock, itself abolished in 1933 and absorbed into Stringston.

== Governance ==
The parish council has responsibility for local issues, including setting an annual precept (local rate) to cover the council’s operating costs and producing annual accounts for public scrutiny. The parish council evaluates local planning applications and works with the local police, district council officers, and neighbourhood watch groups on matters of crime, security, and traffic. The parish council's role also includes initiating projects for the maintenance and repair of parish facilities, as well as consulting with the district council on the maintenance, repair, and improvement of highways, drainage, footpaths, public transport, and street cleaning. Conservation matters (including trees and listed buildings) and environmental issues are also the responsibility of the council.

For local government purposes, since 1 April 2023, the parish comes under the unitary authority of Somerset Council. Prior to this, it was part of the non-metropolitan district of Somerset West and Taunton (formed on 1 April 2019) and, before this, the district of West Somerset (established under the Local Government Act 1972). It was part of Williton Rural District before 1974.

It is also part of the Tiverton and Minehead county constituency represented in the House of Commons of the Parliament of the United Kingdom. It elects one Member of Parliament (MP) by the first past the post system of election.

== Religious sites ==
The Church of St Mary dates from the 17th century and has been designated by English Heritage as a Grade II listed building. Within the churchyard is a cross dating from the 14th century, which is on the Heritage at Risk Register.

The Church of St. Nicholas in Kilton has a 14th-century chancel, with the lower stages of the tower and nave being added in the late 15th or early 16th century.
