= Church of St Mary, Oare =

Church in Somerset, England

Church of St Mary
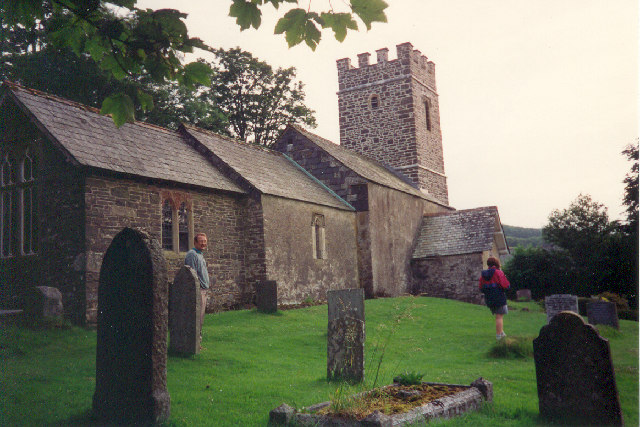

- Location within Somerset
- 51.2124°N 3.7164°W
- Location: Oare, Somerset, England

History
- Built: 15th century

Listed Building – Grade II*
- Official name: Church of St Mary
- Designated: 22 May 1969
- Reference no.: 1345381

The Anglican Church of St Mary in Oare, Somerset, England, was built in the 15th century. It is a Grade II* listed building.

== History ==
The nave and inner chancel survive from a 15th-century building, but the outer chancel and tower were rebuilt in the 19th century.

The parish and benefice of Oare with Culbone is part of the Diocese of Bath and Wells.

The church was used as the location of a marriage in the novel Lorna Doone by R. D. Blackmore, whose grandfather had been the rector of the church between 1809 and 1842.

== Architecture ==
The stone building has slate roofs. It consists of a three-bay nave, with an inner and outer chancel, each of one bay. The three-stage is unbuttressed.

Inside the church are 18th century box pews and a Norman font on an 18th-century base. There is also a 15th-century piscina with a "grotesque head", said to represent St Decuman.
