= Chapel of St Leonard, Tivington =

Church in Somerset, England

Chapel of St Leonard
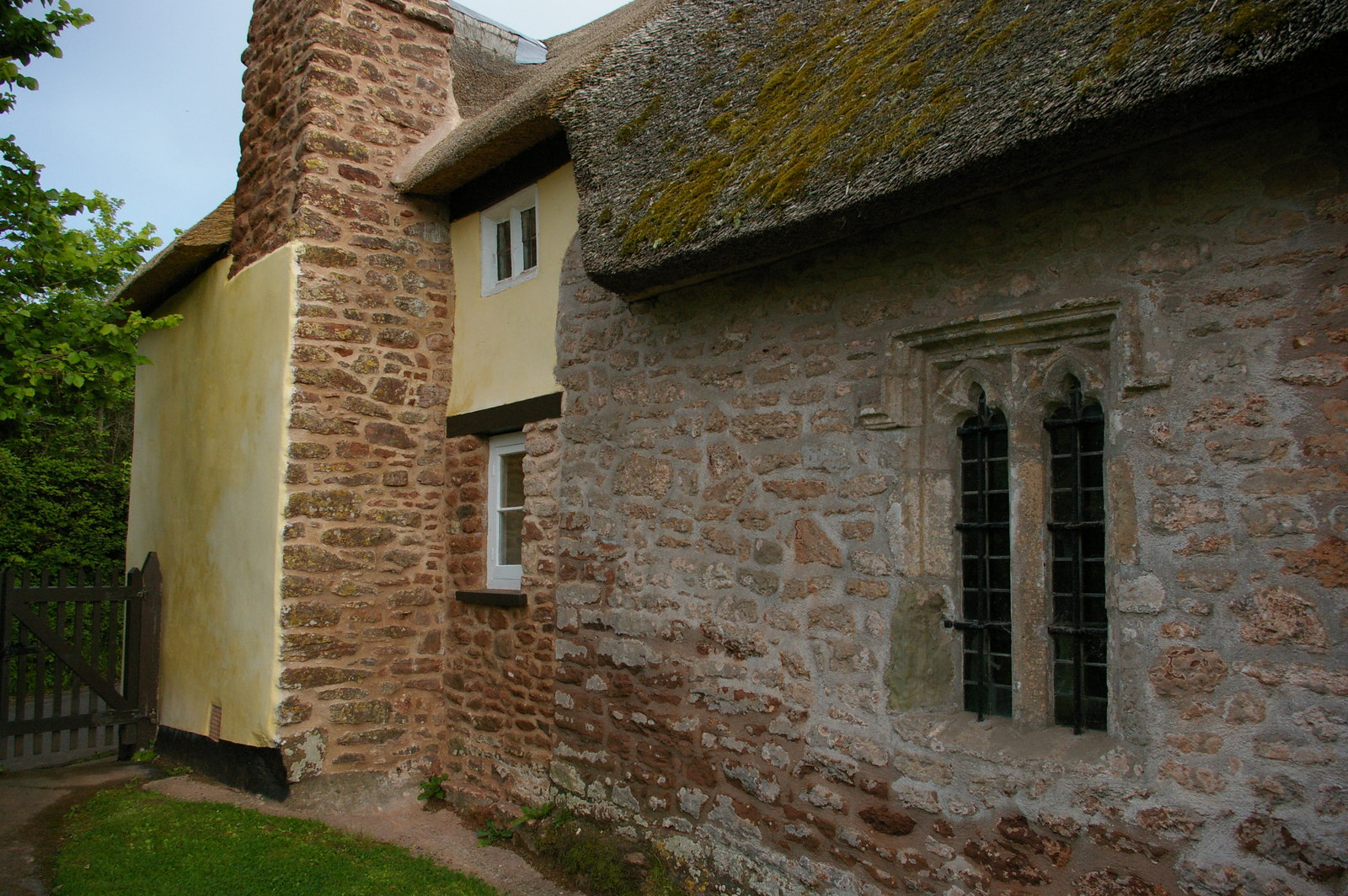

- Location within Somerset
- 51.1946°N 3.5281°W
- Location: Tivington, Somerset, England

History
- Built: Mid 14th century

Listed Building – Grade II*
- Official name: Chapel of St Leonard
- Designated: 22 May 1969
- Reference no.: 1345394

The Anglican Chapel of St Leonard in Tivington, Somerset, England was built in the mid 14th century as a chapel of ease. It is a Grade II* listed building.

== History ==
The chapel was built in the 14th century. After the Dissolution of the Monasteries it was secularised and a fireplace installed at the east end. That part of the building is now the cottage "Dunkery View" which is owned by the National Trust. The chapel was restored in 1896 and was reconsecrated in 1940, having previously been used as a school. The restoration work was funded by the Acland baronets who were the local Lords of the manor. The bell above the entrance door is believed to have come from their yacht Lady of St Kilda

The chapel is within the parish of Selworthy which is part of the Porlock and Porlock Weir with Stoke Pero, Selworthy and Luccombe benefice within the Diocese of Bath and Wells.

== Architecture ==
The seven bay building is of red sandstone with a thatched roof. The interior furniture including the reading desk and pews were brought in from other local churches.
