= The Kildare Lodge Inn =

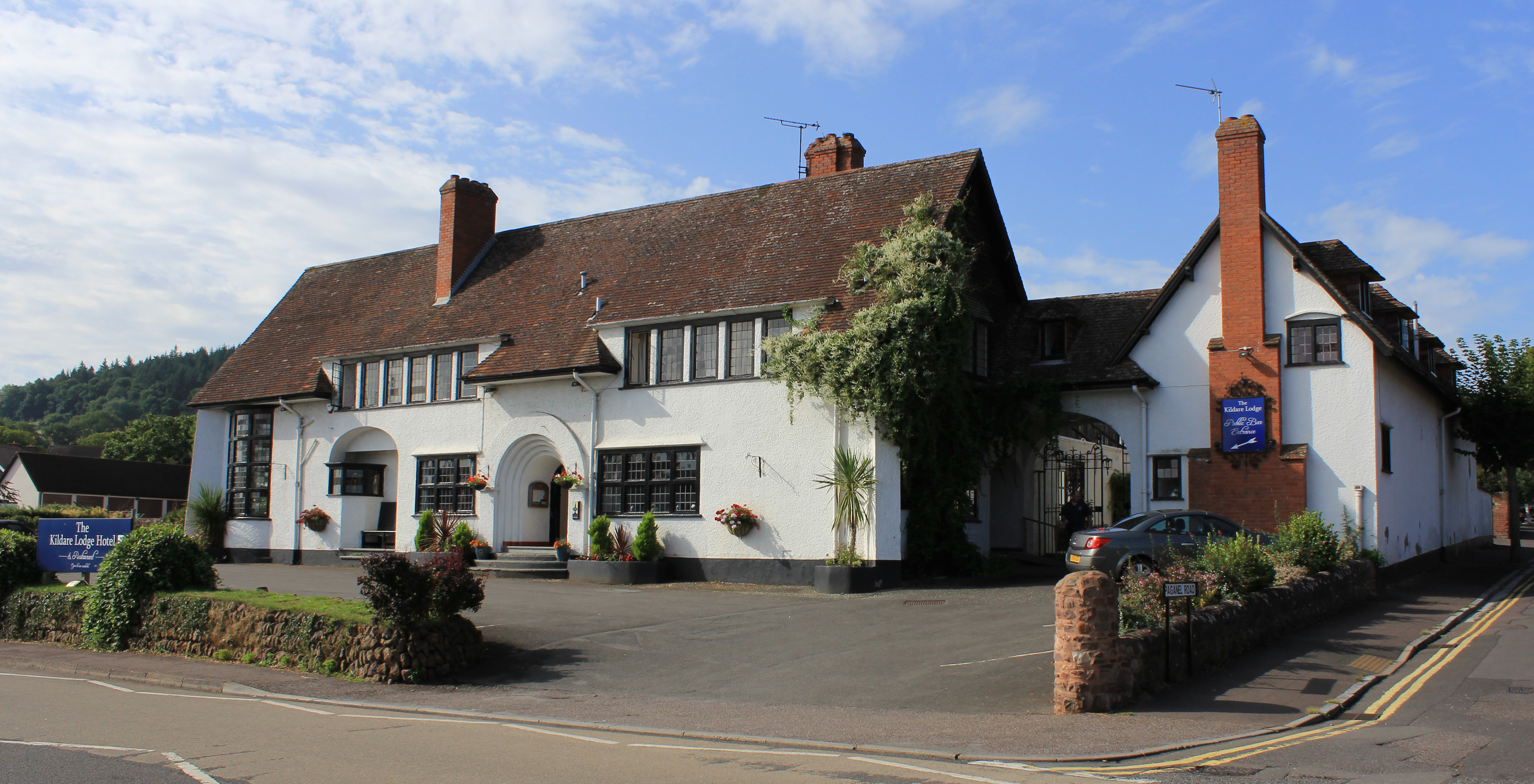
- The Kildare Lodge Inn, Minehead

- Location within Somerset
- 51°12′07″N 3°28′37″W
- Location: Minehead, Somerset, England

History
- Built: 1905/6

Site notes
- Architect: Richard Barry Parker
- Architectural style: Arts and crafts

Listed Building – Grade II*
- Official name: The Kildare Lodge Inn
- Designated: 28 October 1976
- Reference no.: 1279930

The Kildare Lodge Inn in Minehead, Somerset, England, was built in 1905/6, and is located at 18 Townsend Road, to the south east of the town centre of the seaside resort of Minehead. Originally built as a house, incorporating a doctor's surgery, coach house and stables; it is now used as a pub. The building has been designated as a Grade II* listed building since 1976.

== History ==
The structure was built in 1905/6 to the plans of the architect Richard Barry Parker of Parker & Unwin, in the style of C. F. A. Voysey. It was constructed for Mr Corbett and Dr Gordon Henry, the latter a local doctor who had previously resided at Blair Lodge.

Most of the original interior features are intact, as described in the green plaque situated next to the main entrance, which was placed by the Minehead Conservation Society.

The property currently has 12 en suite bedrooms, including a bridal suite with a four-poster bed, available for bed and breakfast styled accommodation. It also has its own restaurant. The pub is listed on the local branch's website of the Campaign for Real Ale, and is included in a recent edition of the Good Beer Guide. It holds two beer festivals each year.

== Architecture ==
It has been described as "the most interesting Arts and Crafts house in the region".

The building consists of painted roughcast over brick or rubble stone. It has a plain tile roof incorporating a brick stack to the centre of front slope, a ridge stack to the rear left wing and a gable-end stack to the right wing. It is built in a U-shaped plan in the Arts and Crafts style. It has two storeys; with a two-window range. The steeply pitched roof has deep overhanging eaves, which project at the sides and centre, where it forms a porch over a large stepped semicircular-arched entrance. The half dormer between the centre and left projection has six light leaded casement windows. To the right there is a roofed archway, in which there is a dormer window with hip roof and roof cheeks, connecting to the otherwise separate right wing. In the archway is a pair of tall cast-iron gates. Most other windows are wood-mullioned and transomed with leaded panes; to the far left is a two-storey convex curved window reaching up to the eaves. To the right of it is a semi-elliptical recess, in which a low three-sided plinth to the left supports similar, but has smaller windows with a seat to the right. The left return has a weather boarded gable to the right over two tall windows similar to that at the front. The rear has two projecting gables from the left wing all in keeping with the rest of the design, except for a flat-roofed extension to the rear of the main building. The windows to the rear wings reflect the general style.

The interior of the building is complete and is a fine example of Parker's work, which includes stairs to the rear centre, now cased in, with stick balusters, some wide and fretted, leading to a curved landing with similar balusters. The dining room to the left is open to the rafters, with a glazed balcony from the stairs, a large recess containing an open fire with a cast-iron grate and elaborate cupboards with ornamental copper hinges over the lintel. To the rear are steps up to a smaller room with curved planked doors. Mullions, etc, are carved in the Art Nouveau style. To the first floor are planked doors with small windows.

== Bibliography ==
- Gray, A. Stuart, Edwardian Architecture A Biographical Dictionary, Gerald Duckworth and Company, London, 1986, paperback edition, p. 277, ISBN 978-0715621417
