= St Decuman's Church, Watchet =

Church in Somerset, England

Church of St Decuman
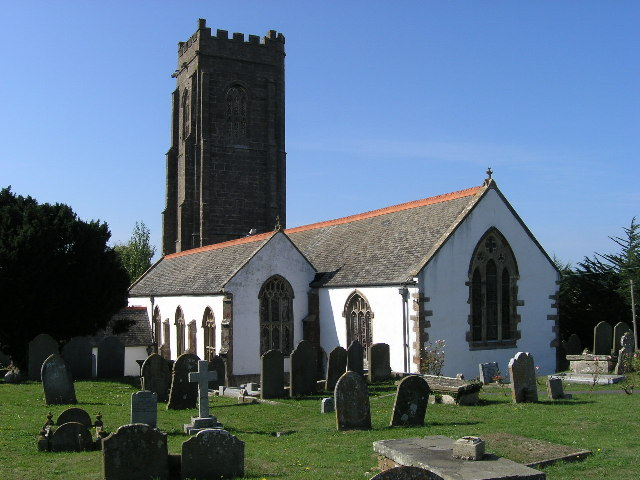

- Location within Somerset

General information
- Location: Watchet, England
- Coordinates: 51.1796°N 3.3302°W
- Completed: 15th century

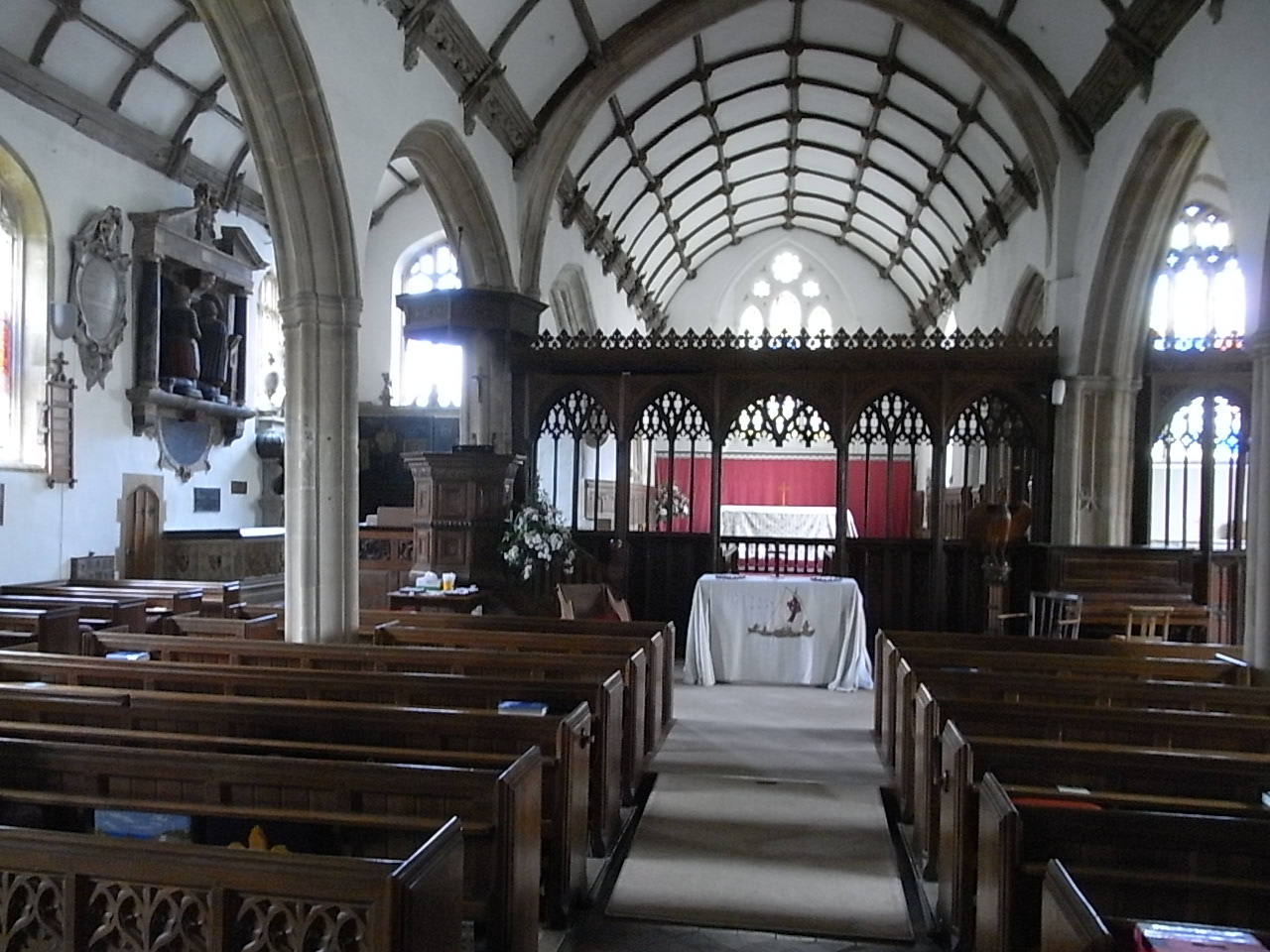
Interior view east towards chancel, showing Wyndham Chapel in north aisle to left

The Church of St Decuman in Watchet, Somerset, England has a 13th-century chancel with the rest of the church being from the 15th century. It has been designated as a Grade I listed building.

The dedication is because Watchet is believed to be the place where Saint Decuman was killed in 706.

The church stands on a prominent site overlooking the town. It was restored and reseated by James Piers St Aubyn in 1886–1891, with further internal alterations being made in 1896 when the Caen stone reredos was erected.

The church was described by Francis Carolus Eeles ("St Decuman's Church") in 1932. He highlighted a fine geometrical east window with original tracery dating from the end of the 13th century and the perpendicular window tracery in the south isle. The series of wagon roofs with rich carving are above the rood screen in the nave and south aisle. The organ was presented to the church in 1933 by W. Wyndham.

== Wyndham Chapel ==
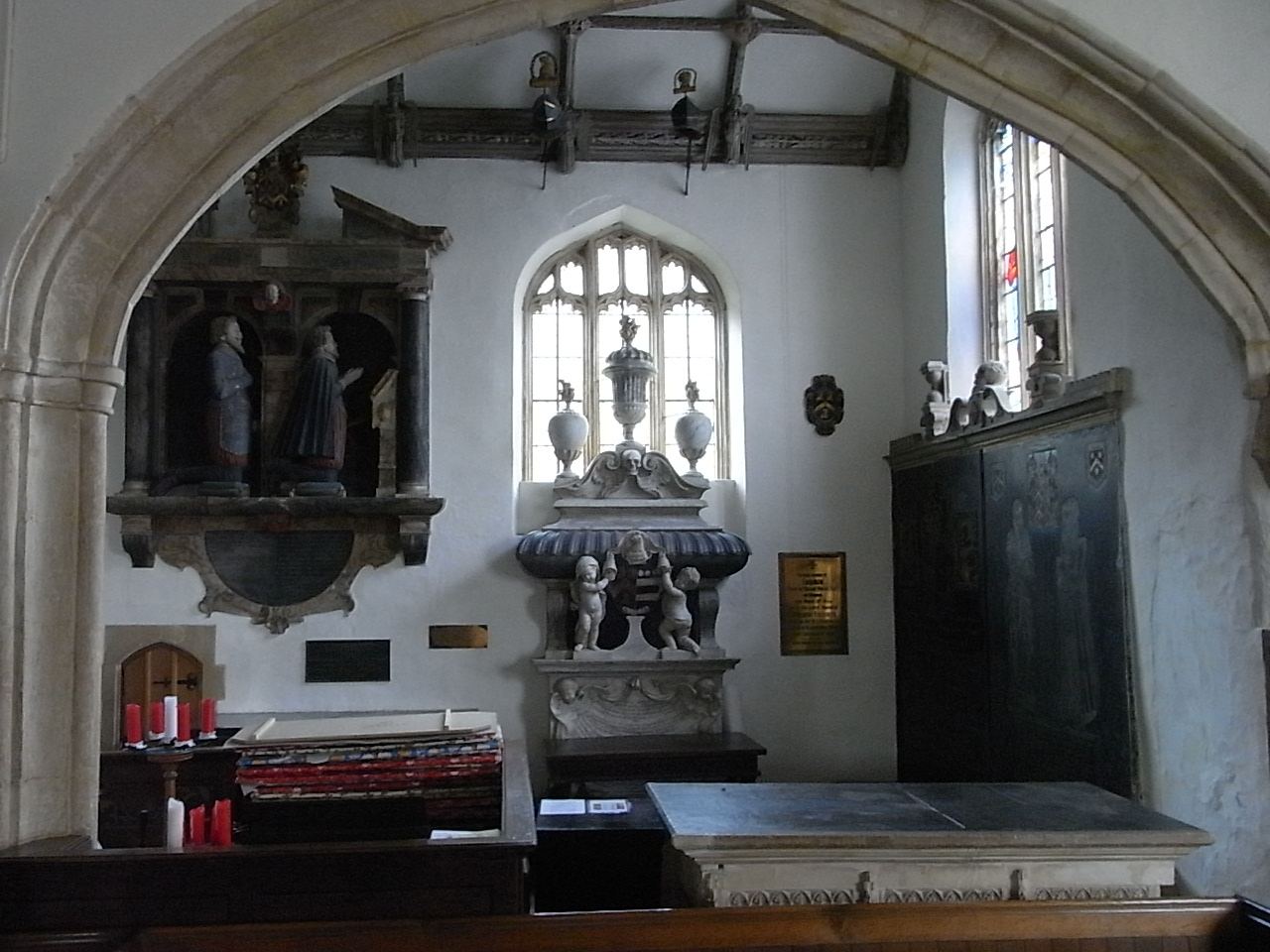
View northwards from the chancel into the Wyndham Chapel

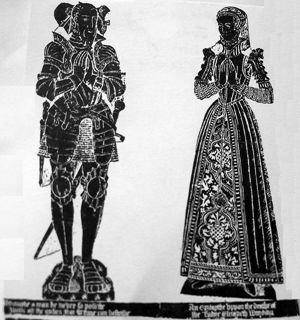
Brass rubbing of monumental brass of Sir John Wyndham and his wife Elizabeth Sydenham (d.1571) on their chest tomb, St Decuman's Church, Watchet

The Wyndham Chapel occupies the east end of the north aisle and is dedicated to the Wyndham family of nearby Orchard Wyndham House, former lords of the manor. Included is a memorial to Sir John Wyndham (1558 – 1645), who played an important role in the establishment of defence organisation in the West Country against the threat of the Spanish Armada. Next to his monument is one to his parents, and the chest tomb of his grandparents, with monumental brasses, serves to separate the chapel from the chancel. A mural monument exists with kneeling effigies of two of Sir John's sons, Henry and George, as well as other monuments to the later family of Wyndham.

== Burials ==
- John Wyndham (1558–1645)
- Florence Wadham (buried alive)

== Churchyard ==
In the churchyard is the remains of a 15th-century stone cross.

== Well ==
St Decuman's well is below the church. It is a 19th-century reconstruction of the earlier well on the site which dates from the Middle Ages.

== See also ==
- Grade I listed buildings in West Somerset
- List of Somerset towers
- List of ecclesiastical parishes in the Diocese of Bath and Wells
