= Dodington Hall =

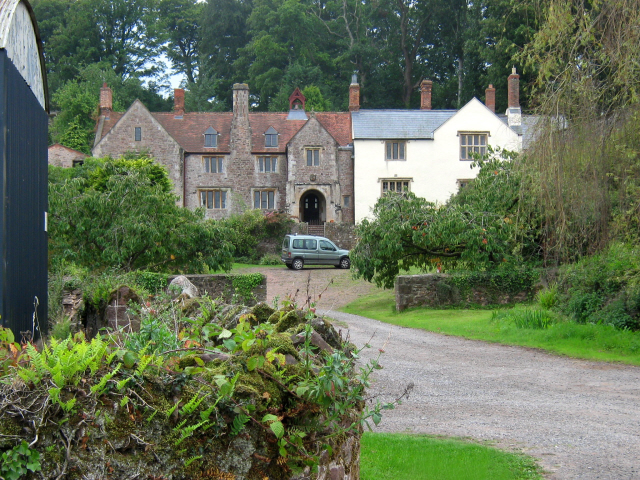

- Location within Somerset
- 51°09′29″N 3°11′06″W
- Location: Dodington, Somerset, England

History
- Built: 15th century

Listed Building – Grade II*
- Official name: Dodington Hall
- Designated: 22 May 1969
- Reference no.: 1057421

Dodington Hall in Dodington, within the English county of Somerset, was built in the 15th century. It is a Grade II* listed building.

The house is built of local red sandstone and has a slate roof with several tall chimney stacks.

In the open hall is a decorated ceiling, with another in the parlour wing which also contains heraldic glass which has survived from the original construction in 1485.

The manor house was expanded in 1581, but then fell into disrepair and was let as a farmhouse during the 17th century.

It contains the mechanism of a water driven spit in the cellar below the kitchen.
