= Church of St Michael, Minehead =

Church in Somerset, England

Church of St Michael
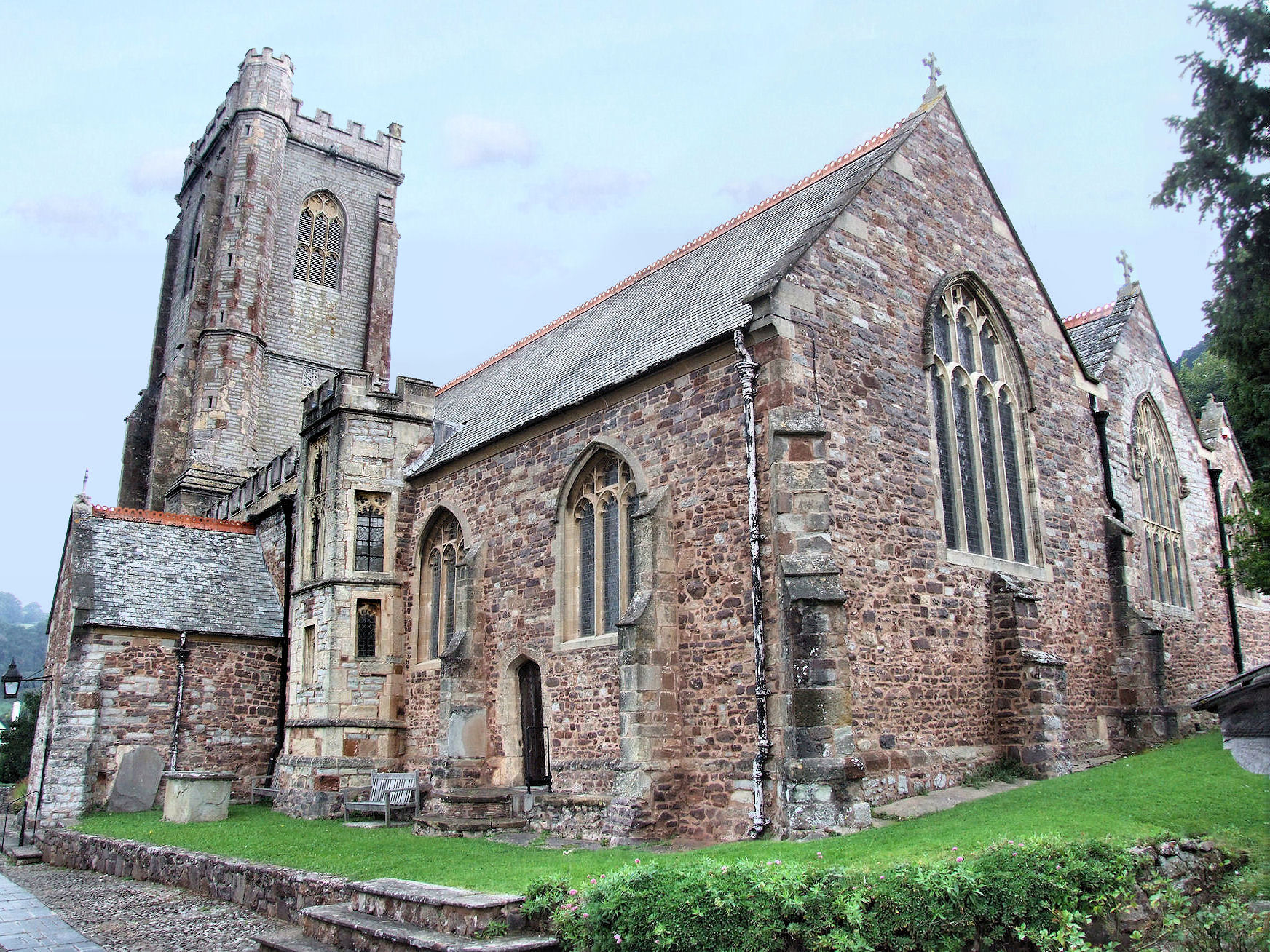

- Location within Somerset
- 51.2109°N 3.4805°W
- Location: Minehead, Somerset, England

History
- Built: 15th century

Listed Building – Grade II*
- Official name: Parish Church of St Michael
- Designated: 28 October 1976
- Reference no.: 1207000

The Anglican Church of St Michael in Minehead, Somerset, England was built in the 15th century. It is a Grade II* listed building.

== History ==
The church was built in the 15th century on the site of a previous building from which parts of the south porch can still be seen. William de Mohun gave the church to Bruton Priory in the 12th century. They held the advowson until the Dissolution of the Monasteries.

Its tower used to display a beacon light for ships approaching the harbour. After being caught in a violent storm at sea, Robert Quirke dedicated a ship and its cargo to God's service, as well as donating a cellar near the quay for prayers to be offered for those at sea. Dating from 1628 and known as the Gibraltar Celler, it is now the Chapel of St Peter. Quirke also donated money from the sale of the ship and its cargo to build almshouses.

The church underwent Victorian restoration in 1880 and was further restored in 1974.

The parish and benefice of Minehead are within the Diocese of Bath and Wells.

== Architecture ==
The blue lias building has red sandstone dressings and a slate roof. It consists of an aisle with a projecting north east chapel. The nave and chancel are each of eight bays and have slim octagonal piers and double-chamfered arches. The tower is supported by set back buttresses. The oldest of the bells in the tower was cast in 1607.

Inside the church at a 15th-century font and late medieval rood screen and rood stair. The pulpit is from the 17th century. There are various memorials and the coats of arms of Queen Anne and George II. There is a stained glass window designed by Sir Henry Holiday, which appeared on postage stamps in 2009.

== See also ==
- List of ecclesiastical parishes in the Diocese of Bath and Wells
