= Samaritans Way South West =

103-mile footpath in south-west England

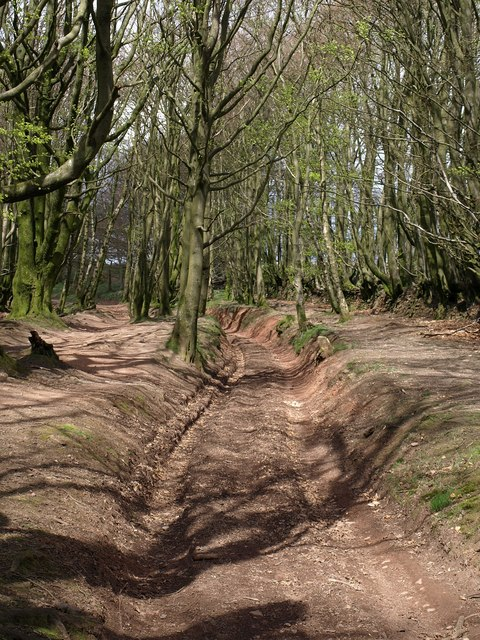
- The Samaritans Way South West on a bridleway on the Quantock Hills
- Length: 166 kilometres (103 mi)
- Location: Somerset
- Established: 2004
- Trailheads: Clifton Suspension Bridge; Lynmouth
- Use: Hiking
- Elevation change: 6,061 metres (19,885 ft)
- Highest point: 439 metres (1,440 ft)
- Website: swsw.bristolramblers.org.uk

Samaritans Way South West is a 103 miles (166 km) Long-distance footpath in South West England. It was officially opened on 21 April 2004 by the Ramblers Vice Chairman, the Samaritans (charity) Chief Executive and a farmer from Gloucestershire who headed the Farmers Helpline. In the same year it appeared on the Ordnance Survey maps supported and encouraged by Local Authorities, National Parks and Area of Outstanding Natural Beauty by giving their consent; however Somerset County Council later asked the Ordnance Survey to remove the route from their maps. A way marked walk linking the Cotswolds, the Mendips, the Polden Hills, the Quantocks, the Brendons, Exmoor National Park and the North Devon Coast.

It starts at Clifton Suspension Bridge on the Avon Gorge in Bristol, and continues across the Chew Valley with its lakes, over the Mendip Hills to Cheddar Gorge and Cheddar, along the Somerset Levels to Glastonbury and Street and on through Bridgwater and Goathurst to the Quantock Hills with a scenic ridge walk passing through the villages Crowcombe and Stogumber and around the Brendon Hills. The route then crosses Exmoor through the villages of Monksilver, Luxborough, Winsford and Exford to the Doone Valley, Badgworthy Water and Malmsmead to Brendon following the East Lyn River and climbs Myrtleberry Cleaves to Lynton and Lynmouth.

The purpose of the walk was not only pleasure but also to help the rural community especially the small dairy farmers, with the plight of the industry.
