= Malmsmead =

Hamlet in Devon and Somerset, England

Coordinates: 51.217°N 3.733°W

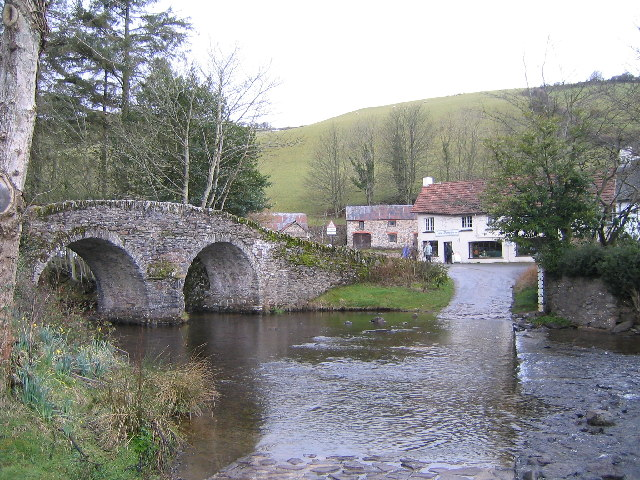
- Malmsmead Bridge and the old ford

- Location within Devon
- OS grid reference: SS790478
- Civil parish: Brendon and Countisbury; Oare
- District: North Devon
- Unitary authority: Somerset
- Shire county: Devon
- Ceremonial county: Somerset
- Region: South West
- Country: England
- Sovereign state: United Kingdom
- Post town: LYNTON
- Postcode district: EX35 6
- Police: Devon and Cornwall
- Fire: Devon and Somerset
- Ambulance: South Western

Malmsmead is a hamlet on the border between the English counties of Devon and Somerset. The nearest town is Lynton, which lies approximately 4.7 miles (7.6 km) west of the hamlet. The hamlet is situated in the Doone Valley within the Exmoor National Park.

== History ==
Malmsmead is not directly mentioned in the Doomsday Book, a record of survey done under William the Conqueror, however it was likely included in the entry for nearby Oare, Somerset.

The border between the counties is along Badgworthy Water, which is crossed by the 17th-century Malmsmead Bridge and an even older adjacent ford. Badgworthy Water is also the boundary between the parishes of Oare (Somerset) and Brendon and Countisbury (Devon).

Malmsmead is both on the route of the Coleridge Way and Samaritans Way South West. Just to the north of the hamlet, Badgworthy Water merges with Oare Water to form the East Lyn River that flows into the sea at Lynmouth.
