= 3 The Grove =

Listed house in Camden, London, England

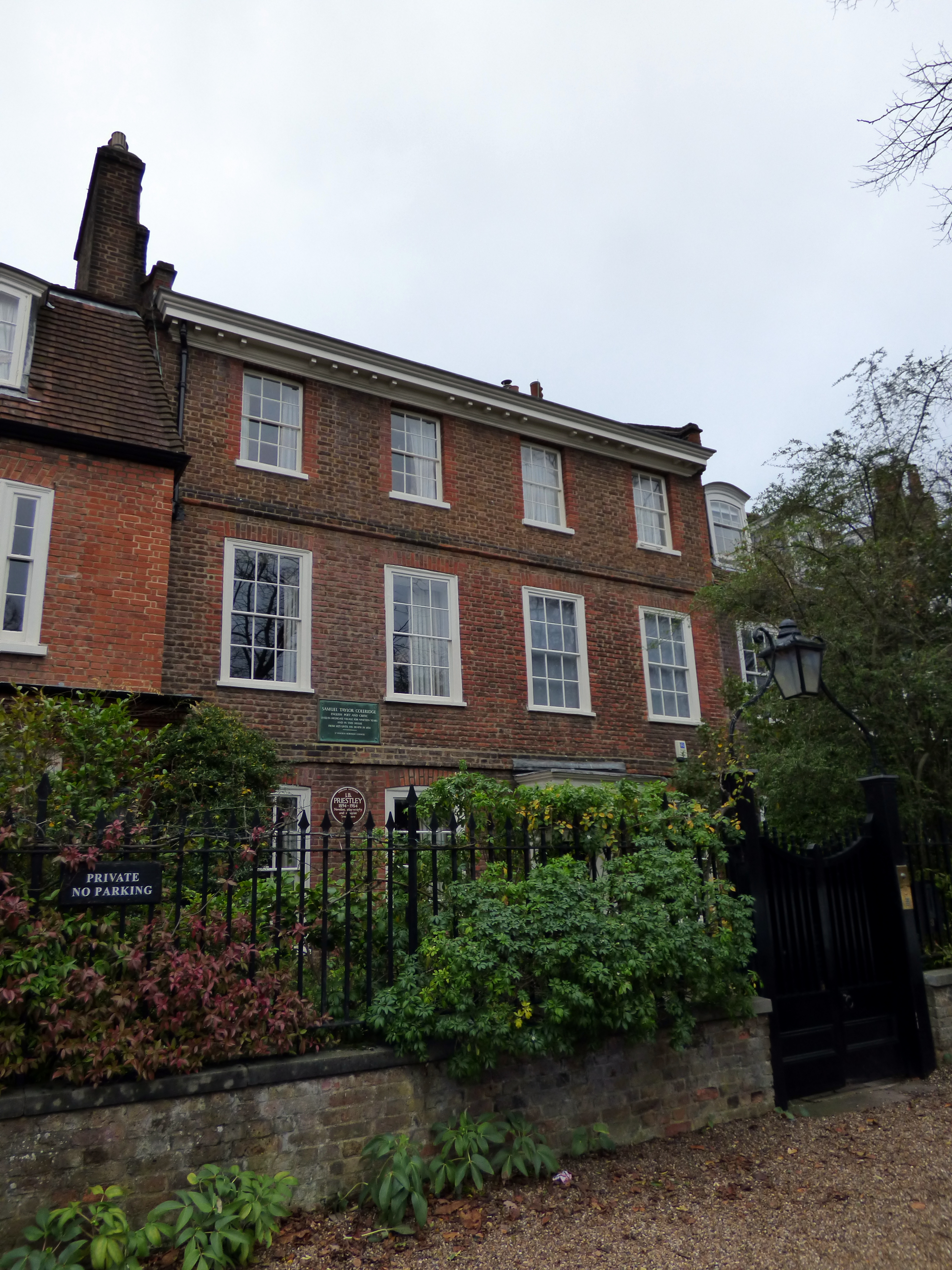
- The house in 2018

- Location within Greater London

General information
- Type: House
- Location: Highgate, Camden, London
- Coordinates: 51.5697°N 0.1519°W
- Year built: c. 1688
- Renovated: Late 19th century (south wing rebuilt, floor added) c. 1930 (altered and added)
- Client: William Blake
- Owner: Privately owned

Design and construction
- Designations

Listed Building – Grade II*
- Official name: Number 3 and attached railings, wall and lamp
- Designated: 10 June 1954
- Reference no.: 1378978

3 The Grove is a 17th-century house in Highgate within the London Borough of Camden. Built by William Blake, in the 19th century it was home of the poet Samuel Taylor Coleridge; in the 20th century, the novelist J. B. Priestley; and in the 21st century, the model Kate Moss. It is a Grade II* listed building.

== History ==
In the 17th century, Highgate was a hamlet to the north of London situated in the midst of the extensive Middlesex estate of the bishops of London. Nos. 1–6 The Grove were built in around 1688 by a City of London merchant, William Blake. Constructed in the gardens of a large mansion called Dorchester House, the speculative development was intended by Blake to fund a charity school he had established in the main building.

In 1816, Samuel Taylor Coleridge came to reside at the Highgate home of Dr. James Gillman at Moreton House, 14 South Grove, seeking treatment for his addiction to opium. When the Gillmans moved in 1823 to No. 3 The Grove, they installed Coleridge in a suite of rooms on the top floor. The National Trust owns a painting of Coleridge's "Sky Parlour" at No. 3 by the illustrator George Scharf which is held at Coleridge Cottage. He remained there until his death in 1834; writing, revising and republishing earlier works such as Kubla Khan, receiving visitors and becoming lauded as "the Sage of Highgate".

In 1931 the house was bought by J. B. Priestley, using the profits from his novels, which had brought literary and worldly success since the publication of The Good Companions in 1929. He engaged Seely & Paget to reconstruct the house and the landscape architects Mawson's to redesign the garden.

In the 21st century, No. 3 was home to the model, Kate Moss. Moss sold the house in 2022.

== Architecture and description ==
Bridget Cherry, in her 2002 revised London 4: North edition of the Pevsner Buildings of England series, describes Nos. 1–6 The Grove, as "the finest group in Highgate". The row was originally built as three pairs of semi-detached houses, of two storeys with dormers above. Most have been greatly altered since. (Note: As an example, No. 5 was completely rebuilt in the early 1930s.) No. 3 is now of three storeys, with a basement and a slate roof. The construction material is red brick.

No. 3 is a Grade II* listed building, the listing including the low wall which fronts the house, and its wrought iron railings and lamp.

== Sources ==
- Cherry, Bridget; Pevsner, Nikolaus (2002). London 4: North. The Buildings Of England. New Haven, US and London: Yale University Press. ISBN 978-0-300-09653-8. OCLC 846526006.
