= Coleridge Way =

Long-distance footpath in Somerset and Devon, England

Coordinates: 51°12′31″N 3°34′44″W

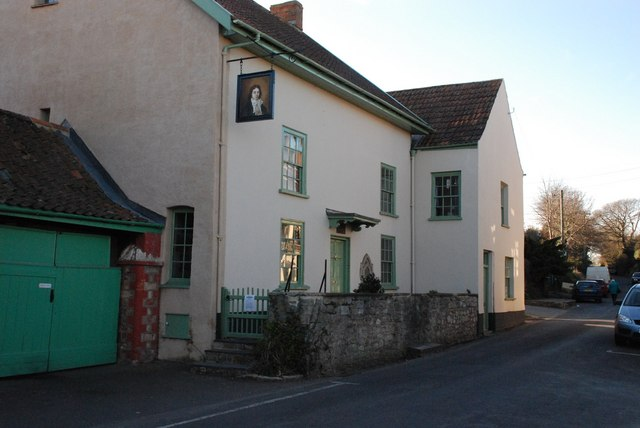
- Coleridge Cottage
- Length: 51 mi (82 km)
- Location: Quantock Hills, Exmoor National Park, Somerset, England
- Trailheads: Nether Stowey/Lynmouth
- Use: Hiking

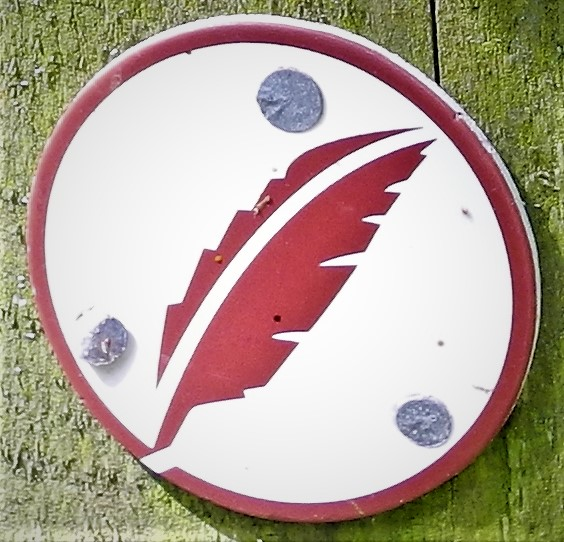
The waymark of the Coleridge Way is a quill pen which appears on wooden posts throughout the route

The Coleridge Way is a 51-mile (82 km) long-distance trail in Somerset and Devon, England.

It was opened in April 2005, and the route links several sites associated with the poet Samuel Taylor Coleridge starting from Coleridge Cottage at Nether Stowey. Originally the route finished at Porlock but on 21 May 2014 an extension to Lynmouth was launched. Walkers have the option of continuing along the South West Coast Path into the Valley of the Rocks and Poets Shelter.

The footpath is waymarked. It starts in the Quantock Hills (England's first Area of Outstanding Natural Beauty), passing through the villages of Holford, West Quantoxhead and Bicknoller before moving onto the Brendon Hills, within Exmoor National Park, through the villages of Monksilver, Roadwater, and Luxborough, across Lype Hill to Wheddon Cross. The route then crosses an area of moorland at Dunkery Hill to the woodland village of Horner and moves towards the coast at Porlock on the Bristol Channel. From here the route climbs through Worthy Woods before descending into the Doone Valley passing Oare, Malmsmead, Brendon and Watersmeet before finishing by the Pavilion National Park Centre in Lynmouth where it intersects with the South West Coast Path. The landscapes include heathland, moorland, deciduous and coniferous woodland, farmland, deeply wooded valleys.

In May 2007 The Coleridge Bridle Way was launched providing a horse riding route between Nether Stowey and Exford and includes over 4 miles (6.4 km) of bridleways.

Most of the Way is an easy walk, though there are several sections that are moderate. (One small lane on the way between Roadwater and Wheddon Cross is hazardous when wet, which it often is.) The initial section out of Porlock is challenging and may prove a problem for elderly walkers. Some of the maps and guides to the path are dated in that they may omit features that have changed, such as the addition of road.

In 2008 the Way was selected by The Times as one of Britain's best autumn walks.

== See also ==
- Long-distance footpaths in the UK
