= Countisbury =

Village in Devon, England

Coordinates: 51.232°N 3.796°W

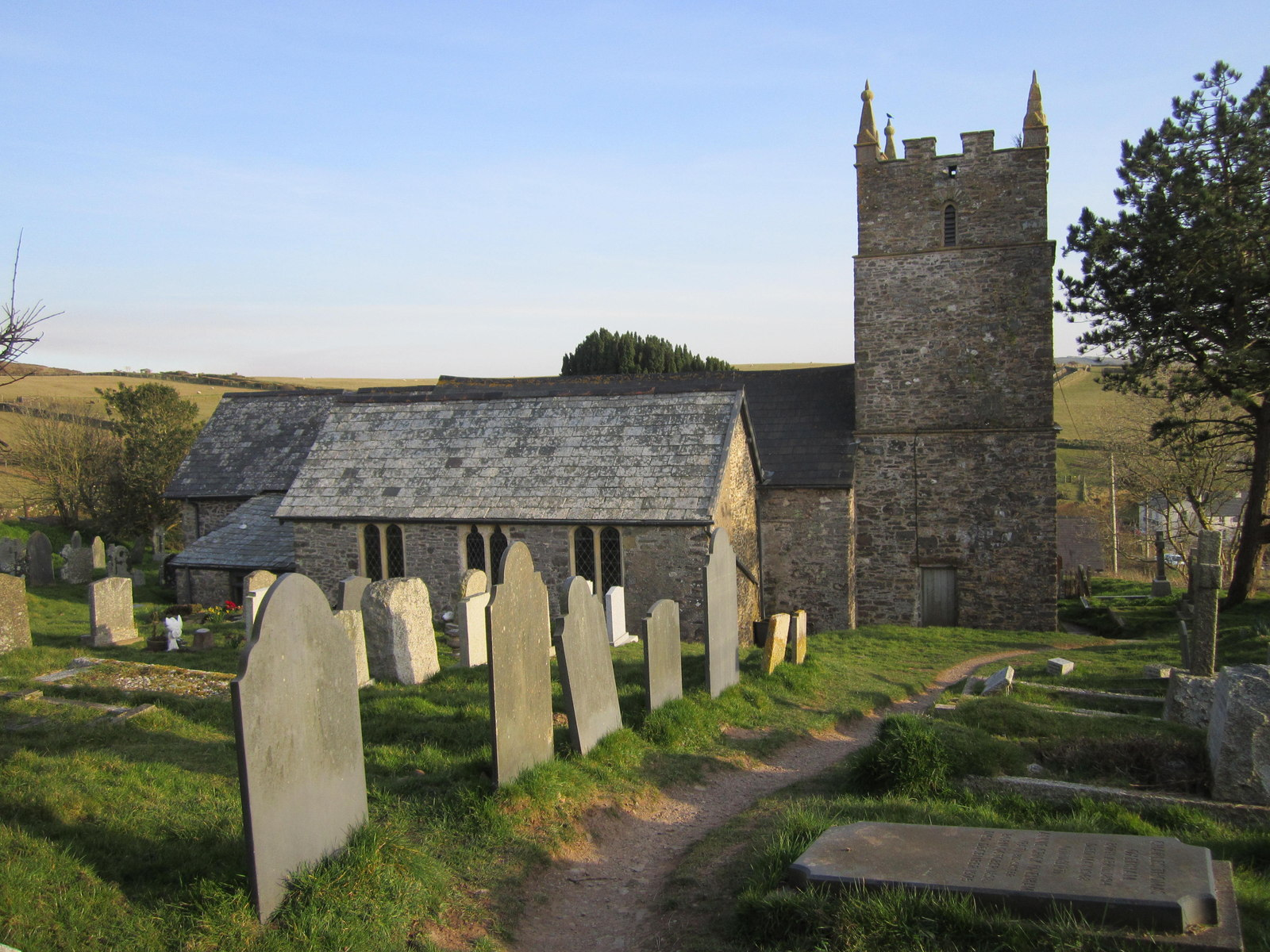
- St John the Evangelist Church

- Location within Devon
- Population: 66 (2001 census)
- Civil parish: Brendon and Countisbury
- District: North Devon
- Shire county: Devon
- Region: South West
- Country: England
- Sovereign state: United Kingdom

Countisbury is a village and former civil parish, now in the parish of Brendon and Countisbury, in the North Devon district, in the county of Devon, England. It is on Exmoor, roughly two miles east of Lynmouth along the A39. It has a church and pub. The National Trust owns the other buildings. In 2001 the parish had a population of 66.

On 1 April 2013 the parish was abolished and merged with Brendon to form "Brendon and Countisbury".

Scholars now believe the Iron Age promontory fort of Wind Hill on Countisbury Hill was the site of the Battle of Cynuit in 878.
