= East Lyn Valley =

Valley of Exmoor, England

Coordinates: 51°13′27″N 3°43′48″W

East Lyn Valley is a valley of Exmoor, covering northern Devon and western Somerset, England.

The East Lyn River is formed from several main tributaries including Hoar Oak Water beginning near Weir Water. Its mouth is at Lynmouth at the confluence with the West Lyn River. The valley is abundant with wildlife, including dippers, grey wagtails and heron. During the Ice Age glacial erosion eroded one side of the valley resulting in the steep valley which is seen today. This was responsible for floods in the valley in 1952.

The area was the setting for Lorna Doone by R. D. Blackmore and James Herbert's The Secret of Crickley Hall. The church at Oare appeared in the novel. St Brendan's church in the village of Brendon also overlooks the valley; the current building dates to 1738.

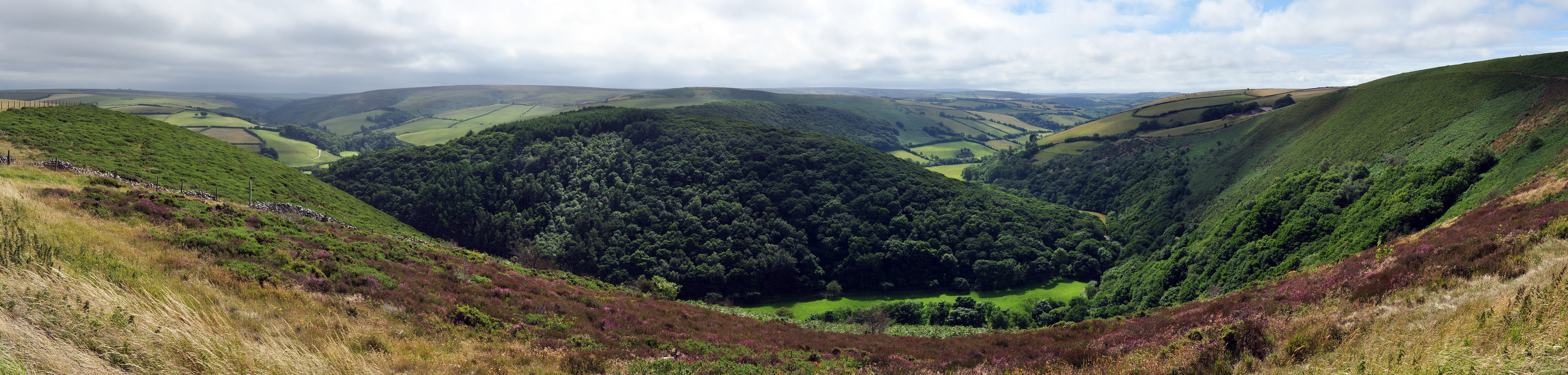
East Lyn Valley. To the east (left) is Somerset, to the west (right) Devon
