= Brendon, Devon =

Village in Devon, England

Coordinates: 51.220°N 3.764°W

Brendon
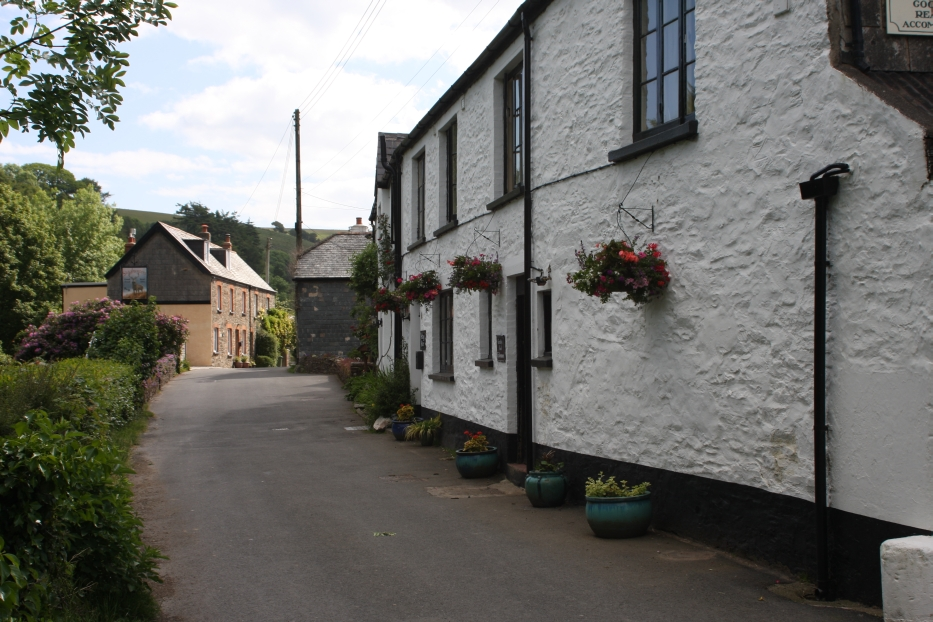
- Main road through Brendon

- Location within Devon
- Population: 159
- OS grid reference: SS769482
- Civil parish: Brendon and Countisbury
- District: North Devon
- Shire county: Devon
- Region: South West
- Country: England
- Sovereign state: United Kingdom
- Post town: LYNTON
- Postcode district: EX35
- Dialling code: 01598
- Police: Devon and Cornwall
- Fire: Devon and Somerset
- Ambulance: South Western
- UK Parliament: North Devon (UK Parliament constituency)

Brendon is a village and former civil parish, now in the parish of Brendon and Countisbury, in the North Devon district, in the county of Devon, England. It is close to the border with Somerset within the Exmoor National Park, the village is 1.5 miles (2.4 km) southeast of Lynton and 15 miles (24 km) west of Minehead in the East Lyn Valley. It is located just off the A39 and is on two long distance footpaths, the Coleridge Way and the Samaritans Way South West. The Church of St Brendon is 2 mi (3.2 km) from the village and was built in 1738, possibly with building material brought from another site. In 2001 the parish had a population of 159.

== The village ==
The Church of St. Brendon was built in 1738, possibly using the stones from the original church at Cheriton. It lies midway between Cheriton and Brendon, about two miles (3 km) from each, and has a tower and four bells. The church was further restored in the nineteenth century and houses a Norman font. There is a sundial above the porch dated 1707.

The village is located just off the A39, the parish of Brendon is roughly square in shape and is defined by the East Lyn River to the north, the Hoaroak Water to the west and the Badgworthy Water to the east; a tributary of the latter, the Hoccombe Water defines part of its southern boundary. Brendon Common occupies a part of the moorland area which characterises the south of the parish. Badgeworthy Water is crossed by the 17th century packhorse Malmsmead Bridge.

== History ==
The name contains two Old English place-name elements, the first – from brom – referring to the plant broom and the second – from dun – which tends to signify a fairly extensive and flat hill or upland expanse. It is recorded in the Domesday Book as Brandone. It is not connected with the Brendon Hills in Somerset, the name of which has a different origin.

White's Devonshire Directory (1850) describes Brendon as follows:

A small village 1½ miles SE of Lynton & 15 miles W of Minehead is in a picturesque valley of the river Lyn, has in its parish 271 souls & 6733 acres of land including Leeford hamlet & a large tract of moorland on the borders of Somersetshire where the rivers Exe, Lyn and Barle have their sources. F. W. Knight Esq. is the Lord of the mannor owner of most of the soil, and patron of the rectory ... valued in 1831 at £148. The Rev. T. Roe of Oare, Somerset is the incumbent, and has 57a, 2r, 22p, of glebe. The parsonage is a small cottage, and the church [St. Brendon] is an ancient structure with a tower and 4 bells.

Brendon is home to the Exmoor Folk Festival, and is both on the route of the Coleridge Way and the Samaritans Way South West.

On 1 April 2013 the parish was abolished and merged with Countisbury to form "Brendon and Countisbury".

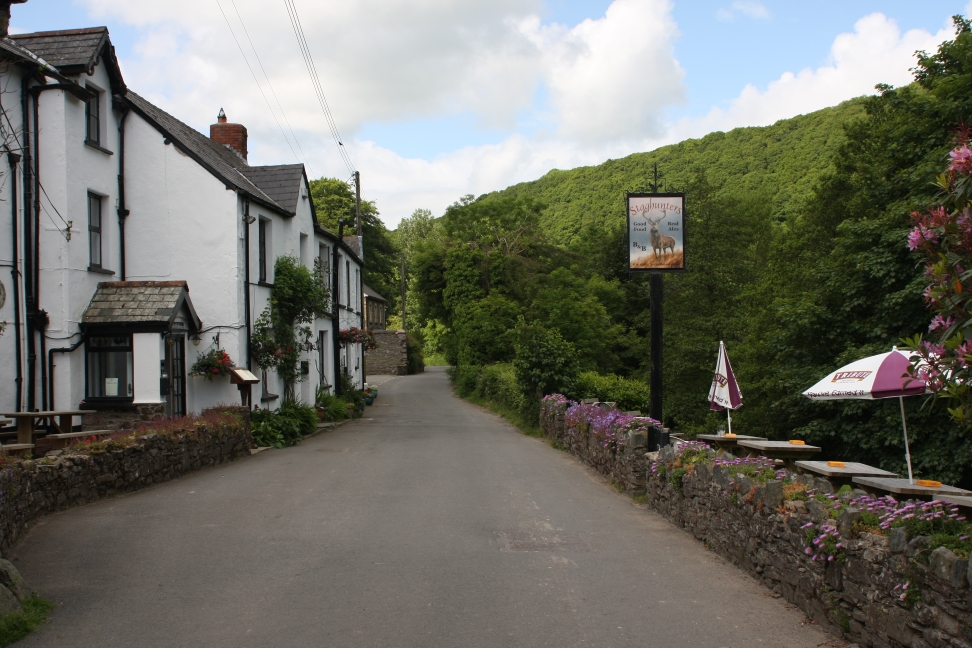
The Stag Hunters Inn

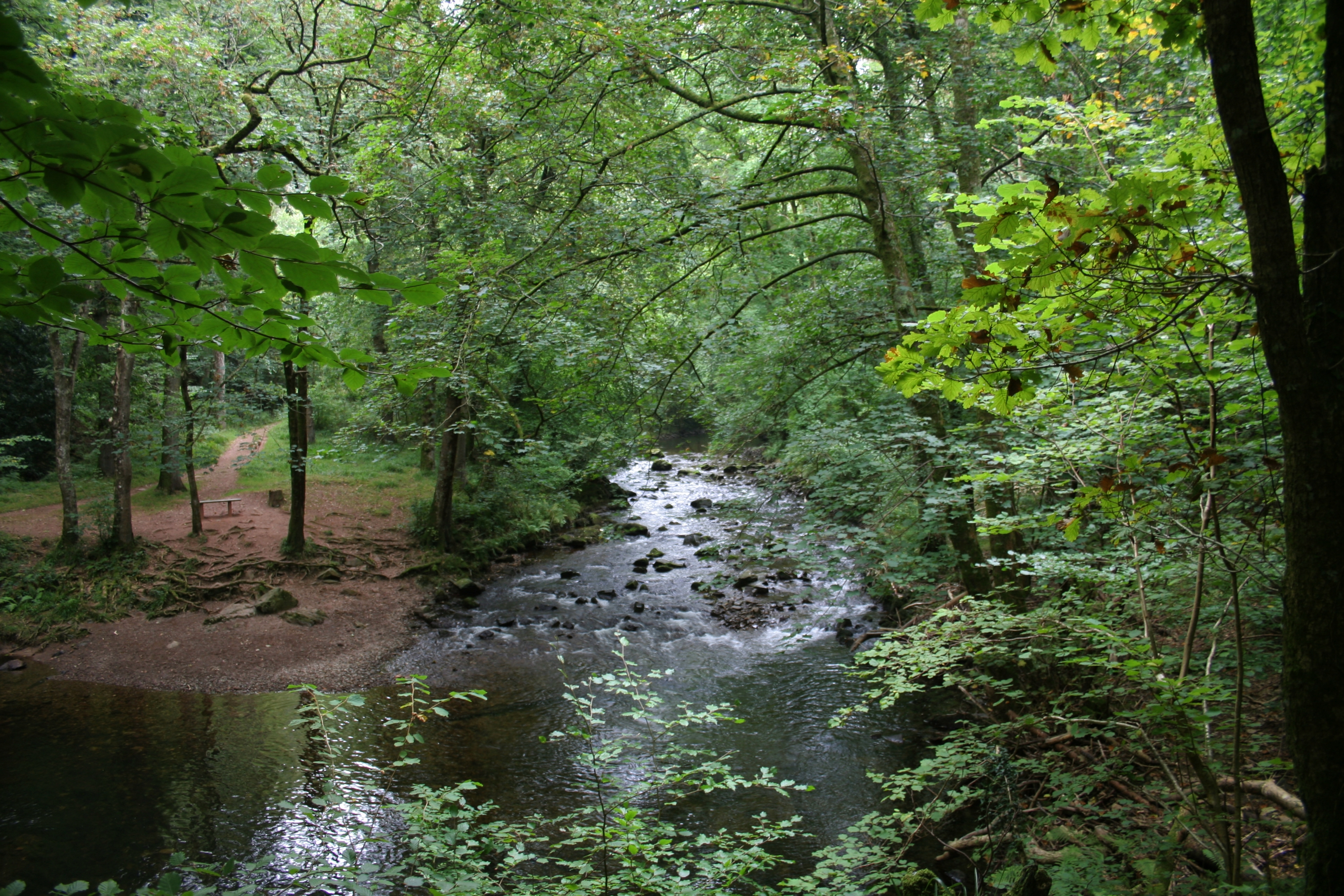
The East Lyn River

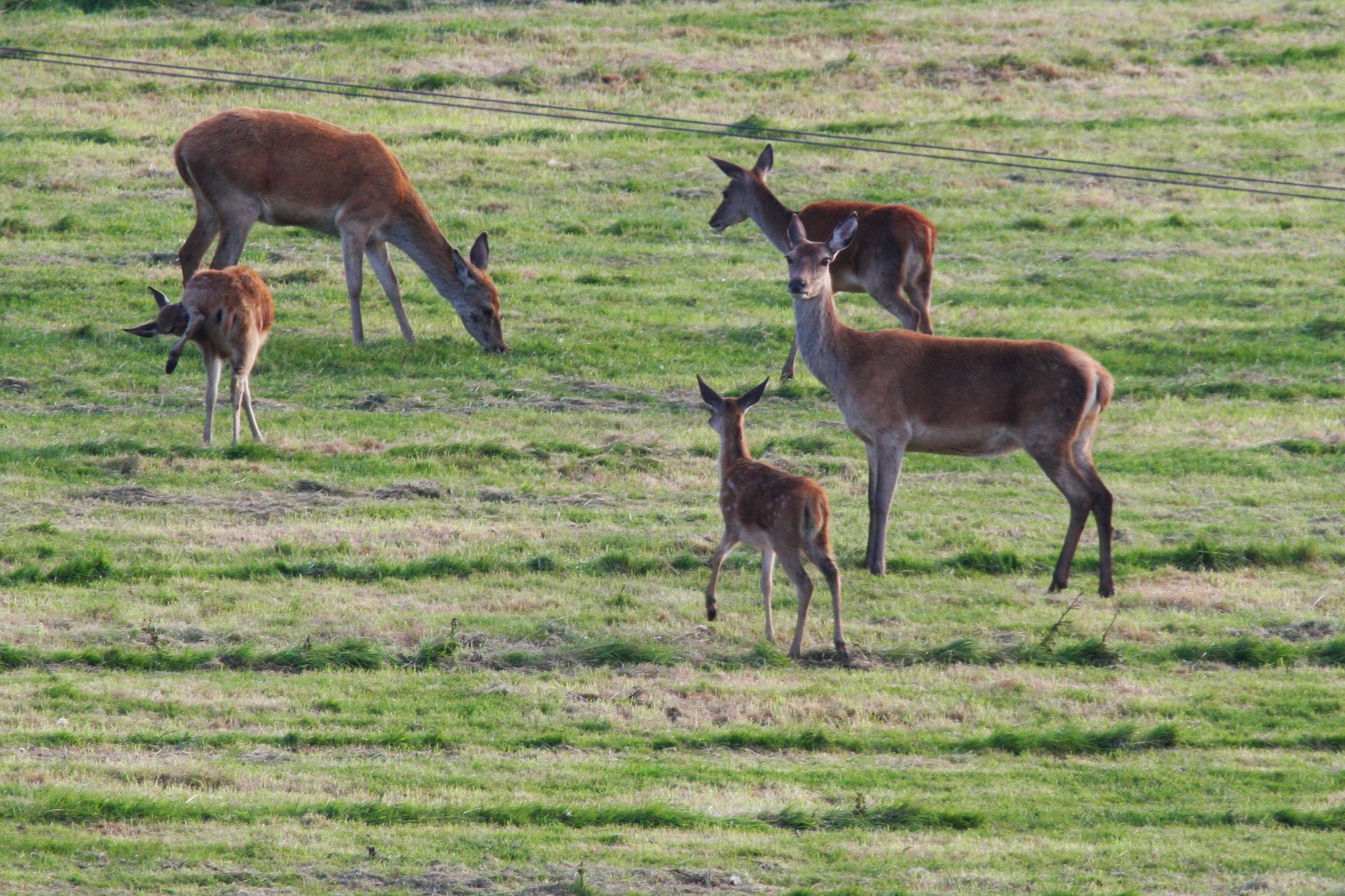
Deer on the hillside over Brendon
