= Windhill (disambiguation) =

Windhill is a hamlet in Ross and Cromarty, in the Highland council area of Scotland.

Windhill may also refer to:

- Windhill, West Yorkshire, in Bradford, West Yorkshire, England
- Windhill, Staincross, in Barnsley, South Yorkshire, England
- Windhill, Mexborough, in Doncaster, South Yorkshire, England

== See also ==
- Wind Hill
- Windhill Green
