= Coleridge Cottage =

Historic cottage in Nether Stowey, Somerset, England

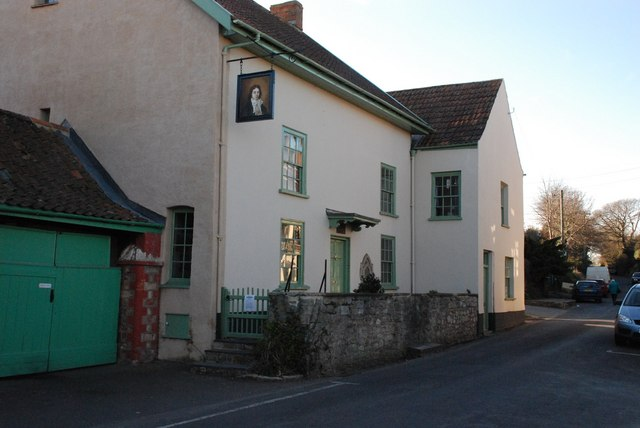
- Coleridge Cottage at 35, Lime Street, Nether Stowey

- Location within Somerset and the United Kingdom
- Established: 1998
- Location: Nether Stowey, Somerset
- Coordinates: 51.1522°N 3.1579°W
- Website: Coleridge Cottage information at the National Trust

Coleridge Cottage is a cottage situated in Nether Stowey, Bridgwater, Somerset, England. It is a grade II* listed building. The 17th century cottage was originally two buildings which were later combined and expanded.

In 1797 the poet Samuel Taylor Coleridge rented the cottage. While he lived there he wrote many of his better known works. He was visited by William Wordsworth and other early members of the Romantic movement. Coleridge moved out in 1799 and the building was refurbished. Almost 100 years after his occupation some of his admirers leased the property and eventually bought it, after a national campaign and significant private funding. In 1909 they handed it over to the National Trust who have run it as a writer's home museum since then. In the later 20th and early 21st centuries further renovation and expansion was undertaken. Since then, it has won awards as a tourist attraction.

The cottage is the starting point for the long-distance trail the Coleridge Way which runs west for 51 miles (82 km) to Lynmouth.

== History ==
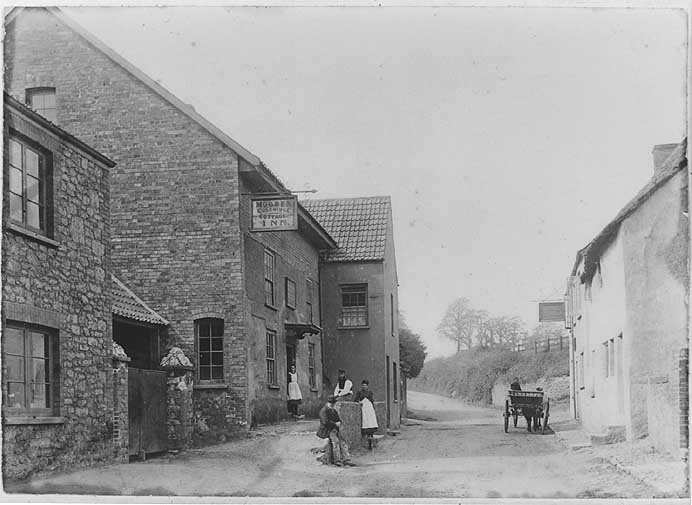
The cottage when it was 'Moore's Coleridge Cottage Inn', around 1890

The cottage was constructed in the 17th century as two attached buildings. One contained a parlour, kitchen and service room on the ground floor and three corresponding bed chambers above, and an adjoining byre or barn.

The poet Samuel Taylor Coleridge rented the cottage for three years from 1797. As well as writing poetry he was a literary critic and philosopher who, with his friend William Wordsworth, was a founder of the Romantic Movement in England and a member of the Lake Poets. It was while he was living in Nether Stowey that Coleridge wrote This Lime-Tree Bower My Prison, The Rime of the Ancient Mariner, part of Christabel, and Frost at Midnight. While writing Kubla Khan; or, A Vision in a Dream: A Fragment, Coleridge was said to have been interrupted by the arrival of "a person on business from Porlock". It is unclear whether this really happened or was part of a dream but has become a literary allusion for unwanted intruders who disrupt inspired creativity. During Coleridge's time at the house William Wordsworth visited him and subsequently rented Alfoxton Park, a little over 3 miles (4.8 km) away. There are references to the cottage in several of Coleridge's poems, including To The Rev G Coleridge (lines 52–61), This Lime Tree Bower My Prison; Frost at Midnight; and Fears in Solitude (lines 221–226).

The cottage was refurbished in 1800 and run as an inn. Further major work took place in the second half of the 19th century when rooms were added at the back of the building and the roof was raised. In 1893 a committee of Coleridge's admirers took a lease on the property for 15 years at £15 per annum, however by 1896 an appeal had been launched to try to raise more money for the lease or eventual purchase, with the threat that it could be removed to America. They installed the commemorative plaque on the wall which was unveiled on 9 June 1893. By 1908 the campaign, chaired by the Earl of Lytton, had gained public support including that of the archbishops of Canterbury and York, and raised the funds needed to purchase the property.

== National Trust ownership ==
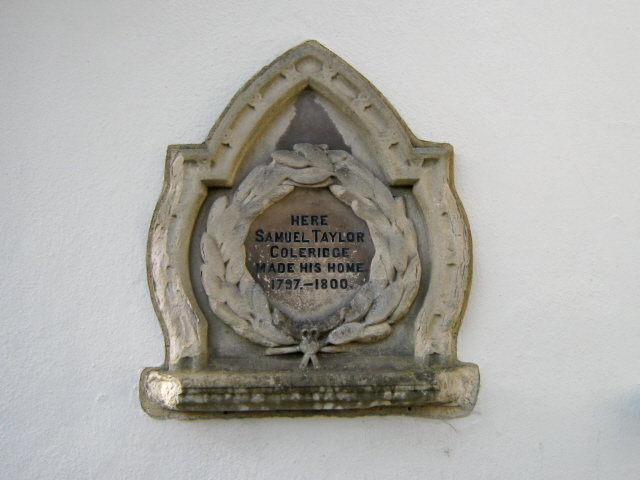
Commemorative plaque installed in 1893.

Having served for many years as 'Moore's Coleridge Cottage Inn', the building was acquired for the nation in 1908, and the following year it was handed over to the National Trust. On 23 May 1998, following a £25,000 appeal by the Friends of Coleridge and the National Trust, two further rooms on the first floor were officially opened by Lord Coleridge a descendant of Samuel Taylor Coleridge. In 2011 the National Trust undertook a major re-presentation project that also saw the opening of additional rooms. The oldest parts of the cottage are now presented as the Coleridge family might have known them, with the original inglenook fireplace in the parlour uncovered and working once more. The garden was opened to visitors for the first time, complete with an 18th-century vegetable plot, a wildflower area and representations of Coleridge's animals. It is possible to listen to poetry at audio posts around the garden and the well is operational once more and can be seen in the small courtyard behind the cottage. A number of mementos of Coleridge are on display including his inkstand, locks of his hair and correspondence in his handwriting.

In 2013 the cottage won 'Gold' in the 'Best Small Visitor Attraction' category at the South West Tourism Awards and in May 2014 won 'Silver' at the Visit England Awards in the same category.

== See also ==
- List of National Trust properties in Somerset
- 3, The Grove, Highgate
