= Nether Stowey =

Village in Somerset, England

Coordinates: 51.152°N 3.154°W

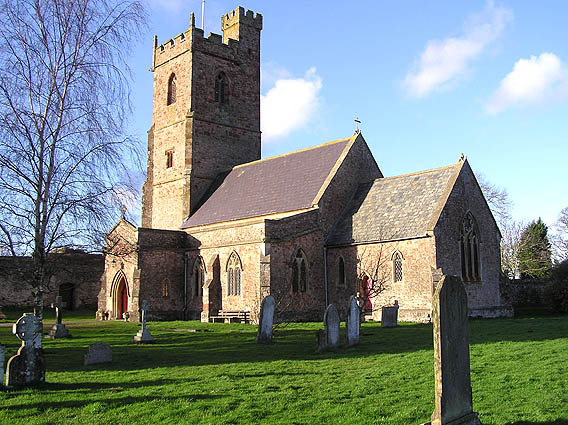
- Church of St Mary the Virgin, Nether Stowey

- Location within Somerset
- Population: 1,373
- OS grid reference: ST194398
- Unitary authority: Somerset Council
- Ceremonial county: Somerset
- Region: South West
- Country: England
- Sovereign state: United Kingdom
- Post town: BRIDGWATER
- Postcode district: TA5
- Dialling code: 01278
- Police: Avon and Somerset
- Fire: Devon and Somerset
- Ambulance: South Western
- UK Parliament: Bridgwater

Nether Stowey is a large village in Somerset, South West England. It sits in the foothills of the Quantock Hills (England's first Area of Outstanding Natural Beauty), just below Over Stowey. The parish of Nether Stowey covers approximately 4 km^{2}, with a population of 1,482 (2021 census).

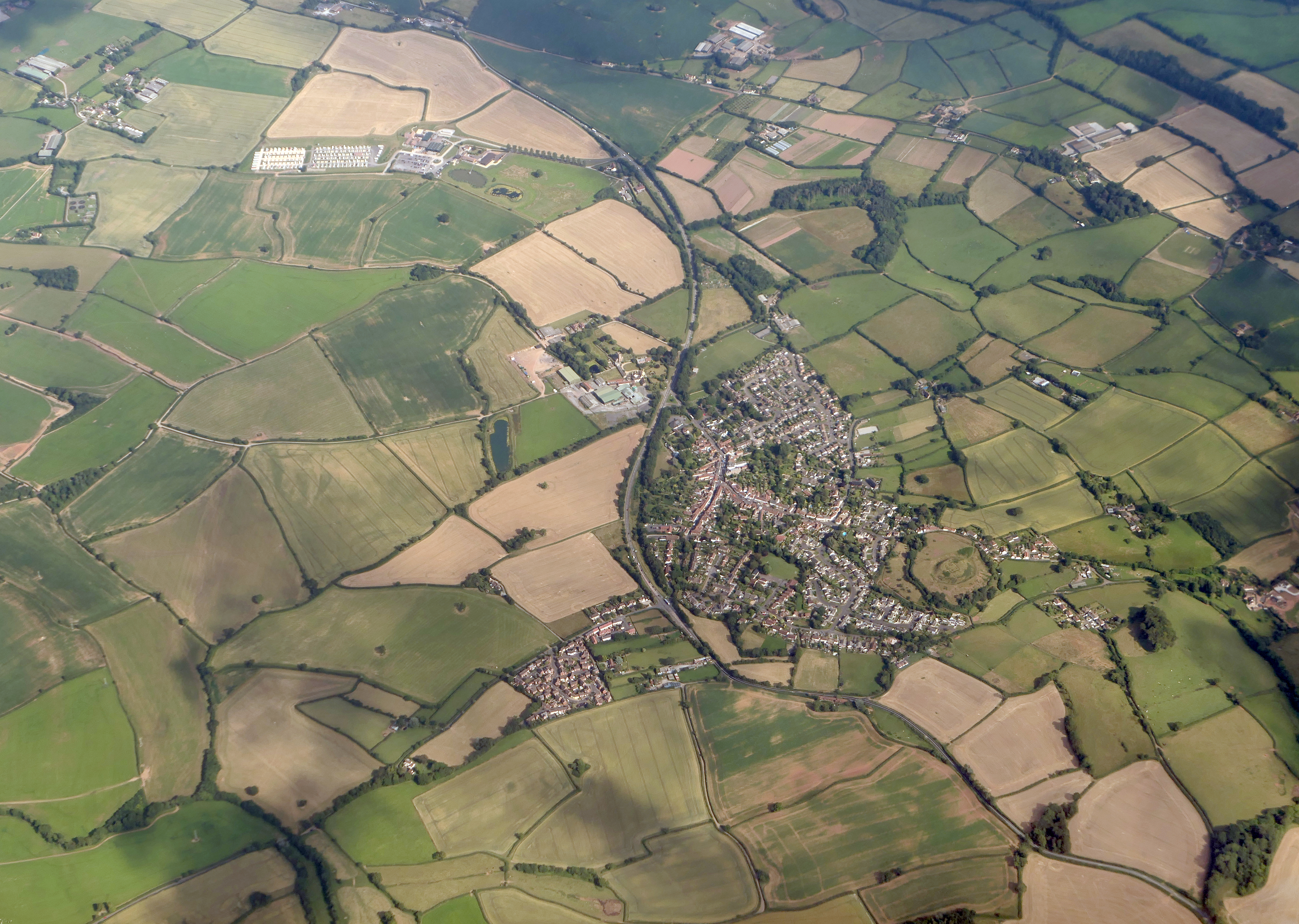
Aerial view.

== History ==
The Iron Age fort of Dowsborough lies about one and a half miles west of the village.

In the Domesday Book of 1086 it was recorded as Stawei, the name coming from the Old English stan weg, or paved road.

The parish of Nether Stowey was part of the Williton and Freemanners Hundred.

Nether Stowey may have been a borough as early as 1157 or 1158 but by 1225 it is officially recorded as such. The economy of the medieval town was based on textiles and pottery, and it had both a weekly market and a yearly fair after 1304.

During the "Bloody Assizes" in the autumn of 1685, in the aftermath of Duke of Monmouth's Rebellion, men from Nether Stowey who were caught up in the rebellion are said to have been hanged, drawn and quartered in the village after they were sentenced to death by Judge Jeffries. Their body parts were then displayed around the village to discourage others from rebellion against the King. Many villages throughout the South West were witness to the same bloody retribution.

== Governance ==
The parish council has responsibility for local issues, including setting an annual precept (local rate) to cover the council's operating costs and producing annual accounts for public scrutiny. The parish council evaluates local planning applications and works with the local police, district council officers, and neighbourhood watch groups on matters of crime, security, and traffic. The parish council's role also includes initiating projects for the maintenance and repair of parish facilities, as well as consulting with the district council on the maintenance, repair, and improvement of highways, drainage, footpaths, public transport, and street cleaning. Conservation matters (including trees and listed buildings) and environmental issues are also the responsibility of the council.

For local government purposes, since 1 April 2023, the village comes under the unitary authority of Somerset Council. Prior to this, it was part of the non-metropolitan district of Sedgemoor, which was formed on 1 April 1974 under the Local Government Act 1972, having previously been part of Bridgwater Rural District.

The village is part of the 'Quantocks' electoral ward. The ward stretches from Nether Stowey north east to Stockland Bristol and south east to Goathurst. The total ward population at the 2011 census was 4,471.

It is also part of the Bridgwater county constituency represented in the House of Commons of the Parliament of the United Kingdom. It elects one Member of Parliament (MP) by the first past the post system of election.

== Notable buildings ==
=== Castle ===
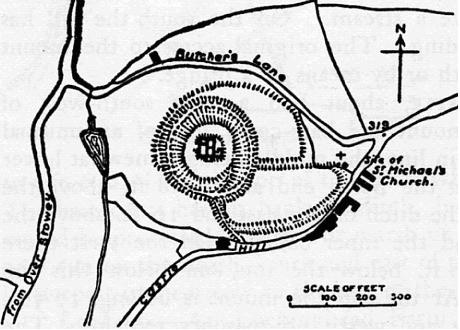
Stowey Castle

Stowey Castle is a Norman motte-and-bailey castle, built in the 11th century. The blue lias rubble walling is the only visible structural remains of the castle which stand on a conical earthwork with a ditch approximately 250 metres (820 ft) in circumference. The castle was destroyed in the 15th century, which may have been as a penalty for the local Lord Audley's involvement in the Second Cornish Uprising of 1497 led by Perkin Warbeck.

The castle is a scheduled monument and the foundations of the keep are a Grade I listed building.

=== Church ===
The Church of St Mary the Virgin has a 15th-century tower, with the remainder of the church being rebuilt in 1851 by Richard Carver and Charles Edmund Giles. It has been designated as a Grade II* listed building.

=== Stowey Court ===
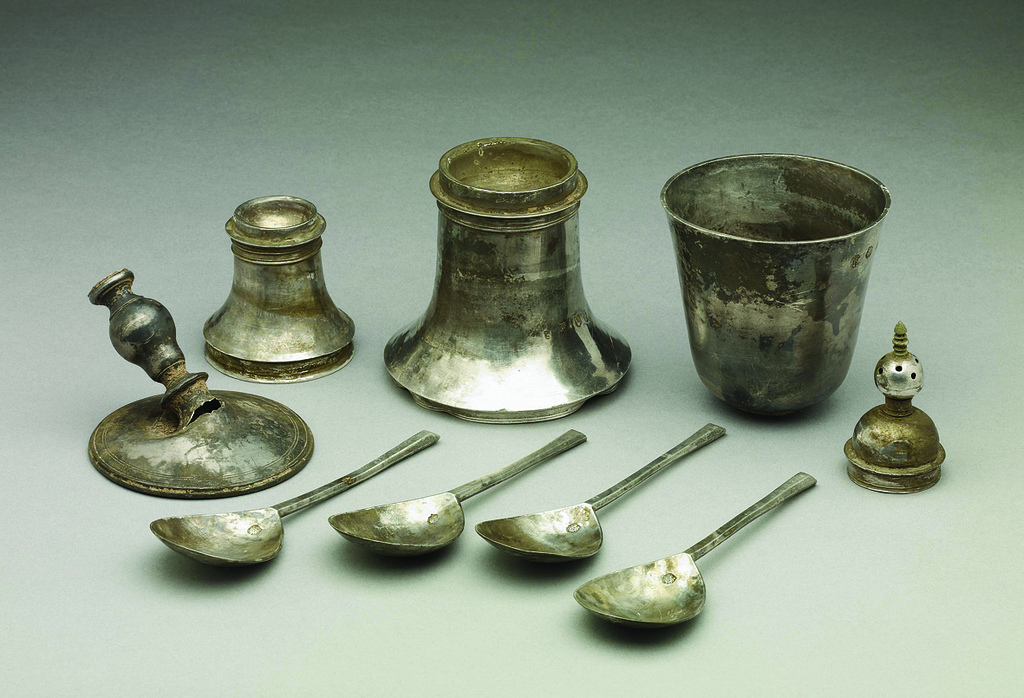
The Nether Stowey hoard dates from the English Civil War.

Stowey Court may contain part of Lord Audley's original house which was left unfinished after his execution in 1497 until his descendants rebuilt the half-finished dwelling. Most of the current building is 19th and 20th-century. In 2008 the British Museum exhibited a hoard of silverware that was found near Stowey Court. The spoons, a goblet and a bell shaped salt cellars are thought to date from the time of the English Civil War and they were recently discovered in a broken earthenware jar using a metal detector.

Stowey Court is a Grade II listed building.

=== Coleridge Cottage ===
Coleridge Cottage was, between 1797 and 1799, the home of Samuel Taylor Coleridge, one of the founders of the Romantic Movement in poetry (along with William Wordsworth, who himself lived three miles away). It was here he wrote the poems The Rime of the Ancient Mariner and Kubla Khan.

The cottage is a Grade II* listed building.

The Coleridge Way starts at the cottage and celebrates his walks in the area.

=== Poole House ===
Poole House is thought to have been built in the late 17th century although some parts may be even older. Local tanner, politician and philanthropist Thomas Poole lived in the house in the late 18th and early 19th century. Poole provided a cottage, Coleridge Cottage, for the use of the romantic poet Samuel Taylor Coleridge. Coleridge spent much time in Poole House, reading and writing in the barrel room. William Wordsworth and his sister were also frequent visitors.

Poole House is now a grade II listed building and many original features remain including fireplaces and the Georgian interior.

=== Clock Tower ===
The Clock Tower in St Mary Street was built in 1897. During 2011, the Clock Tower underwent a major refurbishment job which saw the replacement of several components of the bell chiming system. The tower also received a fresh coat of paint.

The Clock Tower is a Grade II* listed building.

== Notable residents ==
In July 1789, local resident John Walford murdered his wife after a visit to Castle of Comfort Farm (a pub that still exists). He was tried and found guilty. He was executed in the spot where he committed his crime and hung in a gibbet. Walford's gibbet is a local landmark. The cage in which he was hung is now held at the Museum of Somerset in Taunton. Walford attained notoriety due to the brutality of the crime in an otherwise quiet and peaceful village. His relatives still live in the village to this day.

Thomas Poole was a local tanner who became wealthy and founded the Nether Stowey Women's Friendly Society in 1807. The Society continued (under several different names) until 1975 and is still celebrated annually. Poole was also a patron of Coleridge and Wordsworth.

The village was the birthplace of Jesuit priest Robert Parsons.

The poet Samuel Taylor Coleridge lived in the village between 1797 and 1799, as noted above.

== Twinning ==
The village is twinned with Theillay in the Loir-et-Cher department of France, and the Nether Stowey Twinning Association was established in 1996 by Glyn Legge and Steve Darch. Every year Theillay and Nether Stowey organise an annual trip to each village, taking turns every year.
