= Oare Water =

River in Somerset, England

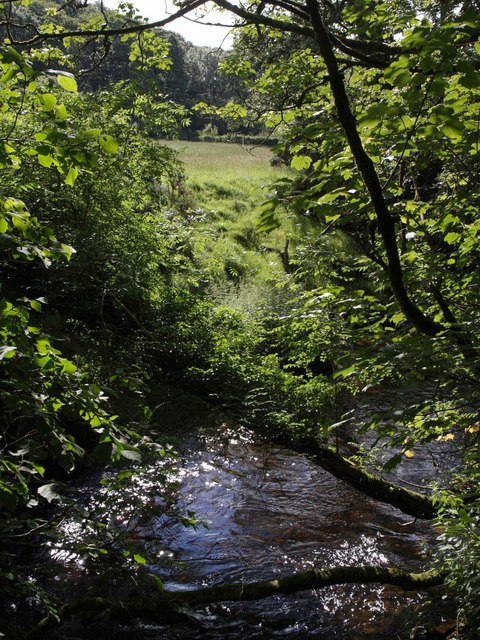

Location
- Country: England
- County: Somerset

Physical characteristics
- Source
  - location: Somerset, England
  - coordinates: 51°11′08″N 3°42′39″W
- Mouth: East Lyn River
  - location: Somerset, England
  - coordinates: 51°13′05″N 3°43′42″W

Oare Water passes through the village of Oare, on Exmoor in Somerset, England.

It joins Badgworthy Water before flowing to Watersmeet and the Bristol Channel, as the East Lyn River.

Oare bridge is an 18th-century road bridge over Oare Water.
