= Malmsmead Bridge =

Bridge in Devon and Somerset, England

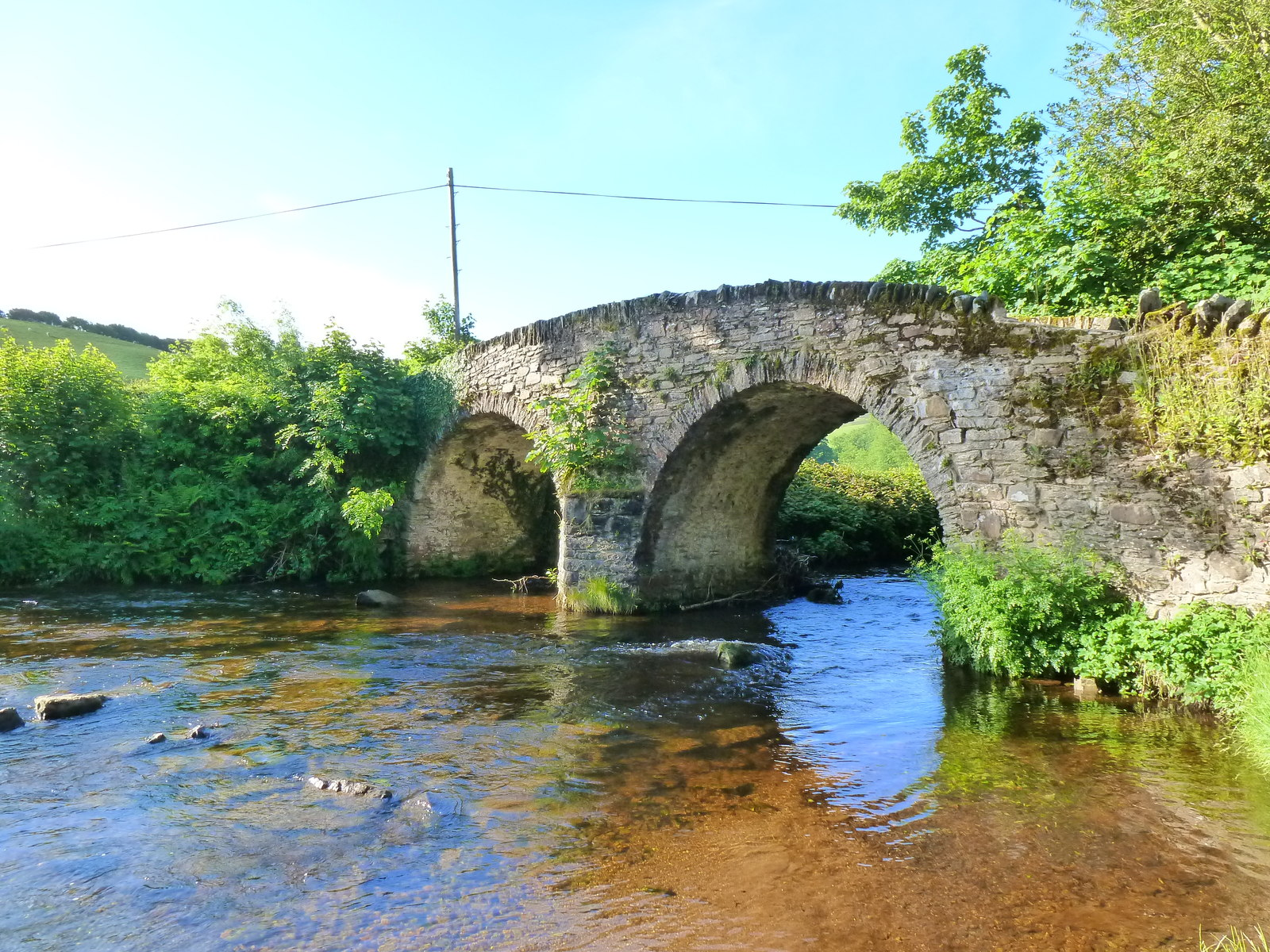
- Coordinates: 51.2159°N 3.7311°W
- Carries: Road
- Crosses: Badgworthy Water

Characteristics
- Design: Arch bridge
- No. of spans: 2

History
- Construction end: 17th century

Location
- Interactive map of Malmsmead Bridge

Malmsmead Bridge is a 17th-century stone bridge which crosses Badgworthy Water in the hamlet of Malmsmead, on the road between Oare and Brendon. The Badgworthy Water forms the boundary between the counties of Somerset and Devon, and the bridge is therefore shared between both counties, as well as being within the Exmoor National Park. It has been scheduled as an ancient monument and is a Grade II listed building.

The bridge has two round arches each of which is 8 feet 6 inches (2.59 m) wide.
