= The Grove, Highgate =

Street in Camden, London

The Grove
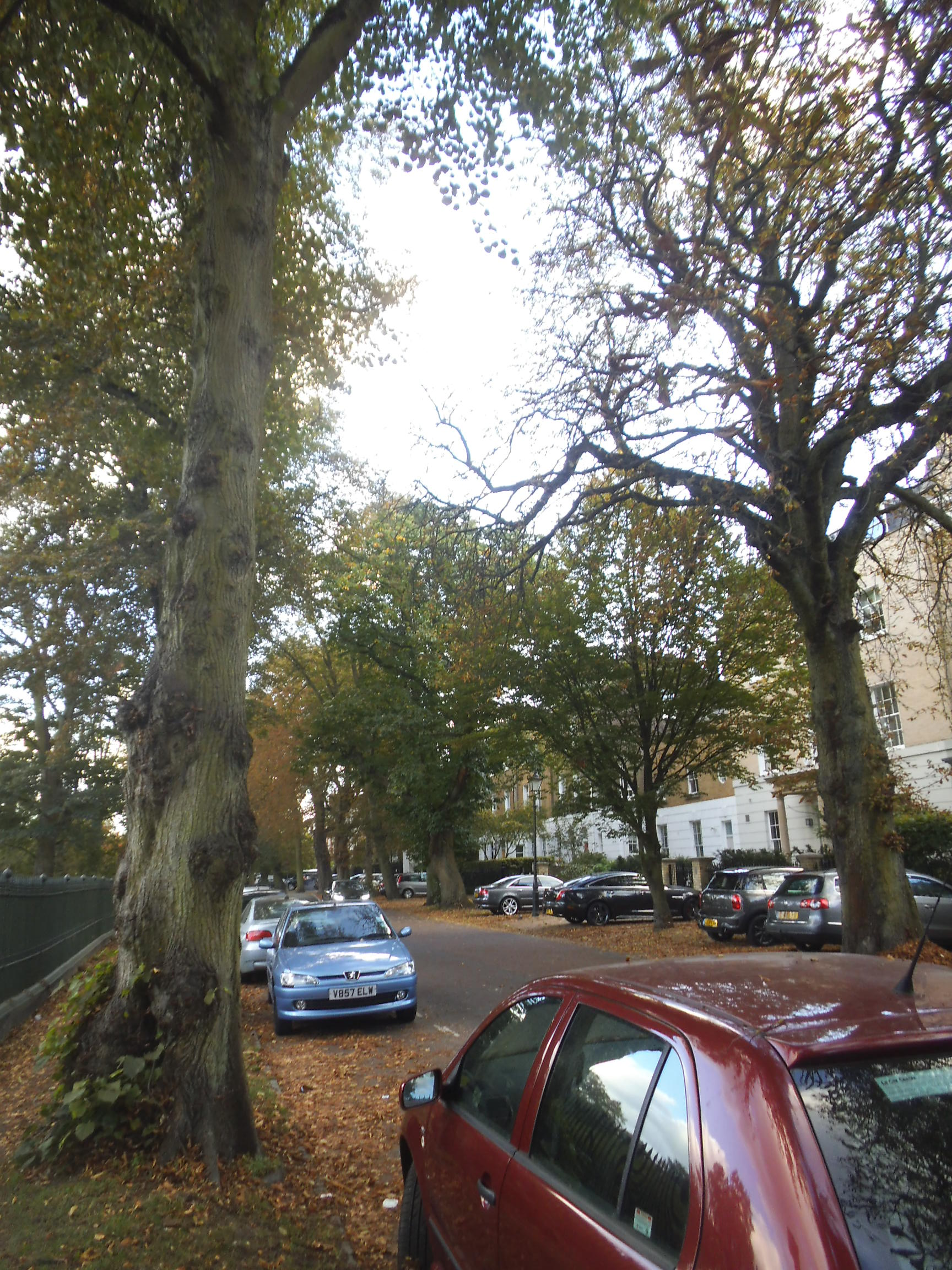
- The street in 2014
- Interactive map of The Grove
- Location: Highgate, London, England
- Postal code: N6
- Coordinates: 51.5704°N 0.1515°W
- North: Hampstead Lane
- East: Highgate West Hill
- South: Highgate West Hill
- West: Fitzroy Park

Other
- Known for: Notable residents; listed buildings

The Grove is a short, tree-lined street in Highgate, north London, running north from Highgate West Hill to Hampstead Lane, known for the notable residents who have lived there over several centuries.

== Early development ==
The line of The Grove follows the eastern boundary of an estate which at the beginning of the 17th century belonged to the Warner family, several members of which held prominent positions in the City of London. The Estate's Tudor mansion was Dorchester House, described in 1620 as The Blewhouse, which stood in what is now the courtyard of Witanhurst, the palatial mansion on Highgate West Hill whose entrance marks the southern end of The Grove.

Dorchester House came into the possession of William Blake in the mid-17th century, who in 1688 built Nos. 1–6 The Grove in the part of its garden nearer the house, having earlier leased an acre at the rear of the garden on which Sir Francis Pemberton built Grove House a decade earlier. This house was later demolished to make way for the remainder of the houses on the west side of the street, Nos. 7–13, built from the early 19th century.

The old village green, and one of its three ponds, occupied most of the east side of the street until 1844, when the New River Company acquired the land for a covered reservoir to supply the Village with piped water for the first time. South of the covered reservoir small remnants of the village green survive, whilst on the north east side of the street there are two modest apartment buildings, Old Well House and Fitzroy Lodge.

All the buildings in The Grove are listed, either Grade II or II*, apart from Nos. 12 and 13 which were built in 2015 and Old Well House, built in the early 20th century.

== Notable former residents ==
- No. 1: Actress Gladys Cooper and her husband, publisher Neville Pearson; journalist Patrick Sergeant
- No. 2: Violinist Yehudi Menuhin; musician Sting and his wife, actress Trudie Styler
- No. 3: Poet Samuel Taylor Coleridge; playwright J. B. Priestley; model Kate Moss
- No. 4: Diplomat and managing editor of The Times, Sir Campbell Stuart, GCMG, KBE, KStJ; executive Cob Stenham and daughters, the eldest of whom is playwright Polly Stenham; TV chef, restaurateur, and cookbook author, Jamie Oliver
- No. 5: Appeal judge Sir Edward Fry and children: artist Roger, social reformer Joan, illustrator Agnes and prison reformer Margery; musician George Michael
- No. 6: Musician Annie Lennox and her husband, film producer Uri Fruchtmann
- No. 7: Manager of the Marine Insurance Co., Robert John Lodge, who was also treasurer of the Highgate Literary and Scientific Institution (1880–1893)
- No. 8: Actors Robert Donat and Renée Asherson, librettist and playwright Christopher Hassall.
- No. 9: Politician Beresford Craddock; spy Anthony Blunt; industrialist John Sutton Nettlefold, poet and dramatist John Drinkwater.
- Fitzroy Lodge: Scottish comedian Stanley Baxter

== Gallery ==
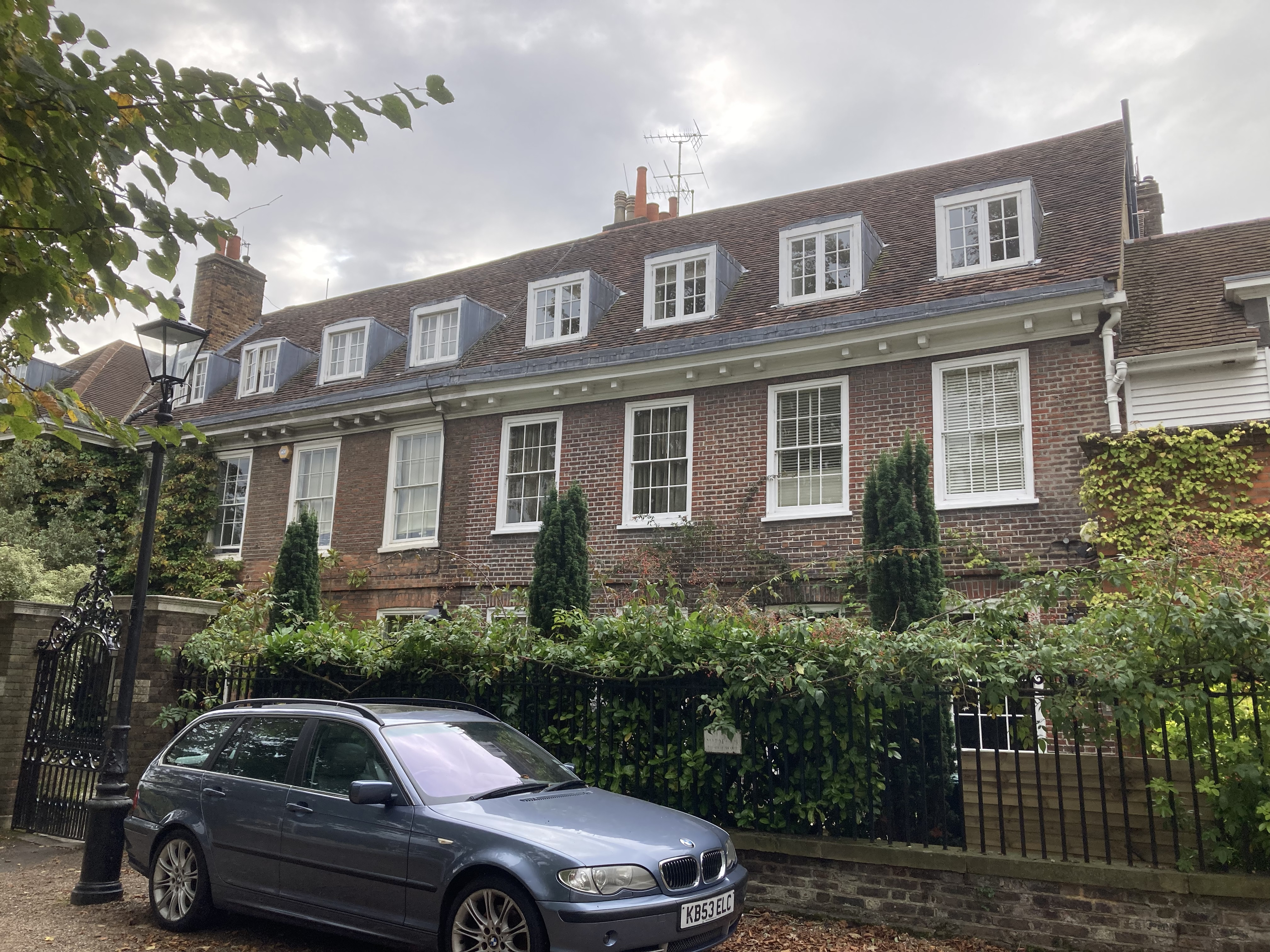
1 and 2 The Grove

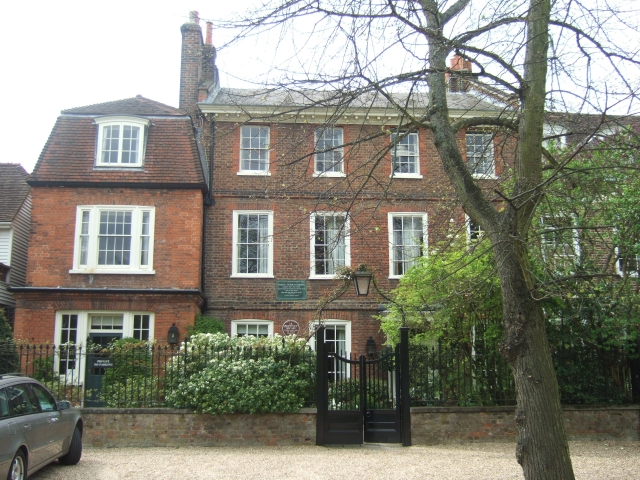
3 The Grove

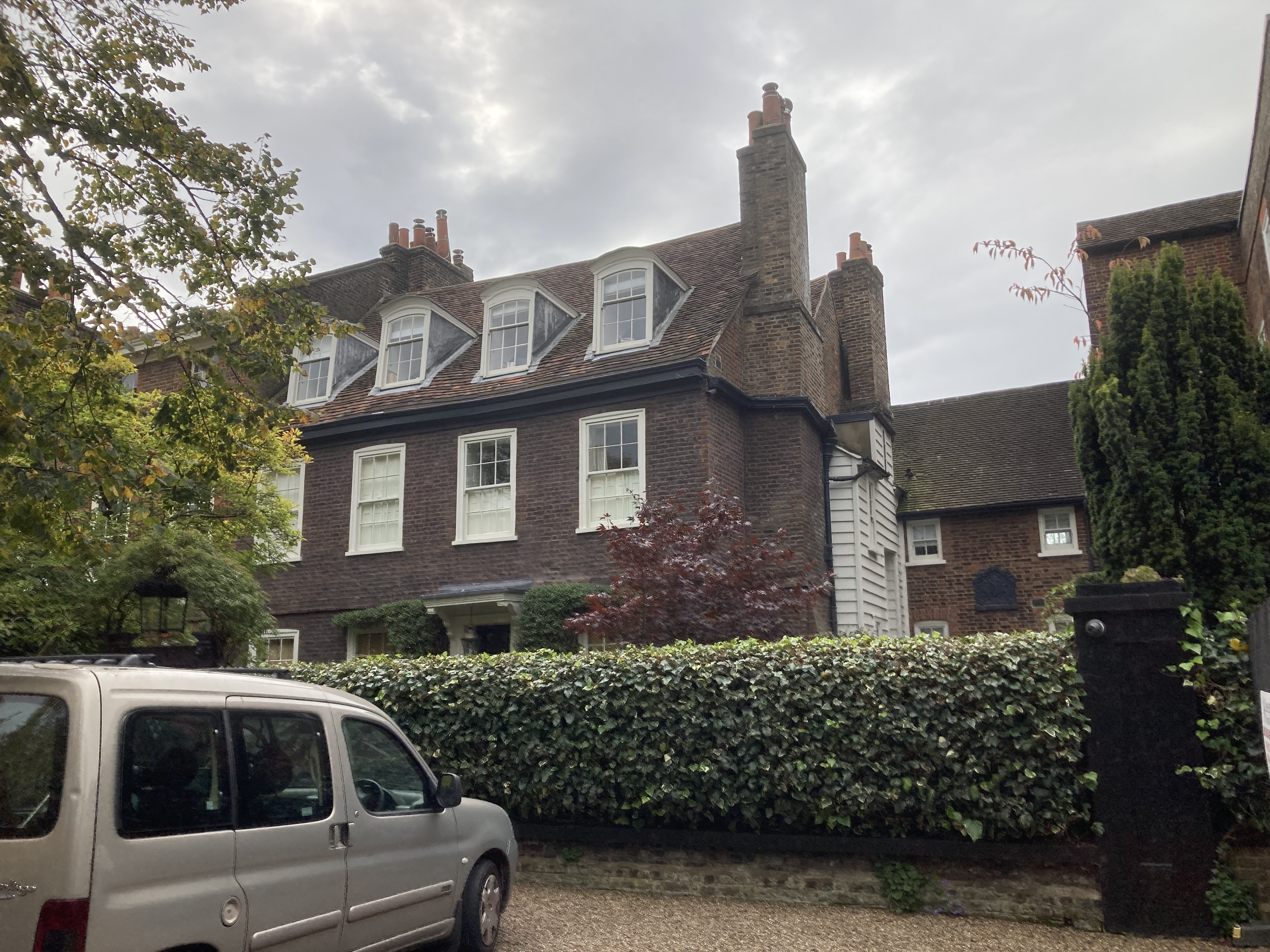
4 The Grove

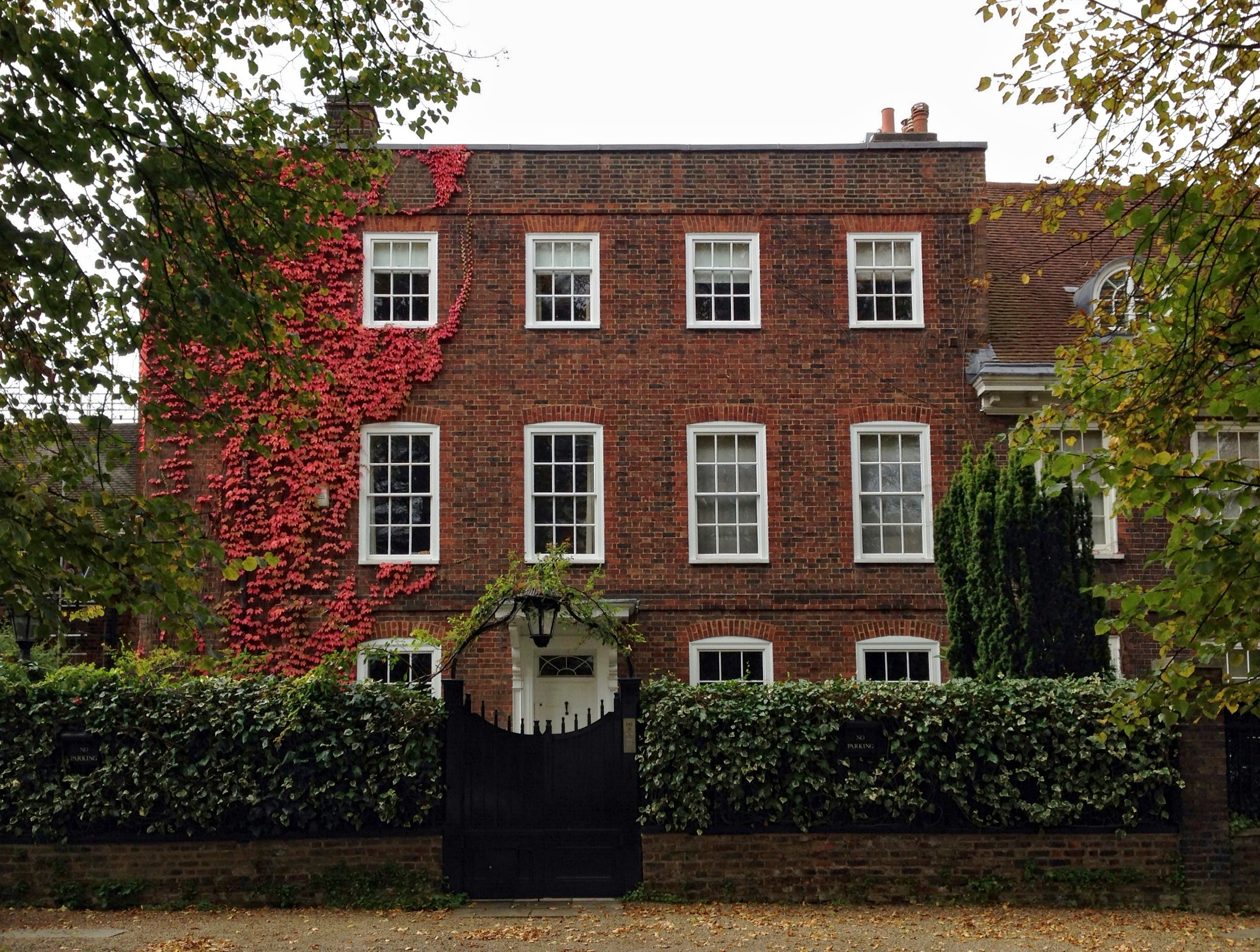
5 The Grove

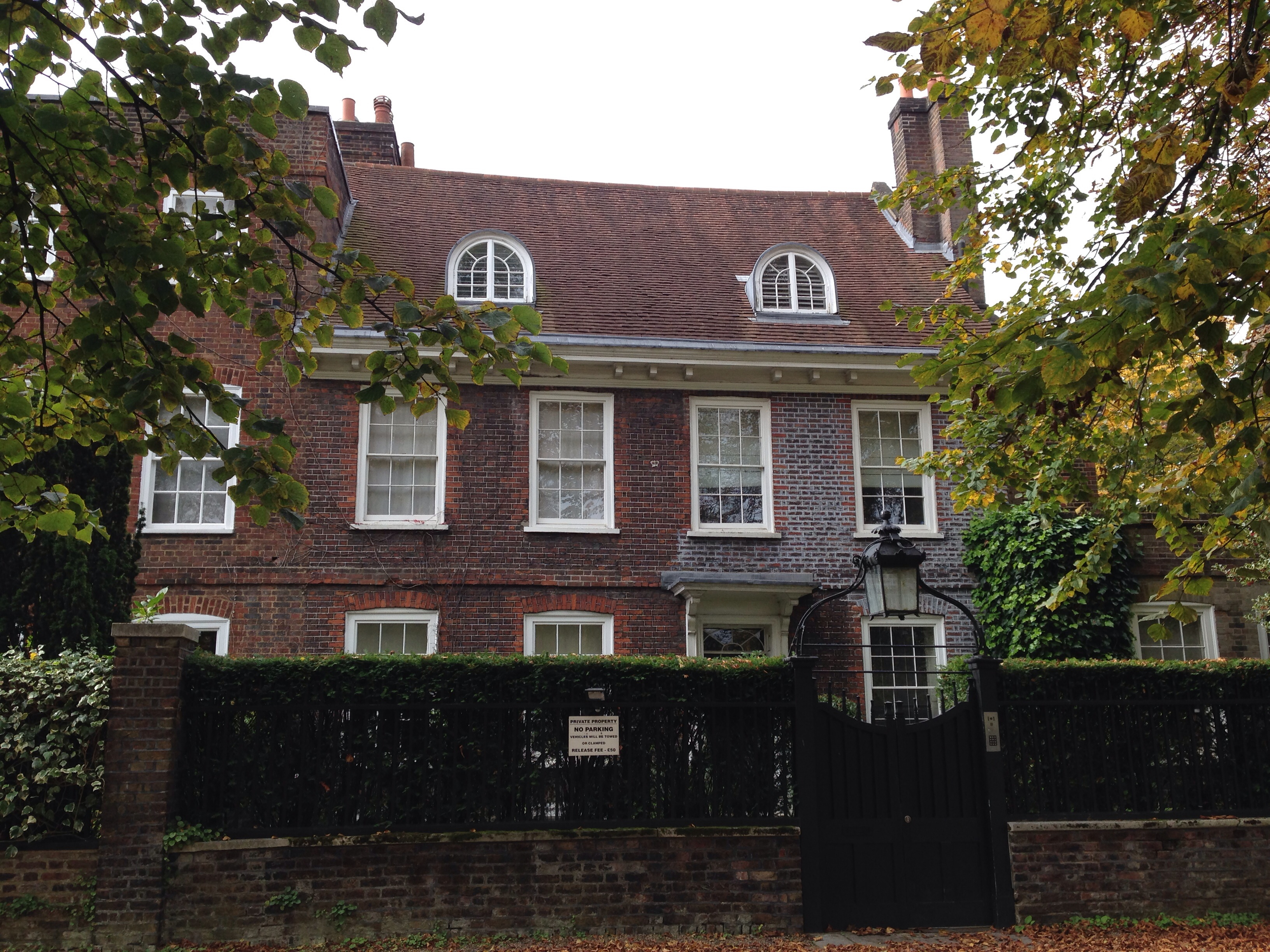
6 The Grove

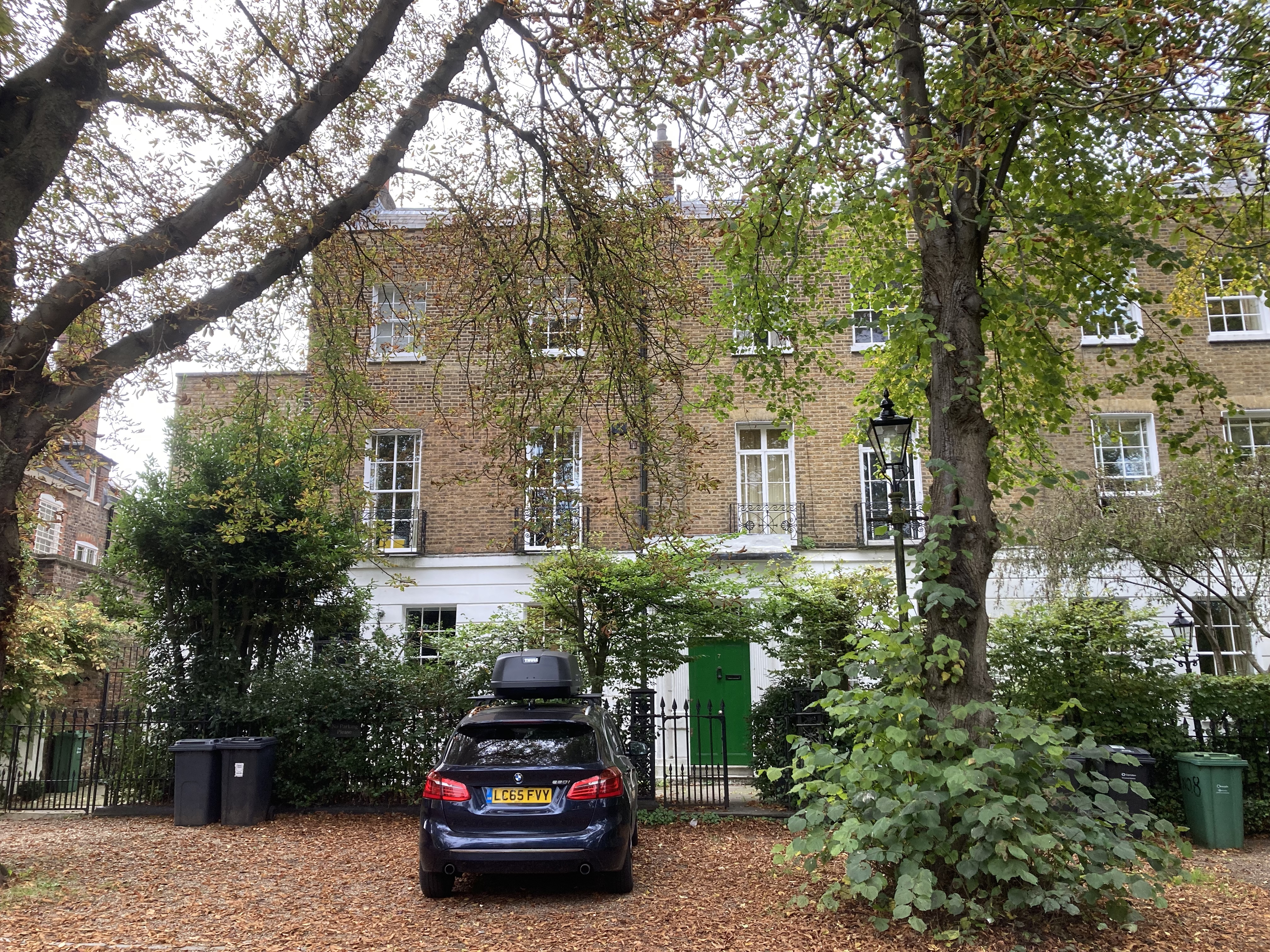
7 The Grove

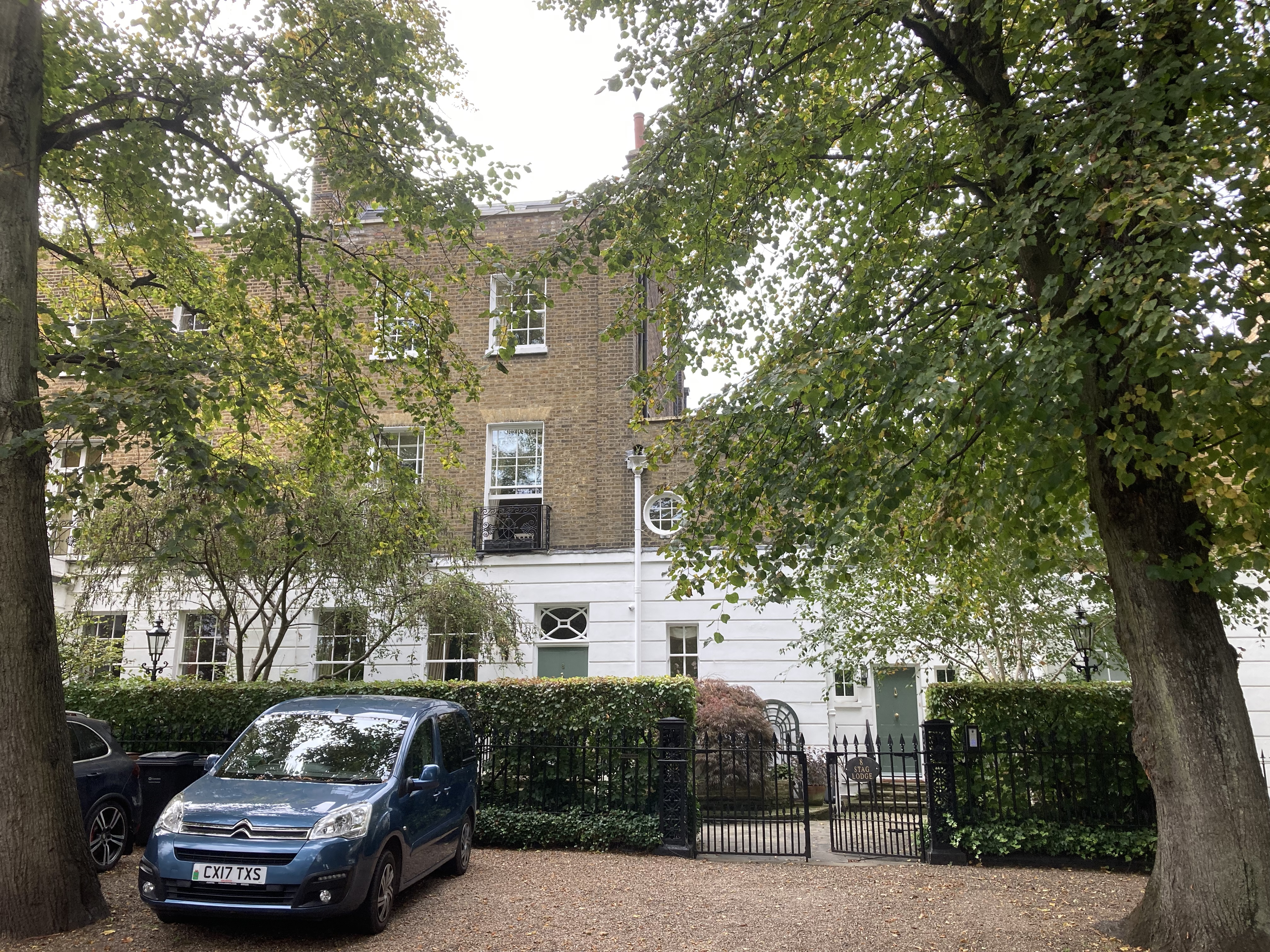
8 The Grove

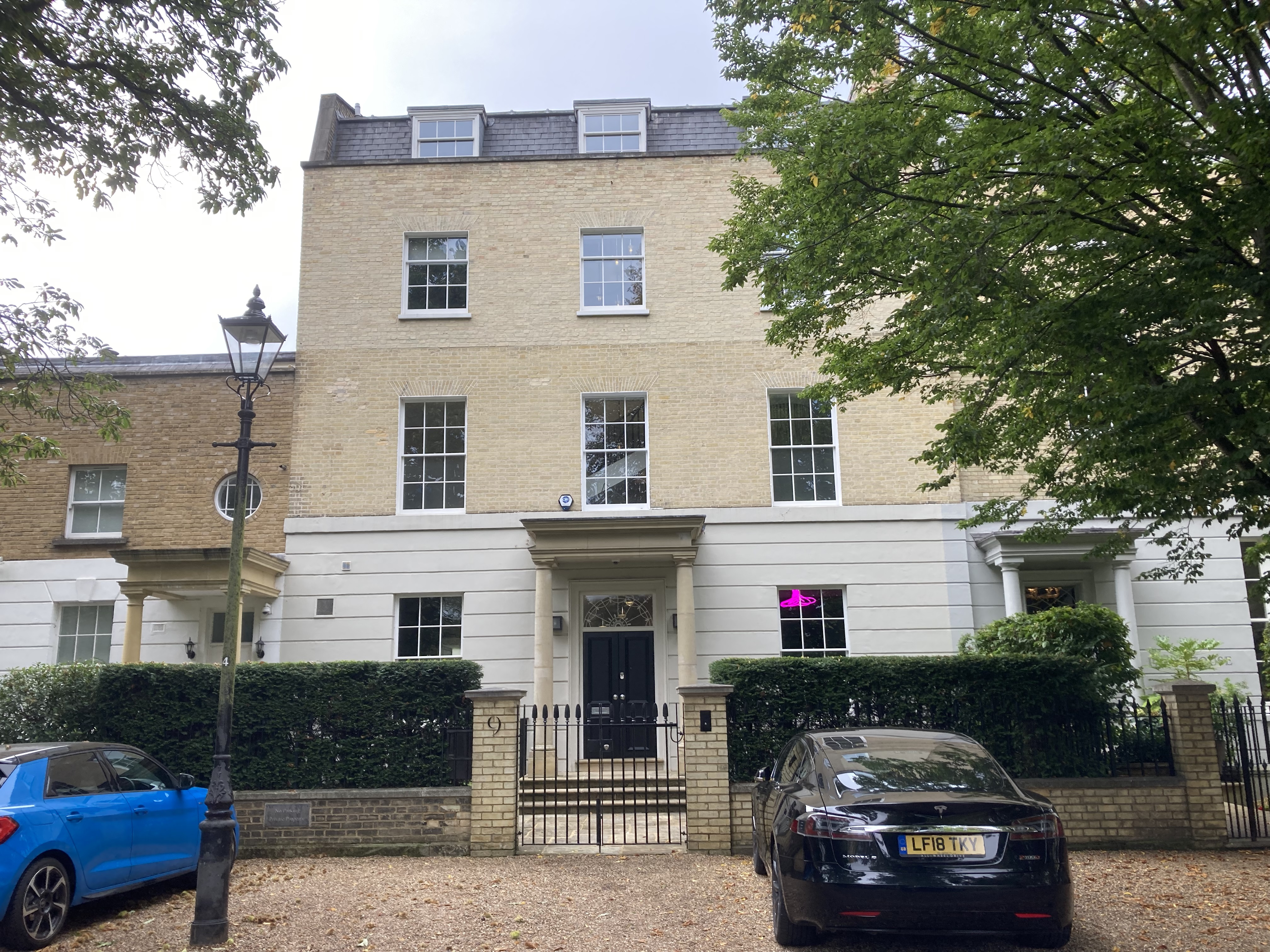
9 The Grove

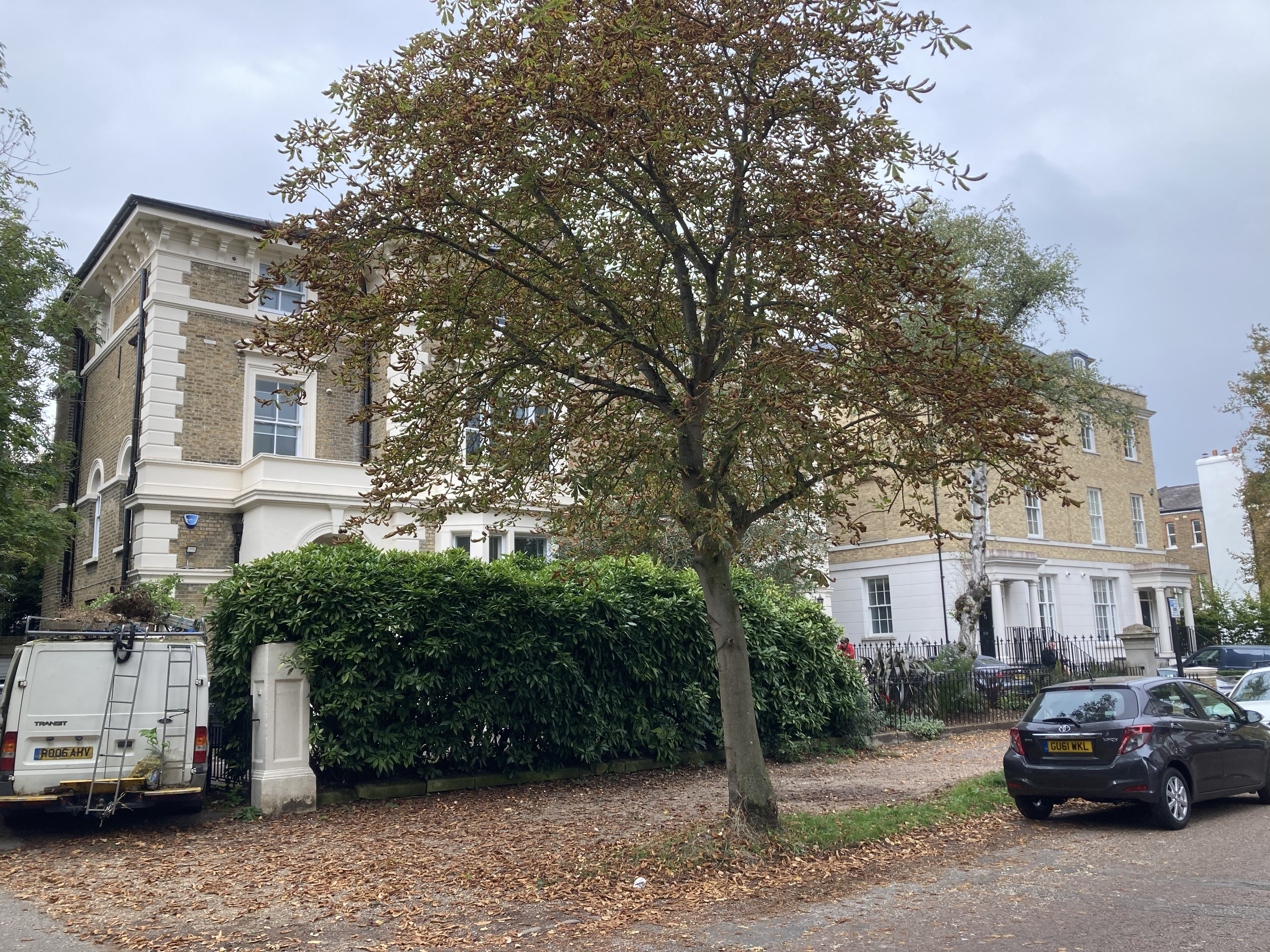
10–13 The Grove

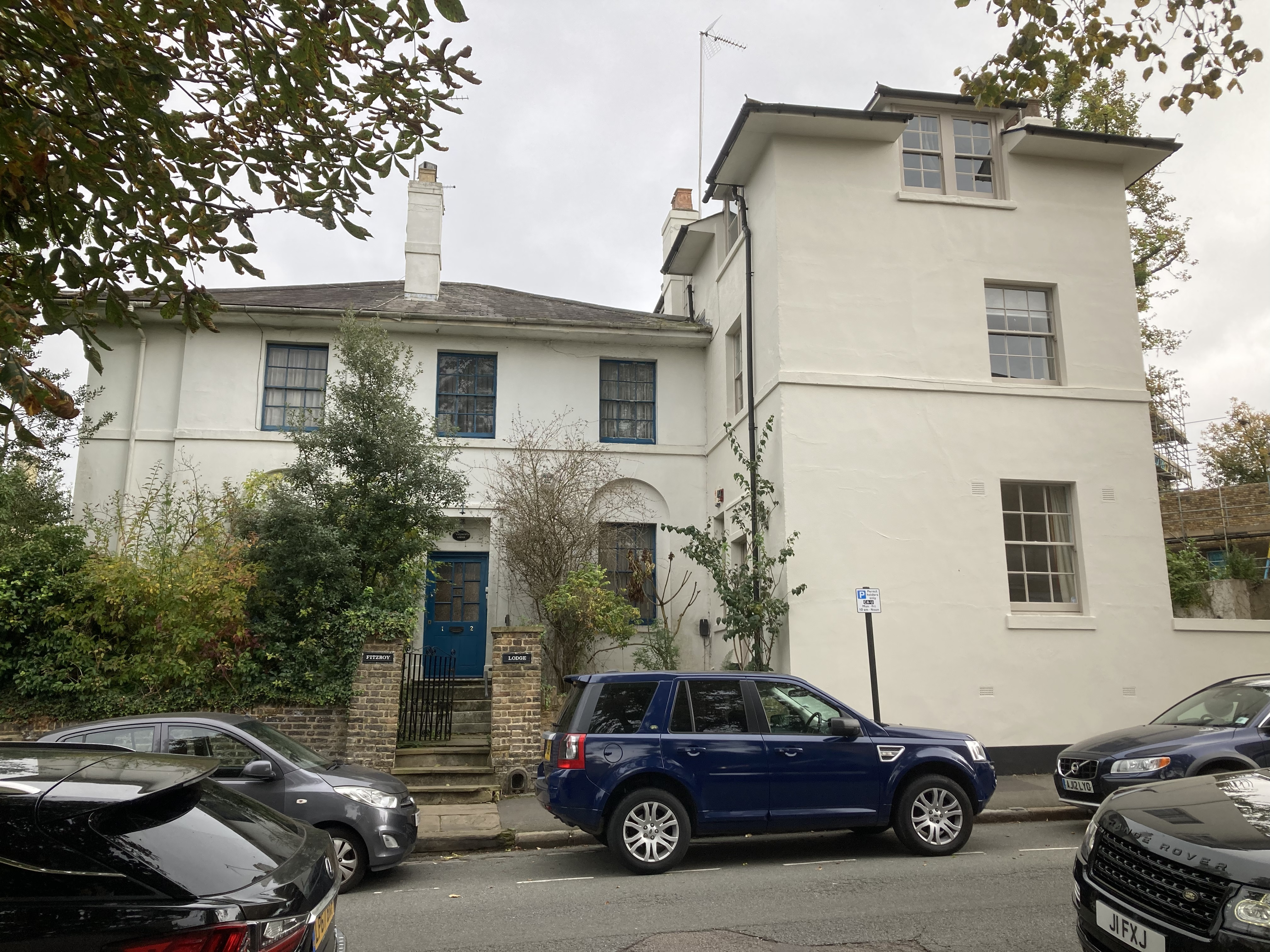
Fitzroy Lodge, The Grove

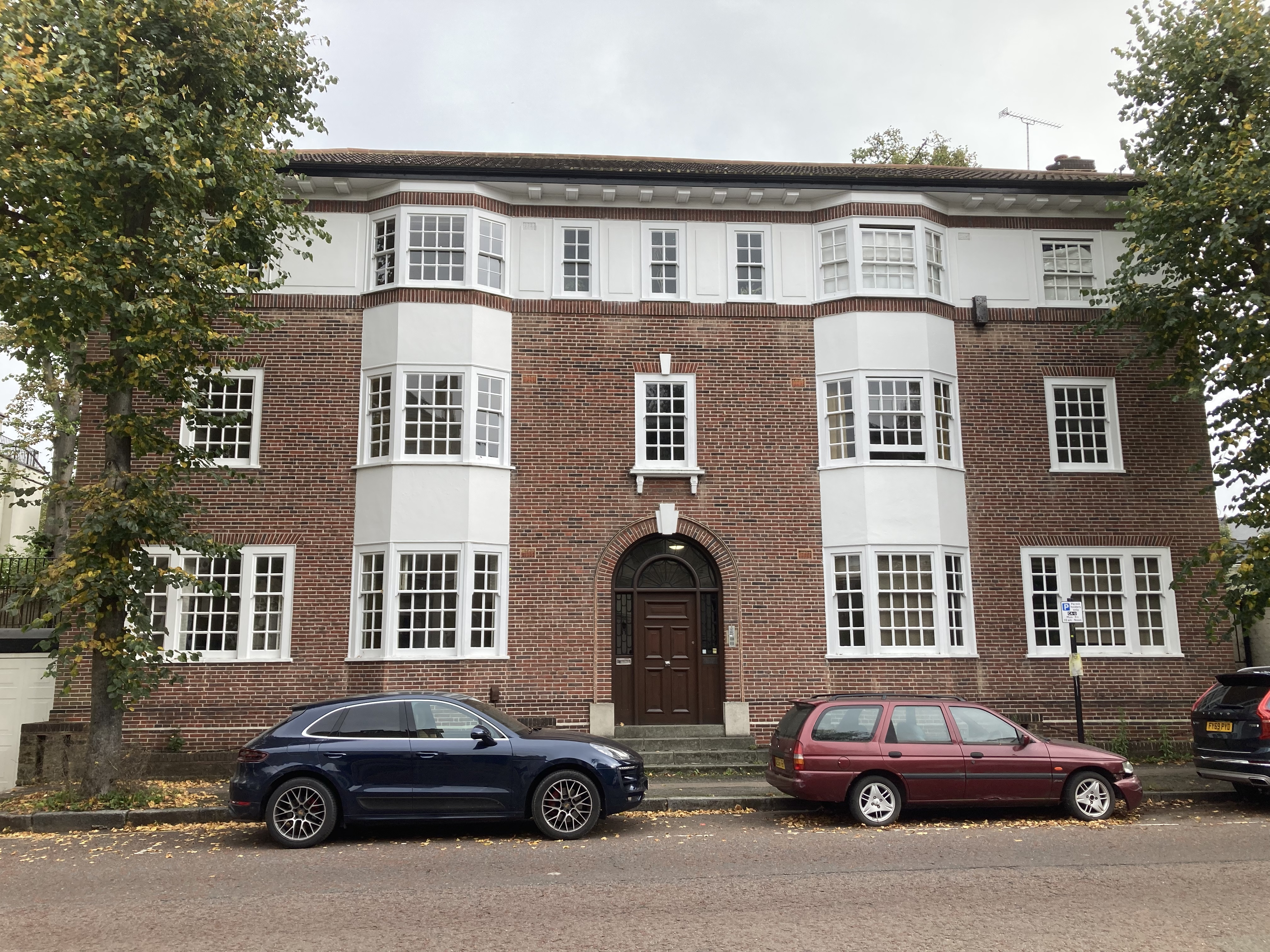
Old Well House, The Grove

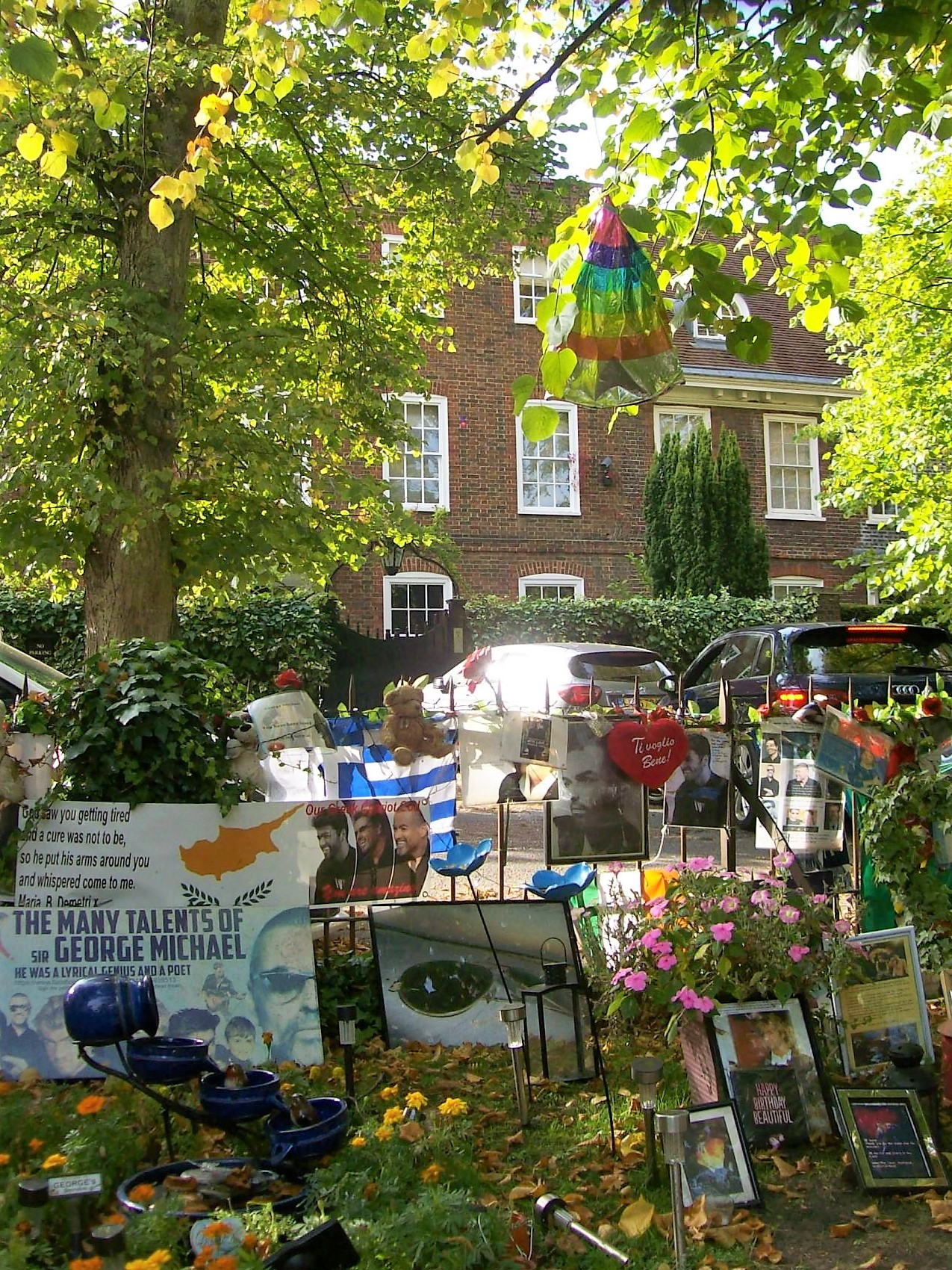
Part of the former village green which became a temporary memorial garden after the death of George Michael
