= Hoar Oak Water =

River in Somerset, England

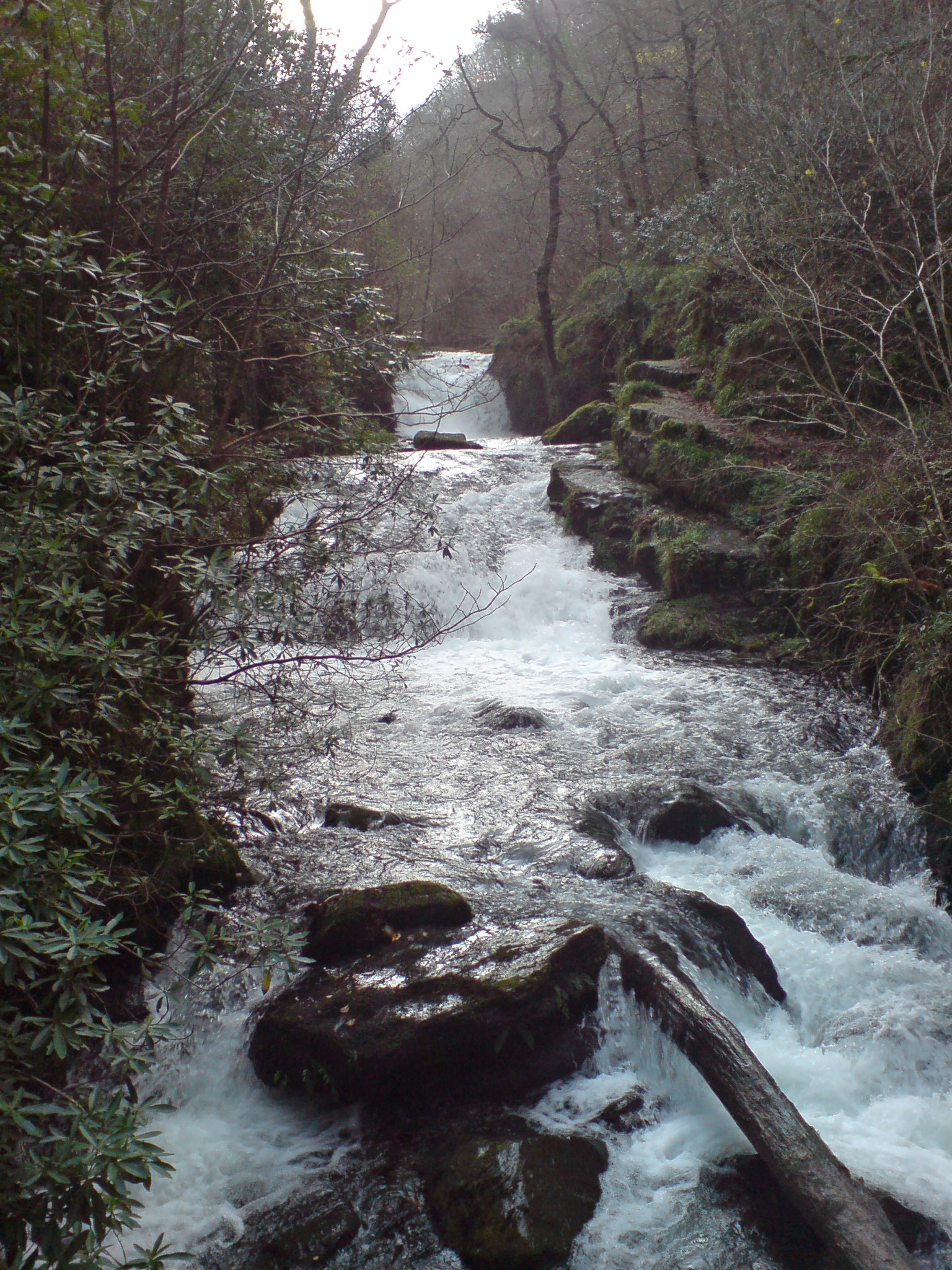
- The Hoar Oak waterfalls running into Watersmeet

Location
- Country: England
- County: Somerset, Devon
- Region: Exmoor

Physical characteristics
- Source: Hoarok Hill
  - location: Somerset, England
  - coordinates: 51°10′06″N 3°48′11″W
  - elevation: 475 ft (145 m)
- Mouth: East Lyn River
  - location: Watersmeet, Devon, England
  - coordinates: 51°13′24″N 3°47′59″W

Hoar Oak Water is a moorland tributary of the East Lyn River in Exmoor, Somerset, England.

It rises at Hoaroak Hill in the Chains geological site and flows to Watersmeet in the East Lyn Valley in Devon.
