= Wind Hill =

Hill in Devon, England

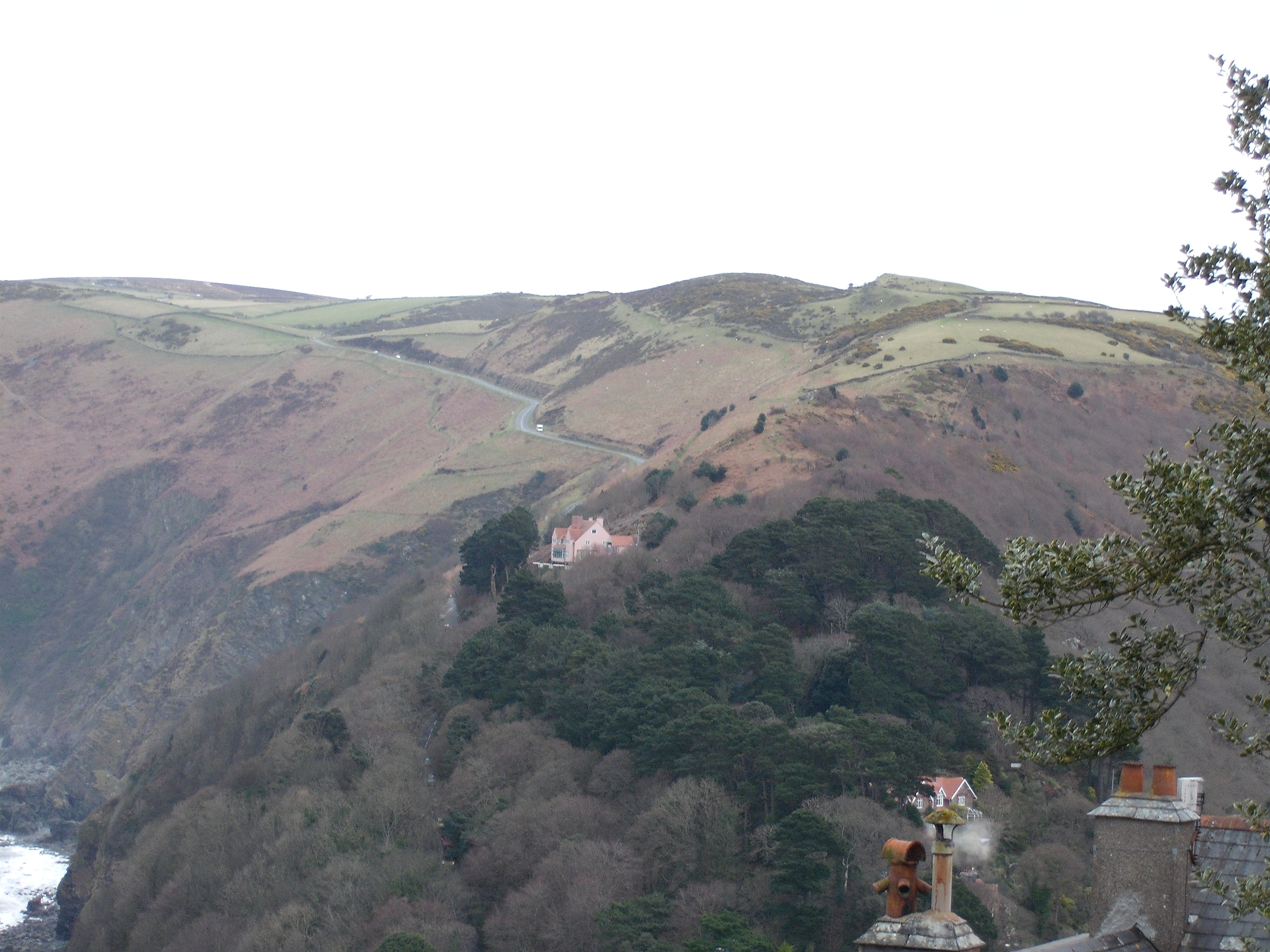
- Wind Hill seen from Lynton

Highest point
- Elevation: 261 m (856 ft)
- Coordinates: 51.2290°N 3.8065°W

Geography
- Location: Lynmouth, Devon, England

Wind Hill, situated close to Lynmouth in Devon, England, is the location of an Iron Age enclosure or "spur" hill fort. The site is effectively a hillside forming a spur or promontory between the steep valley of the East Lyn River to the south and the cliffs to the north. Wind Hill's summit is at 261 metres (856 ft) above sea level, though the enormous earthworks defending the spur are at a lower level to the east.
