= West Lyn River =

River in Somerset and Devon, England

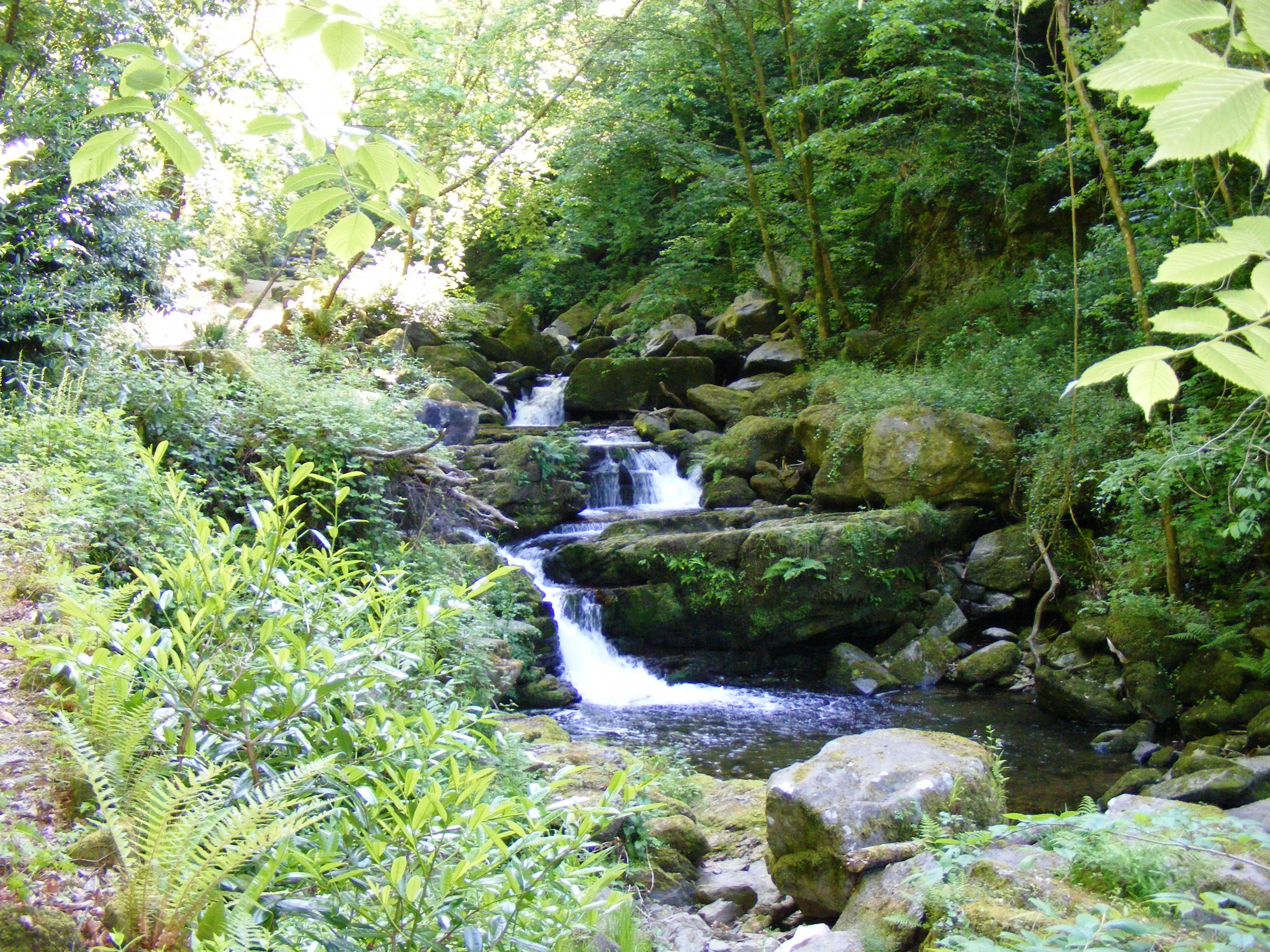
- Glen Lyn Gorge

Location
- Country: England
- County: Somerset

Physical characteristics
- Source
  - location: The Chains, Somerset, England
  - coordinates: 51°10′36″N 3°38′40″W
  - elevation: 400 m (1,300 ft)
- Mouth: Lynmouth
  - location: Devon, England
  - coordinates: 51°13′46″N 3°49′44″W
  - elevation: 0 m (0 ft)

Basin features
- Tributaries
  - left: River West Lyn

The West Lyn is a river in England which rises high in Exmoor, Somerset, and joins the East Lyn at Lynmouth in Devon.

The upper reaches have been designated as a Site of Special Scientific Interest, because of the geomorphological landforms created in the 1952 flood.

The lower reaches of the river towards Lynmouth, known as the Glen Lyn Gorge, is a tourist attraction including a museum about the local water cycle, the floods of 1952, and a small hydroelectric plant.

Water is piped from the river to power the Lynton and Lynmouth Cliff Railway, a water-balance funicular railway.
