= 5 The Grove =

House in Highgate, London

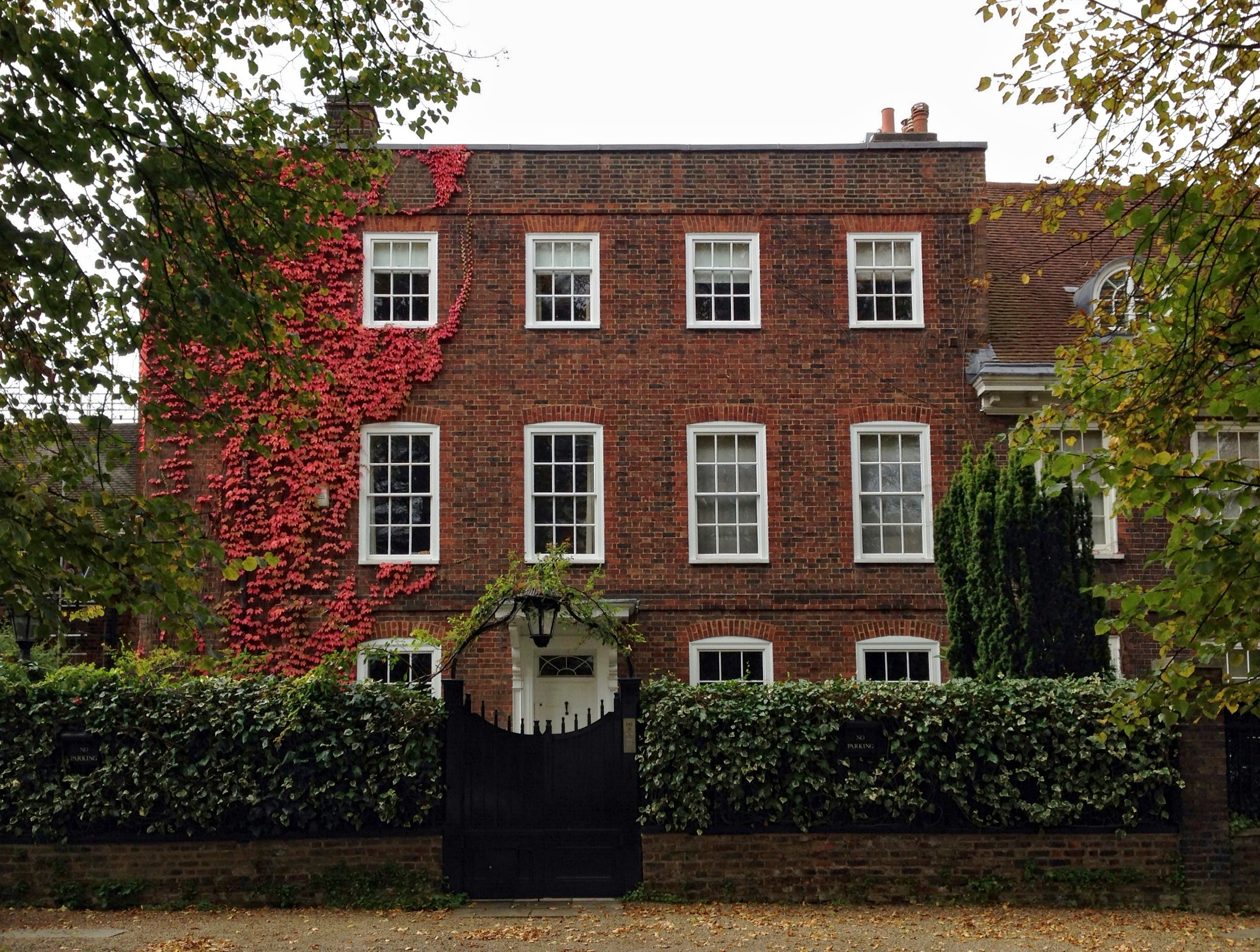
- The house in 2016

- Location within Greater London

General information
- Location: Highgate, London, England
- Coordinates: 51°34′12″N 0°09′07″W
- Year built: c. 1688
- Renovated: 1933 (rebuilt)

Renovating team
- Architect: C. H. James

Listed Building – Grade II
- Official name: Number 5 and attached railings, wall and lamp
- Designated: 10 June 1954
- Reference no.: 1378980

5 The Grove is a semi-detached house in Highgate, London. Like most properties in The Grove, it is listed as Grade II on the National Heritage List for England.

Originally built around 1688, it was rebuilt around 1933 by C. H. James, while retaining its general appearance. The house has three storeys and a basement and is built in red brick. Its interior has been substantially altered since its original construction. During James's remodelling in the 1930s, several examples of early 18th-century wallpapers were found behind wooden panelling and were subsequently donated to the Victoria and Albert Museum. Wooden railings enclose the front of the house, and a lantern surmounts the entrance. Prior to his death in 2016, George Michael was the sole tenant.

In 2020, the house was bought for £19 million by Stephen Cameron and his wife, Clare Harrison, who had made £170 million from selling the medical PR firm Nucleus Global.
