= Watersmeet House =

House in Countisbury, Devon, UK

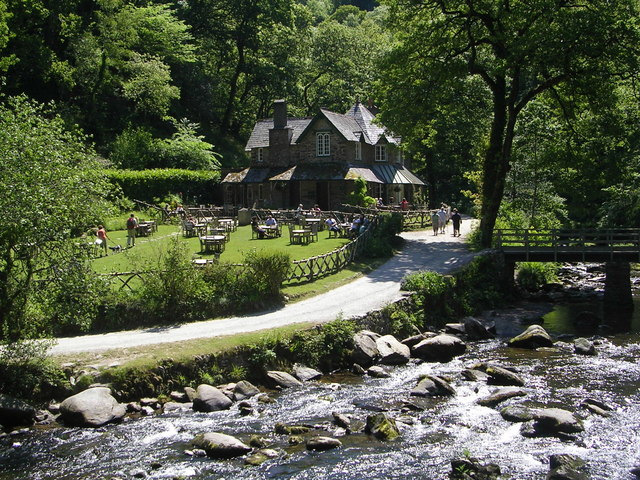
- Watersmeet House

- Location in Devon

General information
- Location: Devon, England, UK
- Coordinates: 51.2232°N 3.7994°W
- OS grid: SS743487

Watersmeet House is a National Trust property located some 1.8 miles (2.9 km) east of Lynmouth, in the English county of Devon. A former fishing lodge, it is today used as an information centre, tea room and shop by the National Trust. Adjoining the house is the Watersmeet SSSI, a Site of Special Scientific Interest.

The house, which dates from approximately 1832, was built for Walter Stevenson Halliday. It stands at the bottom of a deep gorge at the confluence of the East Lyn River and Hoar Oak Water. The house itself lies on the east bank of the river in the civil parish of Brendon and Countisbury, although the other bank is in Lynton and Lynmouth parish. Approximately 200 metres (660 ft) from the house on the bank of the river are a pair of lime kilns dating from the late 18th or early 19th century. Watersmeet House is the starting-off point for some 40 miles (64 km) of woodland, streamside and seaside walks. The site has been a tea garden since 1901, and has been owned by the National Trust since 1936.

The 348 hectares (860 acres) Watersmeet SSSI, partly situated on land also owned by the National Trust, includes an extensive area of ancient oak woodland. The woodland is notable for its endemic species of tree, the Watersmeet Whitebeam (Karpatiosorbus admonitor).
