= Brendon and Countisbury =

Civil parish in Devon, England

Coordinates: 51.22°N 3.76°W

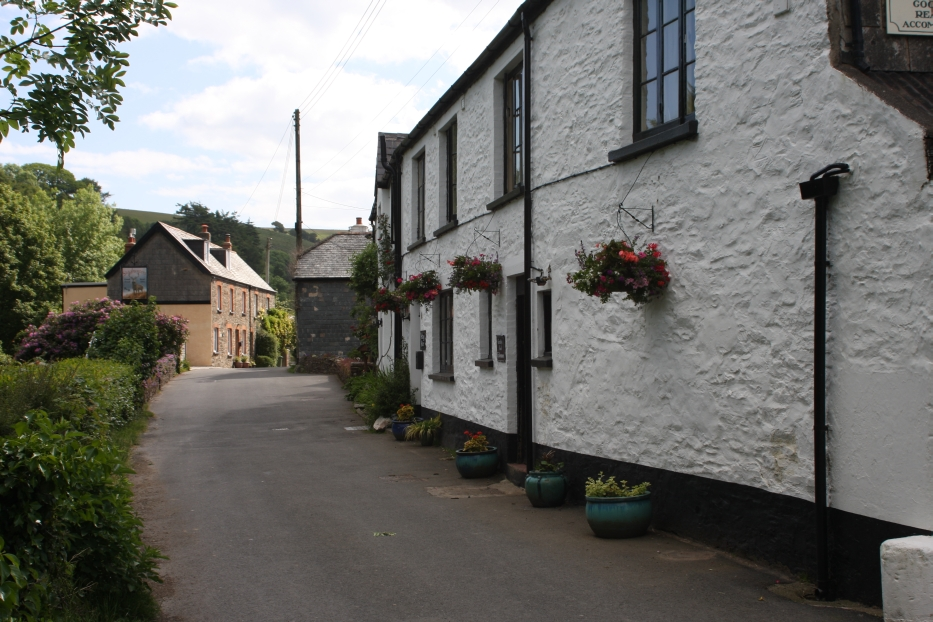

- Location within Devon
- Civil parish: Brendon and Countisbury
- District: North Devon
- Shire county: Devon
- Region: South West
- Country: England
- Sovereign state: United Kingdom
- Post town: Lynton
- Postcode district: EX35
- Police: Devon and Cornwall
- Fire: Devon and Somerset
- Ambulance: South Western

Brendon and Countisbury is an English civil parish in the district of North Devon and the county of Devon.

The civil parish was created on 1 April 2013, by the merger of the previous civil parishes of Brendon and Countisbury.
