= East Lyn River =

River in Somerset and Devon, England

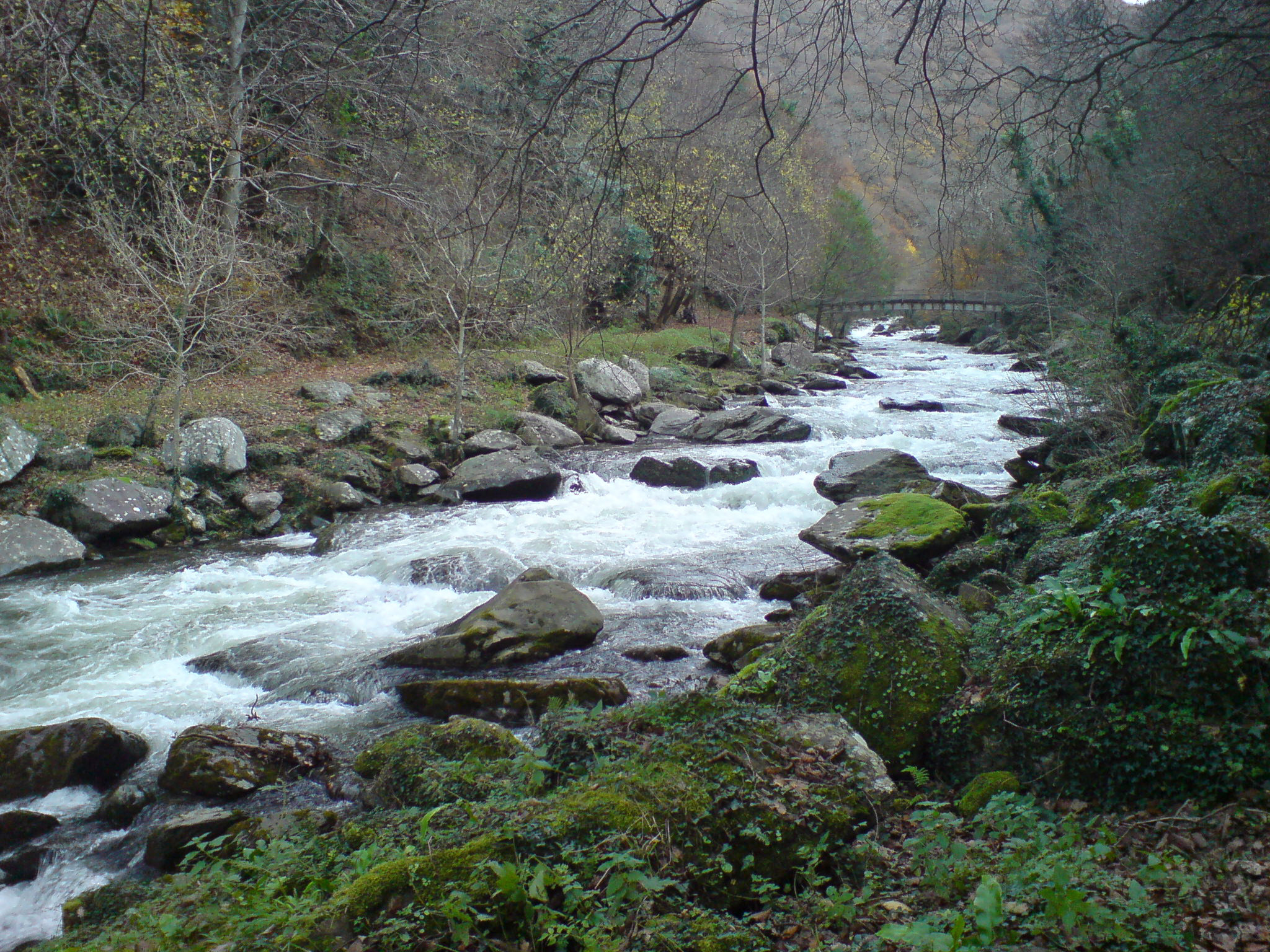

Location
- Country: England
- County: Devon

Physical characteristics
- Source: East Lyn (Upper)
  - location: Malmsmead
  - coordinates: 51°13′05″N 3°43′43″W
  - elevation: 230 m (750 ft)
- Source confluence
  - location: Watersmeet House
  - coordinates: 51°13′19″N 3°47′55″W
  - elevation: 150 m (490 ft)
- Mouth: Lynmouth
  - location: Devon, England
  - coordinates: 51°13′53″N 3°49′48″W
  - elevation: 0 m (0 ft)

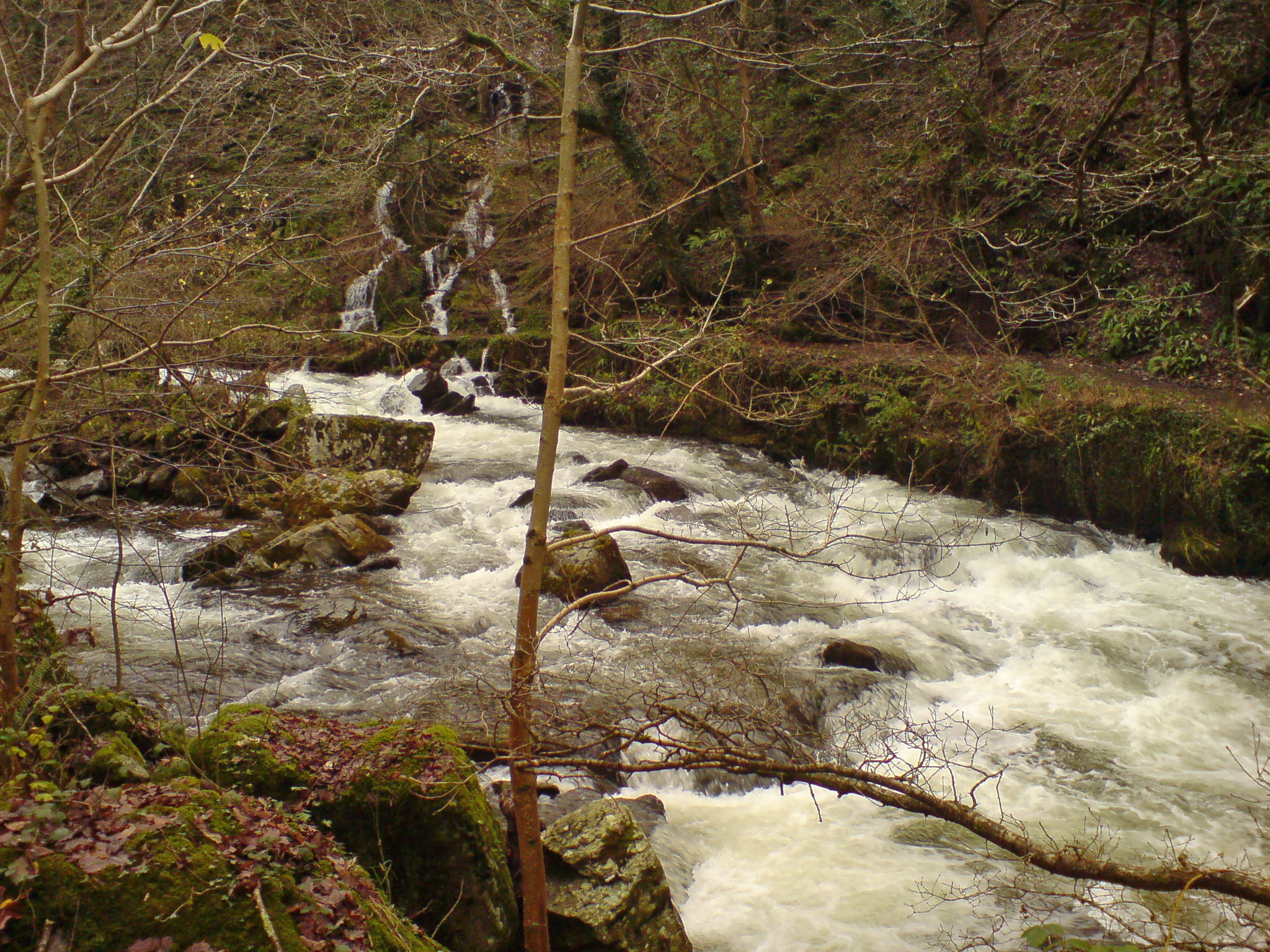
The gorge section

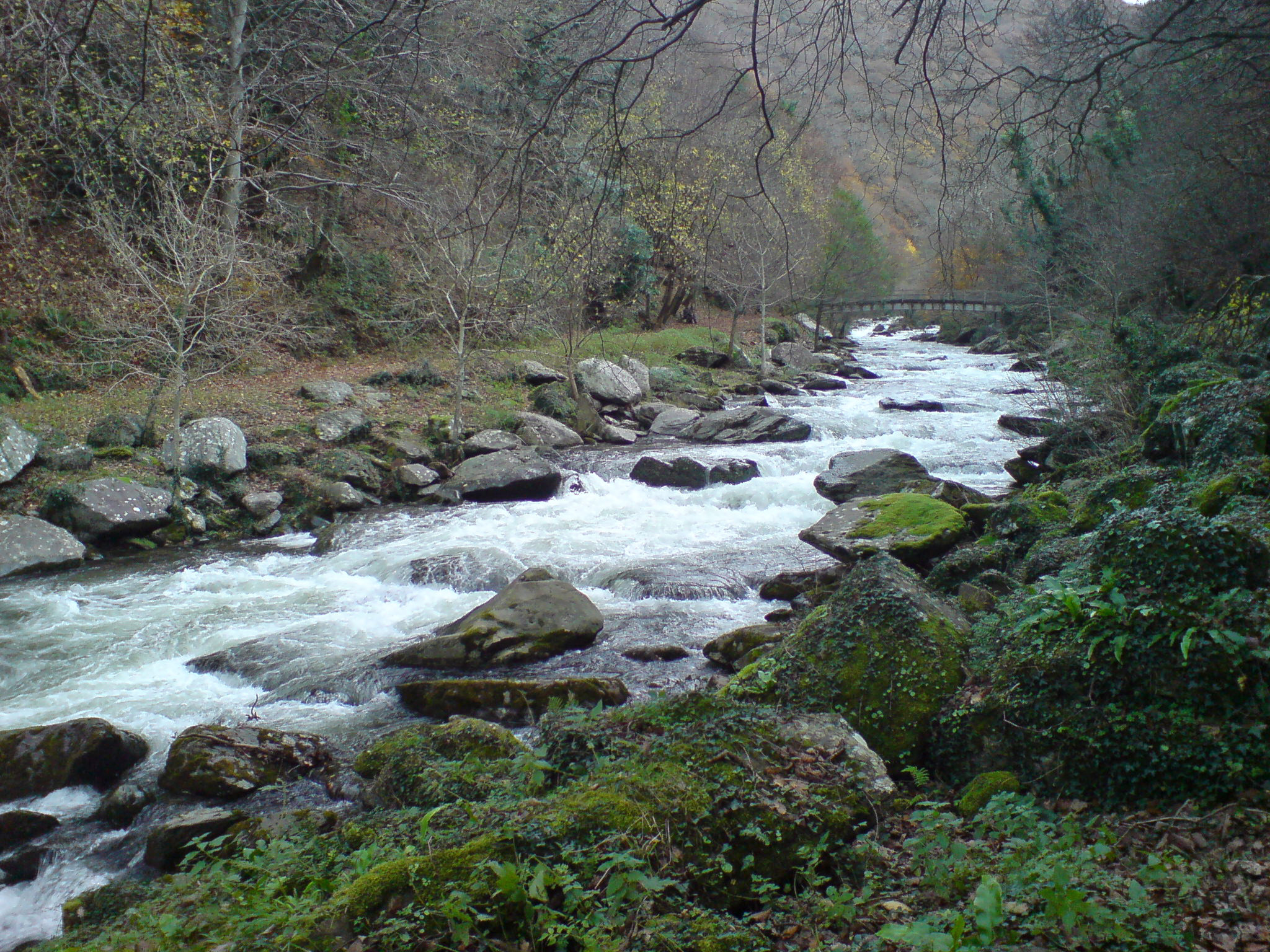
Grade 3 rapids after the gorge

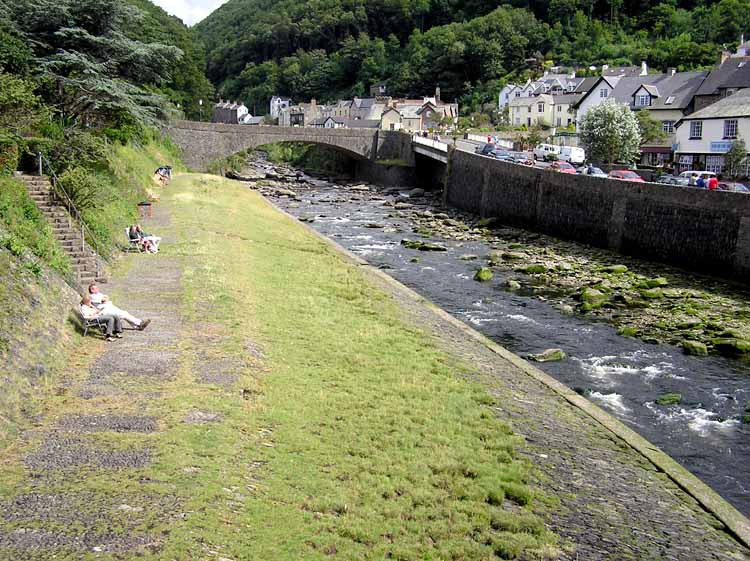
East Lyn at Lynmouth

The East Lyn is a river which rises high in Exmoor, in the English county of Somerset. It flows through the East Lyn Valley in Devon.

== Watercourse ==
The river is formed as the Upper East Lyn at Malmsmead from two minor tributaries, the Oare Water and Badgworthy Water. It flows for several miles, past Brendon and makes confluence with Hoar Oak Water at Watersmeet, where Watersmeet House is situated. The river then passes through a narrow gorge section, before flowing downstream for a further 2.5 miles (4.0 km) until the river meets with the West Lyn River and flows into the Bristol Channel at Lynmouth.

== History ==
The Lynmouth Disaster occurred on the East Lyn river due to rocks and fallen trees having been washed into the West Lyn river. These formed a log jam near Watersmeet, forming a landslide dam. When the pressure behind the dam increased to uncontrollable levels, the water broke out of the dam, and rushed down the East Lyn (via the convergence of the rivers) into Lynmouth, obliterating houses and ultimately resulting in 34 deaths. Boulders from the incident can still be seen today along the banks of the East Lyn towards Lynmouth.

== Recreation ==
=== Angling ===
Angling interests especially in the summer are targeted towards the salmon which migrate up the river to spawn. There is also trout fishing.

=== Walking ===
It is popular for walkers with the Two Moors Way near to much of the river.

=== Whitewater kayaking ===
Whitewater kayakers frequently run this river in the winter when seeking a challenging Grade 4 paddle.
