= Badgworthy Water =

River in Devon and Somerset, England

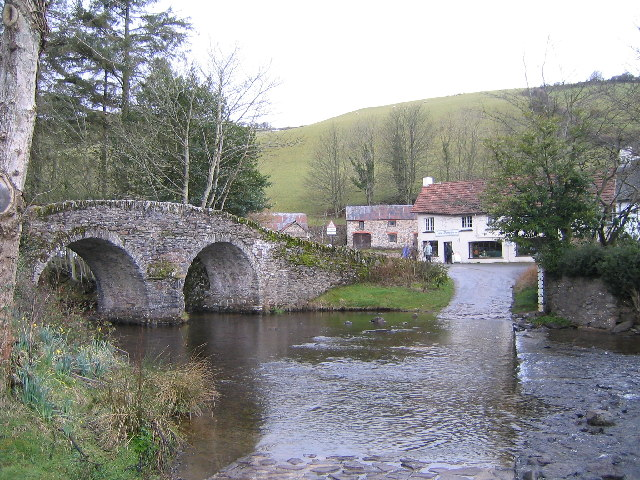
- The bridge and ford at Malmsmead

Location
- Country: England
- County: Devon

Physical characteristics
- Source
  - location: Devon, England
  - coordinates: 51°10′38″N 3°43′23″W
- Mouth: East Lyn River
  - location: Somerset, England
  - coordinates: 51°13′05″N 3°43′42″W

Basin features
- Tributaries
  - left: Hoccombe Water

Badgworthy Water is a small river which flows through Malmsmead on Exmoor, close to the border between Devon and Somerset, England.

It merges with Oare Water to become the East Lyn River.

On the banks of the river are the remains of a few dwellings which formed a medieval village. The last resident left in the 1820s.

The 17th century packhorse Malmsmead Bridge crosses Badgworthy Water, alongside an even older ford.

The valley is associated with the book Lorna Doone.

It has been used for canoeing and includes grade 2 and 3 rapids, walking and fly fishing.
