= Porlock (disambiguation) =

Porlock is a coastal village in Somerset, England.

Porlock may also refer to:

- A character in The Valley of Fear, a Sherlock Holmes novel by Sir Arthur Conan Doyle

== See also ==
- Person on business from Porlock, a man who interrupted Samuel Taylor Coleridge in 1797
