= Joan D'Arcy Cooper =

American psychologist

Joan D'Arcy Cooper (1927–1982) was a psychologist, Yoga teacher, and author known primarily for her book Guided Meditation and the Teachings of Jesus, which proposed that the words of Jesus were intended not to be taken literally but as the focus of meditations, in a manner comparable to the practice of affective piety.

== Biography ==
Joan D"Arcy (Jeancon) Cooper was born in California, where she graduated from Pomona College with an undergraduate degree in International Law and subsequently earned a Doctorate in Psychology in Berlin, before moving to Culbone where she practised and taught Yoga and meditation for West Somerset Community Education, whilst working as a freelance psychologist, and a licensed Lay Reader in the diocese of Bath and Wells.

=== Death ===
After Cooper's death, the Rainbow Programme of Ascended Master Teachings led by Colin James Hamer appointed her to the position of an Ascended Master, which according to the principles of theosophy is a spiritually enlightened being. Although the position of Ascended Master may have been an appointment bestowed upon her rather than one she considered appropriate, Cooper nonetheless purportedly espoused ideas commensurate with theosophical thought.

Cooper was married to the potter Waistel Cooper and is buried in the churchyard of Culbone Church.

== Selected writings ==
- Culbone: A Spiritual History, Taunton: Georjan Studio. 1st Edition. 1977.
- The Door Within: Some Meditations on Illness, Pain, Ageing and Death, Regency Press 1979.
- The Ancient Teaching of Yoga and the Spiritual Evolution of Man, London: Research Publishing Company. First Edition. 24 May 1979.
- Corner-Stones of the Spiritual World, Culbone: Joan Cooper, 1981.
- Guided Meditation and the Teaching of Jesus, Salisbury: Element Books. (Reissue Edition) 30 November 1982.

== See also ==
- Affective meditation
