= Porlock Weir =

Harbour settlement in Somerset, England

Coordinates: 51.219°N 3.629°W

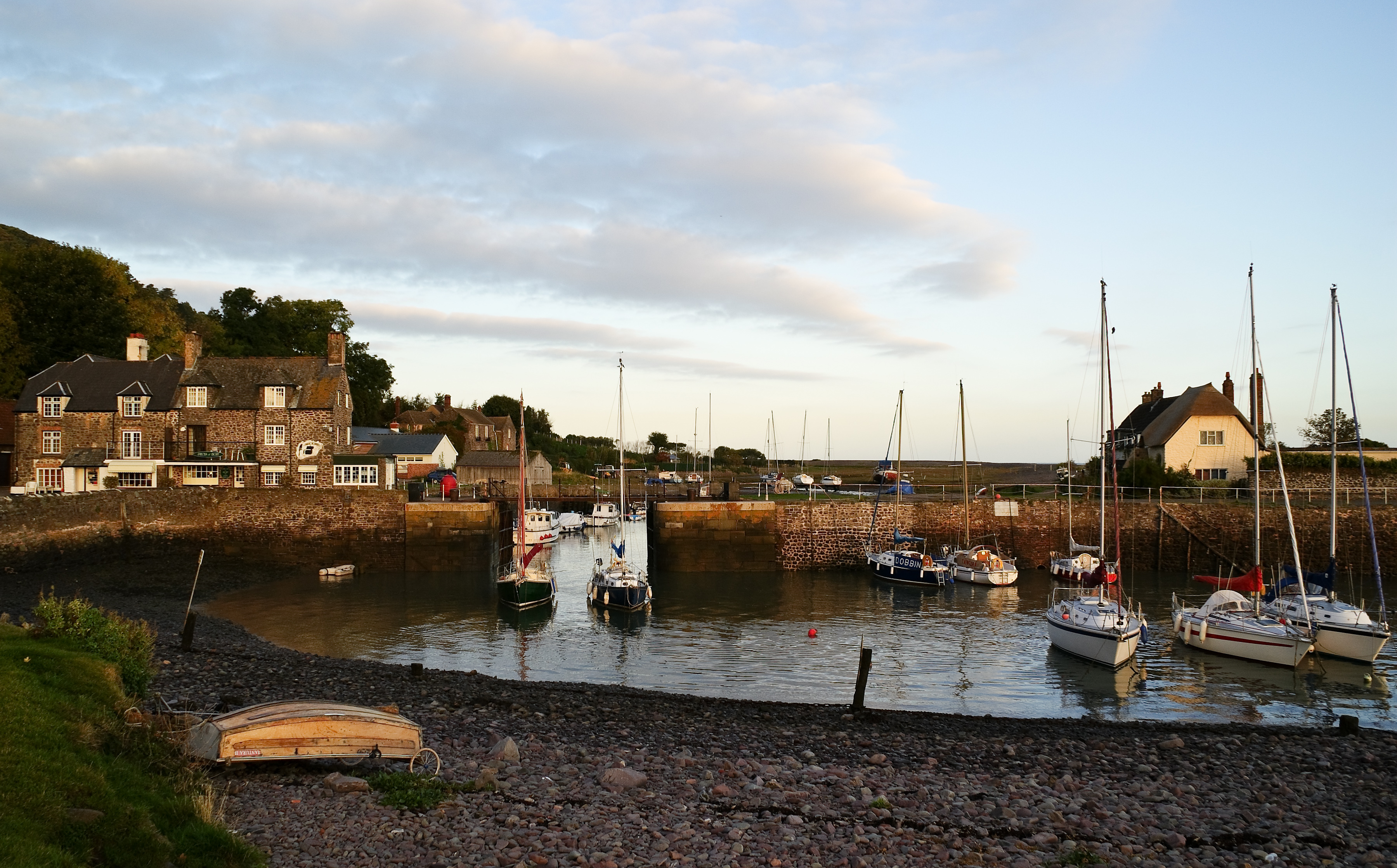
- Porlock Weir harbour in early light

- Location within Somerset
- OS grid reference: SS863479
- Civil parish: Porlock
- Unitary authority: Somerset Council
- Ceremonial county: Somerset
- Region: South West
- Country: England
- Sovereign state: United Kingdom
- Post town: MINEHEAD
- Postcode district: TA24
- Dialling code: 01643
- Police: Avon and Somerset
- Fire: Devon and Somerset
- Ambulance: South Western
- UK Parliament: Tiverton and Minehead

Porlock Weir is a harbour settlement approximately 1.5 miles (2.4 km) west of the inland village of Porlock in Somerset, England. "Porlock" comes from the Old English port loca, meaning an enclosure near a harbour. Porlock Weir refers to the salmon stakes and traps that were situated along the shore. Like most ports in West Somerset, the harbour is tidal, is home to a small flotilla of yachts, and is visited by many more in spring and summer.

The port has existed for more than a thousand years. The Anglo-Saxon Chronicle reports that in 1052 Harold Godwinson came from Ireland with nine ships and plundered the area, and before that it was raided by Danes in 866 AD. In the 18th and 19th centuries coal from South Wales was the main cargo and in World War II pit props cut in local forests were the return cargo.

The ketch Lizzy, built in Appledore, was spotted in trouble off Lynmouth in a storm in 1854. The ship had lost her masts, and was in very bad condition. A fishing boat was sent out to rescue the crew, as Lynmouth had no lifeboat. The boat reached the stricken ketch, rescued the crew and returned to Lynmouth safely. The weather improved, and a fresh crew, with the vessel's skipper attempted to salvage her. They improvised with a scrap of sail, and managed to get safely around Foreland Point. They sailed on all night, only just managing to keep the ship afloat. When they reached Gore Point, a mile from Porlock Weir, the ketch sank in shallow water, and still lies submerged off the point.

On 12 January 1899, in a storm, the ten-ton Lynmouth lifeboat was launched, but because of the ferocity of the storm could not put out to sea, and was hauled by men and 20 horses over Countisbury and Porlock Hills to Porlock Weir where the water was less rough. Thirteen seamen were rescued.

Many cottages date from the 17th century, including the row of five Gibraltar Cottages which has been designated as a Grade II listed building.

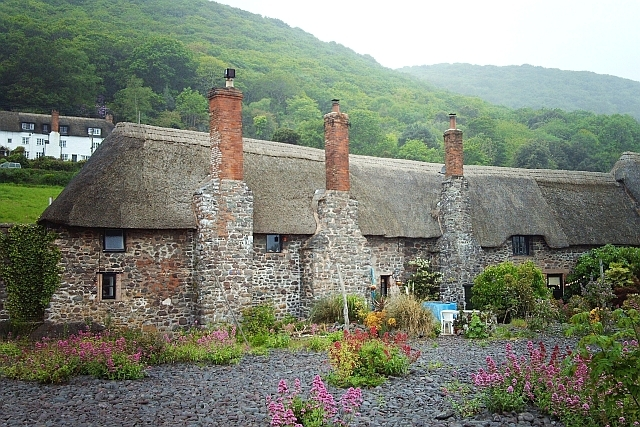
Gibraltar Cottages

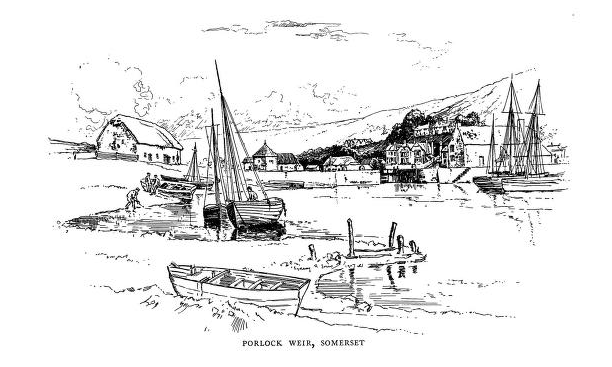
Porlock Weir harbour, as illustrated by Sydney R. Jones in 1908

The South West Coast Path and other trails link to Porlock Ridge and Saltmarsh and the hamlet of Culbone, where St Beuno's Church is said to be the smallest parish church in England.
