= Joan Cooper (disambiguation) =

Joan Cooper (1922–1989) was a British actress.

Joan Cooper also may refer to:

- J. California Cooper, the pen-name of Joan Cooper (1931–2014), American playwright and author
- Joan Cooper (social worker) (1914–1999), English civil servant and social worker
- Joan D'Arcy Cooper (1927–1982), psychologist, Yoga teacher, and author
