= Thomas of Hales =

English Franciscan friar and ecclesiastical

Thomas of Hales, also known as Thomas de Hales, was a thirteenth-century English Franciscan friar and ecclesiastical known for his intellectually progressive prose and poetry in Latin, French, and English. He was among the few Franciscan lyricists of his time, contributing significantly to the literary culture of mid-thirteenth-century England. His works reflect the movement towards affective piety, vernacular literacy, and textual scholarship influenced by university methods.

His English poem Love Rune is frequently anthologized. Thomas of Hales is believed to have originated from Hailes, Gloucestershire. Among his surviving works, the most popular is the Latintext "De vita seu genealogia Beatae Virginis Mariae," a life of the Virgin Mary. This work, which survives in a thirteenth-century copy once in the library of the abbey of St Victor (now University of Basel Library, MS B.VIII. 1., fols. 47vb–57vb). It draws on the Gospels, Apocrypha, patristic texts, and the visions of Elizabeth of Schönau. This was his most popular work, and while it is not theologically adventurous its spirit and organization reflect ideas and methods then popular in university settings. Its approach to Mary's life falls in line with trends in affective piety.

Another notable work is the Anglo-Norman Sermon, a sermon written in French with short Latin prayers, found in Oxford, St John's College, MS 190. This Sermon is a meditation on the Life of Christ organized according to the Parable of the Talents, where each talent that the sinner renders to Christ at the Last Judgment is a particular event in Christ's own life like the Incarnation or the Ascension. Like the De Vita...Beatae Virginis Mariae, the Sermon encourages an affective response to the life and suffering of its subject.

The third work, the Love Rune or A Luve Ron—or love song, is written in English and was composed between 1234 and 1272. "The jewel-like lyric presented here is to be read in the spirit of a riddle or conundrum, one that imparts a mysterious, holy wisdom to be lived and learned by heart."

Recent evidence indicates that Thomas of Hales intervened with Queen Eleanor of Provence, wife of Henry III, on behalf of converts and religious matters, highlighting his influence and connections within the religious and royal circles of his time.

== Editions ==
- Susanne Greer Fein (ed.), Moral Love Songs and Lament, (Kalamazoo, MI: Medieval Institute Publications, 1998). Contains an edition of the Love Rune; there is also an online version at Thomas of Hales, Love Rune | Robbins Library Digital Projects). Thomas of Hales, Love Rune: Introduction | Robbins Library Digital Projects
- Raphael Holinshed, John Hooker, Francis Thynne, Abraham Fleming, John Stow, Sir Henry Ellis '1807' "Holinshed's Chronicles of England, Scotland, and Ireland ...: England"
- Sarah M. Horrall (ed.), The Lyf of Oure Lady: The ME Translation of Thomas de Hales' Vita Sancte Marie. Heidelberg: Carl Winter, 1985.
- M. Dominica Legge, "The Anglo-Norman Sermon of Thomas of Hales," Modern Language Review 30 (1935), 212-218.
- Denis Renevey, '1215–1349: texts', in Samuel Fanous and Vincent Gillespie, eds, The Cambridge Companion to Medieval English Mysticism, (Cambridge, 2011), pp99–103.
