= Lynmouth Lifeboat Station =

Station for search-and-rescue operations at Lynmouth, Devon

- Map of Devon showing Lynmouth

General information
- Type: Lifeboat station
- Location: Devon, United Kingdom
- Coordinates: 51.2309°N 3.8312°W
- Opened: 1867
- Closed: 1944

Lynmouth Lifeboat Station was the base for Royal National Lifeboat Institution (RNLI) search and rescue operations at Lynmouth, Devon in England from 1869 until 1944. Its best-known action was in 1899 when the lifeboat was taken 15 miles (24 km) across Exmoor before being launched to assist a ship in trouble.

== History ==
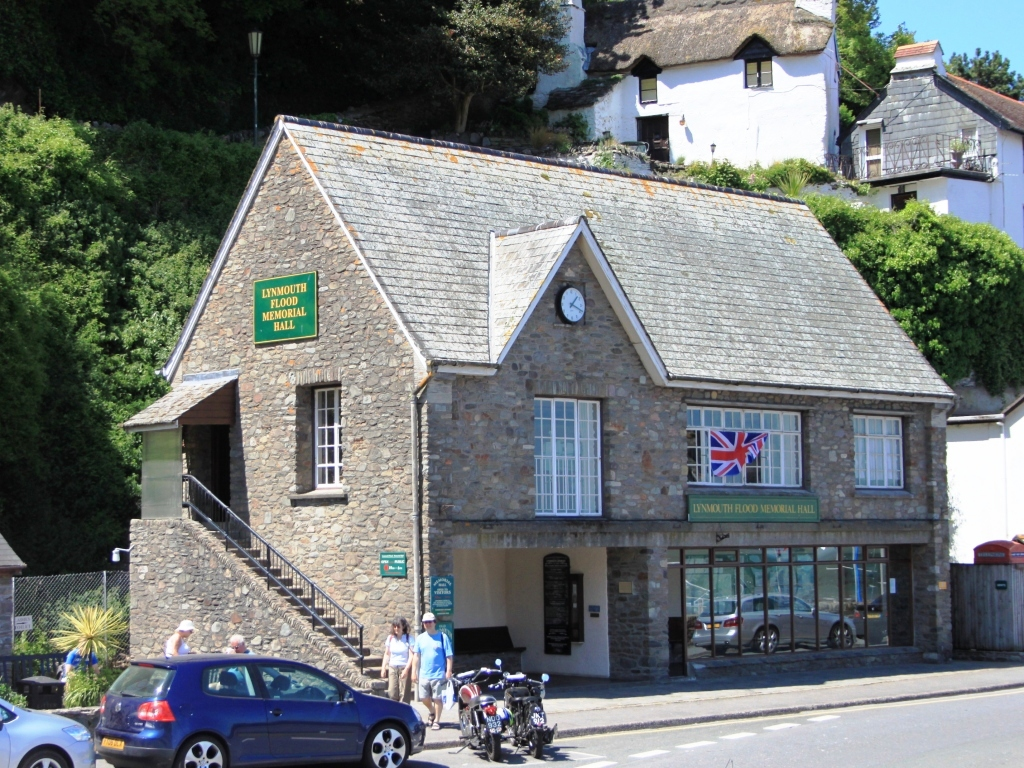
The Lynmouth Flood Memorial Hall which is the same shape and in the same location as the former lifeboat station

Lynmouth is on the north coast of Devon facing the Bristol Channel. In the nineteenth century this was a busy waterway carrying ships to ports such as Cardiff and Bristol. A lifeboat station was established in the town on 20 January 1869, five months after the nearby wreck of the sailing vessel Home. The lifeboat was kept in a shed on the beach until a purpose-built boat house was built at the harbour. This was rebuilt in 1898 and enlarged in 1906–07.

The RNLI introduced motor lifeboats to the area in the 1930s. Ilfracombe, the station to the west, received theirs in 1936 and Minehead, to the east, in 1939. These boats were able to serve the whole of the Exmoor coast and so Lynmouth Lifeboat Station was closed at the end of 1944. The boat house was then used as a club but was washed away in the Lynmouth flood of 15 August 1952. It has since been rebuilt and includes a public shelter.

== Launch from Porlock Weir ==
The Forrest Hall, a 1,900-ton, three-masted ship with thirteen crew and five apprentices sailing down the channel from Bristol, got into trouble several miles east of Lynmouth on the evening of 12 January 1899. A severe gale had been blowing all day. She was being towed but lost her rudder and the rope broke; it looked as though she might be blown onto the shore. At 19:52 a telegram reporting the problem was received at Lynmouth. The storm prevented a launch from the harbour so the Coxswain, Jack Crowcombe, proposed that the lifeboat be taken over land to Porlock Weir so that it could be launched there instead. This would entail a journey of 15 miles (24 km) and a climb of 1,423 feet (434 m).

Louisa was 34 feet (10 m) long and weighed 10 tons on its carriage. Six men were sent ahead to widen some parts of the road that were too narrow while about 100 people, helped by 18 horses from Lynton, hauled the boat up the 1 in 4 (25%) Countisbury Hill. The carriage had to be repaired at one point when a wheel came off. At the top of the hill they took refreshments at the Blue Ball Inn then most of the people including the women and children turned back, leaving just 20 men to control the boat as it descended another 1 in 4 hill down into Porlock. More horses were obtained from local farmers to bring the team up to about 20 (although four died during the journey). At Porlock the road was too narrow because of a wall but the owner let the men take down the corner of the house so that they could pass. Lower down a road had been washed away by the sea so a detour was necessary. The lifeboat finally reached the sea at 06:30 on 13 January.

The crew launched straight away. After their 11-hour journey across Exmoor, they now had to row for an hour into the storm to reach the Forrest Hall which was anchored close to Hurlstone Point. The lifeboat stood by – the crew rowing continuously to hold a safe position – until daylight when two tugs arrived and managed to get a new rope across. Some of the lifeboatmen went on board to help raise the anchors as the crew were too tired to do it themselves. The tugs took the ship across the channel to Barry, accompanied by the Louisa and the Lynmouth lifeboat volunteers in case there were further problems. They finally arrived in port at about 05:00 on 14 January. The lifeboat crew were towed back to Lynmouth by a steam ship.

The journey was re-enacted in daylight on 12 January 1999. The roads had been improved in the intervening hundred years, but the weather was similarly poor. Another re-enactment was planned for 13 January 2024.

== Lifeboats ==
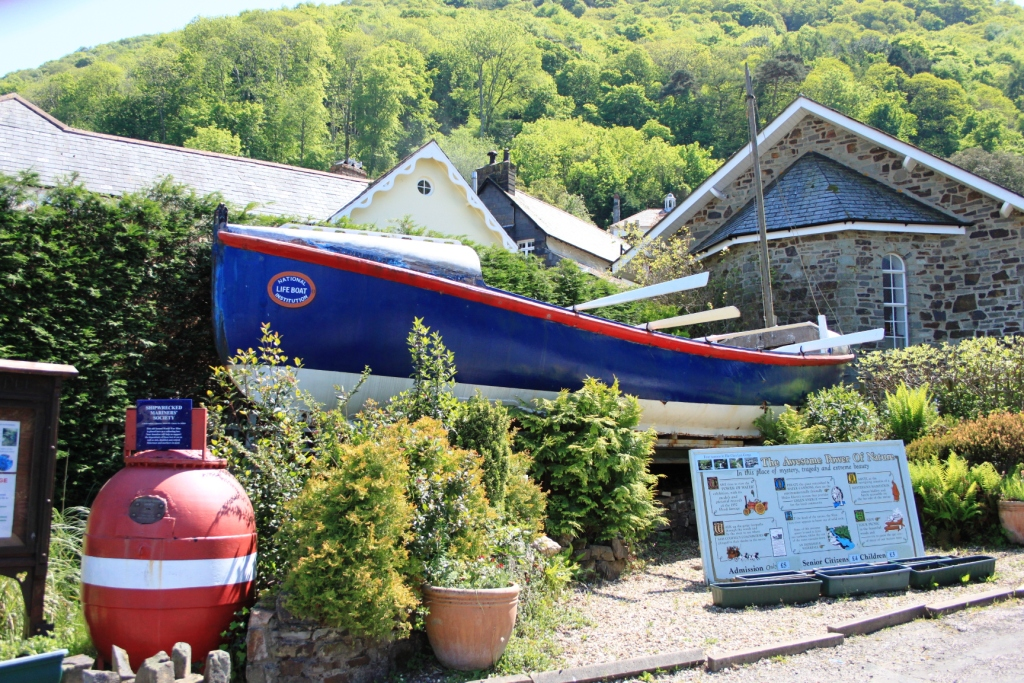
The Docea Chapman is displayed at Lynmouth as a reminder of the Louisa and other Lynmouth lifeboats.

All lifeboats at Lynmouth were 'pulling and sialing' boats of the standard self-righting type.

At Lynmouth	ON	Name	Length	Comments
1869–1887	—	Henry	30 feet (9.1 m)	
1887–1906	54	Louisa	34 feet (10.4 m)	
1906–1944	558	Pritchard Frederick Gainer	35 feet (10.7 m)	Broken up at Felixstowe Ferry in 2022 by which time it had been converted to a houseboat.

== See also ==
- List of former RNLI stations
- Royal National Lifeboat Institution lifeboats
