= Affective meditation =

Christian spiritual practice

Affective meditation is a Christian spiritual practice originating in Medieval Europe by which a pilgrim, worshipper, or other follower of Christ seeks to imagine the sights, sounds, tastes, smells, movement, and tactility of specific scenes from canonical Gospels and their characters, with particular emphasis on empathising with the compassion and suffering of Jesus and the joys and sorrows of the Virgin Mary, leading to the authentic and spontaneous expression of emotion.

== History ==
=== Middle Ages ===
Affective meditation is the spiritual practice around which the tradition and philosophy of affective piety revolves, and was initiated by Saint Anselm of Canterbury, subsequently by Bernard of Clairvaux, and latterly by Francis of Assisi, who are credited with spawning an expressive form of worship through which members of the clergy, monastic orders, and laity visualized and envisioned scenes from the life of Christ with which they empathized to such degree that their compassionate identification with the suffering of him and his mother Mary manifested in emotive vocal sounds and physical movements.

The following excerpt from a work by English writer, Abbot and saint Aelred of Rievaulx is indicative of instructions provided by Christians in the tradition of affective piety.

...follow her [the Virgin Mary] as she goes to Bethlehem, and turning away from the inn with her, help and humor her during the birth; and when the little child is placed in the manger, burst out words of exultation, crying out with Isaiah: A child is born to us, a son is given to us...Embrace that sweet manger, let love conquer bashfulness, and emotion drive out fear so that you fix your lips on those most sacred feet and repeat the kisses.

A further example comes from the writings of English hermit, mystic, and religious writer Richard Rolle, who expresses his empathy with the suffering of Christ in his work Meditation on the Passion.

Ah, Lord, your sorrow--why was it not my death? Now they lead you forth as naked as a worm, with torturers around you and armed knights. The press of the crowd was incredibly intense as they threw things and harried you so shamefully, kicking at you as if you had been a dog. I see in my soul how ruefully you walk, your body so bloody, so raw and blistered. The crown on your head is so sharp, and your hair, blown in the wind, is all matted with blood. Your lovely face is so pale and swollen with the blows and the beatings, and covered with spittle and phlegm. And down runs your blood; it horrifies me to see it.

=== 20th century onwards ===
The experience of affective meditation is most often precipitated by meditating or concentrating attention on Christian drawings or paintings, music, or literature depicting the experience of Jesus and the Virgin Mary, until the meditator's empathy with the subjects of those depictions becomes sufficiently intense to precipitate emotive expression that may include tears and crying, vocal sounds and prayer, as well as bodily movements.

During the late 1970s, psychologist, Yoga teacher, and organist at Culbone Church Joan D'Arcy Cooper, began to explore using the stories told by and about Jesus as spoken scripts with which to lead members of the parish through visualizations and guided meditations in the tradition of affective meditation.

In 1982, Cooper published Guided Meditation and the Teachings of Jesus in which she suggests that the words of Jesus, as recorded in the canonical gospels, may perhaps have been intended to be considered, and are enriched by hearing or reading them as guided meditations, through which the reader or listener can meditate upon the message and meaning inherent in the text, and thereby come to know God.

While affective meditation is a marginal practice, Cooper's books and teachings, and the creative approach to Christian meditative practice that she encouraged, was acknowledged as making an important contribution to the New Age era and movement, characterized by a personal and individualist exploration of various meditative and contemplative traditions outside the boundaries and purview of formal doctrine and religious organizations, including those originating in Christianity, Hinduism, and Buddhism.
