= James Cowie (artist) =

Scottish painter and teacher (1886-1956)

- Born: 16 May 1886; Cuminestown, Aberdeenshire
- Died: 18 April 1956 (aged 69); Edinburgh
- Education: Aberdeen University; Glasgow School of Art
- Known for: Painting, drawing

James Cowie RSA (16 May 1886 – 18 April 1956) was a Scottish painter and teacher. The quality of his portrait paintings and his strong linear style made him among the most individual Scottish painters of the 1920s and 1930s. His work displayed meticulous draughtsmanship which was based on his studies of the Old Masters and his use of many preparatory drawings.

== Life and work ==
Cowie was born on a farm in Cuminestown, Aberdeenshire into a family of non-conformist farmers. After attending Fraserburgh Academy he studied English literature at Aberdeen University but failed to graduate. After obtaining a teacher training qualification in drawing, from the United Free Church Training College, he took a teaching position at Fraserburgh Academy in 1909. He resigned this post to enroll at the Glasgow School of Art, where he completed his Diploma in two years between 1912 and 1914. Shortly before the start of the First World War, Cowie was appointed art master at Bellshill Academy near Glasgow. During the war he registered as a conscientious objector and, after appearing before the Glasgow Military Service Tribunal, he agreed to serve in the Non-Combatant Corps. He worked as a labourer at a camp near Edinburgh before being assigned, in October 1917, to the Agricultural Company Gordon Highlanders. After the war, Cowie resumed teaching art at Bellshill where he remained for almost twenty years. During this time he continued to paint, often producing portraits of his students based on detailed preparatory sketches done in pencil or watercolour.

Cowie held his first solo exhibition at the McLellan Galleries in Glasgow in 1935 and the same year he took the post of Head of Painting at Gray's School of Art. In 1937 Cowie became the warden of the Patrick Allan Fraser School of Art at Hospitalfield House. Cowie produced some of his finest work at Hospitalfield and also taught at the annual summer school there. He painted a number of group portraits of the other artists and students at Hospitalfield. Among his pupils were Robert Colquhoun, Robert MacBryde, Patrick Hennessy, Robert Henderson Blyth, Waistel Cooper and Joan Eardley. In October 1941 Cowie was commissioned by the War Artists' Advisory Committee to produce a portrait of a Scottish Civil Defence worker. During the conflict he also ran a drawing class at a local Royal Navy base.

Throughout the 1940s Cowie developed an interest in Surrealism and began to experiment with perspective in his works. In 1944 he completed a large oil painting, Evening Star, notable for its use of metaphysical elements and objects placed within a landscape. In 1948 the University of Edinburgh awarded Cowie an honorary degree. A 1950 commission to paint a mural for the Usher Hall came to nothing. In 1952 Cowie suffered a severe stroke from which he never fully recovered.

In 1957 a memorial exhibition to Cowie was organised by the Scottish Committee of the Arts Council.

== Memberships ==
- 1936 Associate, Royal Scottish Academy
- 1943 Member, Royal Scottish Academy
- 1948 Secretary, Royal Scottish Academy
