= Waistel Cooper =

British studio potter (1921–2003)

Waistel Cooper (19 April 1921 – 15 January 2003) was a British studio potter.

== Biography ==
Cooper was born in Ayr, Scotland and initially studied painting at Hospitalfield School of Art during 1937 and 1938. At Hospitalfield, Waistel was taught by James Cowie who used Waistel as a model for his masterpiece 'An Outdoor School of Painting', in collection of the Tate Gallery. Waistel's fellow students at Hospitalfield included Robert MacBryde, Robert Colquhoun, Patrick Hennessey and Robert Henderson Blythe. Subsequently, Waistel won a painting scholarship to Edinburgh College of Art, though these studies were interrupted by World War II.

Cooper first flirted with pottery on a portrait commission in Iceland, and returned to England to set up a pottery studio in the village of Porlock, Somerset in 1950.

Henry Rothschild (1913–2009) gave Cooper a one-man show at his craft gallery Primavera in August 1955. Often compared to contemporary London based studio potters Hans Coper and Lucie Rie, Cooper's rural lifestyle meant that he was largely isolated from London trends. Cooper stated, "I met Lucie Rie and Hans Coper in the fifties and felt a very strong kinship with the direction their work was taking, in so far as it was concerned, as was mine, with sculptural form and texture, and was light years away from the Japonaiserie of the Bernard Leach school of pottery."

In 1957 Cooper moved to the nearby hamlet of Culbone, where he re-established his pottery. He remained at Culbone for 25 years, before moving to Penzance in 1982.

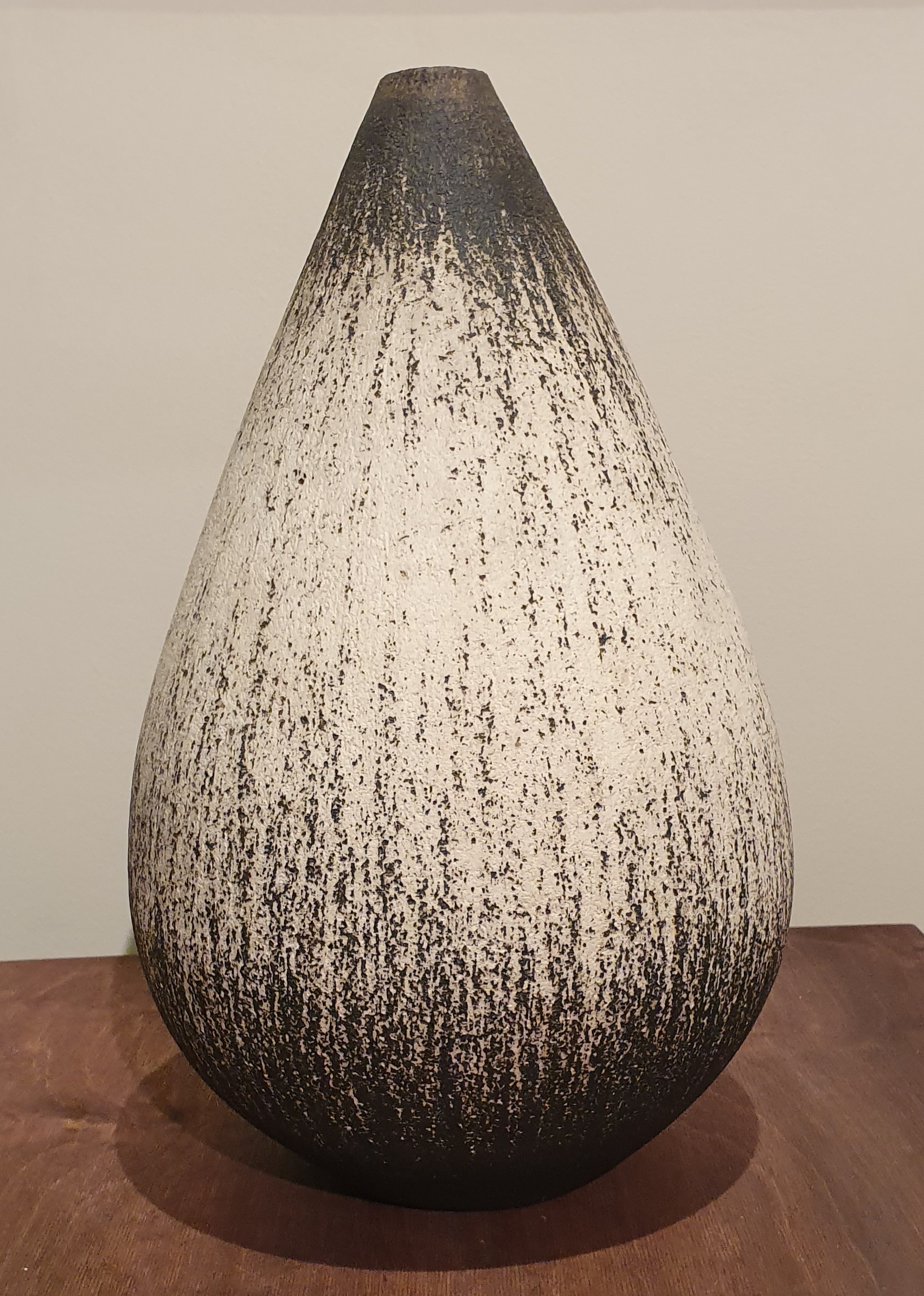
Waistel Cooper - Teardrop Vase, stoneware, circa 1960

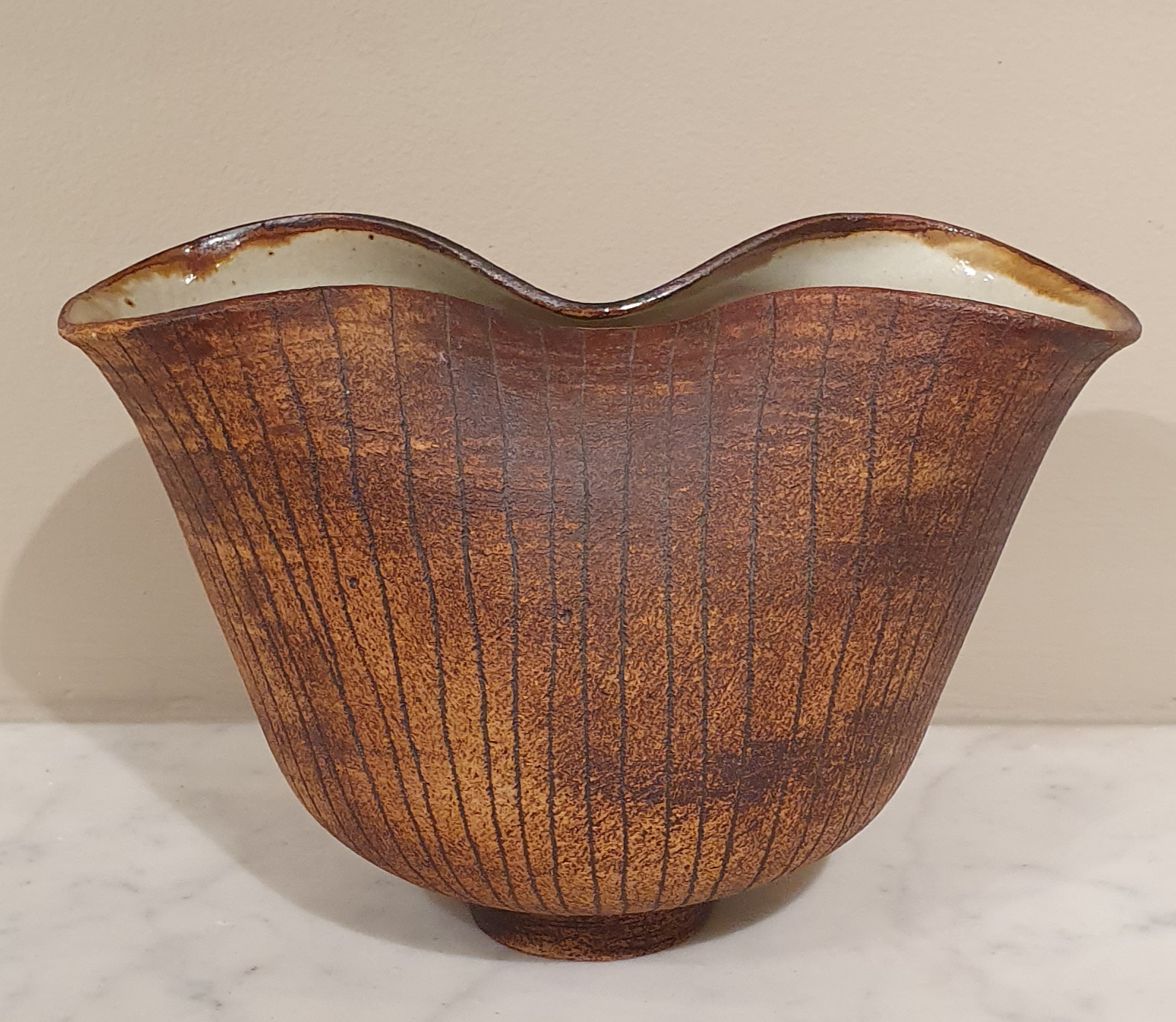
Waistel Cooper - Clamshell Vase, stoneware, circa 1950s..
