= Person on business from Porlock =

Figure in literature

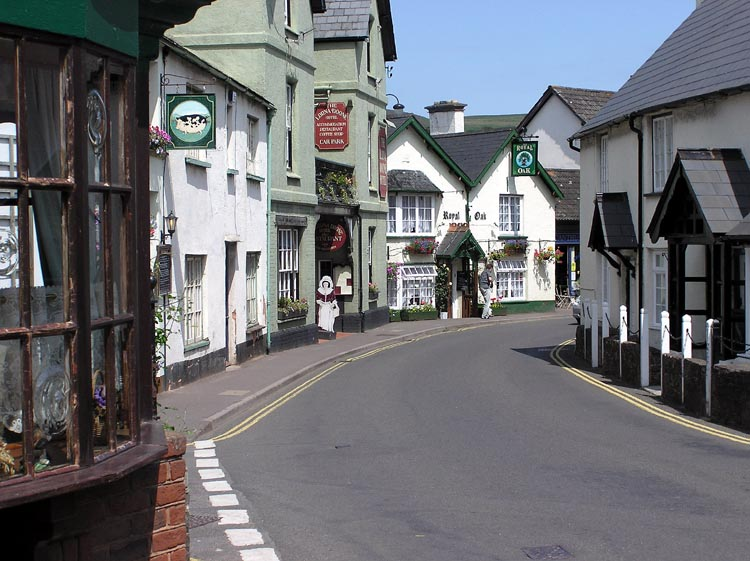
Porlock village, Somerset, England

The "person on business from Porlock" was an apocryphal unwelcome visitor to Samuel Taylor Coleridge during his composition of the poem "Kubla Khan" in 1797. Coleridge claimed to have perceived the entire course of the poem in a dream (possibly an opium-induced haze), but was interrupted by a visitor who came "on business from Porlock" while in the process of writing it. "Kubla Khan", only 54 lines long, was never completed. Thus "person from Porlock", "man from Porlock", or just "Porlock" has come to be a literary allusion to unwanted intruders who disrupt inspired creativity.

== Story ==
In 1797, Coleridge lived at Nether Stowey, a village in the foothills of the Quantocks. However, due to ill health, he "retired to a lonely farm house between Porlock and Lynton, on the Exmoor confines of Somerset and Devonshire". It is unclear whether the incident took place at Culbone Parsonage or at Ash Farm. Coleridge described the interruption in his first publication of the poem, writing about himself in the third person:

On awakening he appeared to himself to have a distinct recollection of the whole, and taking his pen, ink, and paper, instantly and eagerly wrote down the lines that are here preserved. At this moment he was unfortunately called out by a person on business from Porlock, and detained by him above an hour, and on his return to his room, found, to his no small surprise and mortification, that though he still retained some vague and dim recollection of the general purport of the vision, yet, with the exception of some eight or ten scattered lines and images, all the rest had passed away like the images on the surface of a stream into which a stone has been cast, but, alas! without the after restoration of the latter!

== Speculations ==
In her 1953 book Coleridge, Opium and "Kubla Khan", Elisabeth Schneider suggested that the prologue and person from Porlock were fictional and intended to explain the poem's seemingly fragmentary state as published. Poet Stevie Smith also suggested this view in one of her own poems, saying "the truth is I think, he was already stuck".
