= Culbone Church =

Church in Culbone, Somerset, England

St Beuno's Church, Culbone
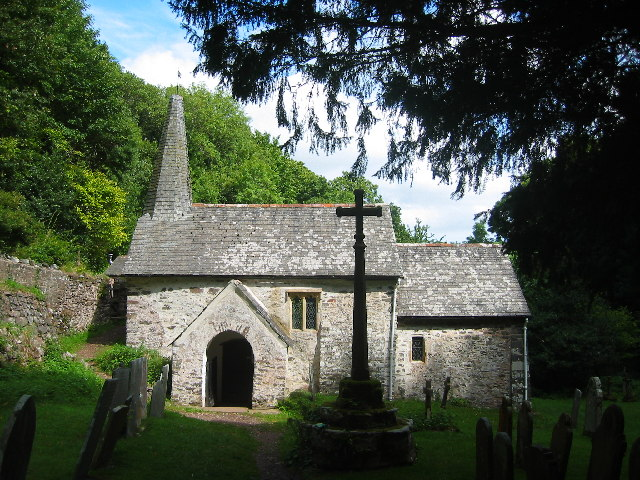

- Culbone within Somerset
- 51°13′17″N 3°39′32″W
- OS grid reference: SS842482
- Country: England
- Denomination: Church of England

History
- Status: Parish church
- Dedication: St Beuno

Architecture
- Functional status: Active

Specifications
- Length: 35 feet (11 m)

Administration
- Diocese: Bath & Wells
- Parish: Porlock

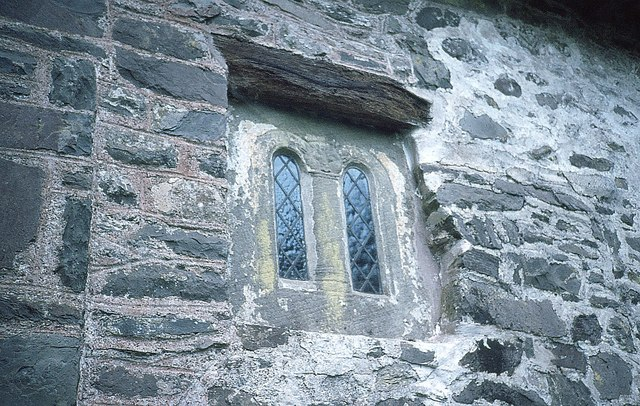
Saxon window, chancel north wall

Culbone Church, located in the village of Culbone in Somerset, is said to be the smallest parish church in England. The church, dedicated to the Welsh saint Beuno, has been designated by English Heritage as a Grade I listed building and the churchyard cross is Grade II*.

== History ==
The church is probably pre-Norman in origin, with a 13th-century porch and a late-15th-century nave. It was refenestrated and re-roofed around 1810 and the spirelet added in 1888. It underwent further restoration in 1928.

Joan D'Arcy Cooper, psychologist, Yoga teacher, author of Guided Meditation and the Teaching of Jesus, and wife of the potter Waistel Cooper, was organist at the church and is buried in the graveyard. The graveyard also contains a war grave of a soldier of the Welsh Guards of World War II. Sir David Calcutt QC, a barrister and public servant, is buried in the churchyard.

Services are still held despite the lack of access by road.

== Architecture ==
The interior scale and decoration suggest Anglo-Saxon origins. The east end is restored. There is a small window, carved from a single block of sandstone, outside the north wall of the chancel, with a face on top of the pillar dividing the two window lights. This is probably also Saxon.

The nave has box pews, including a Jacobean squire's pew for the occupier of Ashley Combe House. The church can seat about thirty people. The chancel is 13.5 × 10 feet (4.1 × 3.0 m), the nave 21.5 × 12.33 feet (6.6 × 3.8 m) and the building has a total length of 35 feet (10.7 m). The font sits on a victorian support but the bowl is far older possibly dating back to the Saxon period.

The church has 2 bells with the older dating to the 14th century while the young one dates to the 17th.

== Access ==
The church is passed by the South West Coast Path, but drivers must turn off the A39 opposite the village pub, and park where possible on the narrow track. There is then a walk of 1.5 miles (2.4 km) described by Simon Jenkins as "through steep woods of walnut and oak, glorious on a summer's day with the sea glinting through the trees, darkly mysterious and dripping with water in winter".

== In media ==
The church has been used for filming including a television version of Lorna Doone; the video for Mike and the Mechanics' 1988 song "The Living Years", and 2016 BBC television series Coastal Path, with Paul Rose.

== See also ==
- Grade I listed buildings in West Somerset
- List of ecclesiastical parishes in the Diocese of Bath and Wells
