= Culbone =

Hamlet in Somerset, England

Coordinates: 51.221°N 3.659°W

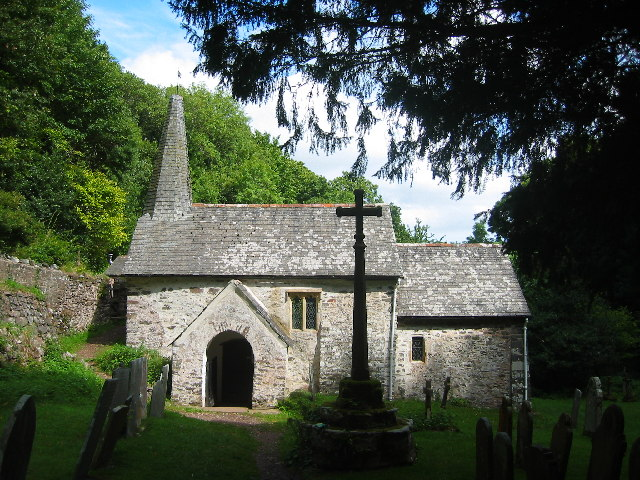
- Culbone Church

- Location within Somerset
- OS grid reference: SS842482
- Civil parish: Oare
- Unitary authority: Somerset
- Ceremonial county: Somerset
- Region: South West
- Country: England
- Sovereign state: United Kingdom
- Post town: MINEHEAD
- Postcode district: TA24
- Dialling code: 01643
- Police: Avon and Somerset
- Fire: Devon and Somerset
- Ambulance: South Western
- UK Parliament: Tiverton and Minehead

Culbone (also called Kitnor) is a hamlet consisting of little more than the parish church and a few houses, in the civil parish of Oare in the Exmoor National Park, Somerset, England. As there is no road access it is a two-mile walk from Porlock Weir, and some four miles from Porlock itself.

The village is situated in a sheltered spot, near the coast of Porlock Bay. The slopes behind the village rise to the height of 1,200 feet (366 m), over which a small stream falls down to the sea.

The South West Coast Path goes through the village, parts of which were closed and diverted in February 2007 following landslips in the woods. The woods around the village are home to the rare Sorbus vexans, a microspecies of self-cloning Sorbus trees which are only found in the coastal area between Culbone and Trentishoe in Devon. It is amongst the rarest trees in Britain. Other Whitebeam and Rowan species found in the area include; Sorbus subcuneata, Sorbus ‘Taxon D’ and Sorbus aucuparia.

== History ==
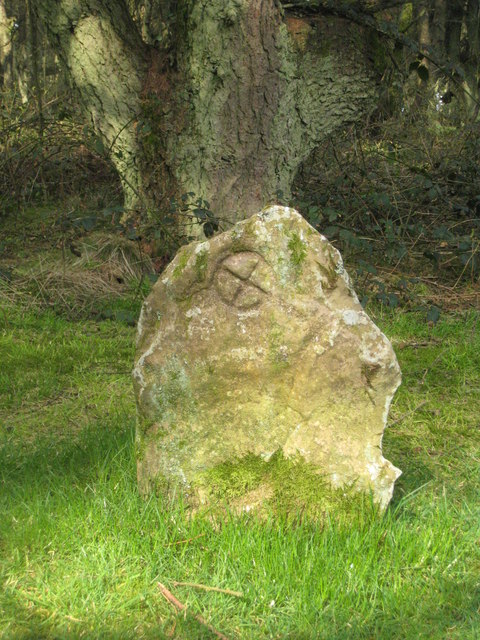
Culbone Stone

Culbone was listed in the Domesday Book as Kytenore, or Chetnore. The name "Culbone" is thought to derive from the Celtic cil beun' for "Church of St Beuno".

The Culbone Stone, an early mediaeval standing stone approximately one metre in height, lies in woodland close to the parish boundary, and features an incised wheeled cross, the style of which suggests it dates from 7th to 9th century. The stone is legally protected as a scheduled ancient monument. It has been suggested that the stone has been moved from its original site as part of the Culbone Hill Stone Row.

In the 14th century Culbone's steep woods were used as a colony for French prisoners, and again in 1720 as a prison colony. The woods were once the site of a major charcoal burning industry, the original burners for which were reputed to be a colony of lepers. Although the lepers were not allowed into the village, there is a small leper window in the north wall of the church.

In 1931 the parish had a population of 43. On 1 April 1933 the parish was abolished and merged with Oare.

Culbone Cottage, Culbone Lodge, and the Parsonage Farmhouse are all Grade II listed buildings.

== Church ==
Culbone Church is said to be the smallest parish church in England. The chancel is 13.5 feet (4.1 m) × 10 feet (3.0 m), the nave 21.5 feet (6.6 m) × 12.33 feet (3.8 m) and the building has a total length of 35 feet (10.7 m). It seats about 30 and is dedicated to St Beuno. Services are still held there, despite the lack of road access.

The church is probably pre-Norman in origin, with a 13th-century porch, and late 15th-century nave. It was refenestrated and reroofed around 1810 and the spirelet added in 1888. It underwent further restoration in 1928. It has been designated by English Heritage as a Grade I listed building.

== Samuel Taylor Coleridge ==
The "person on business from Porlock" is believed to have disturbed Samuel Taylor Coleridge during his composition of the oriental poem Kubla Khan. Coleridge was living at Coleridge Cottage, Nether Stowey (between Bridgwater and Minehead). Coleridge later stated he wrote the poem at Brimstone Farm, though no such farm has ever existed. It is likely that this encounter took place while he was staying at either Broomstreet Farm or Ash Farm near Culbone. It is also possible that Coleridge composed the poem at the Culbone parsonage near Ash Farm, now a collection of holiday cottages.
