= Affective piety =

Emotional devotion to the humanity of Jesus

Affective piety is most commonly described as a style of highly emotional devotion to the humanity of Jesus, particularly in his infancy and his death, and to the joys and sorrows of the Virgin Mary. It was a major influence on many varieties of devotional literature in late-medieval Europe, both in Latin and in the vernaculars. This practice of prayer, reading, and meditation was often cultivated through visualization and concentration on vivid images of scenes from the Bible, Saints' Lives, Virgin Mary, Christ and religious symbols, feeling from the result. These images could be either conjured up in people's minds when they read or heard poetry and other pieces of religious literature, or they could gaze on manuscript illuminations and other pieces of art as they prayed and meditated on the scenes depicted. In either case, this style of affective meditation asked the "viewer" to engage with the scene as if she or he were physically present and to stir up feelings of love, fear, grief, and/or repentance for sin.

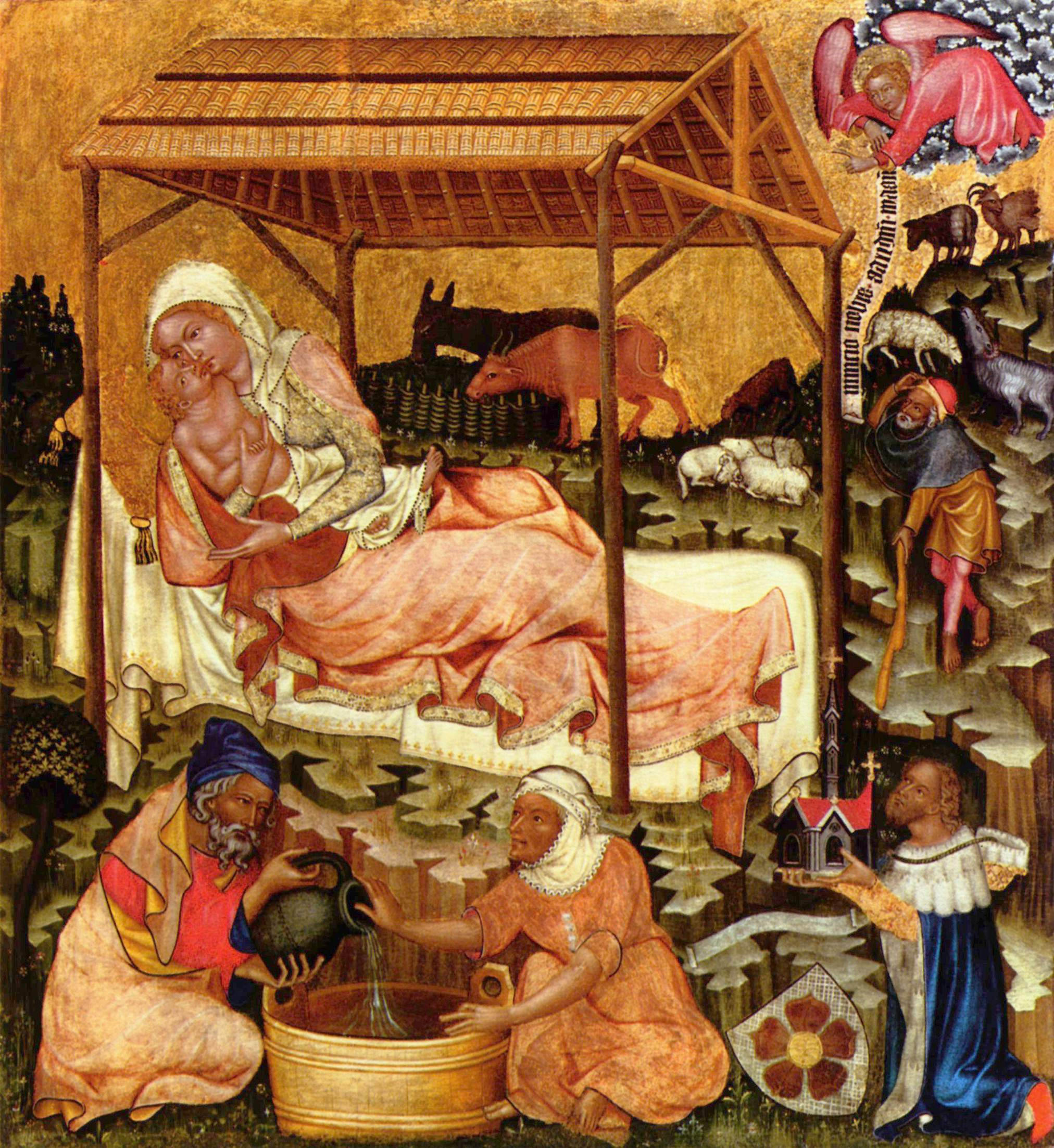
Nativity Scene, Master of Vyšší Brod (c. 1350). Národni Galerie Prague.

While the texts and art of affective piety could focus on a variety of subjects, they are particularly noted for their gory and violent depictions of the Passion and Crucifixion, as in Richard Rolle's Meditation on the Passion:

Ah, Lord, your sorrow—why was it not my death? Now they lead you forth as naked as a worm, with torturers around you and armed knights. The press of the crowd was incredibly intense as they threw things and harried you so shamefully, kicking at you as if you had been a dog. I see in my soul how ruefully you walk, your body so bloody, so raw and blistered. The crown on your head is so sharp, and your hair, blown in the wind, is all matted with blood. Your lovely face is so pale and swollen with the blows and the beatings, and covered with spittle and phlegm. And down runs your blood; it horrifies me to see it.

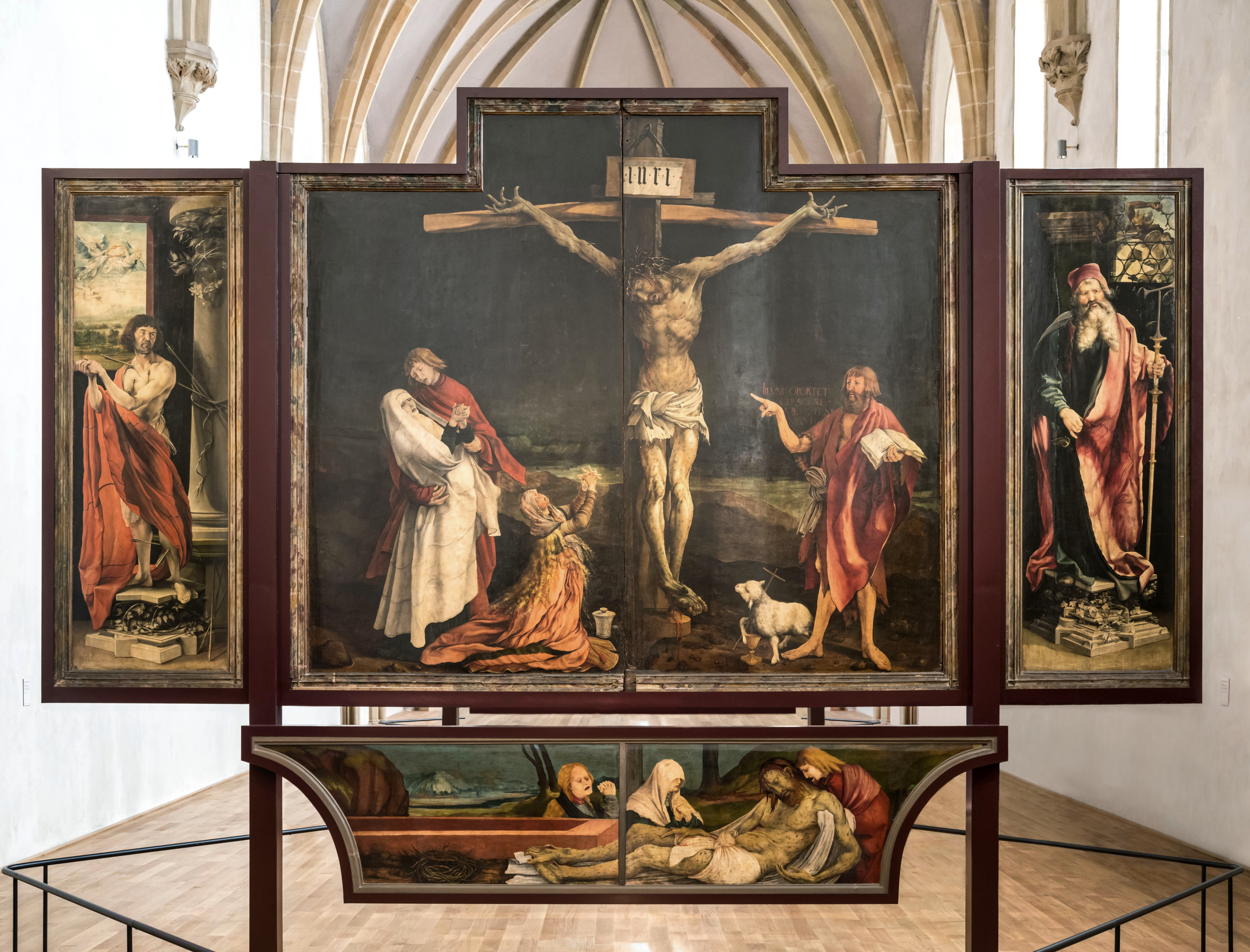
Isenheim Altarpiece, Niclaus of Haguenau (for the sculpted portion) and Grünewald (for the painted panels), 1512–1516. Musée Unterlinden, Colmar.

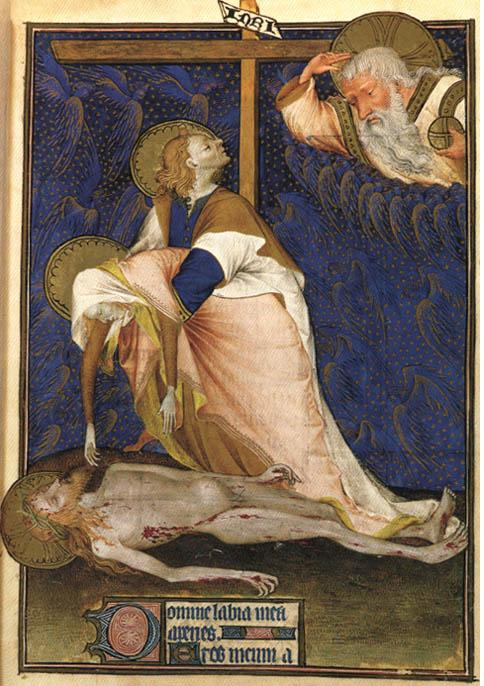
Rohan Hours, "Lamentation of the Virgin", (f. 135) Bibliothèque Nationale, Paris, M.S. Latin 9471.

Margery Kempe is often used to demonstrate the practice of late-medieval affective piety. In the autobiographical book she dictated to two different scribes, Margery describes her imaginative and emotional reaction during Palm Sunday services:

Sche had many an holy thowt of owr Lordys passyon and beheld hym in hir gostly
syght as verily as he had ben aforn hir in hir bodily syght. Therfor myth sche not
wythstondyn wepyng and sobbyng, but sche must nedys wepyn, cryin, and sobbyn
whan sche beheld hir Savyowr suffyr so gret peynys for hir lofe.

The Isenheim Altarpiece provides a good, late instance of a piece of art meant to engage the emotions. Images for more intimate, private use can be found in Books of Hours and other manuscripts.

== Summary ==
Affective piety can be described as a type of highly emotional devotion, focused on the humanity of Jesus, which developed during the High Middle Ages. Anselm of Canterbury, Bernard of Clairvaux, and Francis of Assisi each played a key role in the development of this approach to spirituality. Traces of an affective sensitivity can be found in Late Antiquity, when clergymen preached sermons with vivid descriptions of the Passion. One example of this is an Eastertide sermon by St. Augustine:

The Passion of the Lord signifies our time, in which we now weep. Whips, fetters, mockings, spit, crown of thorns, embittered wine, vinegar in a sponge, insults, taunts, finally the cross itself, the holy limbs hanging on the wood, what does this signify to us, if not the time in which we act, the time of mourning, the time of mortality, the time of temptation?

== The origins and functions of affective piety: the current scholarly consensus ==
=== The "Southern Thesis" ===
In the chapter on high medieval spirituality in his book The Making of the Middle Ages, the medievalist Richard W. Southern was building on the work of scholars such as André Wilmart and Étienne Gilson. Nevertheless, he is generally credited with having drawn attention to what he (and others) understood to be a shift in devotional practice at the start of the High Middle Ages. He described a "mood of emotional tenderness which runs through the literature of the twelfth century" and considered Anselm of Canterbury to be the quintessential example of an eleventh-century "urge towards a greater measure of solitude, of introspection, and self-knowledge," an urge that "ran like fire through Europe in the generation after his death and produced an outburst of meditations and spiritual soliloquies." Southern, who would go on to write two different biographies of Anselm, argued that "Anselm was the founder of the new type of ardent and effusive self-disclosure," but that "it was the Cistercians who produced the greatest volume, and, as it were, set the fashion in this type of literature."

On Southern's view, both Anselm and the Cistercian abbot Bernard of Clairvaux gave form in their writings to a "theme of tenderness and compassion for the sufferings and helplessness of the Saviour of the world." Anselm, he wrote, "dwelt with passionate intensity on the details of Christ's sufferings," and his prayers "opened up a new world of ardent emotion and piety." Southern attributed this "new feeling about the humanity of the Saviour" to a shift in soteriology, the doctrine concerning how humanity comes to be "saved from the consequences of sin." Southern claimed that the "Devil's Rights", or Ransom Theory, left little room for human action, for according to it salvation was brought about in a "cosmic struggle" in which Satan had to be brought "to break the rules under which he held mankind in fee." Anselm (according to Southern) rejected this theory for one theologians call the Satisfaction Theory of Atonement, in which "Christ suffered as a substitute on behalf of humankind satisfying the demands of God's honor by his infinite merit." This allowed for a "fresh appreciation of the human sufferings of the Redeemer."
Anselm's Orationes sive meditationes (Prayers and Meditations) signalled something that Southern (in his 1990 biography of Anselm) called "The Anselmian Transformation": a shift from the brief, simple, corporate prayers of the Carolingian period to more introspective, private "prolonged ourpourings" spoken in "a language of self-revelation" infused with "theological insight." Anselm, Southern wrote, "added the discipline of exact thought and the warmth of exuberant feeling to the religious impulses of his day." Anselm's prayers work on the emotions; he "strains every resource of language to express and stimulate in his reader both the mental excitation and humiliation necessary for the double activity of self-examination and abasement in the presence of holiness."

In a later generation, Southern argued, Bernard of Clairvaux refined and built on this, and the "imaginative following of the details of the earthly life of Jesus, and especially of the sufferings of the Cross, became part of that programme of progress from carnal to spiritual love which we have called the Cistercian programme." Then, with "St. Francis and his followers, the fruits of the experiences of St. Anselm and St. Bernard were brought to the market place, and became the common property of the lay and clerical world alike." Concerning later affective piety, Southern writes that "the somewhat hectic piety of the fourteenth and fifteenth centuries" resulted from a weakening of the intellectual structure that gave rise to the "surge of pious devotion" of the eleventh and twelfth centuries.

Other scholars repeated this story over the next thirty years, either drawing on Southern's work or from the same sources. Notable among them are Louis L. Martz [The Poetry of Meditation: A Study in English Religious Literature of the Seventeenth Century (1954)], William A. Pantin [The English Church in the Fourteenth Century (1955)], Rosemary Woolf [The English Religious Lyric in the Middle Ages (1968)], Douglas Gray [Themes and Images in the Medieval English Lyric (1972)], and Elizabeth Salter [Nicholas Love's "Myrrour of the blessed lyf of Jesu Christ" (1974)]. The Southern Thesis also informs Richard Kieckhefer's book, Unquiet Souls (1984), even taking on explanatory force in his chapter on "Devotion to the Passion."

The Southern Thesis remains the basis of the standard definition of affective piety, as, for example, in this definition from an anthology of devotional literature:

The twelfth century is marked by the growth of affective piety, or a form of spirituality that differed from that of the previous centuries by placing much greater emphasis on self-examination, the inner emotions, and the cultivation of an interior life. This form of piety was typically anchored in devotion to Christ in his human form, with special attention to the events of the Passion. The movement was led first by the Cistercians Bernard of Clairvaux (d. 1153) and Aelred of Rievaulx (d. 1167); by the thirteenth century the movement came to be closely identified with Franciscan religiosity, especially as shaped by Francis of Assisi (d. 1226) and Bonaventure (d. 1274). The flamboyant piety of the late fourteenth and fifteenth centuries developed from these roots. Although it would be a mistake to view late medieval piety as homogeneous, its dominant expressions were notable for heightened degrees of emotionalism and a preoccupation with the tortured body of Christ and the grief of the Virgin Mary.

The same general outline is followed by Thomas H. Bestul in Texts of the Passion: Latin Devotional Literature and Medieval Society (1996), in his entry on "Devotional and Mystical Literature" in Medieval Latin: An Introduction and Bibliographical Guide (1999), and in his chapter "Meditatio/Meditation" in The Cambridge Companion to Christian Mysticism (2012).

A classic textual model for affective meditation is found in the De institutione inclusarum, or The Rule for Recluses, a text written by Aelred of Rievaulx for his sister, who was living as an anchoress (a female religious recluse). In the section of the text devoted to the Nativity of Jesus, Aelred wrote:

...follow her [the Virgin Mary] as she goes to Bethlehem, and turning away from the inn with her, help and humor her during the birth; and when the little child is placed in the manger, burst out words of exultation, crying out with Isaiah: A child is born to us, a son is given to us (Is. 9.6).
Embrace that sweet manger, let love conquer bashfulness, and emotion drive out fear so that you fix your lips on those most sacred feet and repeat the kisses.

=== The Franciscan popularization thesis ===
One common variation on the Southern Thesis describes affective piety from the thirteenth century on as essentially Franciscan. One early and still widely cited source for this opinion is F.J.E. Raby's A History of Christian-Latin Poetry. While David L. Jeffrey's book The Early English Lyric & Franciscan Spirituality (1975) did not study affective piety per se, the book followed on previous histories of spirituality (such as the Leclercq, Vandenbrouke, and Bouyer volume, The Spirituality of the Middle Ages) that describe "tender and affective meditation on Christ and especially on those mysteries of his life that are most apt to touch the heart—his birth, childhood, passion, and death," as being particularly "characteristic" of Franciscan piety. [Note that there were mixed reviews of Jeffrey's book.] Clarissa Atkinson's study Mystic and Pilgrim: the Book and World of Margery Kempe (1983), follows the "Southern Thesis" in the fifth chapter, "'In the Likeness of a Man': The Tradition of Affective Piety.. But she adds, "Of all the forces that helped to shape popular devotion in the Middle Ages, none was more significant than the Franciscans."" She elaborates on how Bernard of Clairvaux's devotion to and "adoration of the sacred humanity...was adapted by the Franciscans, who transformed it into a popular passion focused on the details of Christ's birth and death and used it to preach penitence to large numbers of lay as well as religious people."

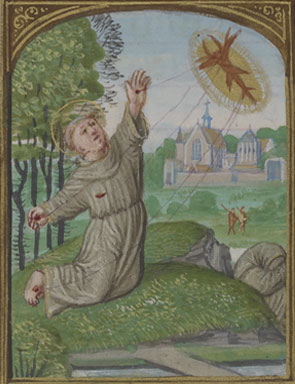
St. Francis Receiving the Stigmata, Book of Hours ( Belgium, c. 1525–1530). The Morgan Library & Museum.

In an article on "The Humanity and Passion of Christ" (1987), Ewert Cousins (drawing on Wilmart) lays out the trajectory from the Patristics, to monasticism, to Peter Damian, John of Fécamp and Anselm, to the Cistercians. But he also privileges St. Francis of Assisi, who he says ""[m]ore than any other saint or spiritual writer...transformed religious sensibility in the direction of devotion to the humanity of Christ." Much of the article focuses on affective meditations on the life of Christ as characteristically Franciscan. Another contribution to the same volume, Richard Kieckhefer's "Major Currents in Late Medieval Devotion", also alludes to Franciscan popularization of meditation on the humanity of Christ. Kieckhefer's earlier book Unquiet Souls: Fourteenth-Century Saints and Their Religious Milieu (1984) had dwelt in more detail on the influence of the Franciscans. Around the same time, Denise Despres published Ghostly Sights: Visual Meditation in Late-Medieval Literature (1989), a study influenced by Jeffrey's focus on the Franciscan contribution as well as John Fleming's support of Jeffrey's thesis in An Introduction to the Franciscan Literature of the Middle Ages (1977). In Despres' book, affective devotion is simply defined as "Franciscan meditation."

Sarah McNamer has pointed out that "The characterization of affective meditation as "Franciscan" is pervasive, even in studies published as recently as 2008." The recent studies she refers to include Eamon Duffy's The Stripping of the Altars, which, in a section on Passion devotions, reproduces the Southern Thesis with emphasis on the Franciscans and Sarah Beckwith's Christ's Body: Identity, Culture and Society in Late Medieval Writings. Beckwith, McNamer writes, "describes the 'emphatic fetishizing of Christ's torn and bleeding body' as 'Franciscanism' or 'Franciscan affectus'." McNamer also notes that in Powers of the Holy, David Aers "cites Richard Kieckhefer's characterization of the Bernardine-Franciscan transformation in late medieval piety approvingly." She quotes Aers, who writes that this transformation "has been exceptionally well-documented by numerous scholars in diverse disciplines of research." All this shows how "deeply entrenched the notion is that affective meditation is "Franciscan."

=== Feminism, gender, and the body: the Bynum Thesis ===
Beginning in the 1960s, scholars of medieval Christianity shifted from their previous focus on mystical experience to take up the study of popular religion and lay spirituality. Yet Caroline Walker Bynum could write in 1982 that "the spirituality of women...has been surprisingly neglected when we consider that the most important book on twelfth and thirteenth-century religion in the past fifty years has been Grundmann's study of the beguines." Herbert Grundmann's 1935 book, Religiöse Bewegungen im Mittelalter (Religious Movements in the Middle Ages), had been republished in 1961 and 1975, and it did end up having a great influence on the study of medieval women. The themes of this important historical study included "the twelfth-century quest for the 'apostolic life,' with particular sensitivity to the issue of poverty; the common inspiration of groups ending up both inside and outside the church (with comparisons of Francis and Waldo); the centrality of women in those movements; Innocent III's skillful and crucial handling of the mendicants; and the rise of a vernacular religious culture for the laity, especially lay women." Bynum's own work was key in bringing Grundmann's work on religious women and women's movements to the attention of American feminist scholars.

Starting in the late 1970s a generation of feminist medievalists from a variety of disciplines began the work of bringing women authors and women's religious experience into the mainstream of scholarship on medieval spirituality, and affective piety was soon taken to be a special attribute of medieval women's religious experience.

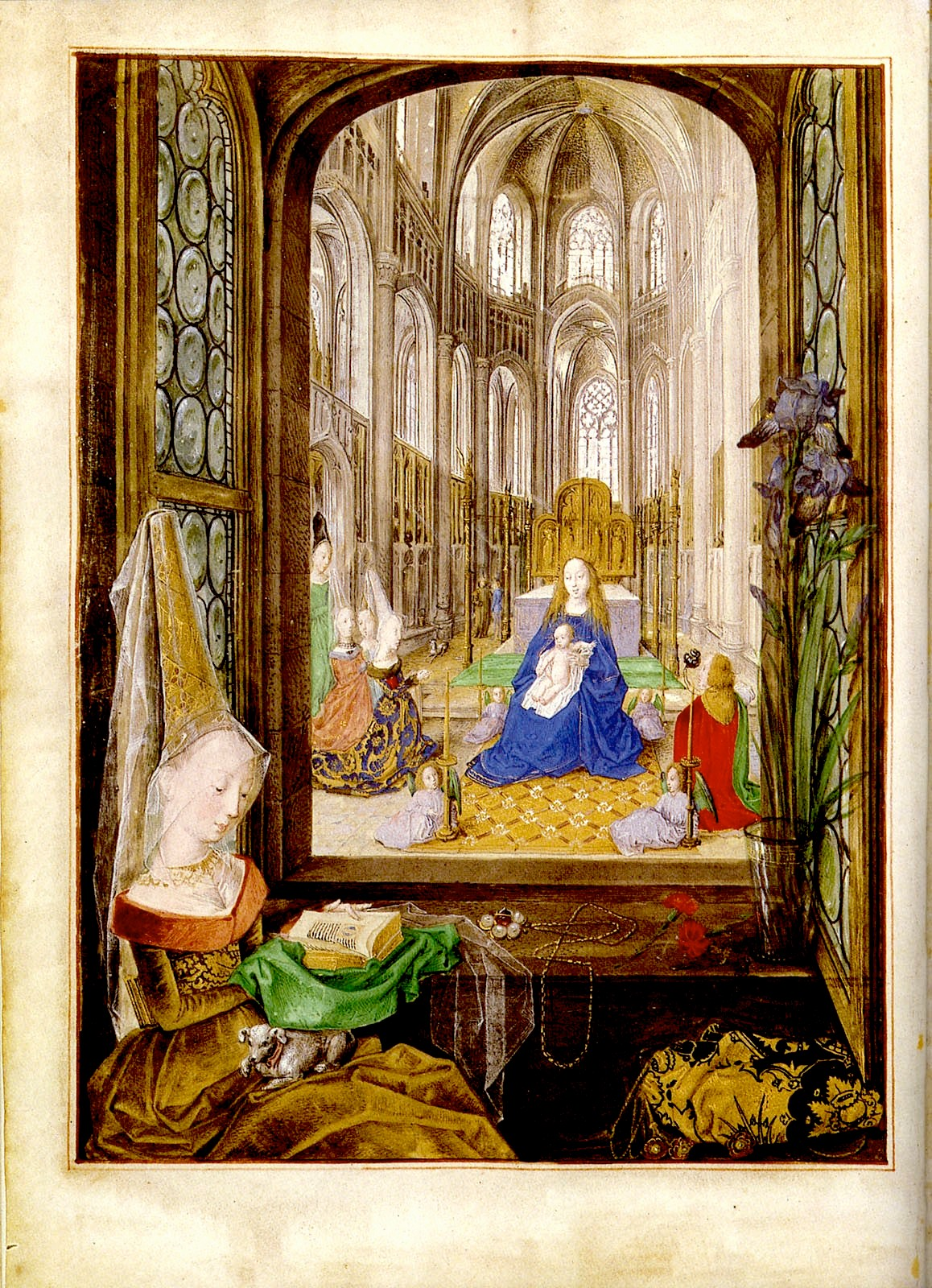
Hours of Mary of Burgundy, Flanders, c. 1477 (Vienna, Austrian National Library, cod. 1857, f. 14v)

For example, Clarissa Atkinson's book, Mystic and Pilgrim: The Book and World of Margery Kempe (1983), built on the work of Elizabeth Salter, Susan Dickman, Richard W. Southern, Giles Constable, and Caroline Walker Bynum for her description of the "affective piety" that shaped Margery Kempe's religious emotions and performances. Atkinson's book had great influence on the study of Margery Kempe, linking Kempe firmly to Affective Piety. As noted above, in "Chapter Five: 'In the Likeness of a Man,' The Tradition of Affective Piety'", she wrote a version of the Southern Thesis, adding sections on Franciscan popularization and on Richard Rolle as an author and proponent of fourteenth-century affective devotions. She also drew attention to the genre of Meditations on the Life of Christ, especially the version composed by Nicholas Love and circulated from 1410 on. Other significant touches are Atkinson's assertion that it was requests from pious women that prompted "churchmen" to "[produce] much of the devotional literature of Christianity," and the chapter's definition of the goal of affective piety: "intense feeling" that "included the 'compassion' that enabled Christians to participate in Christ's life and death, the 'contrition' that produced repentance and conversion, and the emotive, sensory accompaniments of an experience of the divine."

But it is Caroline Walker Bynum's 1982 collection of essays, Jesus as Mother (cited by Atkinson) and her 1987 book Holy Feast and Holy Fast: The Religious Significance of Food to Medieval Women that have had the greatest impact when it comes to questions of women, the body, and affective devotion. As Amy Hollywood has written, "no other scholar has done so much to shape feminist work on Christian spirituality." In the introduction to Jesus as Mother, Bynum includes the standard narrative, but builds on it:

...eleventh- and twelfth-century writers begin to stress Christ's humanity, both in affective and sentimentalized responses to the gospel story (e.g., the devotion of Marie of Oignes to the Christmas crêche) and in a new compulsion to build into the Christian life a literal imitation of the details of Jesus' ministry. The fundamental religious battle is now located within the self, and it is less a battle than a journey—a journey toward God. Hagiography, whose subjects more and more frequently are women and laity, focuses increasingly on inner virtues and experiences (often accompanied by external phenomena such as trances, levitation, and stigmata) rather than grand actions on the stage of history. Alongside the increase in efforts to stimulate affective responses, twelfth-century religious writing (most of which was produced by men) shows an outburst of mystical theology after hundreds of years of silence about it and a great increase in devotion to female figures, in use of feminine metaphors, and in admiration for characteristics (e.g., tears, weakness, and mercy or "ethical irrationality") that people of the period stereotyped as feminine.

The footnote to the last sentence quoted refers readers to the sub-sections of her chapter "Jesus and Mother and Abbot as Mother" entitled "The Theme of 'Mother Jesus' as a Reflection of Affective Spirituality" and The Feminization of Religious Language and Its Social Context."

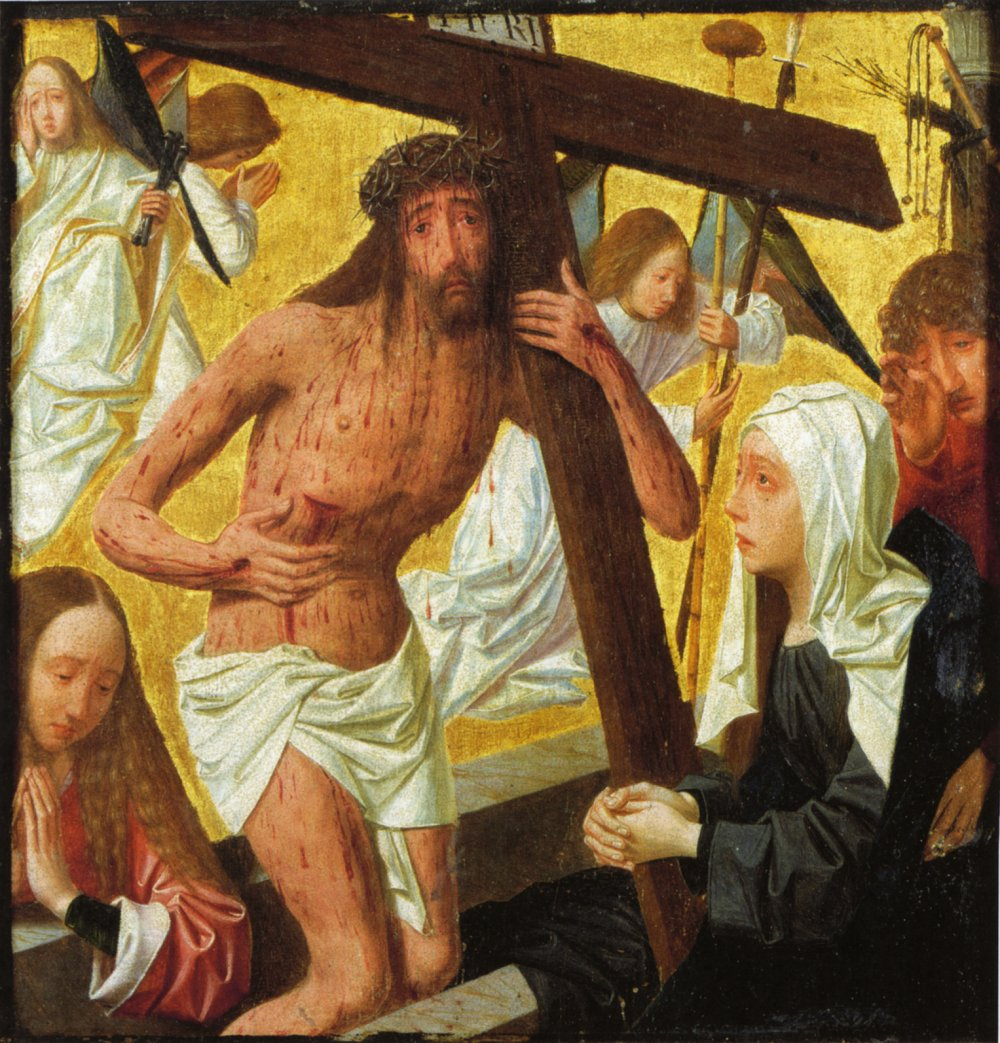
Christ as the Man of Sorrows, with Arma Christi. Netherlands, c. 1486

Jesus as Mother drew important attention to how gender and social contexts shaped religious experience and religious language, especially in regard to feminine metaphors and images for Christ, while Bynum's Holy Feast and Holy Fast: The Religious Significance of Food to Medieval Women (1987) turned specific attention to women's religious experiences. Both books, however, pursue the thesis that "women's spirituality in the Late Middle Ages differed in significant ways from men's". This book swiftly became "emblematic both within and beyond medieval studies." The so-called "Bynum Thesis" that originated from these studies is summed up in another of her oft-cited works, the chapter of Fragmentation and Redemption entitled "The Female Body and Religious Practice in the later Middle Ages"

Thus, as many recent scholars have argued, the spiritualities of male and female mystics were different, and this difference has something to do with the body. Women were more apt to somatize religious experience and to write in intense bodily metaphors; women mystics were more likely than men to receive graphically physical visions of God; both men and women were inclined to attribute to women and encourage in them intense asceticisms and ecstasies. Moreover, the most bizarre bodily occurrences associated with women (e.g., stigmata, incorruptibility of the cadaver in death, mystical lactations and pregnancies, catatonic trances, ecstatic nosebleeds, miraculous anorexia, eating and drinking pus, visions of bleeding hosts) either first appear in the twelfth and thirteenth centuries or increase significantly in frequency at that time. (194)

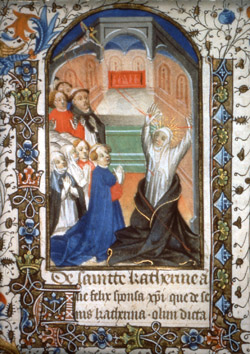
Saint Catherine of Siena receiving the stigmata. Book of Hours (c. 1440), Paris Bibliothèque Nationale, MS lat. 10533

The work of Bynum and the scholars who followed her (while this may not have been their intention) has resulted in a strand of thought in which the "bodily" meditations involved in Affective Piety are regarded as a feminized, if not female, practice. For one example, Sarah Beckwith's Christ's Body: Identity, Culture and Society in Late Medieval Writing (1993) amplifies on the Southern Thesis and stresses the Franciscan contribution. The book ends with a chapter on Margery Kempe which includes descriptions of Margery's "shared fleshliness" and "bodily identification" with Christ, of her graphic imaginings "rooted in the visceral compassion with the passion of Christ," of "her willing assumption of suffering," of her book's evocation of the image of Christ as mother (among other images), and of how her religiosity has a tendency to bypass the clergy. More recently, June L. Mecham has written: "Bynum illustrated the sophisticated ways in which female religious could turn the culturally negative associations of women with physicality into a positive position that enabled women to identify with the humanity of Christ. Subsequent research has continued to build upon Bynum's characterization, even as it questions the dichotomy of a somatic and ecstatic female spirituality versus an educated and intellectualized male religiosity."

Sarah McNamer's book, Affective Meditation and the Invention of Medieval Compassion (2010), builds on the Bynum Thesis. McNamer writes that "though it has had its critics, Bynum's model retains tremendous explanatory force." She argues:

1. that (in amplification of the Bynum Thesis) in certain medieval English texts written for women, "Bride of Christ" imagery functioned differently that it did in texts for men: "if the standard rituals were enacted, chastity observed, and, crucially, the fitting feelings repeatedly performed, female religious could become literally, by which I mean legally, married to Christ—not only in this life, but for all eternity" (28).
2. that (in a revision to the Southern Thesis that explicitly disagrees with Fulton's [See below,"Revising the Myth of Anselmian Origins]) the "chief 'catalyst' of the change in emotional attitudes towards Christ and his passion" was female devotional practice. "Women," McNamer writes, "were instrumental to this shift in sensibility at the very beginning." She argues (controversially) that John of Fécamp's Libellus precum (copies of which are known to have been sent to Agnes of Poitiers and to a nun) does not derive its "novel affectivity" from "John's private colloquys with God." Rather it was "a script for the performance of prayer, designed especially for the use of the women to whom it is addressed in the two surviving prefaces" (72). She concludes that meditations such as these and Anselm's (an early version of which was sent to a certain Adelaide, a royal nun, and a later, complete version to Matilda of Tuscany) "could justly be described as 'surfacings' of affective practices among women" that are consonant with the idea that women's compassionate love for Christ afforded them legal marriage to him here and in the next life (84).
3. that (in a revision of the Franciscan Thesis) the genre of meditations on the life of Christ, and, especially, the pseudo-Bonaventurian Meditationes vitae Christi, are evidence for "a tradition of affective meditation among women". She argues that "the original version of the Meditations was a short Italian text composed by one nun for another" that was then expanded, translated into Latin, and corrected by a male, Franciscan redactor (95–96). Her detailed research on this was published as an article in 2009. This thesis has not been accepted by all readers. A research group in the Program of Italian Literature and Culture at the Eötvös Loránd University of Budapest, while not disagreeing with McNamer, speculates on what detailed collation of the Latin Text and all the extant Italian texts might show, especially since such a collation was not part of her project. Michelle Karnes, however, includes in a footnote the observation, "McNamer has suggested that the Meditationes vitae Christi was written by a woman, but she provides only one piece of evidence that is far from conclusive to support the claim (Affective Meditation, 110–15). It is more likely that the author was male."
4. that "as scripted in and through Middle English meditations on the Passion [compassion] is largely a function of gender: to perform compassion is to feel like a woman" (119). Karnes, meanwhile, has stated openly that she is "[u]nconvinced that compassion belongs essentially to women," writing that she "hold[s] that affective meditation in at its foundation neither female- nor lay-oriented."

== The origins and functions of affective piety: revising the consensus ==
Two parts of the standard scholarly paradigm for affective piety have been subject to the most critique: The "Bynum Thesis" and The Myth of Anselmian Origins.

=== Revising the "Bynum Thesis" ===
The "Bynum Thesis" has been subject to pressure, often controversially, on a number of points: essentialism, the idea of a difference between male and female spirituality, the idea that the type of practices described "empowered" women, the use of gender as the sole category of difference, and the very idea of "movements" themselves.

==== Bynum's own reservations concerning the construction of "affective piety" ====
Given how other scholars have used her work to generalize about affective piety, it should be stressed that Caroline Walker Bynum voiced a clear warning in Jesus as Mother, writing:

We must be careful not to overemphasize the affective aspects of later medieval piety. Even in writers, like Marguerite of Oingt, who give the images very concrete development, the notion of Christ as mother, like that of Christ the bridegroom, remains allegorical. Moreover, the humanity of Christ is not as absent in early medieval devotion as many twelfth-century scholars have suggested, following Southern. Piety from the later Middle Ages is not as literal in its use of images or as filled with weeping and ecstasy as scholars since Huizinga have thought.

Moreover, in Wonderful Blood: Theology and Practice in Late Medieval Northern Germany and Beyond, Bynum points out that "interpretations of late medieval spirituality need to disaggregate phenomena often telescoped under terms such as 'affective,' 'devotional,' 'expressionist,' or 'violent.'"

==== Essentialism ====
Kathleen Biddick's article, "Genders, Bodies, Borders: Technologies of the Visible" (1993), brought to the fore concerns over how Holy Feast and Holy Fast essentialized "women" and "experience," reducing women to an "essential, ahistorical maternal." Biddick also wrote that in Bynum's book, "gender carries the more restricted sense of 'woman.'" Bynum discusses this controversy in an autobiographical essay of 2012, where she writes,

The study Holy Feast and Holy Fast, my most influential book, arose almost seamlessly from "Jesus as Mother." Having explored the pressures and opportunities that led certain groups of religious men to use explicitly gendered images for themselves and for the divine, I was curious about whether religious women did so. And I discovered, again to put it a bit simply, that what seemed distinctive about woman-authored texts and male accounts of women was not awareness of gender or complex and self-conscious use of gendered language, but food images and food practices. Although misunderstood by some critics as "essentializing" (this was a nasty charge in the 1990s) or as a glorification of female masochism, it was in fact neither. The argument that women's texts were characterized by specific metaphors and their lives by specific behaviors was not the imposition of modern assumptions about "woman." It was empirical, based on a careful comparison of female-authored texts about the divine, female-authored texts about women, and male-authored texts about women, with texts about men by religious men, such as St. Francis of Assisi or Heinrich Suso, who appeared to be closest in their spirituality to that of women.

David Aers, while deeply respectful of Bynum's work, writes of "Bynum's rather uncritical deployment of the term 'women'" and wonders "whether 'feminizing' the tortured body of Christ as material, for instance, may not actually reinforce some basic premises and fantasies in traditional patriarchal constitutions of 'women.'" In his article "Desire for the Past" (1999), Nicholas Watson discusses the controversy that erupted after the publication of Biddick's article (64 & 67), and subjects Biddick's piece itself to analysis (68–72). He also comments on and critiques Aers' reading of Bynum's work (66–68). In the end, however, Watson agrees that Holy Feast and Holy Fast should be "read with caution" (84). On his view it has "a tendency...to homogenize the devotional practices it considers, presenting a single mode of female spirituality" as well as finding "its closest point of identification in the past not with the feelings of holy women, but in those of the men who described them," thus resulting in "unintended identification with a medieval masculine viewpoint" (77).

==== Differentiation between men's and women's spirituality ====
Amy Hollywood has shown that "when men's and women's religious writings are looked at together, we see that men and women engage in often intense relationships of mutual influence, debate, and appropriation. As a result, any clearly marked distinction between men's and women's spirituality almost immediately breaks down (although the tendency for men to want women's spirituality to take certain forms remains constant at least throughout the Middle Ages and no doubt well into the modern period)." Studies of Meister Eckhart by her and by Bernard McGinn "show a beguine influence" on him "which breaks down both older claims about women's affective spirituality versus men's speculative mysticism as well as Bynum's slightly different thesis." Hollywood also points to Watson's study of Richard Rolle, which "makes similar arguments". For example, Watson writes that Rolle's "images used to describe the four experiences [of the perfectly converted] are derived from all four senses: sight (Sight into Heaven), touch (fervor), smell or taste (dulcor), sound (canor). He also describes the highly emotional, "spiritually sexual", and sensual language of Rolle's early poem Canticum Amoris. Vincent Gillespie's work also undermines the idea that there was a clear distinction between men and women when it came to religious practice, for, he writes, in the fifteenth century, "texts written for the particular circumstances of female religious (which had achieved, somewhat earlier, extension of their audience into ranks of the pious noble and gentlewomen) were being addressed to or compiled for laymen." Nicole R. Rice's book Lay Piety and Religious Discipline in Middle English Literature shows even more amply how books for spiritual guidance and rules for the spiritual life written for female religious could, sometimes with little revision, be popular with the laity, both male and female. On this, see also Jennifer Bryan's Looking Inward: Devotional Reading and the Private Self in Late Medieval England, especially the section on "Women's Reading, Lay Reading".

==== The empowerment thesis ====
David Aers, in particular, has challenged the idea that women were "empowered" by imitation of Christ through self-inflicted suffering or by a "natural" association of women's bodies with food (due to lactation) or with a feminized Christ, whose body nurtured, even nursed, the hungry of spirit and who was imagined as birthing salvation on the cross. He characterizes the "empowerment thesis" as follows: "as the argument goes, as Christ's suffering humanity saved the world so suffering women, subjected by their culture in numerous ways, become the most powerful representatives of the powerless, bleeding, suffering, but salvific Christ" (30). Aers questions whether women's ascetic imitation of the "dominant figuration of Christ's humanity" really "empowered the subordinate" or "subverted the logic and religion of a patriarchal and profoundly mysoginistic [sic] culture" (34).

Alcuin Blamires provides a summary of the empowerment theory and its critique in his book chapter "Beneath the Pulpit":

What women might have gained from cultivating devotions such as these has recently become a contentious matter. According to one school of thought, here lay an empowerment of women, both because the period's cultural description of their bodies was preoccupied with blood and lactation and with nourishing in ways that implied a convergence between women and the salvific life-giving body of Christ (pouring out Eucharistic blood on the cross), and secondly because women were so constituted by their culture as subjected, powerless, suffering beings that they could 'represent' with particular force the suffering humanity of Christ.
According to a contrary school of thought, there lay not empowerment but disempowerment in the late-medieval promotion of affective piety. In this view the women and men who practised it were in effect taking a kind of drug (affective ecstasy, so to speak) which kept them fixated on a particular sentimental construction of the 'humanity' of Christ, and diverted attention from aspects of his ministry which could pose serious problems for the medieval Church. The argument is that alternative, more challenging, and hence institutionally marginalized delineation of what was important in Christ's 'humanity' and ministry remained visible in heterodox contexts, or lurked in otherwise orthodox writing such as Langland's.
In this latter view affective piety was less a 'natural' phenomenon than an instrument of control, one that subtly absorbed the religious energies of women in particular.

For another description of the Aers anti-empowerment thesis see Watson, "Desire for the Past". Watson warns, however, that he is uneasy about how Aers' theory may contrive a "collapse of Bynum's model of female resistance into generalized model of compliance to make space for a picture of Lollard heroism that seems as idealizing as what it replaces" (68).

In the same year that Aers published his arguments, Thomas H. Bestul also sounded a note of caution about identifying "oppositional readings in texts that seem to reproduce the dominant ideology." In his comprehensive study of Latin devotional literature focused on the Passion, he says that it is difficult to really say who might react to any text in a particular way. Furthermore, Bestul points out that

males are the authors of most of the texts dealt with in [his] study. The perspective on women and women's roles formed in the Passion narratives is, it can be argued, a deeply masculine one, even in the many cases where their intended audience is female. That perspective tends to affirm the rightness of the subordinate position of women in medieval society by constructing an image of the Virgin Mary that largely conforms to male expectations of female behavior and male understandings of female personality, psychology, and appropriate demeanor.

He argues that these types of Passion meditations show " a male fascination with a woman tormented, passive, and frequently...literally immobilized by suffering," and he goes as far as to speculate that texts like the Quis dabit lament even function to control "excessive female devotion to Christ's crucified body."

==== Gender as the category of difference ====
Biddick complained that "The model of gender in Holy Feast and Holy Fast assumes that gender is an essence that appears prior to other categories and informs them, that the feminine mirrors, indeed reduces to, the female reproductive function, that the female body is the originary, foundational site of gender." Furthermore (as mentioned above in the "essentialism" section) Biddick observes "Bynum calls this sexual difference 'gender,' but for her gender carries the more restricted sense of "woman," and she argues that a true "historical study of medieval gender interrupts this foundational category of Christianitas by asking how a historical construction of gender in medieval Christendom was simultaneously a construction of other differences." Taking account of these other differences would, for example, include Jews (and the scandal of the Blood Libel), prostitutes, and homosexuals.

Hollywood likewise emphasizes that "gender is not the only—and at times not the most salient—category of difference operative within the Christian Middle Ages or any other society." Hollywood draws attention to scholarship on social class, writing, for example, that "[Sharon] Farmer finds that 'poor men, as well as poor women, were very much associated with the body.' Without denying that "'at various points along the hierarchy of social status' we do find 'that medieval clerical authors ... make statements that drew stronger associations between women and the body than between men and the body,' Farmer convincingly demonstrates that attention to the differences between servants and elites renders easy generalizations about gender difficult."

==== New questions about the concept of "movements" ====
As noted above in the section on "Feminism, Gender, and the Body: The 'Bynum Thesis'", Caroline Walker Bynum's thinking on religious movements and women's roles in them was influenced by Herbert Grundmann's work. Studies of German historiography from the 1930s to the 1950s or 60s have shown how Grundmann's concept of "movements" was shaped by a scholarly climate imbued with Nietzschean ideas about how history should "serve life." In this context, "'life' meant growth and expansion, dynamism, and the kind of creativeness which does not remain fixed in the ideas of the past but painfully transforms itself and gives birth to the new." Study of "great men" like Charlemagne or Frederick II who were considered to have shifted the course of history was the mode. Others wrote history to "glorify man's creative achievements." Grundmann, however, "sought to attribute to groups what [others] attributed to individuals-productive vitality, movement, and the urge to create." In doing so, as Jan Gerchow and Susan Marti have written, Grundmann "seized on" the idea of religious movements as described by Herman Haupt, a Protestant church historian of the previous generation. Haupt, whose scholarship was colored by his Protestantism, regarded the religious movements he described as "movement[s] 'from below' against the 'paternalism' of the official (Catholic) church." Gerchow and Marti also speculate that the idea "was probably enhanced for Grundmann by the National Socialists having seized power through their own "movement" (Bewegung). The German Wikipedia page on Grundmann discusses his affiliation with the National Socialist Party.

Some German scholars have suggested that the concept of "religious women's movement" should be avoided "at least insofar as it is not clearly distinguished and differentiated from women's movements in modernity, whether the popular evangelical movement against the official church or nationalistic movements of any kind." Yet, Gerchow and Marti write, "Complete avoidance of the term...can hardly be expected, as a certain tendentious militancy has been a part of the concept of a "women's movement" from the very beginning."

=== Revising the myth of Anselmian origins: questioning the timeline ===
It has been long known that Anselm's Prayers and Meditations were preceded by a generation in the writings of another Norman monk and abbot, John of Fécamp. And in 1972, Douglas Gray ventured to write in an endnote that

It is hard to believe that (as is sometimes implied) "affective" devotion suddenly "began" in the late eleventh century. It is much more likely that fervent and personal devotion to Christ was an aspect of Christian spirituality which was present from the beginning... even if it was not given such emphatic (or exaggerated) expression as in the Middle Ages.... Probably this strain of personal devotion was taken up and given memorable literary form by powerful intellects like Anselm and Bernard, and with the weight of their authority as leaders and spokesmen of the ascetic and eremitic revival became the accepted and expected form of expression.

Michael G. Sargent has written likewise of how affective devotional practices have a long history in the reading and meditative practices (the lectio divina) of Western Monasticism, and Nicholas Watson has described the standard narrative as it relates to Middle English mystical literature as "perhaps suspiciously straightforward".

==== Fulton and Saxon Devotion to Christ ====
Rachel Fulton's book, From Judgment to Passion: Devotion to Christ and the Virgin Mary, 800–1200, addresses the question of

how to understand not only how but why this [imaginative, empathetic] devotion to Christ came into being both when and where it did, along with its corollary devotions to the Eucharist and to Mary; how to understand, in other words, both the making and the meaning of this new thing—if, in fact, it was a new thing and not simply a becoming visible of something already there (as Southern suggested it might be).

When Fulton explains the high medieval origins of "devotion to Christ in his suffering, historical humanity and to his mother in her compassion" she does not dispute the Southern Thesis. Rather, she writes, "at no point in the current scholarly discussion is it, in fact, made clear what the historical catalysts may have been for this 'surge of pious devotion,' only the prevailing conditions for that change (monastic tradition, growth of towns, reform of the Church, the status of the laity or of women), some of which themselves were contingent upon that change (new liturgical practices, new artistic representations of Christ and his mother, new theological arguments, the Crusades)(61)." Fulton's thesis is that the catalyst was the passing of the millennium and the year 1033 (1000 years after the death of Jesus) without the Second Coming of Christ (63–64). Her book studies the effects of this

on the life and thought of some of the most prominent (and influential) reformers and intellectuals of the century: Peter Damian (circa 1007–1072), Berengar of Tours (circa 1000–1088), Lanfranc of Bec (circa 1005–1089), John of Fécamp (abbot, 1028–1078), and Anselm of Canterbury (1033–1109). As we shall see, the emphasis they placed on, for example, the celibacy of the clergy or the action effected in the sacrament, was itself intricately bound up with their expectations of judgment. To understand the development of the devotion to Christ in his suffering humanity of which these reforms were a part, we must first understand what was at stake in that devotion: the placation—and repayment—of the all-powerful, all-seeing crucified Judge. (64)

In the words of one reviewer, "millennial disappointment in the early mid-eleventh century unleashed a flood of religious, theological, and liturgical responses that helped to shape patterns of devotional response."

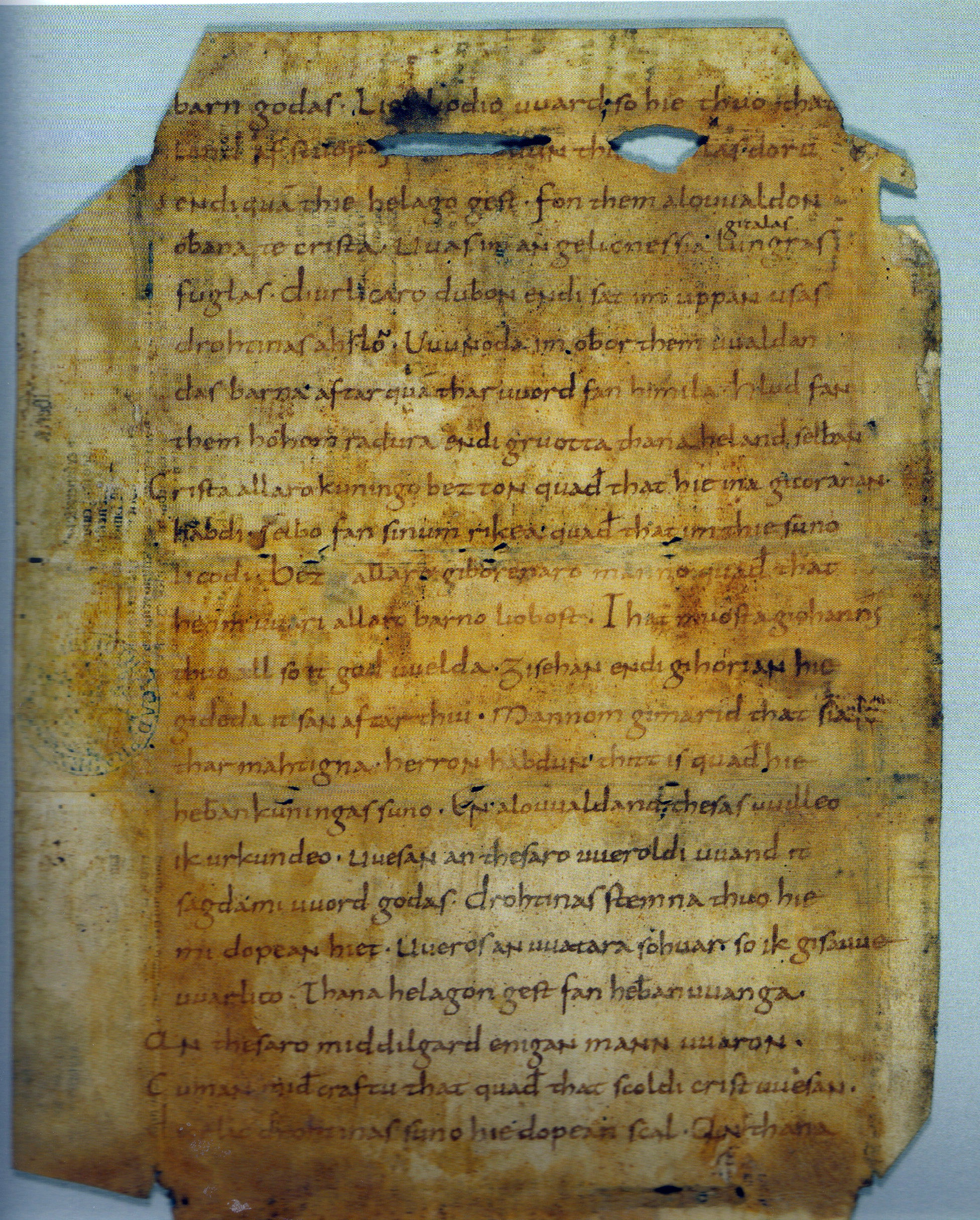
Heliand-Fragment P [German Historical Museum, Berlin]

The place where Fulton's findings do put real pressure on the Southern Thesis is in her opening chapter, "History, Conversion, and the Saxon Christ". In it, Fulton makes a case for how new doctrines of the Real Presence in the Eucharist and new and affectively charged retellings of Bible stories were intrinsic to the ninth century conversion of the Saxons. She focuses in on the Old Saxon historical epic poem, the Heliand ("Savior"). Written "in the alliterative verse traditionally used for vernacular heroic epics," it uses secular oral formulas (Christ is a "mead-giver" [medomgebon] and the apostles gisiði ["warrior-companions, retainers"], etc.) These cultural and linguistic translations serve to make the story "experientially viable" for the Saxon audience (30). The story, however, needed to be not "only comprehensible, but urgent", something in which the audience "is now compelled to recognize itself" (41). But on Fulton's reading, Christ, across the range of Saxon and Anglo-Saxon translations,

was not a Christ for whom sinners were expected themselves to have compassion; this was a Christ in whose presence they could do nothing but pray. Moreover—as Paschasius himself suggested in his emphasis on the reality of Christ's presence at the altar and of the judgment effected in eating unworthily of his flesh—the more imminent the moment of judgment, the more impassioned must their prayers become. (59)

Implicit here, but not fully articulated, is the suggestion that there was a type of affective devotion and an effort to craft or shock an emotional response, but that the emotions were different than those that would be evoked in later affective devotional practice.

==== Anglo-Saxon affective devotion ====
Likewise in support of pushing the timeline back is the fact that over the years there have been a number or articles on Anglo-Saxon literature that show how many of the features of later medieval affective piety are also found in Anglo-Saxon religious texts.

In 1977, Thomas H. Bestul pointed out that "there is a significant body of private devotional prayers written in England from about 950 to the end of the eleventh century which anticipates, and occasionally shares in, Anselm's innovations." These prayers "share a similar emotionalism in style and a new subjectivity in treating the common penitential themes," Bestul wrote. Bestul has written similarly of continuities between Anselmian prayer and the Irish Tradition. In 1980, John C. Shields published an article on "The Seafarer as a Meditatio". Although previous scholars had long thought that The Seafarer is a "religious lyric" or an "elegy" (both being genres that rely on emotional expression), Shields argued that the poem "may profitably be understood as a meditatio, that is, a literary spiritual exercise whose author aspires to the perfection of the soul." In the same year, Christopher L. Chase published on "'Christ III,' 'The Dream of the Rood,' and Early Christian Passion Piety". Ann Savage pushed this thesis further in 1987 and explicitly aligned poems such as The Wanderer, The Seafarer, and The Dream of the Rood with later affective devotional practice. Christina M. Heckman has written of the imitatio and identification with the Rood (the cross) in The Dream of the Rood along the same lines.

Allen J. Frantzen's article, "Spirituality and Devotion in the Anglo-Saxon Penitentials" (2005), openly questions a tradition of scholarship that has all but ignored Anglo-Saxon religious texts and practices, and he broadens the view out from lyric and elegiac vernacular poetry to include Penitentials, or handbooks listing sins, penances, and prayers. The Penitentials, he points out, emphasize weeping, guilt, and mercy, and

The penitent is the subject rather than the object of this discourse. Contrition is not something that happens to the penitent but is rather an affect he or she creates, as the focus on humility and on the weeping voice suggests. Affectivity is the translation of idea into expressive gesture, and this moment is surely an affective one. If the genuineness of a late-medieval spiritual experience is confirmed by its external signs—by its affectivity, in other words—we should extend the same criterion to the early evidence, where we find that it works just as well.

Even the "lists or catalogues [of sins]", Frantzen writes, "would have situated the penitent physically and psychologically at the center of a reflective, meditative, and indeed affective process" (125).

Scott DeGregorio engages in similar polemic in "Affective Spirituality: Theory and Practice in Bede and Alfred the Great". In it, he aims "to highlight some of the ways these writers anticipate the currents of thought and practice commonly said to mark later medieval devotional literature, and to argue thereby for a more integrated approach to the study of medieval English spirituality." DeGregorio says of Bede's commentary on the Song of Songs that its

language, and more so the range of emotional experiences it seeks to trigger in the individual believer, should be all too familiar to scholars of later medieval devotion, who, bypassing Anglo-Saxon England, rush to make the eleventh and twelfth centuries the terminus post quem for the emergence of affective elements in western devotional literature. (131)

Furthermore, DeGregorio writes, "a good three centuries before Anselm, Bede saw in Christ's crucified body the ultimate "text" upon which such devotional practice [i.e., meditative reading] should be focused" (132). He goes on to argue that not only does Asser's Life of King Alfred describe how Alfred used a private prayerbook for private prayer and meditation, but that Alfred's own writings show that he understood that "Reading...is about the construction—or rather the transformation—of the individual, a process of internalizing what has been read, of making it one's own, such as happens in meditative or spirituality [sic] forms of reading" (135). Alfred was, DeGregorio sums up, after "a lnd of reading experience that would move him, as an individual, to deeper forms of piety and self-knowledge" (135).

Increased attention to the forms of affective devotional content in pre-Conquest English literature appears in Jennifer A. Lorden's work. In Forms of Devotion in Early English Poetry, Lorden argues that the combination of devotional forms with vernacular poetic topoi and type scenes created a hybrid aesthetic evoking the affective associations those forms had accrued in other contexts.

==== The Byzantine and late antique evidence ====
In 1988, Sandro Sticca connected the development of conceptions of the Virgin Mary's compassion for her son's sufferings to Byzantine traditions, something that Jaroslav Pelikan also argued in 1996. And in From Judgment to Passion, Rachel Fulton also indicated Byzantine antecedents to Marian devotion.

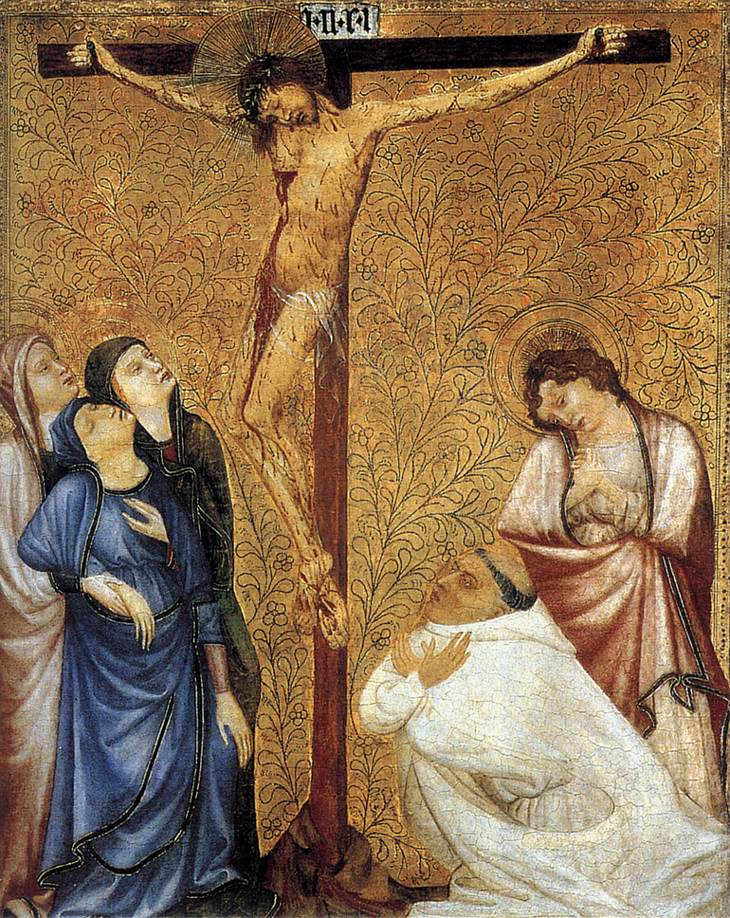
Jean de Beaumetz. Christ on the Cross with a Praying Carthusian Monk. (c. 1335) [Museum of Art, Cleveland] "The picture is one of the 26 panels that once adorned the cells of the Carthusian monastery at Champmol near Dijon."

These indications were followed upon in Stephen J. Shoemaker's article on Maximus the Confessor's seventh-century Life of the Virgin. Shoemaker argues that the text offers

a prolonged reflection on Mary's role in the events of the crucifixion that relates her boundless grief and envisions her participation in the suffering of her son. Accordingly this text raises significant questions about the development of 'affective' modes of piety and the concept of Marian compassion, both of which are closely linked with meditations on Mary's presence at the cross in the later Christian tradition. In particular, this new evidence invites us to rethink certain explanations of these phenomena that would link their genesis to the end of iconoclasm in the East (the ninth century) and the beginnings of the High Middle Ages in the West (the eleventh century). In the case of the Christian East, the importance of this early Life of the Virgin for understanding the emergence of new styles of Marian devotion is unmistakably clear. Yet its potential influence on similar developments in the Christian West is somewhat less certain and difficult to ascertain. Nevertheless, even if it may ultimately prove impossible to connect all of the dots between this late ancient text and the piety of the Western High Middle Ages, it seems increasingly clear that we have to reckon with the initial emergence of Marian lament and compassion and affective devotion in rather different historical circumstances than have traditionally been envisaged.

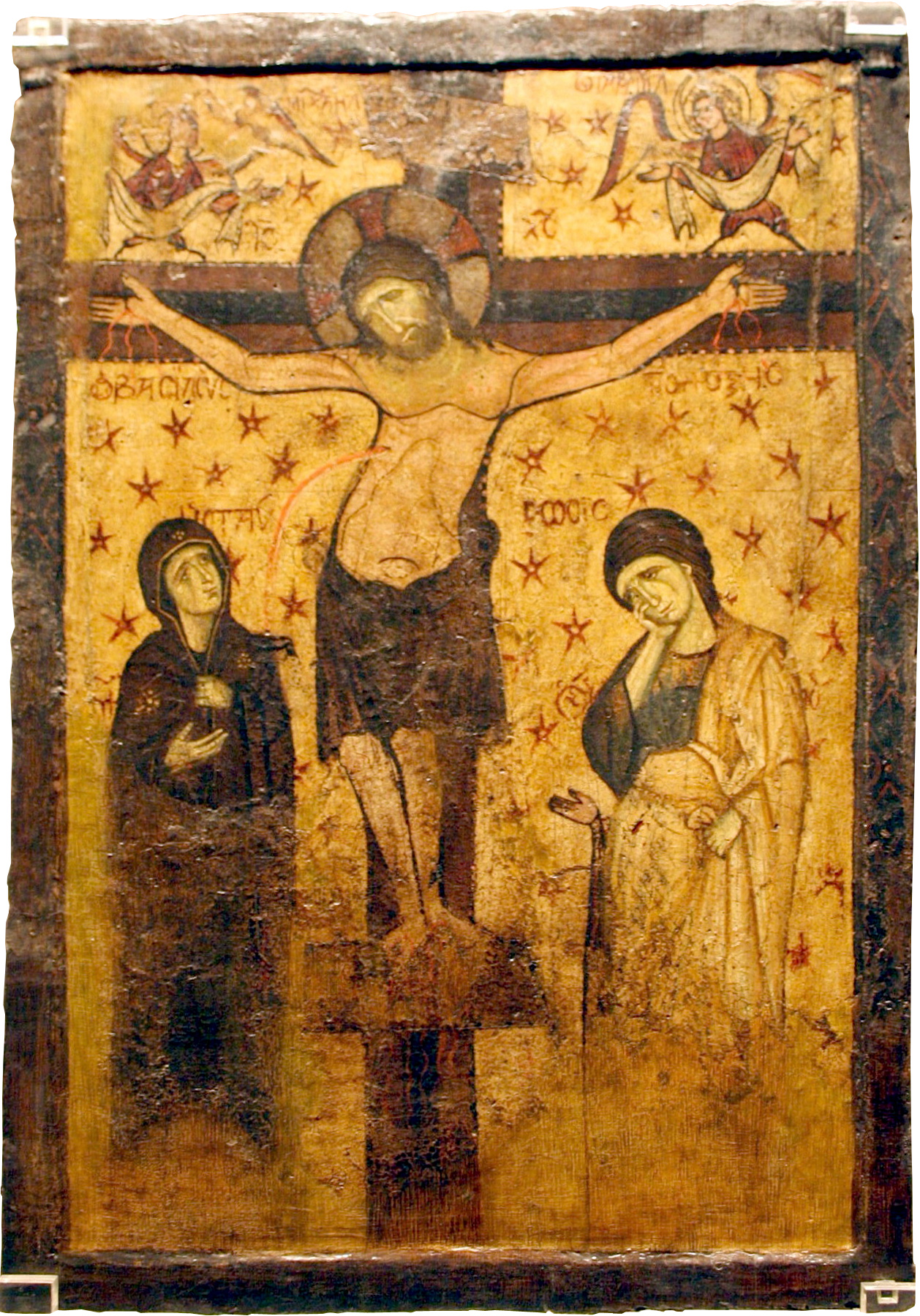
Double-sided icon with the Crucifixion and the Virgin Hodegitria (9th Century with additions and overpainting of the 10th and 13th centuries) The Byzantine and Christian Museum, Athens.

Shoemaker advances the hypothesis that Western monks could have learned affective devotion to the Virgin Mary from the significant interactions between Western and Byzantine monastic communities, not to mention the interest of reform movements in Eastern ascetic practices. For example, before he became abbot of Fécamp, William of Volpiano had been a reforming abbot at St. Benignus in Dijon, where "he received a Greek bishop, Barnabas, into the community, and there were several other Greek monks"; and John of Fécamp received his monastic formation under his uncle at St. Begninus ("Mary at the Cross" 598). In the end, though "we cannot be certain that the affective piety and Marian compassion of the High Middle Ages were Eastern imports, we nonetheless must begin to reckon with fact that the emergence of these themes in the eleventh and twelfth centuries was not quite as unprecedented as some have assumed" (Shoemaker, "Mary at the Cross" 606).

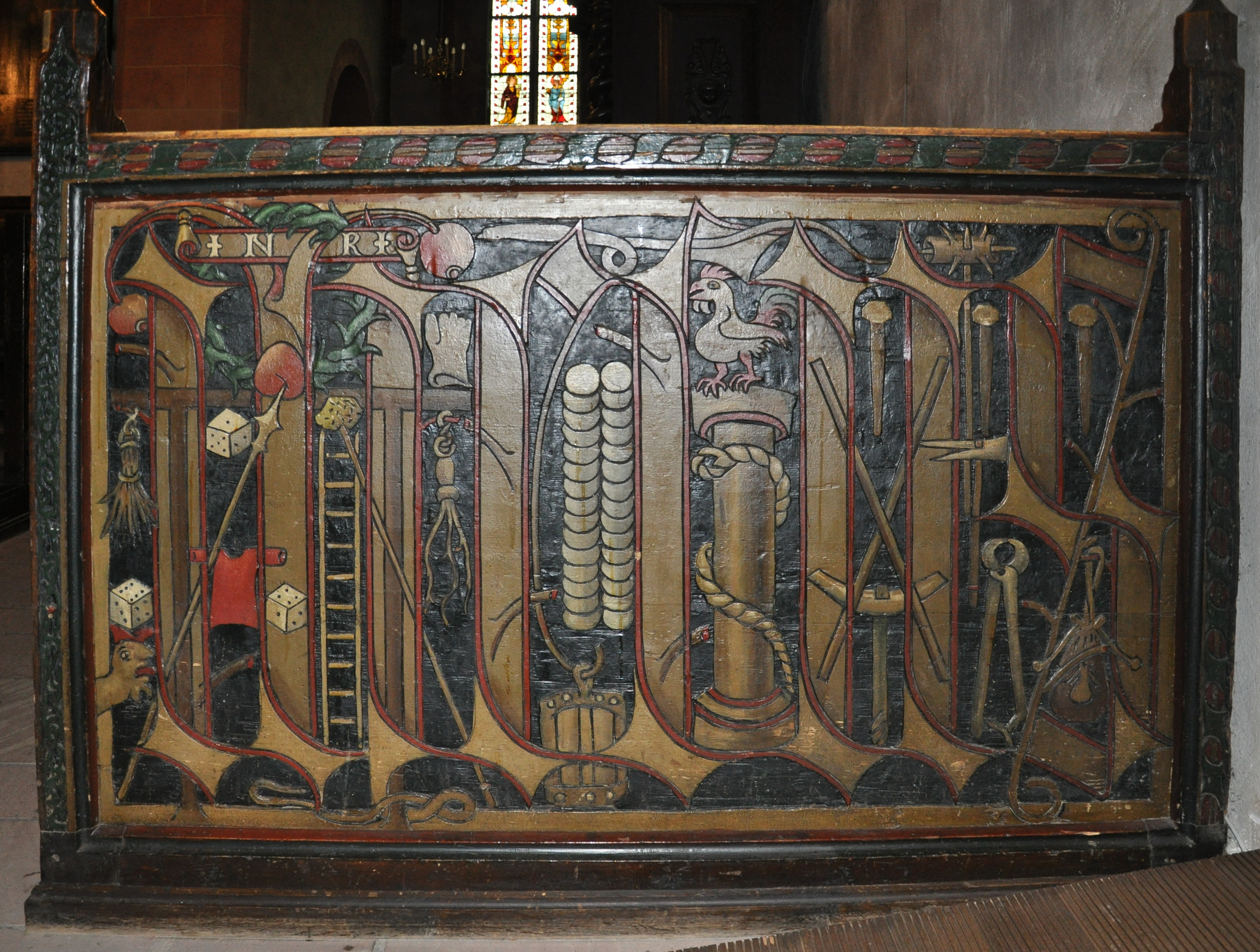
Arma Christi on Pew Back, Church of St. Valentine (completed in 1493), Kiedrich, Germany

In an article on the Late Antique and Patristic antecedents to Arma Christi imagery, Mary Agnes Edsall has demonstrated that visual images of the Arma have antecedents in the rhetoric of Late Antique sermons. Bishops, especially during Lent and Easter Week, would preach on the Passion and would use the resources of their training in rhetoric to craft ekphrases (vivid word-pictures) of the Passion and Crucifixion. In the late-first/early-second century AD, Plutarch described ekphrasis when he wrote of Thucydides' skill as an author:

Thucydides is always striving for this vivdness (enargeia) in his writing, as he eagerly desires to make the listener a spectator, as it were, and to produce in the minds of his readers the feelings of astonishment and consternation which were experienced by those who witnessed the events.

One figure of speech good for creating "vividness" was asyndeton: "the omission of conjunctions between clauses, often resulting in a hurried rhythm or vehement effect."

Edsall argues that these kinds of ekphrases "were ways of knowing, as if having been present at, the suffering and death of Jesus.... their compressed form sharpens the depiction of pain and suffering into an effective instrument of compunction: the piercing realization of personal sin and fear of Hell, or of the grace of Salvation, or even both."

== New directions: rhetorical antecedents, philosophical underpinnings, and history of the emotions ==
=== Images, the emotions, and knowing: philosophy and theories of rhetoric ===
==== Mary Carruthers ====
Mary Carruthers' trio of books, The Book of Memory: A Study of Memory in Medieval Culture (1990), The Craft of Thought: Meditation, Rhetoric, and the Making of Images (1998), and The Experience of Beauty in the Middle Ages (2013), have driven home the complexity of the blend of theories (medieval and ancient) that described the functions of vision and the emotions in knowledge—in other words, "sense-derived understanding". The following section will summarize those parts of her scholarship that have particular relevance for understanding affective devotional texts and art.

The Book of Memory (among many other topics) describes Aristotle's theory of how "emotions and even judgements are in some sense physiological processes, although they are more than just that. Memory images produced in the emotional (sensitive) part of the soul, are 'physiological affections (meaning both "a change" and "a disposition to change in a certain way).'" "Our senses produce 'affects' in us," she writes, "physical changes such as emotions, and one of those 'affects' is memory itself....Our memories store 'likenesses' of things as they were when they appeared to and affected us. This analysis...requires that all memory-images have an emotional component, acquired during the process of their formation."

The Craft of Thought, focused in on the use (or "craft") of meditative images, and in this book Carruthers added to the mix the concept of ductus, defined in a later essay as "the way (s) that a composition, realizing the plan(s) set within its arrangements, guides a person to its various goals, both in its parts and overall." While on one hand ductus applied to the direction and goal of a whole work, there were places or stages along the way (like the places and images that organized the memory of a speech or a complex idea); and "What marks out the variation in route(s) of the overall ductus are figures, modes and colors of the journey." These terms overlap in meaning, having to do with "ornaments of rhetoric". These not only introduce variety and interest, they are also related to presentation, emotion, and persuasion. Carruthers writes,

Cicero describes how a successful orator uses ornament abundantly but carefully, each word chosen well. Especially often he should use metaphors "because such figures by virtue of the comparisons [they make] transport our thoughts (animos [also the feelings, affections, or passions]), then bring them back, and move them about here and there, and this rapidly changing movement of thought (cogitationes) in itself pleases" (Orator, 134).

A ductus would, hopefully, move people, intellectually and emotionally, through the places of a text to its end, or its intention (intentio) to persuade them one way or another.

In The Experience of Beauty in the Middle Ages, Carruthers deepens the analysis of intentio that was also part of the other two books, and lays out three ways that the term is used. These are the interrelated intentiones of the writer/speaker, of the text/speech, and of the reader/auditor. Carruthers summarizes:

Intention is primarily a matter of movement, and the initial artisan's intentions (as a set of chosen movements) are conveyed within his artifact through its planned ductus. One experiencing the work does so through and among the various elements of its ductus, namely its formal and stylistic choices or intentiones. That experience is led (ductus) in the first instance not by moral ideas but by pleasure and delight, the desires (which Augustine called intentiones) of the perceiver responding to the "intentions" (movements) of the style imparted to it by the "intentions" (choices) of the artist.

To employ Carruthers' insights, an affective meditation, prayer, or piece of art is intended by the author, artist, or compositor to persuade those who read, hear, or behold it by means of the "formal and stylistic choices" he or she makes. The affective meditation, prayer, or piece of art transmits the intentions inscribed within it—in a way it has these intentions. The perceiver's intentiones (his or her set of desires shaped by individual memory and social/psychological disposition) respond to the design of the ductus, leading to the perceiver's feeling, knowing, and believing what the text, speech, or piece of art intends.

==== Michelle Karnes ====
Michelle Karnes' book Imagination, Meditation, and Cognition in the Middle Ages (2011) addresses the "cognitive work that medieval imagination performs, both in Aristotelian philosophy and in meditations on Christ." She writes that

Creating vivid mental images of Christ's sacrifice of himself for humankind heightens affection for him ... I argue that gospel meditations have another, cognitive purpose that becomes visible only when we study the meditations' references to "imagination" in concert with medieval philosophical thought about imagination.

In other words, "such meditations have a theoretical basis...One that will allow us to "better understand why imagining Christ's life was considered an especially useful thing to do."

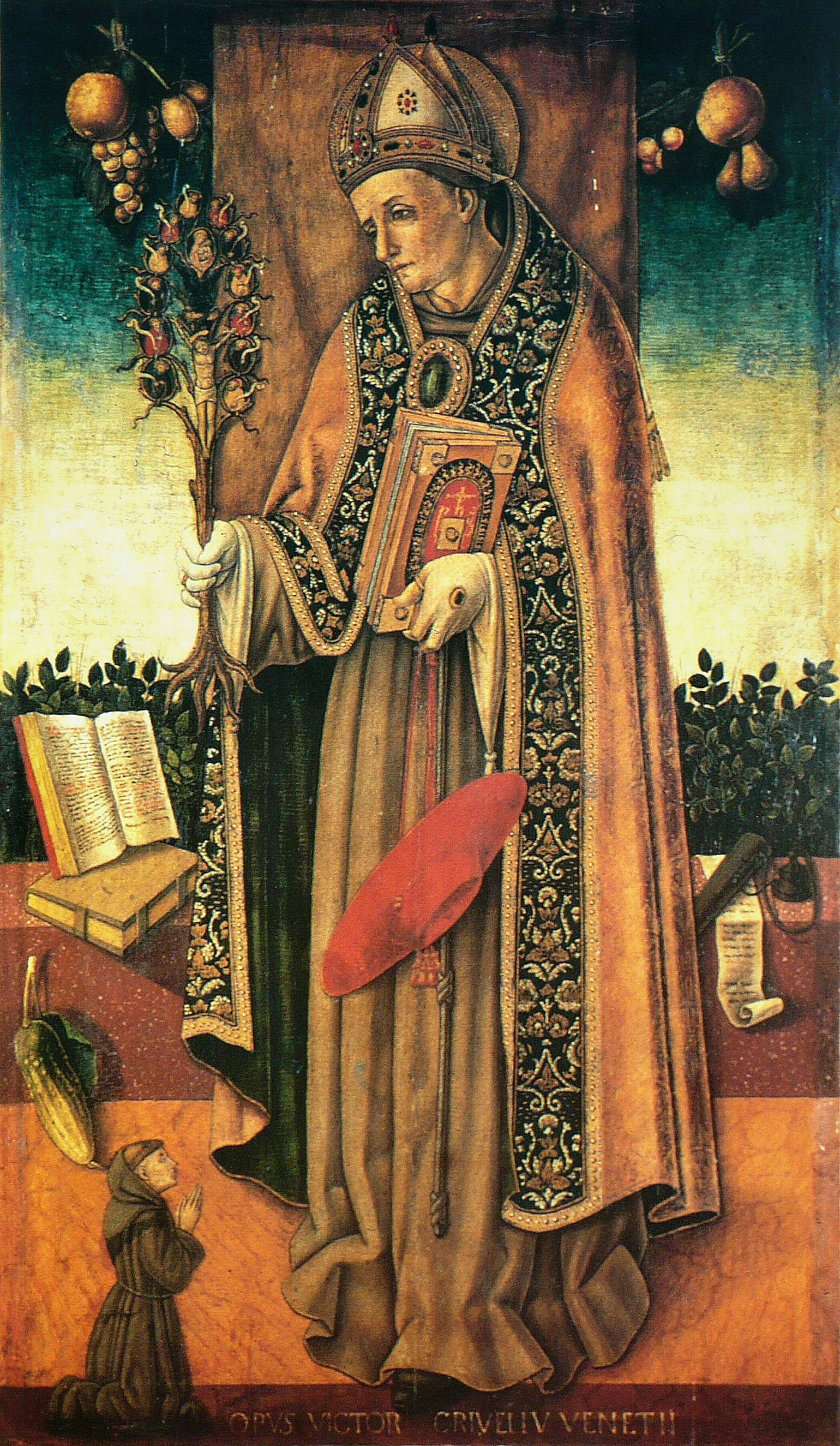
Vittorio Crivelli (1450–1502), Saint Bonaventure Holding the Tree of Life (Musée Jacquemart-André, Paris). The Tree of Life (or Lignum vitae) was Bonaventure's most popular meditation on Christ.

Bonaventure is a key figure in this study. "The particular power of medieval imagination that Bonaventure identified," Karnes writes, "arose not from the simple importing of Aristotelian philosophy into the Latin West but from its application to Augustinian theology." Bonaventure, in "[r]elying on a newly powerful faculty of imagination...made more powerful the act of imagining the life of Christ, both in his own meditations and, through their influence, in many of those that followed."
The "Aristotelian imagination", as Karnes calls it, "connects the senses to the intellect, providing a certain mechanism for knowledge experience" (35). In one reviewer's summary, "Imagination is the bridge between the senses and the intellect, a key link between the apprehension of sense data and the comprehension of it through a process of gradual abstraction, refinement and intellectual generalization, a movement from particular observations and the experience of specific sensations to universalizing knowledge, from sensibilia to intelligibilia. The devotional imagination as described by Bonaventure would likewise be a mediator, but "between earthly meditation on Christ's humanity and spiritual contemplation of his divinity," and it could do so "because it utilized the considerable cognitive and spiritual potential of imagination"(61).
As Karnes puts it,

in Bonaventure's gospel meditations, imagination harnesses its cognitive power to enable the meditant to conform to Christ in both his natures. The work of meditation is therefore cognitive, as well as affective. Imagination helps the meditant to imagine scenes vividly and feel appropriate emotion, but it also uses the light that shines on it when engaged in the act of knowing in order to lift the meditant to Christ. Bonaventure wants the meditant to love Christ, but also to know him. (112)

Rather than inventing gospel meditations or this way of thinking about their aims, Bonaventure provided them with theoretical underpinnings and a method, or "mechanism", for making the journey to God (112–113). They became a means of contemplative, even mystical, ascent in ways that they had not been before (119–120). For example, in Bonaventure's own meditative texts, such as the Tree of Life (or Lignum vitae), "ascent to God in heaven proceeds through the mind and through Christ crucified" (130). In it, "It is imagination that affords the meditant special presence within gospel scenes and provides the mechanism of the meditant's ascent" (131). In Bonaventure's words in the Vitis mystica (as quoted by Karnes),

"Let us be bound with the bonds of the passion of the good and most loving Jesus, so that we may also share with Him the bonds of love. For, made fast by these latter, He was drawn down from heaven to earth in order to suffer the former. Conversely, we who desire to be drawn from earth into heaven must bind ourselves to the Head with the bonds of the passion, through which we will attain the bonds of love and thus become one with him. (135–136)

Karnes reveals, in the end, the deeply intellectual, philosophical influences on a range of later medieval meditative texts, among other things calling into question the common characterization of meditation on the life of Christ as a genre for the unlettered and the layperson.

=== History of the emotions and rethinking affective piety ===
==== Sarah McNamer ====
Sarah McNamer's book Affective Meditation and the Invention of Medieval Compassion focuses on affective meditations on the Passion as "richly emotional, script-like texts that ask their readers to imagine themselves present at scenes of Christ's suffering and to perform compassion for that suffering victim in a private drama of the heart." It breaks ground in using "the history of emotion as an additional framework" and presents:

a new reading of medieval Christian compassion as a historically contingent, ideologically charged, and performatively constituted emotion—and one that was in the broad period considered...(ca. 1050–1530) one that was insistently gendered as feminine....to perform compassion—in the private drama of the heart that these texts stage—is to feel like a woman, in particular medieval iterations of that identity.

Whether scholars agree or not with the idea that, over time and place, cultures have "forg[ed] and nourish[ed]" links between women and compassion or with the idea that affective piety was primarily associated with the feminine and femininity, McNamer's book offers a new methodology for understanding what affective devotional practices sought to foster in their users: they were "mechanisms for the production of feeling". Building on work by Barbara Rosenwein and William Reddy, she argues that affective prayers and meditations "are, quite literally, scripts for the performance of feeling—scripts that often explicitly aspire to performative efficacy." McNamer writes that these scripts are much like William M. Reddy's category of "Emotives". In the passage from Reddy as quoted by McNamer, emotives are "'first person, present tense emotion claims' that potentially, but not always, function as performatives; they are 'similar to performatives (and differ from constatives) in that emotives do things to the world. Emotives are themselves instruments for directly changing, building, hiding, intensifying emotions, instruments that may be more or less successful.'"
