= Porlock =

Village in Somerset, England

Coordinates: 51.208796°N 3.595557°W

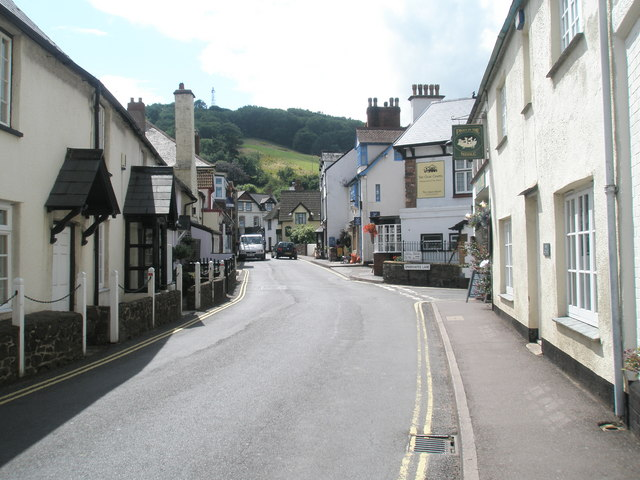
- High Street

- Location within Somerset
- Population: 1,440 (2011)
- OS grid reference: SS886467
- Unitary authority: Somerset Council
- Ceremonial county: Somerset
- Region: South West
- Country: England
- Sovereign state: United Kingdom
- Post town: MINEHEAD
- Postcode district: TA24
- Dialling code: 01643
- Police: Avon and Somerset
- Fire: Devon and Somerset
- Ambulance: South Western
- UK Parliament: Tiverton and Minehead
- Website: Website

Porlock is a coastal village in Somerset, England, 5 miles (8 km) west of Minehead. At the 2011 census, the village had a population of 1,440.

In 2017, Porlock had the highest percentage of elderly population in England, with over 40% being of pensionable age as of 2010.

== History ==
East of the village is Bury Castle, an Iron Age hill fort.

There is evidence for 10th or 11th century origin for the name Porlock as Portloc or Portloca meaning enclosure by the harbour, from the Old English port and loca, and in Domesday Book the village was known as "Portloc". In 914 the Vikings plundered Porlock.

Porlock was part of the hundred of Carhampton.

The area has links with several Romantic poets and R. D. Blackmore, the author of Lorna Doone, and is popular with visitors. The visitor centre has exhibits and displays about the area. Also on display are the bones of an aurochs, discovered on Porlock beach in 1999.

== Governance ==
The parish council has responsibility for local issues, including setting an annual precept (local rate) to cover the council's operating costs and producing annual accounts for public scrutiny. The parish council evaluates local planning applications and works with the local police, district council officers, and neighbourhood watch groups on matters of crime, security, and traffic. The parish council's role also includes initiating projects for the maintenance and repair of parish facilities, as well as consulting with the district council on the maintenance, repair, and improvement of highways, drainage, footpaths, public transport, and street cleaning. Conservation matters (including trees and listed buildings) and environmental issues are also the responsibility of the council.

For local government purposes since 1 April 2023 the parish has come under the unitary authority of Somerset Council. Prior to this it was part of the non-metropolitan district of Somerset West and Taunton (formed on 1 April 2019) and, before this, the district of West Somerset (established under the Local Government Act 1972). It was part of Williton Rural District before 1974.

As Porlock falls within the Exmoor National Park some functions normally administered by district or county councils have, since 1997, fallen under the Exmoor National Park Authority, which is known as a 'single purpose' authority, the aims of which are to "conserve and enhance the natural beauty, wildlife and cultural heritage of the National Parks" and "promote opportunities for the understanding and enjoyment of the special qualities of the Parks by the public", including responsibility for the conservation of the historic environment.

Porlock has an electoral ward called 'Porlock and District' which stretches westwards to the Devon boundary, eastwards to Minehead and south to Wootton Courtenay. The total population of the ward at the 2011 census was 2,338.

It is also part of the Tiverton and Minehead county constituency represented in the House of Commons of the Parliament of the United Kingdom. It elects one Member of Parliament (MP) by the first past the post system of election. Prior to Brexit in 2020 it was part of the South West England constituency of the European Parliament.

== Geography ==
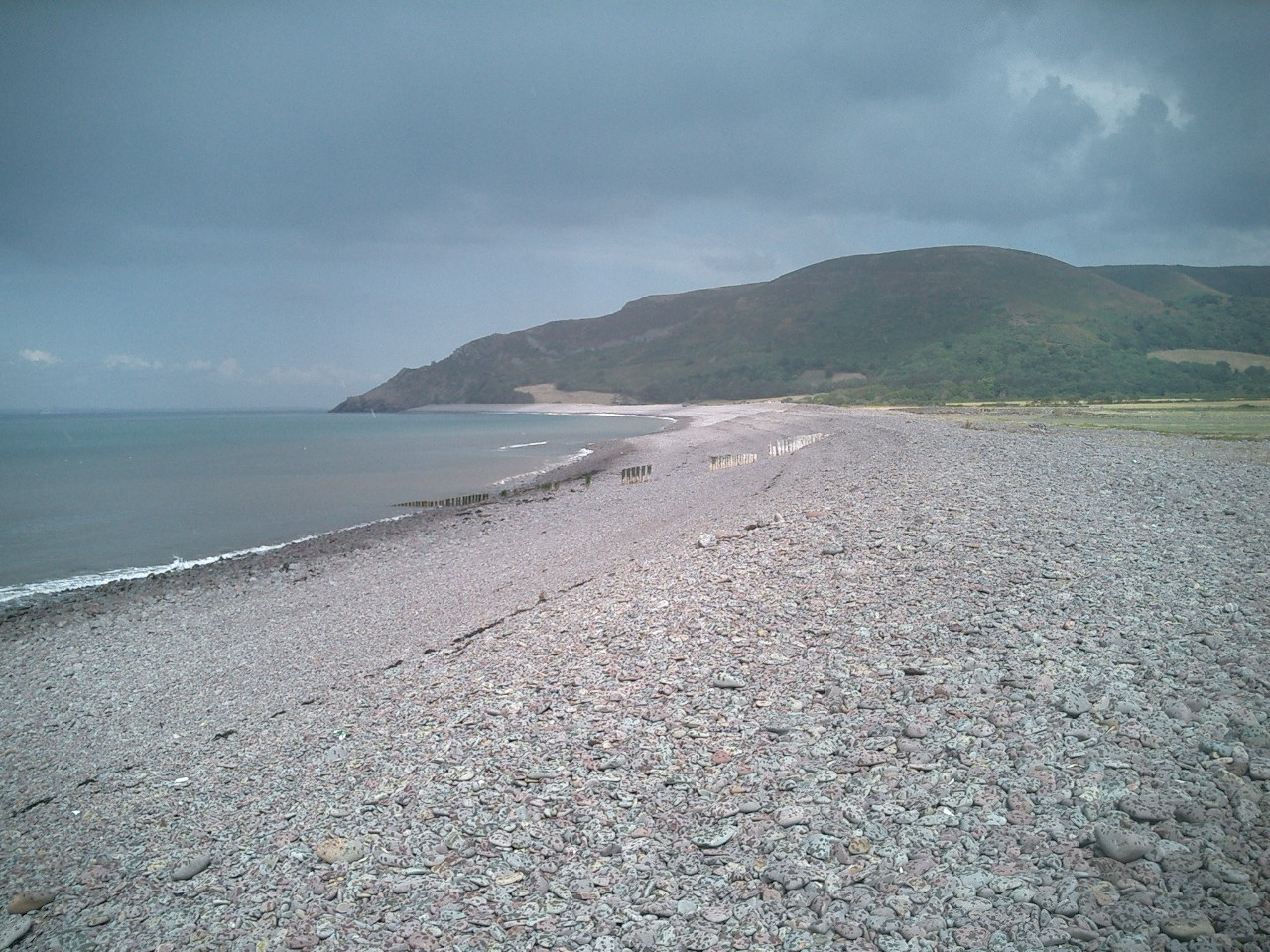
Porlock beach

The village adjoins the Porlock Ridge and Saltmarsh nature reserve, created from the lowland behind a high shingle embankment which was breached by the sea in 1996, which has now been designated as a Site of Special Scientific Interest. Copses of white dead trees remind the visitor of when this was freshwater pasture.

A stream flows down a wooded combe called Hawkcombe, which leads about 3 miles (4.8 km) from the village up to high open moorland. The stream, Hawkcombe Waters, runs past a Victorian hunting lodge called The Cleeve, then underground beneath the Overstream Hotel in the centre of the village.

The South West Coast Path goes through Porlock, many walkers stopping rather than continuing the long walk to Lynton. There is also a 'Coleridge Way' walk.

Culbone Church is said to be the smallest church in England. The main structure is 12th century. Services are still held there, despite the lack of road access – Culbone is a 2-mile (3.2 km) walk from Porlock Weir, and some 3–4 miles (5–6 km) from Porlock itself.

A toll road bypasses the 1 in 4 gradient on Porlock Hill. There is the prehistoric Porlock Stone Circle on the hill.

=== Submerged forest ===
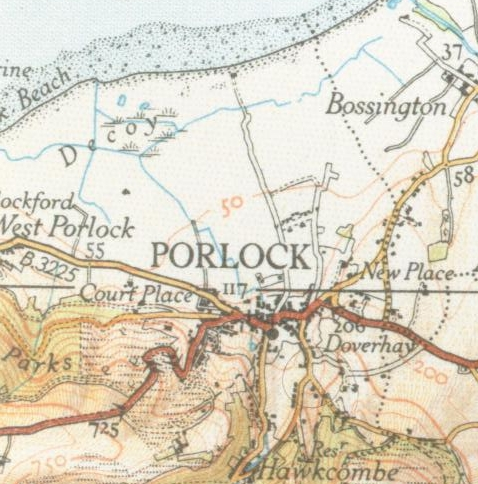
A map of Porlock from 1937

At low tide the remains of a submerged forest can be seen on Porlock Beach. The area was several miles inland until the sea level in the Bristol Channel rose about 7000 to 8000 years ago.

== Church ==
The Church of St Dubricius dates from the 13th century. The spire was damaged in a storm of 1703. The church has been designated as a grade I listed building. Within the church is a 15th-century tomb of John Harrington who fought alongside Henry V in France in 1417.

== Cultural references ==
=== "Person on business from Porlock" ===
In 1797, poet Samuel Taylor Coleridge, who lived nearby at Nether Stowey (between Bridgwater and Minehead), but — due to illness — had "retired to a lonely farm house between Porlock and Lynton", was interrupted during composition of his poem Kubla Khan by "a person on business from Porlock", and claimed he found afterwards he could not remember what had come to him in a dream.

Coleridge and William Wordsworth (who lived nearby at Alfoxden) would often roam the hills and coast on long night walks, leading to local gossip that they were 'spies' for the French. The Government sent an agent to investigate, but found they were "mere poets". Their walks are celebrated by the Coleridge Way which ends in Porlock. Their friend Robert Southey published a poem titled "Porlock" in 1798.

== Notable people ==
- Michael McMaster (1896–1965), cricketer and Royal Naval Air Service officer

== Bibliography ==
- Hook, Rev. Walter, The History of the Ancient Church of Porlock and of the Patron Saint St Dubricius and his Times. (The author was rector of Porlock)
- Halliday, Mrs. M. The Porlock Monuments. (The author lived at Glenthorne, Porlock)
- Chadwyck Healey, C. The Ports of West Somerset.
- Grimble, Ian. The Harington Family.
