= List of scheduled monuments in West Somerset (H–Z) =

West Somerset shown within Somerset and England

West Somerset was a local government district in the English county of Somerset. It merged with Taunton Deane to form Somerset West and Taunton on 1 April 2019. The council covered a largely rural area, with a population of 35,075 in an area of 740 square kilometres (290 sq mi). According to figures released by the Office for National Statistics in 2009, the population of West Somerset had the oldest average age in the United Kingdom at 52. The largest centres of population were the coastal towns of Minehead (population 10,000) and Watchet (4,400).

A scheduled monument is a nationally important archaeological site or monument which is given legal protection by being placed on a list (or "schedule") by the Secretary of State for Culture, Media and Sport; English Heritage takes the leading role in identifying such sites. The legislation governing this is the Ancient Monuments and Archaeological Areas Act 1979. The term "monument" can apply to the whole range of archaeological sites, and they are not always visible above ground. Such sites have to have been deliberately constructed by human activity. They range from prehistoric standing stones and burial sites, through Roman remains and medieval structures such as castles and monasteries, to later structures such as industrial sites and buildings constructed for the World Wars or the Cold War.

There are 201 (Note: Wood Barrow round barrow is included twice in the National Heritage List for England as it straddles the border between Somerset and Devon.) scheduled monuments in West Somerset. Some of the oldest, particularly on Exmoor and the Quantock Hills are Neolithic, Bronze Age or Iron Age including hillforts, cairns, bowl barrows and other tumulis. More recent sites include several motte-and-bailey castles and church or village crosses which date from the Middle Ages. The geography with large numbers of streams is reflected by the number of packhorse and other bridges included in the list. The mining history of the area is also represented by several sections of the West Somerset Mineral Railway and associated ruins of mine buildings which are now scheduled. The most recent monuments are World War II pillboxes. The monuments are listed below using the titles given in the English Heritage data sheets.

== Monuments ==
Name	Location	Type	Completed (Note: The date given is the date used by Historic England as significant for the initial building or that of an important part in the structure's description.)	Grid ref. (Note: The grid reference is based on the British national grid reference system, sometimes known as OSGB36, used by the Ordnance Survey.) Geo-coordinates	Notes	Entry number (Note: The "List Entry Number" is a unique number assigned to each listed building and scheduled monument by Historic England.)	Image	Ref.
Halscombe stone setting 790 m SSW of Simonsbath Bridge	Exmoor	Standing stones	Late Neolithic to Bronze Age	SS 77022 38336; 51°07′52″N 3°45′32″W	Two rows of standing stones, up to 600 millimetres (24 in) high, some of which are now recumbent.	1014281	Upload Photo	
Hillfort on Grabbist Hill, 275 m south west of St Leonard's Well	Dunster	Hillfort	Iron Age	SS 98294 43686; 51°11′00″N 3°27′23″W	Grabbist hillfort is an Iron Age oval hillfort. The fort is 270.0 metres (885.8 ft) long and 219.8 feet (67.0 m) wide, and is surrounded by a counterscarp, which measures 4.2 to 6.2 feet (1.3 to 1.9 m) in height. It is also surrounded by a ditch, which ranges up to 10.0 metres (32.8 ft) wide and 2.2 metres (7.2 ft) deep. The bank has a peak height of 3 metres (9.8 ft), and, on the northern and western sides, there is a second bank, which leads to the northeastern corner being the most strongly defended.		Upload Photo	
Holy well at St Pancras Chapel	Old Cleeve	Well	Middle Ages	ST 04143 39888; 51°09′01″N 3°22′18″W	A stone lined holy well in the grounds of the former St Pancras Chapel which is now a private house.	1020720	Upload Photo	
Horner packhorse bridge	Luccombe	Packhorse bridge	Middle Ages	SS 89733 45541; 51°11′54″N 3°34′47″W	A stone packhorse bridge over Horner Water.	1006228	Horner packhorse bridge More images	
Huish Champflower Barrow	Huish Champflower	Bowl barrow	Late Neolithic to middle Bronze Age	ST 02860 34168; 51°05′55″N 3°23′19″W	A bowl barrow which is 21 metres (69 ft) in diameter.	1020692	Huish Champflower Barrow	
Incised stone W of Stent Hill	Oare	Standing stone	Possibly 7th to 9th century	SS 83210 47374; 51°12′49″N 3°40′24″W	The Culbone Stone, an early mediaeval standing stone approximately one metre in height. It lies in woodland close to the parish boundary, and features an incised wheeled cross, the style of which suggests it dates from 7th to 9th century. The stone is legally protected as a scheduled monument. It has been suggested that the stone has been moved from its original site as part of the Culbone Hill Stone Row.	1006141	Incised stone W of Stent Hill More images	
Iron Age defended settlement above Sweetworthy (eastern of two)	Luccombe	Hillfort	Iron Age	SS 88991 42408; 51°10′12″N 3°35′21″W	One of two Iron Age hillforts within 80 metres (260 ft) of each other. This one is around 37 metres (121 ft) in diameter and surrounded by a bank up to 0.4 metres (1 ft 4 in) high.	1008471	Upload Photo	
Iron Age defended settlement above Sweetworthy (western of two)	Luccombe	Hillfort	Iron Age	SS 88877 42361; 51°10′11″N 3°35′27″W	One of two Iron Age hillforts within 80 metres (260 ft) of each other. This one is around 35 metres (115 ft) in diameter and surrounded by a bank up to 0.5 metres (1 ft 8 in) high.	1008472	Upload Photo	
Iron Age defended settlement, Furzebury Brake	Minehead Without	Enclosure	Iron Age	SS 93590 48299; 51°13′26″N 3°31′31″W	An enclosure and settlement covering 0.22 hectares (0.54 acres) and surrounded by a bank.	1008809	Iron Age defended settlement, Furzebury Brake	
Ironstone mine ventilation flue in Chargot Wood, 1150 m south west of Langham Farm	Luxborough	Chimney	19th century	SS 97346 35779; 51°06′44″N 3°28′04″W	A ventilation chimney at the disused Bearland Wood Iron Mine. A fire at the base of the shaft was used to draw air and gasses from the mine. The chimney is 6.5 metres (21 ft) high and 1.75 metres (5 ft 9 in) in diameter at the base.	1020189	Ironstone mine ventilation flue in Chargot Wood, 1150 m south west of Langham Farm	
Katherine's Well	Selworthy	Well	Middle Ages	SS 91425 46897; 51°12′39″N 3°33′21″W	A natural spring which has been converted into a well by the use of stone slabs.	1020826	Upload Photo	
Kit Barrows Cairns	Cutcombe	Cairn	Neolithic to Bronze Age	SS 90033 42010; 51°10′00″N 3°34′27″W	Two cairns one of which is 24 metres (79 ft) in diameter and the other 12.5 metres (41 ft). Each is around 0.5 metres (1 ft 8 in) high.	1020828	Upload Photo	
Kittuck stone setting and cairn, 200 m south west of Three Combes Foot	Exmoor	Cairn	Bronze Age	SS 82034 43885; 51°10′55″N 3°41′21″W	A cairn and standing stones (some of which are now recumbent).	1014284	Upload Photo	
Lanacombe 1: a stone setting and two cairns on the east side of Lanacombe	Exmoor	Cairn and menhirs	Bronze Age	SS 78117 42770; 51°10′16″N 3°44′41″W	A collection of two cairns, and several standing stones (some of which are now recumbent).	1014273	Upload Photo	
Lanacombe 2: a stone setting and cairn on the east side of Lanacombe	Exmoor	Cairn and menhirs	Bronze Age	SS 78432 42873; 51°10′20″N 3°44′25″W	A collection of cairns, and several standing stones (some of which are now recumbent).	1014274	Upload Photo	
Lanacombe 3: a stone setting and cairn on the east side of Lanacombe	Exmoor	Cairn and menhirs	Bronze Age	SS 78630 42998; 51°10′24″N 3°44′15″W	A collection of cairns, and several standing stones (some of which are now recumbent).	1014275	Upload Photo	
Lanacombe 4: a stone setting on the ENE side of Lanacombe	Exmoor	Menhirs	Bronze Age	SS 78654 43151; 51°10′29″N 3°44′14″W	A collection of several standing stones (some of which are now recumbent).	1014276	Upload Photo	
Lanacombe 5: a stone alignment on the south east side of Lanacombe	Exmoor	Menhirs	Bronze Age	SS 77995 42569; 51°10′09″N 3°44′47″W	A collection of several standing stones (some of which are now recumbent) arranged into three rows	1014277	Upload Photo	
Landacre Bridge	Withypool	Arch bridge	Late Middle Ages	SS8164936129; 51°06′44″N 3°41′32″W	A stone bridge over the River Barle with five arches each with a span of 2.7 metres (9 ft). It was built in the late medieval period with the first documentary evidence being from 1610. Restoration work was undertaken in 1875, and again following damage during flooding in 1952.	1021125	Landacre Bridge	
Later prehistoric defended enclosure, Long Wood	Carhampton	Enclosure	Iron Age	SS 98125 40385; 51°09′13″N 3°27′29″W	An Enclosure which may have been a univallate Iron Age hill fort. The enclosure is approximately 40 metres (130 ft) in diameter and covers around 0.15 hectares (0.37 acres). It is surrounded by a bank and ditch about 6.5 metres (21 ft) wide and 1.9 metres (6 ft 3 in) high. The hill fort has been damaged in recent years due to forestry plantation.	1008255	Later prehistoric defended enclosure, Long Wood	
Leather Barrow	Luxborough	Bowl barrow	Neolithic to Bronze Age	SS 98906 35534; 51°06′37″N 3°26′44″W	A bowl barrow with a diameter of 23 metres (75 ft) and height of 3.3 metres (11 ft).	1021158	Upload Photo	
Lock up 60 m south east of St Mary's Church	Brompton Regis	Village lock-up	Late 18th century	SS 95176 31441; 51°04′22″N 3°29′51″W	A small stone building used as the village lock-up. The original door has been blocked up and a new doorway constructed.	1021157	Lock up 60 m south east of St Mary's Church More images	
Long Chains Combe North: a stone setting 120 m WNW of the sheepfold	Exmoor	Standing stones	Neolithic to Bronze Age	SS 74570 42358; 51°10′00″N 3°47′43″W	Three standing stones between 300 millimetres (12 in) and 450 millimetres (18 in) high.	1014280	Upload Photo	
Long Chains Combe South: two standing stones 380 m south west of the sheepfold	Exmoor	Standing stones	Neolithic to Bronze Age	SS 74387 42093; 51°09′51″N 3°47′52″W	Two standing stones between 300 millimetres (12 in) and 530 millimetres (21 in) high.	1014279	Upload Photo	
Malmsmead Bridge	Oare	Packhorse bridge	17th century	SS 79193 47723; 51°12′57″N 3°43′52″W	A stone two arch packhorse bridge carrying a minor road over Badgworthy Water.	1006229	Malmsmead Bridge More images	
Motte and bailey at Dunster Castle	Dunster	Castle	11th century	SS9919643490; 51°10′54″N 3°26′37″W	Dunster Castle is a former motte and bailey castle and now a country house on the top of a steep hill called the Tor. It has been fortified since the late Anglo-Saxon period. After the Norman conquest of England in the 11th century, William de Mohun constructed a timber castle on the site as part of the pacification of Somerset. A stone shell keep was built on the motte by the start of the 12th century, and the castle survived a siege during the early years of the Anarchy. At the end of the 14th century the de Mohuns sold the castle to the Luttrell family, who continued to occupy the property until the late 20th century. In 1976 Colonel Walter Luttrell gave Dunster Castle and most of its contents to the National Trust, which operates it as a tourist attraction.	1020410	Motte and bailey at Dunster Castle More images	
Mounsey Castle and an associated outwork 100 m to the north	Dulverton	Hillfort	Iron Age	SS 88555 29561; 51°03′16″N 3°35′36″W	Earthworks of Mounsey Castle, an Iron Age irregular triangular earthwork. It is surrounded by the remains of coursed stone walling, with an entrance to the west. It overlooks the River Barle.	1021357	Mounsey Castle and an associated outwork 100 m to the north	
Oare Bridge	Oare	Bridge	Possibly 18th century	SS 80211 47452; 51°12′18″N 3°41′24″W	Robber's Bridge is an old masonry arch bridge in the royal forest of Exmoor, carrying the minor road from Porlock Hill to Oare. It crosses Weir Water and is located down a steep, wooded lane beneath overhanging trees.	1006196	Oare Bridge	
Old Barrow on Old Barrow Down	Withypool and Hawkridge	Bowl barrow	Neolithic to Bronze Age	SS 84085 32447; 51°04′47″N 3°39′22″W	A bowl barrow which is 20.9 metres (69 ft) in diameter and 1.5 metres (4 ft 11 in) high.	1021356	Upload Photo	
Oldberry Castle	Dulverton	Hillfort	Iron Age	SS 90942 28226; 51°02′35″N 3°33′25″W	Oldberry Castle (sometimes called Oldbury Castle) is an Iron Age hill fort. The site overlooks the town and the ancient crossing point of the River Barle. It is an irregular oval shape measuring 220 metres (720 ft) by 300 feet (91 m). It is defended by a bank measuring 3.0 metres (10 ft) wide and 6 feet (1.8 m) high, and a 5.5 metres (18 ft) wide ditch.	1006168	Oldberry Castle	
Packhorse bridge 60 m north east of Royal Oak Farm	Winsford	Bridge	Middle Ages	SS 90551 34885; 51°06′10″N 3°33′53″W	A stone packhorse bridge over Winn Brook.	1021124	Packhorse bridge 60 m north east of Royal Oak Farm More images	
Packhorse bridge 75 m south east of The Old Vicarage	Winsford	Packhorse bridge	Middle Ages	SS 90570 35160; 51°06′19″N 3°33′52″W	A medieval stone packhorse bridge, with two arches, over the River Exe.	1021123	Packhorse bridge 75 m south east of The Old Vicarage	
Porlock Allotment stone alignment and cairn, 450 m west of Porlock stone circle	Porlock	Standing stones and a cairn	Bronze Age	SS 84055 44701; 51°11′23″N 3°39′38″W	A collection of standing stones and a cairn.	1014268	Upload Photo	
Porlock Allotment 1: a stone alignment 450 m SSE of Black Barrow	Porlock	Standing stones	Neolithic to Bronze Age	SS 83359 43784; 51°10′53″N 3°40′13″W	Three standing and five recumbent stones.	1014270	Upload Photo	
Porlock Hill stone setting, 150 m north west of the cattle grid on the A39 at the top of Porlock Hill	Porlock	Standing stones	Neolithic to Bronze Age	SS 86450 46135; 51°12′11″N 3°37′36″W	Three standing stones.	1014267	Upload Photo	
Post-medieval pottery kiln 360 m NNE of the Castle	Dunster	Kiln	18th century	SS 99226 43862; 51°11′06″N 3°26′36″W	A stone pottery kiln.	1020409	Upload Photo	
Ralegh's Cross	Nettlecombe	Cross	13th century	ST 03886 34415; 51°06′04″N 3°22′26″W	The remains of a cross dating from around 1300. A stone base supports the remains of the shaft which is now 0.7 metres (2 ft 4 in) high.	1020722	Upload Photo	
Raleigh's Cross iron mine, 310 m south east of Heather House	Huish Champflower	Earthworks	1850s	ST 02526 34212; 51°05′56″N 3°23′36″W	Earthworks and ruins from an iron mine opened in the 1850s. The buildings were demolished in 1907.	1021351	Upload Photo	
Remains of 14th century chantry at Kilve	Kilve	Chantry Chapel	1329	ST 14644 44021; 51°11′20″N 3°13′22″W	The ruins of a Chantry Chapel formed in 1329. The stonework is Blue Lias but is now ruined and covered in ivy. Little of the slate roof remains. The building was previously thatched.	1002960	Remains of 14th century chantry at Kilve	
Remains of St Andrew's Chapel, 80 m north west of Chapel Cross	Luccombe	Earthworks	Middle Ages	SS 90577 44865; 51°11′33″N 3°34′02″W	The remaining walls and footings of a medieval chapel	1021120	Remains of St Andrew's Chapel, 80 m north west of Chapel Cross	
Rexy Barrow, Little Buscombe	Exmoor	Bowl barrow	Bronze Age	SS 77019 41950; 51°09′49″N 3°45′37″W	A bowl barrow which is 18 metres (59 ft) in diameter.	1006208	Upload Photo	
Ring cairn on West Hill	East Quantoxhead	Cairn	Bronze Age	ST 12327 41573; 51°10′00″N 3°15′19″W	A stone cairn with a surrounding rim of 15.3 metres (50 ft) diameter.	1014121	Upload Photo	
Road Castle	Winsford	Hill fort	Iron Age	SS 86289 37578; 51°07′34″N 3°37′35″W	Road Castle is an Iron Age bank and ditch enclosure. The ditch is almost square in plan with rounded corners and covers an area of approximately 0.28 hectares (0.7 acres).	1021360	Upload Photo	
Round barrow 200 ft (60 m) NW of Setta Barrow, Bray Common	Brayford	Round barrow	Bronze Age	SS 72523 38098; 51°07′40″N 3°49′23″W	A 32-metre (105 ft) diameter mound which has been described as both a round barrow and bowl barrow.	1003855	Upload Photo	
Round barrow 720 m NNW of Spire Cross	Winsford	Round barrow	Neolithic to Bronze Age	SS 88639 34246; 51°05′48″N 3°35′30″W	A round barrow which is 15.5 metres (51 ft) in diameter.	1021229	Upload Photo	
Round barrow 500 yd (460 m) WSW of Exe Head	Exmoor	Round barrow	Bronze Age	SS 74702 41411; 51°09′30″N 3°47′35″W	A bowl barrow south of The Chains, which is 12.3 metres (40 ft) in diameter and 0.8 metres (2 ft 7 in) high.	1006212	Upload Photo	
Round barrow 800 yd (730 m) SW of Dunkery Beacon	Cutcombe	Round barrow	Bronze Age	SS 88592 41151; 51°09′31″N 3°35′40″W	A round barrow which is 12.3 metres (40 ft) in diameter.	1006232	Upload Photo	
Round barrow cemetery at Battle Gore immediately west of North Road	Williton	Round barrow	Neolithic to Bronze Age	ST 07444 41392; 51°09′51″N 3°19′30″W	Three round barrows and the Neolithic burial chamber.	1019032	Upload Photo	
Round barrow cemetery incorporating Wambarrows on Winsford Hill	Winsford	Round barrow	Bronze Age	SS 87616 34301; 51°05′49″N 3°36′23″W	A round barrow cemetery at Wambarrows on Winsford Hill. There are at least five barrows ranging in diameter from 17.6 metres (58 ft) to 28.8 metres (94 ft).	1021273	Round barrow cemetery incorporating Wambarrows on Winsford Hill	
Round barrow on Great Tom's Hill	Exmoor	Round barrow	Bronze Age	SS 80496 43113; 51°10′29″N 3°42′39″W	A 12.5-metre (41 ft) diameter stony mound covered in turf.	1003032	Upload Photo	
Round barrow on Roosthitchen	Exmoor	Cairn	Prehistoric	SS 72192 40151; 51°08′47″N 3°49′43″W	A turf covered mound with stones protruding from it. It was previously classified as a barrow.	1006164	Upload Photo	
Round cairn 280 m south of Rex Stile Head	Wootton Courtenay	Cairn	Neolithic to Bronze Age	SS 90447 42282; 51°10′09″N 3°34′06″W	A 9.4-metre (31 ft) diameter stoney mound.	1020932	Upload Photo	
Round cairn 550 m north east of Joaney How Cairn	Wootton Courtenay	Cairn	Neolithic to Bronze Age	SS 91265 43105; 51°10′36″N 3°33′24″W	A round cairn which is 15 metres (49 ft) in diameter.	1020927	Upload Photo	
Round cairn 750 m south east of Joaney How Cairn	Wootton Courtenay	Cairn	Neolithic to Bronze Age	SS 91445 42371; 51°10′13″N 3°33′15″W	An earth and stone mound, 8 metres (26 ft) in diameter and 1 metre (3 ft 3 in) high.	1020928	Upload Photo	
Round cairn 1000 m ESE of Joaney How Cairn	Wootton Courtenay	Cairn	Neolithic to Bronze Age	SS 91732 42385; 51°10′13″N 3°33′00″W	A cairn of 9 metres (30 ft) diameter.	1020929	Upload Photo	
Round cairn cemetery, 570 m east of Selworthy Beacon	Minehead Without	Cairns	Late Neolithic to Bronze Age	SS 92175 48044; 51°13′18″N 3°32′42″W	A collection of nine round cairns on a ridge of Selworthy Beacon.	1020794	Upload Photo	
Round cairn cemetery on Dunkery Hill	Luccombe	Cairn	Neolithic to Bronze Age	SS 90883 42778; 51°10′26″N 3°33′44″W	A collection of five round cairns each of which is between 21.5 metres (71 ft) and 24 metres (79 ft) in diameter.	1020930	Upload Photo	
Round cairn known as Pixie's Mound	Stogursey	Cairn	Bronze Age	ST 20907 45575; 51°12′14″N 3°08′01″W	A cairn which is 27 metres (89 ft) in diameter and 1.7 metres (5 ft 7 in) high. Excavations have found the remains of several bodies and flint tools.	1006226	Upload Photo	
Ruined cairn on Higher Hare Knap	Holford	Cairn	Bronze Age	ST 14844 39516; 51°08′55″N 3°13′08″W	A cairn or round barrow which is between 21 metres (69 ft) and 26.5 metres (87 ft) in diameter.	1006144	Upload Photo	
Selworthy Beacon cairn	Minehead Without	Cairn	Neolithic to Bronze Age revised 16th century	SS 91868 47981; 51°13′15″N 3°32′59″W	A cemetery cairn which was adapted in the 16th century for use as a fire beacon. The original earth and stone mound is topped with a 7 metres (23 ft) diameter stone heap.	1020793	Selworthy Beacon cairn	
Setta Barrow and three round barrows to the south	Brayford Exmoor	Round barrow	Bronze Age	SS 72545 37699; 51°07′28″N 3°49′21″W	Several bowl and round barrows ranging from 10 metres (33 ft) to 28 metres (92 ft) in diameter.	1003856	Upload Photo	
Standing stones on Manor allotment	Oare	Standing stones	Prehistoric	SS 80180 43287; 51°10′34″N 3°42′56″W	A line of three small stones.	1006165	Upload Photo	
St Leonard's Well	Dunster	Holy well	Middle Ages	SS 98504 43867; 51°11′04″N 3°27′13″W	A 16th century stone well house over a medieval holy well. It may have been the water supply for Dunster Priory.	1021154	St Leonard's Well	
Stogursey Castle	Stogursey	Motte-and-bailey castle	11th or 12th century	ST 20326 42575; 51°10′36″N 3°08′32″W	Stogursey Castle was built in the late 11th or early 12th century. The castle was a motte-and-bailey design with a 60 metre wide, two metre tall motte and two bailey enclosures, surrounded by a water-filled moat. The castle was controlled by King John of England during the First Barons' War, and was ordered to be destroyed in 1215, but survived; John's lieutenant Falkes de Breauté took control of the castle, and after his death a second order to destroy the property was given in 1228, again apparently ignored. The castle was extended in stone in 1300 by the Fitzpayne family, but was destroyed in the 1450s by the Yorkist faction during the War of the Roses.	1019035	Stogursey Castle More images	
Stone circle, Porlock Common	Porlock	Stone circle	Neolithic to Bronze Age	SS 84520 44656; 51°11′22″N 3°39′14″W	A stone circle which originally had 21 stones. 14 stones remain half of which are upright and the other half recumbent. The tallest of the standing stones is 0.8 metres (2 ft 7 in) high.	1006189	Stone circle, Porlock Common More images	
Stone circle on Withypool Hill 670 m ESE of Portford Bridge	Withypool and Hawkridge	Stone circle	Neolithic to Bronze Age	SS 83827 34313; 51°05′47″N 3°39′37″W	A stone circle which has 25 standing stones, some which were previously part of the circle are no longer present. The circle has a diameter of 36 metres (118 ft).	1021261	Stone circle on Withypool Hill 670 m ESE of Portford Bridge More images	
Stringston churchyard cross	Stringston	Cross	Late 14th century	ST 17647 42388; 51°10′29″N 3°10′46″W	A cross dating from the 14th century, which is on the Heritage at Risk Register. It has two steps and an octagonal shaft supporting a canopied head.	1006171	Stringston churchyard cross	
Swap Hill standing stone 200 m south east of the Long Combe sheep pen	Exmoor	Standing stone	Neolithic to Bronze Age	SS 80513 42669; 51°10′15″N 3°42′38″W	A 23-centimetre (9.1 in) high standing stone and a split fragment from the stone.	1014272	Upload Photo	
Swap Hill stone setting, 275 m south east of the Long Combe sheep pen	Exmoor	Standing stones	Neolithic to Bronze Age	SS805426; 51°10′12″N 3°42′35″W	Six standing stones the tallest of which are 90 centimetres (35 in) high.	1014282	Upload Photo	
Sweetworthy deserted medieval settlement	Luccombe	Earthworks	Middle Ages	SS 88783 42383; 51°10′11″N 3°35′32″W	Earthworks of several buildings cut into the terraces on the side of the hill. It has been added to the Heritage at Risk Register because of the vulnerability to plant growth.	1008469	Upload Photo	
Sweetworthy Iron Age defended settlement	Luccombe	Hillfort	Iron Age	SS 89050 42534; 51°10′17″N 3°35′25″W	A defended settlement on the north-facing slope of Dunkery Hill. It has a single rampart and external ditch, enclosing 0.25 hectares (0.62 acres). The rampart is still visible and the ditch on the east side is used as a trackway.	1008470	Upload Photo	
Tarr Steps	Dulverton	Clapper bridge	Middle Ages	SS8677032116; 51°04′38″N 3°37′04″W	The Tarr Steps are a clapper bridge across the River Barle in the Exmoor National Park. A typical clapper bridge construction, the bridge possibly dates to around 1000 BC. The stone slabs weigh up to 1-2 tons apiece. The bridge is 55 metres (180 ft) long and has 17 spans.	1021325	Tarr Steps More images	
The Incline, lying between Brendon Hill and Comberow, and the remains of Combe Row Station	Old Cleeve	Inclined plane	1861	ST 02648 34928; 51°06′19″N 3°23′31″W	A rope-worked inclined plane 997 metres (3,272 ft) long to bring the ore down a 230 metres (770 ft) vertical interval on a 1 in 4 gradient on the West Somerset Mineral Railway.	1021350	The Incline, lying between Brendon Hill and Comberow, and the remains of Combe Row Station More images	
The Mound, Stoke Ridge, Stoke Pero	Luccombe	Round barrow	Bronze Age	SS 88098 43108; 51°10′34″N 3°36′08″W	A possible round barrow which is 7 metres (23 ft) long and 6 metres (20 ft) wide.	1006190	The Mound, Stoke Ridge, Stoke Pero	
The Whit Stones: two standing stones 230 m west of Whitstone Post	Porlock	Standing stones	Neolithic to Bronze Age	SS 85330 46250; 51°12′14″N 3°38′34″W	Two standing stones 7 metres (23 ft) apart. Each is 85 centimetres (33 in) to 90 centimetres (35 in) high.	1014269	The Whit Stones: two standing stones 230 m west of Whitstone Post More images	
The Yarn Market	Dunster	Market cross	1609	SS9915243812; 51°11′05″N 3°26′40″W	The octagonal Yarn Market has a central stone pier which supports a heavy timber framework for the structure. The slate roof has a central wooden lantern topped by a weather vane. The roof is interrupted by a series of dormer windows. Around the periphery is a low stone wall and vertical timber supports. One of the roof beams has a hole in it, a result of cannon fire in the Civil War, when Dunster Castle was a besieged Royalist stronghold. Following the damage, it was restored in 1647 to its present condition.	1015706	The Yarn Market More images	
Three bowl barrows on Black Hill, 590 m north west of Crowcombe Park Gate	Holford	Bowl barrow	Bronze Age	ST 14738 38364; 51°08′18″N 3°13′12″W	Three bowl barrows which are between 5 metres (16 ft) and 13 metres (43 ft) in diameter.	1017219	Upload Photo	
Three round barrows on Withycombe Common, 360 m north of Fire Tower	Withycombe	Round barrow	Neolithic to Bronze Age	SS 98668 39592; 51°08′47″N 3°27′00″W	Three round barrows two of which are approximately 12 metres (39 ft) in diameter. The largest, most southerly is the largest at approximately 28 metres (92 ft) in diameter and has an Ordnance Survey trig point on it.	1021119	Three round barrows on Withycombe Common, 360 m north of Fire Tower	
Trendle Ring hillfort and associated outwork	Bicknoller	Hill fort	Bronze Age to Iron Age	ST 11825 39359; 51°08′48″N 3°15′43″W	Trendle Ring is a late prehistoric earthwork. The site, which covers 0.8 hectares (2.0 acres), is surrounded by a single rampart with a ditch and has a simple opening on the east, uphill side. The hillside is steep and there are two areas which may have been more level platforms. It is situated on the slope of a hill which rises 130 metres (430 ft) above the ring.	1008249	Trendle Ring hillfort and associated outwork	
Tripp round barrow NW of Tripp Farm	Clatworthy	Round barrow	Bronze Age	ST 03771 33408; 51°05′31″N 3°22′32″W	A round barrow approximately 20 metres (66 ft) in diameter.	1006125	Tripp round barrow NW of Tripp Farm	
Trout Hill 1: a stone setting on the north east end of Trout Hill 550 m south west of the foot bridge over Badgworthy Water	Exmoor	Standing stone	Neolithic to Bronze Age	SS 79399 43226; 51°10′32″N 3°43′36″W	Five standing stones, one of which is broken, in two intersecting rows. The largest is 70 centimetres (28 in) high.	1014264	Upload Photo	
Trout Hill 2: a stone setting on the north east end of Trout Hill 610 m south of the foot bridge over Badgworthy Water	Exmoor	Standing stone	Neolithic to Bronze Age	SS 79554 43124; 51°10′29″N 3°43′27″W	Three standing and one recumbent stones. One other stone was demolished by an unexploded shell in the 1970s leaving a crater on the site.	1014265	Upload Photo	
Trout Hill 3: a stone setting on the north east end of Trout Hill 850 m SSW of the foot bridge over Badgeworthy Water	Exmoor	Standing stone	Neolithic to Bronze Age	SS 79412 42885; 51°10′21″N 3°43′35″W	Two standing and two recumbent stones. The tallest standing stone is 30 centimetres (12 in) high.	1014266	Upload Photo	
'Two Barrows', group of barrows (Hangley Cleave)	North Molton	Bowl barrows	Bronze Age	SS 74635 36212; 51°06′41″N 3°47′32″W	A group of four bowl barrows which straddles the border between Somerset and Devon.	1006210	'Two Barrows', group of barrows (Hangley Cleave)	
Two bowl barrows on Beacon Hill	West Quantoxhead	Bowl barrow	Neolithic to Bronze Age	ST 12444 40997; 51°09′41″N 3°15′13″W	Two bowl barrows each approximately 24 metres (79 ft) in diameter. An Ordnance Survey trig point is on the more southerly of the two barrows.	1014122	Two bowl barrows on Beacon Hill	
Two cairns on Great Hill, 470 m south and 750 m south west of Quantock Farm	Crowcombe	Cairn	Bronze Age	ST 15657 36251; 51°07′09″N 3°12′23″W	Two cairns approximately 300 metres (980 ft) apart. The mound on the summit of the hill is 21 metres (69 ft) in diameter and the other 28 metres (92 ft).	1020364	Two cairns on Great Hill, 470 m south and 750 m south west of Quantock Farm	
Two cairns and two bowl barrows on Weacombe Hill, 440 m south of Bicknoller Post	Bicknoller	Cairns and bowl barrows	Bronze Age	ST 12862 39893; 51°09′06″N 3°14′50″W	Two cairns and two bowl barrows dating from the Bronze Age three of them have been disturbed or partially excavated in the past.	1014126	Upload Photo	
Two round barrows on Culbone Hill	Oare	Round barrows or cairns	Bronze Age	SS 82400 47603; 51°12′56″N 3°41′06″W	Grass covered stony mounds previously classified as cairns and now as round barrows. Each approximately 10 metres (33 ft) in diameter.	1006207	Upload Photo	
Two round barrows on Heydon Hill	Huish Champflower	Round barrow	Bronze Age	ST 03624 27978; 51°02′35″N 3°22′34″W	Two barrows, partially excavated in 1896.	1006143	Upload Photo	
Two round cairns on Dunkery Hill, 390 m and 420 m south east of Rex Stile Head	Wootton Courtenay	Cairn	Neolithic to Bronze Age	SS 90779 42302; 51°10′10″N 3°33′49″W	Two mounds, one of 11 metres (36 ft) in diameter and the other 9 metres (30 ft).	1020926	Upload Photo	
Two standing stones and a mound 200 m WSW of Black Barrow, Hoscombe	Exmoor	Standing stones	Neolithic to Bronze Age	SS 83011 44163; 51°11′05″N 3°40′31″W	Two stones 4.7 metres (15 ft) apart. One is 25 centimetres (9.8 in) high and the other 10 centimetres (3.9 in) high. The 5 metres (16 ft) wide mound is 11.7 metres (38 ft) from the nearest stone.	1014271	Upload Photo	
Village cross 75 m north of St Andrew's Well	Stogursey	Cross	13th or 14th century	ST 20241 42891; 51°10′47″N 3°08′33″W	The remains of a Hamstone village cross on the High Street is from the Middle Ages. Approximately 1 metre (3 ft 3 in) of the original shaft is still in the socket stone.	1019034	Upload Photo	
Wayside cross 100 m south east of Doniford Farm	Williton	Cross	Middle Ages	ST 08838 42897; 51°10′41″N 3°18′20″W	The socket stone and part of the shaft of a medieval cross on the main street in Doniford.	1019292	Wayside cross 100 m south east of Doniford Farm	
Wayside cross at junction of High Street and Bank Street	Williton	Cross	Middle Ages	ST 07737 40924; 51°09′36″N 3°19′15″W	The remains of a medieval cross which still has its octagonal base and 0.75 metres (2 ft 6 in) of the shaft.	1017292	Wayside cross at junction of High Street and Bank Street	
West Luccombe packhorse bridge	Luccombe	Packhorse bridge	Middle Ages	SS 89886 46119; 51°12′13″N 3°34′39″W	A single arch packhorse bridge built of red sandstone.	1006227	West Luccombe packhorse bridge More images	
Wilmersham Common West: a stone row 120 m south east of the confluence of Chetsford and Embercombe waters	Luccombe	Stone row	Neolithic to Bronze Age	SS 85544 42131; 51°10′01″N 3°38′18″W	Two standing and one recumbent stones.	1014258	Upload Photo	
Wilmersham Common stone row 320 m south east of the confluence of Embercombe and Chetsford waters	Luccombe	Stone row	Neolithic to Bronze Age	SS 85670 41976; 51°09′56″N 3°38′11″W	A 68-metre (223 ft) long row of 50 standing stones. The tallest of which is 60 centimetres (24 in) high.	1014257	Upload Photo	
Wiveliscombe Barrow	Brompton Regis	Bowl barrow	Neolithic to Bronze Age	ST 00553 34857; 51°06′16″N 3°25′18″W	Wiveliscombe Barrow. which was previously known as Eastern Barrow is 20.5 metres (67 ft) in diameter.	1020773	Wiveliscombe Barrow	
Wood Barrow round barrow	Challacombe	Bowl barrow	Neolithic to Bronze Age	SS 71631 42506; 51°10′03″N 3°50′15″W	A bowl barrow approximately 28 metres (92 ft) in diameter.	1003838; 1006209	Wood Barrow round barrow	
World War II pillbox 100 m west of Ralegh's Cross Hotel	Clatworthy	Pillbox	1940	ST 03837 34397; 51°06′03″N 3°22′29″W	A Type 24 pillbox made of reinforced concrete.	1020723	Upload Photo	
World War II pillbox at Vale House, 120 m north east of Glasses Farm	Old Cleeve	Pillbox	1940	ST 02792 38004; 51°07′59″N 3°23′27″W	A concrete pillbox which is 2.6 metres (8 ft 6 in) high.	1020726	World War II pillbox at Vale House, 120 m north east of Glasses Farm	

== See also ==
- Scheduled monuments in West Somerset – overview of scheduled monuments
- Scheduled monuments in West Somerset (A–G) – list of scheduled monuments
- Scheduled monuments in Taunton Deane – overview and list of scheduled monuments
