= Packhorse bridge =

Type of bridge

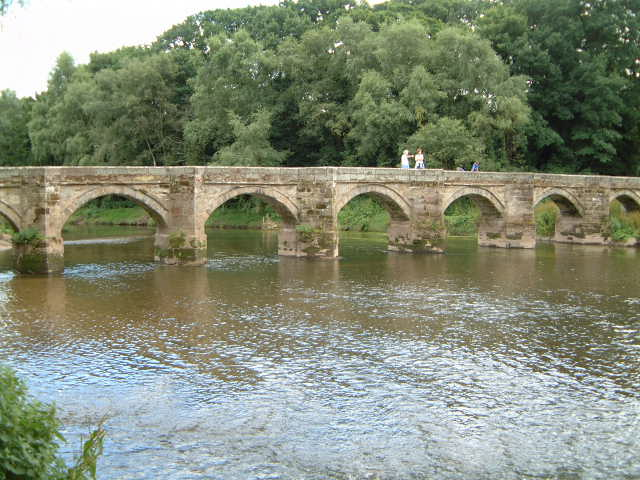
Essex Bridge, a packhorse bridge across the River Trent

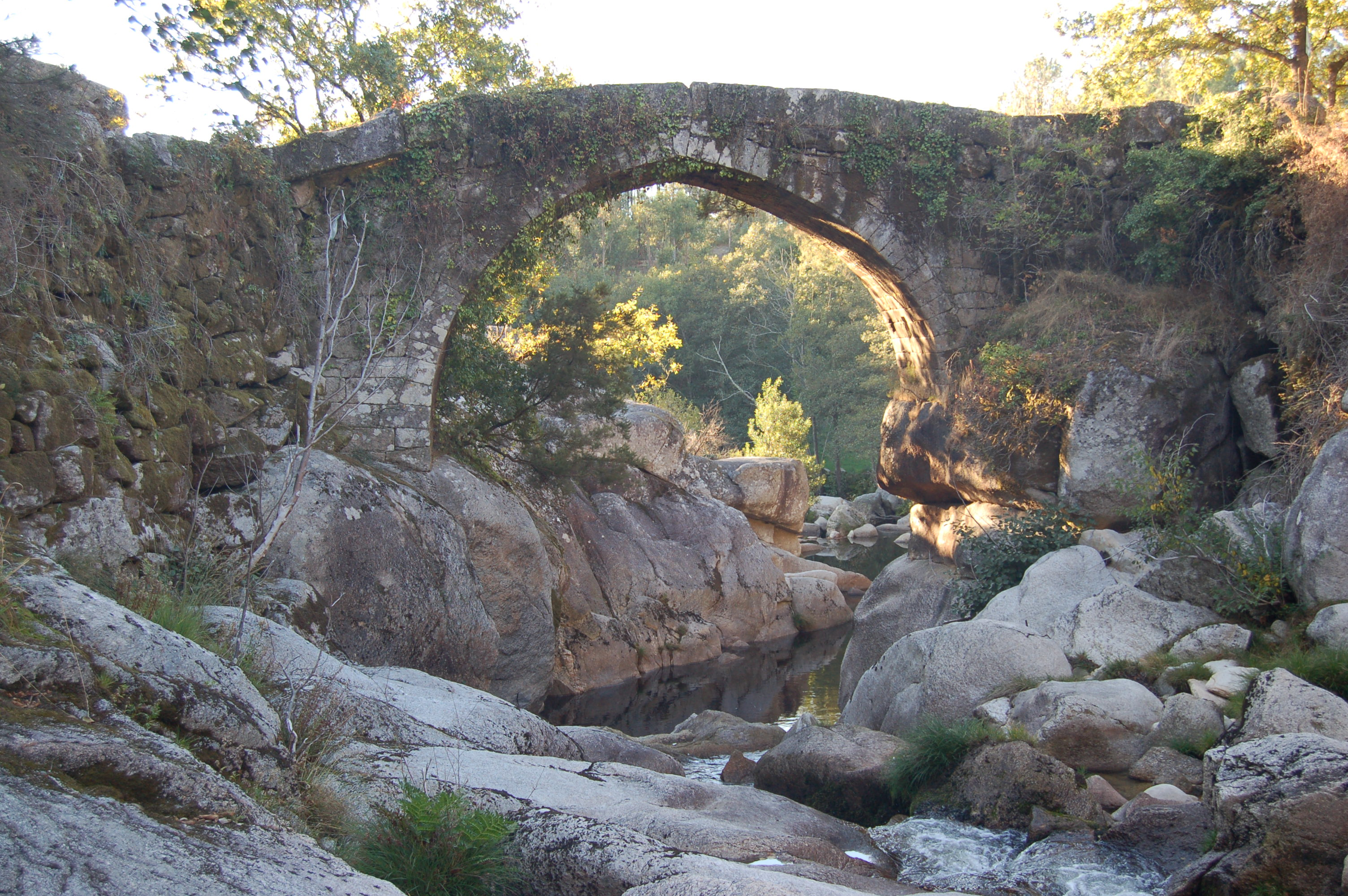
Medieval packhorse bridge crossing the Almofrei at Cotobade, Galicia

A packhorse bridge is a bridge intended to carry packhorses (horses loaded with sidebags or panniers) across a river or stream. Typically a packhorse bridge consists of one or more narrow (one horse wide) masonry arches, and has low parapets so as not to interfere with the panniers borne by the horses. Multi-arched examples sometimes have triangular cutwaters that are extended upward to form pedestrian refuges.

Packhorse bridges were often built on the trade routes (often called packhorse routes) that formed major transport arteries across Europe and Great Britain until the coming of the turnpike roads and canals in the 18th century. Before the road-building efforts of Napoleon, all crossings of the Alps were on packhorse trails. Travellers' carriages were dismantled and transported over the mountain passes by ponies and mule trains.

== Definition ==
In the British Isles at least, the definition of a packhorse bridge is somewhat nebulous. Ernest Hinchliffe discusses the difficulty of defining a true packhorse bridge in A Guide to the Packhorse Bridges of England. He claims that "before the eighteenth century bridges were described as 'horse bridges' or 'cart bridges'" and his strict definition excludes the latter. He suggests that a classic packhorse bridge should generally be:

- less than 6 feet (1.8 m) in width;
- built before 1800;
- on a recognised packhorse route.

He categorises the 190 English bridges listed in his book into three groups:

- Group 1: 6 feet (1.8 m) wide or less, built before 1800 and with known packhorse associations;
- Group 2: bridges that fail one or other of the above criteria, but which are generally referred to as packhorse bridges;
- Group 3: bridges sometimes claimed as packhorse bridges, but dismissed as such by the author.

The difficulty of classification is illustrated by Moulton Bridge in Suffolk, which Hinchliffe places in Group 1 but which English Heritage describes as "perhaps not strictly a packhorse bridge since it was wide enough to take carts".

== List of packhorse bridges in the British Isles ==
The following list includes all listed buildings described as packhorse bridges by English Heritage, Cadw, or Historic Scotland; all 106 of Hinchliffe's Group 1 bridges in England; and certain other candidates. (For England, Hinchliffe's Group numbers are given as superscripts after the bridge name.)

=== England ===
County	Location	Name^{Group}	Photograph	Crosses	Notes
Bedfordshire	Sutton; 52.1117°N 0.2190°W	Sutton Packhorse Bridge^{1}		Potton Brook	Medieval with later repairs; two pointed arches. Grade II* listed, Scheduled monument.
Cheshire	Crowton; 53.2702°N 2.6262°W			Acton Brook	Single segmental arch. Carries public bridleway.
Cheshire	Hockenhull Platts; 53.1861°N 2.7848°W	Roman Bridges^{1}		River Gowy	Three bridges, "probably late 18th-century" or "late 17th-century". Grade II listed. The three bridges carry a public byway.
Cheshire	Quarry Bank Mill, Styal; 53.3440°N 2.2503°W	The Packhorse Bridge		River Bollin	1820, single segmental arch. Grade II listed. Carries a public byway.
Cheshire/Derbyshire	Three Shire Heads; 53.2139°N 1.9875°W	Three Shire Heads Bridge^{2}		River Dane	Probably late 18th-century; single span. Grade II listed. Carries public byway.
Cornwall	Bowithick; 50.6154°N 4.5691°W	Bowithick Bridge		Penpont Water	Probably early 19th-century; three stone arches, one larger and two small. Grade II listed.
Cornwall	Launceston; 50.641492°N 4.366202°W	West Bridge (Prior's Bridge)		River Kensey	Late medieval; five-span bridge with two cut-waters. Grade I listed.
Cumbria	Ambleside; 54.4525°N 2.9592°W	High Sweden Bridge^{1}		Scandale Beck	Late 17th-century; single-span. Grade II listed.< Carries public footpath.
Cumbria	Barbon; 54.2306°N 2.5937°W	High Beckfoot Bridge^{1}		Barbon Beck	Probably late 17th- or 18th-century; described as "ruinous" in 1725. Single-span. Grade II listed. Carries public bridleway.
Cumbria	Dean; 54.6246°N 3.4592°W	Calva Hall packhorse bridge^{1}		River Marron	Dated 1697; single-span. Grade II listed.
Cumbria	Drigg; 54.3756°N 3.4224°W	Drigg Holme Packhorse Bridge^{1}		River Irt	Single-span. Scheduled monument. Carries public bridleway.
Cumbria	Eskdale; 54.3956°N 3.2499°W	Doctor[s] Bridge^{2}		River Esk	Probably 17th-century, widened in 1734. Grade II listed. Carries public road.
Cumbria	Gaisgill; 54.4527°N 2.5609°W	Barugh Bridge^{1}		Rais Gill	Probably 18th-century, but maybe earlier. Grade II listed. Carries public byway.
Cumbria	Knock; 54.6506°N 2.4791°W			Swindale Beck	Possibly 17th-century; single segmental arch. Grade II listed.
Cumbria	Little Langdale; 54.4178°N 3.0616°W	Slater[s] Bridge^{1}		River Brathay	17th-century; two clapper slabs and a single arch. Grade II* listed. Carries public footpath.
Cumbria	Lowgill; 54.3621°N 2.5921°W	Lowgill Packhorse Bridge		Lowgill Beck	Probably 17th- or 18th-century; single-span. Grade II listed.
Cumbria	Pennington; 54.2066°N 3.1411°W	Devil's Bridge^{1}		Rathmoss Beck	17th- or 18th-century; single-span. Grade II listed. Alongside public road.
Cumbria	Sca Fell; 54.4221°N 3.1923°W	Lingcove or Throstlegarth Bridge^{1}		Lingcove Beck	Single arch. On Open Access land.
Cumbria	Seathwaite, Allerdale; 54.4877°N 3.1830°W	Stockley Bridge^{2}		Grains Gill	Early- or mid-18th-century; single span. Grade II listed. Carries public bridleway.
Cumbria	Shap; 54.5364°N 2.7197°W	Parish Crag Bridge^{1}		Swindale Beck	Probably 18th-century; single span. Grade II listed. Carries public footpath.
Cumbria	Shap; 54.5378°N 2.7515°W	Park Bridge^{2}		Haweswater Beck	1860–69; single span. Carries public footpath.
Cumbria	Stainton; 54.2666°N 2.7327°W	packhorse bridge^{1}		Stainton Beck	Probably 17th-century; single segmental arch. Grade II listed. Adjacent to ford.
Cumbria	Ullock; 54.6020°N 3.4318°W	packhorse bridge^{1}		Black Beck	Single span.
Cumbria	Wasdale Head; 54.4682°N 3.2567°W	Row Bridge^{1}		Mosedale Beck	Probably 18th-century; single span. Grade II listed.
Cumbria	Watendlath; 54.5371°N 3.1214°W	Watendlath Packhorse Bridge^{1}		Watendlath Beck	18th-century; single span. Grade II listed. Carries public bridleway.
Cumbria	Wilton; 54.4790°N 3.4460°W	Monk's Bridge^{1}		River Calder	Probably 17th- or 18th-century; single span. Also known as High Wath Bridge, Mattie Benn's Bridge, Hannah Benn Bridge and Roman Bridge. Grade II listed.
Cumbria	Winster; 54.3408°N 2.9051°W			tributary of River Winster	Probably 17th-century. Grade II listed. Adjacent to A5074 road.
Cumbria	Winster; 54.3269°N 2.9021°W	Winster Bridge^{1}		River Winster	1729 with 20th-century parapet; single span. Grade II listed.
Derbyshire	Ashford-in-the-Water; 53.2232°N 1.7104°W	Sheepwash Bridge^{2}		River Wye	18th-century; three low arches, with integral walled sheep pen on southern bank. Grade II* listed, Scheduled monument.
Derbyshire	Bakewell; 53.2175°N 1.6788°W	Holme Bridge^{1}		River Wye	1664; five segmental arches. Grade I listed, Scheduled monument. Carries public bridleway.
Derbyshire	Edale; 53.3710°N 1.8161°W	Gibraltar Bridge^{1}		Grindsbrook	18th-century; single span. Grade II listed. Carries public footpath.
Derbyshire	Edale; 53.3721°N 1.8687°W	Youngate or Jacob's Ladder Bridge^{1}		River Noe	Possibly 17th-century; single span. Grade II listed. Carries public bridleway (part of the Pennine Way).
Derbyshire	nr Errwood Hall; 53.2563°N 1.9820°W	Goyts Bridge^{1}		River Goyt	Moved to current position in 1968 from Goyt's Bridge hamlet. In open access land.
Derbyshire	Hayfield; 53.3801°N 1.9263°W	Bowden Bridge^{1}		River Kinder	Probably 18th-century; single-span. Grade II listed. Carries public footpath.
Derbyshire/Staffordshire	Hollinsclough; 53.1988°N 1.9072°W	Hopping Packhorse Bridge^{1}		River Dove	Single semicircular arch. Carries public bridleway.
Derbyshire/Staffordshire	Hollinsclough; 53.2034°N 1.9232°W	Washgate Bridge^{1}		River Dove	Early 18th-century; single-span. Grade II listed, "A rare example of a perfectly preserved packhorse bridge." Carries public byway.
Derbyshire/South Yorkshire	Howden Reservoir; 53.4526°N 1.7467°W	Slippery Stones Bridge^{2}		River Derwent	1672; two segmental arches. Rebuilt 1959 after relocation from Derwent village. Grade II listed, Scheduled monument. Carries public bridleway.
Derbyshire	Lea Hall; 53.0577°N 1.7073°W			Bradbourne Brook	17th-century or earlier; single pointed arch. Formerly Grade II listed, now delisted. On private land.
Derbyshire/South Yorkshire	Longdendale; 53.4962°N 1.7950°W	Ladyshaw Bridge		Salter's Brook	17th-century; single-span. Carries public byway, part of the Trans-Pennine Trail.
Derbyshire/Staffordshire	Milldale; 53.0890°N 1.7938°W	Viator's Bridge^{1}		River Dove	17th-century or earlier; two segmental arches. Grade II listed. Carries public footpath. Mentioned in The Compleat Angler (1653) by Izaak Walton.
Derbyshire	Youlgreave; 53.1732°N 1.6799°W	Bradford Packhorse Bridge^{1}		River Bradford	18th-century, single segmental arch. Grade II listed. Carries public bridleway.
Derbyshire	Youlgreave; 53.1833°N 1.6804°W	Coalpit Bridge^{1}		River Lathkill	Mid-18th-century; three segmental arches. Grade II listed. Carries public bridleway.
Devon	Brendon; 51.2205°N 3.7639°W	Packhorse Bridge		East Lyn River	Probably 17th- or 18th-century; single round arch. Grade II listed.
Devon	Drewsteignton; 50.6955°N 3.7810°W	Fingle Bridge		River Teign	17th-century Grade II* listed three-arch granite bridge carrying unclassified road with pedestrian refuges over cutwaters.
Devon	Membury; 50.8082°N 3.0442°W	Beckford Bridge^{1}		River Yarty	18th- or 19th-century; single-span. Grade II listed, Scheduled monument.
Devon	Sidford; 50.7029°N 3.2229°W	Sidford Bridge^{1}		River Sid	Said to be 12th-century. Grade II listed. Parapets of original packhorse bridge incorporated into widened road bridge of 1930 carrying A3052 road.
Devon	Westcott Barton, Marwood; 51.1269°N 4.1007°W			Knowl Water	Probably 18th- or early 19th-century. Grade II listed. Carries public footpath.
Dorset	near Corfe Castle; 50.6626°N 2.0485°W	Sharford Bridge^{1}		Corfe River	Scheduled monument. Carries public bridleway.
Dorset	Fifehead Neville; 50.8993°N 2.3257°W	Fifehead Neville Packhorse Bridge^{1}		River Divelish	Probably medieval. Grade II listed; two triangular pointed arches. Carries footpath alongside ford on public road.
Dorset	Gussage St Michael; 50.9126°N 2.0282°W	packhorse bridge		River Allen	Probably 18th-century; single semicircular arch. Grade II listed. Carries public footpath.
Dorset	Holwell; 50.9069°N 2.4291°W	packhorse bridge^{1}		Caundle Brook	Probably medieval, with 19th- and 20th-century alterations. Grade II listed. Carries public bridleway.
Dorset	Rampisham; 50.8187°N 2.6232°W	packhorse bridge^{1}		River Frome	16th- or 17th-century alterations; three pointed arches. Grade II listed. Carries public bridleway.
Dorset	Sturminster Marshall; 50.8010°N 2.0782°W	packhorse bridge^{1}		River Winterborne	17th-century; single cambered arch. Grade II listed. Carries public bridleway.
Dorset	Tarrant Monkton; 50.8808°N 2.0793°W	packhorse bridge^{1}		River Tarrant	Probably 17th-century; 3 segmental arches. Grade II listed. Alongside ford on public road.
Durham	Bowes; 54.5350°N 1.9992°W	Nabb Bridge^{1}		Deepdale Beck	1699 per datestone (contra English Heritage listing, which says "Mid C18"); single segmental arch. Grade II listed.
Durham	Brafferton; 54.5682°N 1.5328°W	Ketton Packhorse Bridge^{1}		River Skerne	Late 17th- or early 18th-century; single segmental arch. Grade II listed.
Durham	Cornsay; 54.7941°N 1.7819°W			Pan Burn	Possibly early 18th-century; single wide segmental arch. Grade II listed. On private land.
Durham	Egglestone Abbey; 54.5322°N 1.9052°W	Bow Bridge^{1}		Thorsgill Beck	17th-century; single round arch. Grade II listed.
Durham	Headlam; 54.5653°N 1.7245°W	packhorse bridge^{1}		Headlam or Dyance Beck	Probably 18th-century; single round arch. Grade II listed.
Durham	West Hope; 54.4788°N 1.9524°W	West Hope Packhorse Bridge^{1}		Hill or Waitgill Beck	Single segmental arch.
Essex	Feering; 51.8402°N 0.7071°E	Roman Arches		River Blackwater	c.1750; seven brick arches. Under restoration.
Gloucestershire	Slad; 51.7711°N 2.1647°W	packhorse bridge^{1}		Dillay Brook	Carries public footpath.
Gloucestershire/Warwickshire	Todenham; 52.0357°N 1.6440°W	packhorse bridge^{1}		Knee Brook	Possibly 16th-century in origin, rebuilt 18th century; two semicircular arches. Grade II listed. Carries public bridleway.
Gloucestershire	Wickwar; 51.5914°N 2.3895°W	Sturt Bridge^{1}		Little Avon River	Also known as Roman Arch. Probably late medieval or 16th-/17th-century; two arches. Grade II listed. Carries public footpath.
Greater Manchester	Prestolee; 53.5523°N 2.3767°W	Prestolee Bridge^{1}		River Irwell	Late 18th-century; five semicircular arches with cutwaters. Grade II listed.
Greater Manchester	Strines; 53.3829°N 2.0515°W	Roman Bridge^{1}		River Goyt	18th-century; single segmental span. Grade II listed. Carries public bridleway.
Greater Manchester	Uppermill; 53.5540°N 2.0091°W			Diggle Brook	"Medieval". Adjacent to Oldham & Ripponden Trust Turnpike bridge (1864) and Brownhill Bridge Mill, which is Grade II listed.
Kent	Eynsford; 51.3680°N 0.2109°E	Eynsford Bridge		River Darent	17th-century, two round arches. Grade II listed.
Lancashire	Barrowford; 53.8577°N 2.2105°W	Higherford Old Bridge^{2}		Pendle Water	16th/17th-century, parapets added 1814–15; single span. Grade II* listed, Scheduled monument.
Lancashire	Bleasdale; 53.9066°N 2.6621°W	Brooks Packhorse Bridge^{1}		River Brock	Single-span. Listed per Hinchliffe, but not in English Heritage listings.
Lancashire	Catlow Bottoms; 53.8227°N 2.1770°W	packhorse bridge^{1}		Catlow Brook	"Perhaps C17"; single semicircular arch. Grade II listed.
Lancashire	Capernwray; 53.9041°N 2.3288°W			River Keer	Date uncertain; single semi-elliptical arch. Grade II listed.
Lancashire	Clitheroe; 53.8478°N 2.4511°W	Old Bridge, Lower Hodder; Cromwell's Bridge		River Hodder	c. 1562; three segmental arches, the middle arch being wider. Grade II* listed, Scheduled monument.
Lancashire	Sawley; 54.1408°N 2.7228°W	Swanside Bridge		Smithies Brook	17th-century or earlier; single high segmental arch. Grade II listed. Carries public footpath.
Lancashire	Wycoller; 53.8494°N 2.1043°W	Wycoller Packhorse Bridge^{1}		Wycoller Beck	17th-century or perhaps earlier; two segmental arches. Grade II* listed, Scheduled monument. Carries a public footpath.
Leicestershire	Anstey; 52.6711°N 1.1847°W	Anstey Bridge^{1}		Rothley Brook	Also known as The Old Bridge. Dated by W.G.Hoskins as c. 1500, by Jervoise as late 17th-century, and by English Heritage as 16th/17th-century; five arches. Grade II* listed, Scheduled monument. Carries public footpath.
Leicestershire	Anstey; 52.6750°N 1.1785°W	King William's Bridge^{3}		Rothley Brook	Probably 17th-century; two round arches. Grade II listed. Carries public bridleway.
Leicestershire	Aylestone; 52.6033°N 1.1629°W	Aylestone Old Bridge^{1}		River Soar	Also known as the Roman Bridge. Probably 15th-century; eleven small arches (eight on bridge, three on causeway). Grade II* listed, Scheduled monument.
Leicestershire	Medbourne; 52.5292°N 0.8218°W	packhorse bridge^{1}		Medbourne Brook	Possibly 13th-century; four arches. Scheduled monument.
Leicestershire	Rearsby; 52.7243°N 1.0375°W	Seven Arch Bridge^{1}		Rearsby Brook	Pevsner says medieval, but datestone says 1714; seven semicircular arches, one almost buried. Grade II listed.
Leicestershire	Thurcaston; 52.6900°N 1.1736°W	Coffin Bridge^{1}		Rothley Brook	Three similar bridges between Thurcaston and Cropston: Sandham Bridge (52.6929°N 1.1658°W) and Coffin Bridge (52.6900°N 1.1736°W), both with two arches, and a third, single-span, bridge at 52.6924°N 1.1655°W. All three are 16th- or 17th-century and separately Grade II listed.
Lincolnshire	Utterby; 53.4194°N 0.0369°W	Utterby Packhorse Bridge^{1}			14th-century; double chamfered cambered arch. Grade II* listed.
Lincolnshire	West Rasen; 53.3895°N 0.4028°W	Bishop's Bridge^{1}		River Rase	15th-century; three segmental arches. Grade II* listed, Scheduled monument.
Norfolk	Walsingham; 52.8940°N 0.8770°E	packhorse bridge^{1}		River Stiffkey	Original date unknown, probably reconstructed late 19th century; four small arches. Grade II listed. In grounds of Walsingham Abbey.
Northamptonshire	Charwelton; 52.2003°N 1.2186°W	Charwelton Bridge^{1}		River Cherwell	Probably 15th-century; two pointed arches. Grade II listed, Scheduled monument. Carries roadside pavement.
Northumberland	Ovingham; 54.9672°N 1.8709°W	Ovingham Packhorse Bridge^{1}		Whittle Burn	18th-century per English Heritage (Hinchliffe says 1698); two segmental arches. Grade II listed.
North Yorkshire	Aldbrough St John; 54.4975°N 1.6893°W	packhorse bridge^{1}		Aldbrough Beck	Possibly 16th- or 17th-century; three segmental pointed arches. Grade II listed. Carries public footpath.
North Yorkshire	Birstwith; 54.0381°N 1.6415°W	New Bridge^{1}		River Nidd	Also known as Haxby Bridge. 1822; single-span. Grade II listed. Carries public right-of-way.
North Yorkshire	Boltby; 54.2728°N 1.2470°W	packhorse bridge^{1}		Gurtof Beck	Single semicircular arch.
North Yorkshire	Clapham; 54.1185°N 2.3918°W	Brokken Bridge^{1}		Clapham Beck	Probably 18th-century; single segmental arch. Carries public footpath.
North Yorkshire	Croft-on-Tees; 54.4848°N 1.5680°W	Clow Beck Packhorse Bridge^{1}		Clow Beck	Possibly 15th-century; two segmental arches on differing alignments. Grade II listed. Carries public bridleway.
North Yorkshire	Danby; 54.4599°N 0.8916°W	Duck Bridge^{1}		River Esk	Ancient stone bridge over the River Esk, about 1 km North from Danby Castle.
North Yorkshire	Glaisdale; 54.4389°N 0.7921°W	Beggars Bridge^{2}		River Esk	1619; single segmental arch. Grade II* listed. Carries public footpath.
North Yorkshire	Hampsthwaite; 54.0236°N 1.6048°W	Cockhill Packhorse Bridge^{1}		Cockhill Beck	Probably 17th-century; single small semicircular arch. Grade II listed.
North Yorkshire	Hubberholme; 54.2049°N 2.1008°W	Crook Gill Bridge^{1}		Crook Gill	Single segmental arch.
North Yorkshire	Ivelet; 54.3756°N 2.1045°W	Ivelet Bridge^{2}		River Swale	Late 16th-century; single semicircular arch. Grade II* listed.
North Yorkshire	Knox nr Harrogate; 54.0150°N 1.5516°W	Knox or Spruisty Bridge^{1}		Oak Beck	17th- or 18th-century; single slightly pointed arch. Grade II listed.
North Yorkshire	Linton; 54.0607°N 2.0055°W	Redmayne Packhorse Bridge^{1}		Linton or Eller Beck	Late 17th- or early 18th-century; single shallow arch with additional flood arch. Grade II listed. Carries public byway alongside ford.
North Yorkshire	Norwood; 53.9535°N 1.7025°W	Dob Park Bridge^{1}		River Washburn	Probably early 17th-century; single segmental arch. Grade II listed. Carries public byway.
North Yorkshire	Pickering; 54.2274°N 0.7880°W	Ings Bridge^{1}		Pickering Beck	Probably early 19th-century; single segmental arch. Grade II listed. Adjacent to public road.
North Yorkshire	Ravenseat, Swaledale; 54.4256°N 2.2129°W	Ravenseat Bridge^{1}		Whitsundale Beck	18th-century; single segmental arch. Grade II listed. Carries farm access.
North Yorkshire	Romanby; 54.3360°N 1.4509°W	Packhorse Bridge^{1}		Willow Beck	16th-century, repaired 1621; single segmental arch. Grade II listed. Carries public footpath.
North Yorkshire	Skipton; 53.9610°N 2.0102°W	Skipton packhorse bridge		Wilderness Beck	Probably 17th-century; single arch. Grade II listed. Carries public footpath.
North Yorkshire	Sowerby; 54.2198°N 1.3339°W	Town End Bridge^{1}		Cod Beck	Also known as World's End Bridge. 1672; single segmental arch. Grade II listed. Carries public footpath.
North Yorkshire	Spofforth; 53.9585°N 1.4495°W	packhorse bridge		River Crimple	18th-century; single arch. Grade II listed.
North Yorkshire	Stokesley; 54.4692°N 1.1927°W	Taylorson's Bridge^{1}		River Leven	17th- or early 18th-century; single round arch. Grade II listed.
North Yorkshire	Thornthwaite; 54.0296°N 1.7361°W	Thornthwaite Packhorse Bridge^{1}		Fall or Padside or Darley Beck	Single segmental span. Scheduled monument.
North Yorkshire	Westerdale; 54.4464°N 0.9779°W	Hunter's Sty (Stee) Bridge^{2}		River Esk	13th-century, restored 1874; single round span. Scheduled monument. Carries public footpath.
North Yorkshire	Yockenthwaite; 54.2071°N 2.1477°W	Yockenthwaite Bridge^{2}		River Wharfe	Probably early 18th-century; single segmental arch. Grade II listed.
Nottinghamshire	Ratcliffe-on-Soar; 52.8681°N 1.2702°W	Red Hill Lock Bridge		River Soar (Loughborough Navigation)	Late 18th- or early 19th-century; single semicircular brick arch. Grade II listed. Although described as such in the official listing, this canal bridge is not a packhorse bridge by most accepted definitions.
Shropshire	Clun; 52.4204°N 3.0303°W	Clun Bridge		River Clun	Probably 16th-century; five segmental arches. Grade II listed. Carries A488 road.
Shropshire	Rushbury; 52.5197°N 2.7190°W	Rushbury Packhorse Bridge^{1}		Eaton Brook	17th-century; single segmental arch. Grade II listed. Carries public bridleway.
Somerset	Allerford; 51.2110°N 3.5688°W	Allerford Bridge^{1}		River Aller	Medieval; two segmental-headed arches. Grade II* listed, Scheduled monument. Adjoins public road through ford.
Somerset	Bruton; 51.1118°N 2.4534°W	Bow Bridge, Plox^{1}		River Brue	Possibly 15th-century; single-span. Grade I listed, Scheduled monument.
Somerset	Charterhouse; 51.2983°N 2.7210°W				17th- or 18th-century; single low segmental arch. Grade II listed.
Somerset	Chew Stoke; 51.3531°N 2.6360°W	packhorse bridge^{3}		Strode Brook	Two round arches.
Somerset	Chewton Keynsham; 51.3959°N 2.4978°W	Chewton Packhorse Bridge		River Chew	Early 18th-century; two segmental arches. Grade II listed, Scheduled monument. Carries public byway.
Somerset	Dowlish Wake; 50.9106°N 2.8893°W	Dowlish Wake Packhorse Bridge		Dowlish Brook	17th- or 18th-century rebuild of medieval bridge; four round arches (two inserted 1994–97 for flood relief purposes). Grade II listed. Carries public footpath alongside road.
Somerset	Dunster; 51.1792°N 3.4470°W	Gallox Bridge^{1}		River Avill	Possibly 15th-century; two round arches. Grade I listed, Scheduled monument. Carries public bridleway.
Somerset	Ilchester; 51.0077°N 2.7140°W	Pill Bridge^{1}		River Ivel	17th-century; three semicircular arches. Grade II listed, Scheduled monument. Carries public bridleway.
Somerset	Horner; 51.1985°N 3.5797°W	Hacketty Way Bridge^{1}		River Horner	Late medieval; single-span. Grade II* listed, Scheduled monument. Carries public bridleway.
Somerset	West Luccombe; 51.2035°N 3.5777°W	West Luccombe packhorse bridge		River Horner	Late medieval; single-span. Grade II* listed, Scheduled monument. Carries public footpath.
Somerset	Oare; 51.2159°N 3.7310°W	Malmsmead Bridge		Badgworthy Water	17th–18th-century; two rounded arches. Grade II listed. Carries public road.
Somerset	Oare; 51.2050°N 3.6904°W	Robber's Bridge		Weir Water	Carries public road.
Somerset	Queen Camel; 51.0229°N 2.5799°W	packhorse bridge^{1}		River Cam	Carries public footpath.
Somerset	Rode; 51.2842°N 2.2903°W	Scutt's Bridge^{1}		River Frome	Three semicircular arches. Grade II listed. Carries public footpath.
Somerset	Tellisford; 51.2996°N 2.2799°W	Tellisford Bridge^{2}		River Frome	Three semicircular arches. Grade II listed. Carries public footpath.
Somerset	Watchet; 51.1745°N 3.3486°W	Kentsford Bridge^{1}		Washford River	Probably late medieval; two segmental arches. Grade II listed. Carries public footpath.
Somerset	Wellow; 51.3213°N 2.3725°W	Wellow Bridge		Wellow Brook	Late medieval; two round arches. Grade II listed. Carries public footpath.
Somerset	Winsford; 51.1254°N 3.6201°W	Lyncombe Bridge		River Exe	17th- or 18th-century, possibly earlier. Grade II listed.
Somerset	Winsford; 51.1053°N 3.5644°W	Old Vicarage Bridge^{1}		River Exe	Medieval, restored 1952; two semicircular arches. Grade II listed. Carries public footpath, just upstream of 19th-century road bridge (also called Vicarage Bridge).
Somerset	Winsford; 51.1027°N 3.5646°W	packhorse bridge^{1}		Winn Brook	Medieval, restored 1952; single semicircular arch. Grade II listed.
South Yorkshire	Longshaw; 53.3291°N 1.6059°W	Burbage Brook Bridge^{1}		Burbage Brook	c. 1750; single segmental arch. Grade II listed. On open access moorland, near to Carl Wark.
South Yorkshire	Oxspring; 53.5195°N 1.5986°W	Willow Bridge^{1}		River Don	Probably 17th-century; single slightly pointed arch. Grade II listed. On public bridleway, part of the Trans-Pennine Trail.
South Yorkshire	Rivelin Valley; 53.3814°N 1.5622°W	packhorse bridge^{1}		River Rivelin	c. 1775; single elliptical arch. Grade II listed. In Country Park.
South Yorkshire	Wharncliffe Side; 53.4449°N 1.5615°W	Glen Howe Packhorse Bridge^{2}		Tinker Brook	Formerly New Mill Bridge. 1734; single elliptical arch. Grade II listed. In public park; resited during construction of Ewden Reservoir.
Staffordshire	Great Haywood; 52.8006°N 2.0086°W	Essex Bridge^{1}		River Trent	Probably 16th-century; fourteen round arches. Described as "perhaps the least altered old bridge in the county" and "the longest packhorse bridge in the country". Grade I listed, Scheduled monument. Carries public bridleway.
Staffordshire	Tamworth; 52.631°N 1.689°W	The Old Bolebridge		River Anker	No longer extant; demolished c.1878–79.
Staffordshire	Wetton, Staffordshire; 53.1020°N 1.8592°W	Wetton or Wettonmill Bridge		River Manifold	Early 19th-century; four semicircular arches with triangular section buttresses. Described as a packhorse bridge by English Heritage, though perhaps more accurately a cart bridge. Carries public byway.
Suffolk	Cavenham; 52.2958°N 0.5886°E	Stone Bridge^{2}		tributary of River Lark	Probably 16th-century; single segmental brick arch. Grade II listed. Adjacent to public road.
Suffolk	Moulton; 52.2528°N 0.4855°E	Moulton Packhorse Bridge^{1}		River Kennett	ca. 1446 with 18th-century alterations; four pointed arches. Grade II* listed, Scheduled monument. Carries public footpath.
Surrey	Ewell; 51.3596°N 0.2637°W	The Packhorse Bridge		Hogsmill River	18th-century; single semicircular brick arch. Grade II listed.
Surrey	Gomshall; 51.2206°N 0.4490°W			River Tillingbourne	15th-century; three arches. Grade II listed.
Warwickshire	Shustoke; 52.5165°N 1.6904°W	Blyth Hall Packhorse Bridge		River Blythe	18th-century; three semicircular arches. Grade II listed.
West Midlands	Hampton-in-Arden; 52.4186°N 1.6878°W	Hampton in Arden packhorse bridge^{2}		River Blythe	15th-century; three stone and two brick arches. Grade II* listed, Scheduled monument.
West Yorkshire	Bingley; 53.8422°N 1.8418°W	Beckfoot Bridge^{1}		Harden Beck	c.1723; single-span. Grade II listed. Carries public footpath.
West Yorkshire	Clayton West; 53.6010°N 1.6074°W	Park Mill Bridge^{1}		River Dearne	Probably 18th-century; single-span. Grade II listed. Carries public right-of-way.
West Yorkshire	Colden; 53.7531°N 2.0633°W	Strines Bridge^{1}		Colden Water	Possibly 17th-century; single segmental arch. Grade II listed. Carries public footpath; contra Hinchliffe, the English Heritage listing calls it a "fine graceful example of the packhorse type of bridge, but which having steps was probably only ever used as a foot-bridge...."
West Yorkshire	Goose Eye; 53.8605°N 1.9734°W			Dean Beck	Date unknown; single arch. Grade II listed. Adjacent to clapper bridge; carries public bridleway.
West Yorkshire	Haworth; 53.8343°N 1.9704°W	Long Bridge^{1}		River Worth	Date uncertain; single-span. Grade II listed. Carries public footpath.
West Yorkshire	Hebden Bridge; 53.7420°N 2.0133°W	The Old Bridge^{2}		Hebden Water	Also known as Hepton Brig. c.1510; three segmental arches. Grade II* listed. Carries public right-of-way.
West Yorkshire	Loxley; 53.4015°N 1.5505°W			River Loxley	Probably 18th-century, restored 1864. Grade II listed.
West Yorkshire	Marsden; 53.6055°N 1.9580°W	Close Gate Bridge^{1}		Haigh Clough	17th- or 18th-century; single-span. Grade II* listed.
West Yorkshire	Marsden; 53.6017°N 1.9304°W	Mellor Bridge^{1}		River Colne	17th- or 18th-century; single-span. Grade II* listed. Carries public footpath.
West Yorkshire	Meanwood; 53.8212°N 1.5613°W			Meanwood Beck	Early 18th-century. Grade II listed, "a rare survival of a pack-horse bridge sited within a suburban setting".
West Yorkshire	Oxenhope; 53.8201°N 1.9465°W	North Ives or Donkey Bridge^{1}		Bridgehouse Beck	Date uncertain; single steeply arched span. Grade II listed. Carries public footpath.
West Yorkshire	Rishworth Moor; 53.6389°N 1.9938°W	Oxygrains Old Bridge^{2}		Oxygrains Clough	Probably early 17th-century; single-span. Scheduled monument. On Access Land.
West Yorkshire	Ripponden; 53.6745°N 1.9399°W	Waterloo or Ripponden Old Bridge^{2}		River Ryburn	1752; single-span. Grade II* listed, Scheduled monument. Public road.
West Yorkshire	Stanbury; 53.8342°N 1.9784°W	Lumbfoot Bridge^{1}		River Worth	Date uncertain; single-span. Grade II listed. Carries public footpath.
West Yorkshire	Wakefield; 53.6759°N 1.4895°W	Little Bridge^{1}		River Calder	Probably 18th-century; three elliptical arches. Grade II listed.
West Yorkshire	Wadsworth; 53.7791°N 2.0130°W	Lumb Bridge^{1}		Crimsworth Dean Beck	Probably early 18th-century; single-span. Grade II listed. Carries public bridleway.
Wiltshire	Coombe Bissett; 51.0368°N 1.8461°W	packhorse bridge^{2}		River Ebble	Medieval, widened in the 19th century; three low two-centred arches. Grade II listed. Carries public footpath.
Wiltshire	Melksham; 51.3577°N 2.1708°W	packhorse bridge^{1}		River Avon	1725; four segmental arches. Grade II listed. Carries public footpath.
Worcestershire	Astley; 52.3028°N 2.3112°W	New Bridge		Dick Brook	Late 18th- or early 19th-century, possibly earlier, single arch. Grade II listed. Carries public bridleway.
Worcestershire	Shell; 52.2352°N 2.0729°W	Shell Packhorse Bridge^{1}		Bow Brook	17th-century or earlier, two round arches. Grade II listed. Adjacent to ford on public road.

=== Isle of Man ===
County	Location	Name	Photograph	Crosses	Notes
Isle of Man	Ballasalla; 54.1020°N 4.6313°W	Crossag or Monks' Bridge		Silver Burn	c. 1350; two slightly pointed arches. "It is believed to be the best example of [a] medieval bridge in the British Isles."

=== Scotland ===
County	Location	Name	Photograph	Crosses	Notes
Borders	Stow of Wedale; 55.69°N 2.8629°W	Stow Old Bridge		Gala Water	1655; three segmental arches. Grade B listed.
Highland	Carrbridge; 57.283889°N 3.815556°W	Carrbridge Packhorse Bridge		River Dulnain	1717; slender arch. Category B listed.
Fife	Coaltown of Balgonie; 56.1726°N 3.1166°W	Barrel Brig		River Ore, Fife	Early 18th century; double-span with cutwaters. Grade B listed, Scheduled monument.
Highland	John o' Groats; 58.6430°N 3.0853°W			Huna Burn	1651; single-span. Grade B listed.
South Lanarkshire	East Kilbride; 55.7295°N 4.2271°W	Craig Mill Packhorse Bridge		White Cart Water	Single-span. Grade B listed.

=== Wales ===
County	Location	Name	Photograph	Crosses	Notes
Blaenau Gwent	Aberbeeg; 51.7101°N 3.1442°W	Aberbeeg Packhorse Bridge		Ebbw Fach River	Grade II listed.
Conwy	Penmachno; 53.0599°N 3.7807°W	Roman Bridge		River Machno	Grade II listed.
Flintshire	Caergwrle; 53.1109°N 3.0367°W	Caergwrle Packhorse Bridge		River Alyn	Mid-17th-century; "one of the finest examples in Wales". Grade II listed.
Flintshire	Ffrith; 53.0901°N 3.0657°W	Ffrith Bridge		River Cegidog	Probably 18th-century; single-span. Grade II listed, Scheduled monument.
Gwynedd	Dyffryn Ardudwy; 52.7919°N 4.0253°W	Pont Scethin		Afon Ysgethin	Probably 18th-century; single arch. Scheduled monument.
Gwynedd	Minllyn; 52.71078°N 3.689135°W	Pont Minllyn		River Dovey	Probably 17th-century; two segmental arches. Grade II listed, Scheduled monument.
Powys	Llangenny; 51.8636°N 3.1067°W			Grwyne Fawr	Grade II listed.
Swansea	Cheriton; 51.6111°N 4.2262°W	Kittlehill Packhorse Bridge		Burry Pill	Grade II listed.
