= Glenthorne (disambiguation) =

Glenthorne is a geological site of interest within Exmoor Park, England.

Glenthorne may also refer to:

- Glenthorne Estate, in the Adelaide suburb of O'Halloran Hill, South Australia
- Glenthorne High School, Sutton, England
- Glenthorne National Park–Ityamaiitpinna Yarta, a national park in South Australia
- Glenthorne, New South Wales, in the Mid-Coast Council local government area, Australia
- Glenthorne Youth Treatment Centre, a former youth detention centre in Birches Green, Birmingham, England
