= St Mary's Church, Luccombe =

Church in Somerset, England

Church of St Mary
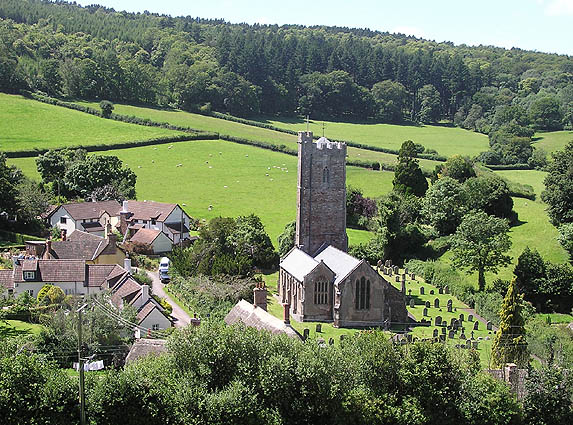

- Location within Somerset

General information
- Location: Luccombe, England
- Coordinates: 51.1894°N 3.5593°W
- Completed: c 1450

The parish Church of St Mary in Luccombe, Somerset, England has a chancel dating from about 1300, with the nave and tower being added around 1450. It has been designated as a Grade I listed building.

It was built by John Maris of Stogursey. The chancel is the earliest part of the church dating from around 1300. In 1530 the aisle was added, and in 1752-1756 a gallery added which was removed in 1840 when the church was further restored and the vestry added.

== Architecture ==
The parish church of St Mary had its origins in around 1300 when the chancel was built. The nave and tower date from around 1450, and the aisle was added in about 1530. A gallery was installed between 1752 and 1756, but this was removed when the church was restored in 1840, at which time the vestry was added. The building is constructed of roughcast stone, except for the vestry which is squared red sandstone, and the tower which is random rubble red sandstone. The roofs are slated. The plan consists of a four-bay nave and a four-bay south aisle, a chancel, a northeast vestry, a north porch and a west tower. The tower is built in three stages and topped with crenellations. It has gargoyles and string courses, but no buttresses. The tower houses a ring of six bells of which five were cast in 1759. The interior of the church is whitewashed with a barrel-vaulted roof, and a Perpendicular-style pointed tower arch. The interior includes a Jacobean pulpit and chair and a medieval rood screen.

The Anglican parish is part of the benefice of Porlock and Porlock Weir with Stoke Pero, Selworthy and Luccombe within the archdeaconry of Taunton.

== See also ==
- Grade I listed buildings in West Somerset
- List of Somerset towers
- List of ecclesiastical parishes in the Diocese of Bath and Wells
