= Culbone Stone =

Mediaeval standing stone

Coordinates: 51.213187°N 3.673883°W

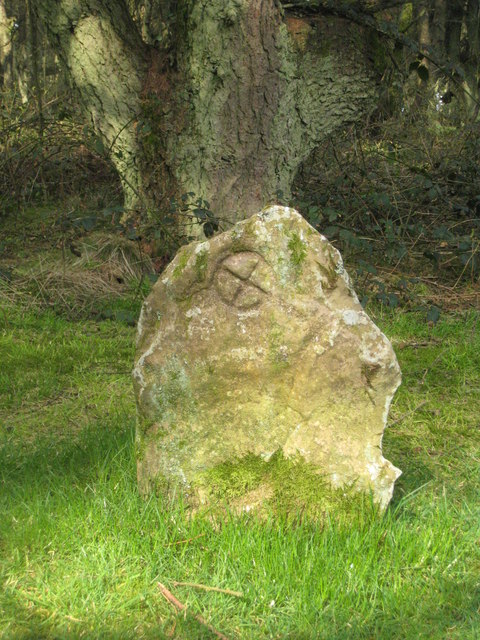
The Culbone Stone showing the incised cross

The Culbone Stone, an early mediaeval standing stone, is close to Culbone in the English county of Somerset. The stone is made from Hangman grit, a local sandstone, and has a wheeled ring cross carved into it. The stone has been scheduled as an ancient monument.

== Location and description ==
The stone lies in woodland close to the boundary between Oare and Porlock on a permissive path through private land. It is approximately 3 feet (0.91 m) in height and 20 inches (510 mm) wide with a maximum depth of 8 inches (200 mm).

It is made of Hangman grit a local sandstone which represents the Middle Devonian sequence of North Devon and Somerset. The unusual freshwater deposits in the Hangman Grits were mainly formed in desert conditions.

At the top of the stone is an incised wheeled ring cross, with a diameter of 0.11 metres (4.3 in) which is a Christian symbol, the style of which suggests it dates from 7th to 9th century. One arm of the cross at the lower right extends out of the circle. A slightly earlier date of the 6th or 7th century has also been suggested.

== History ==
The stone was discovered recumbent in 1939 or 1940 and placed upright at the location in which it was found. It has been suggested that the stone has been moved from its original site as part of the nearby Culbone Hill Stone Row. One of the stones in the row also has an inscribed cross.

== See also ==
- List of individual rocks
