= Aldbrough Beck =

Stream in North Yorkshire, England

Coordinates: 54.487639°N 1.566060°W

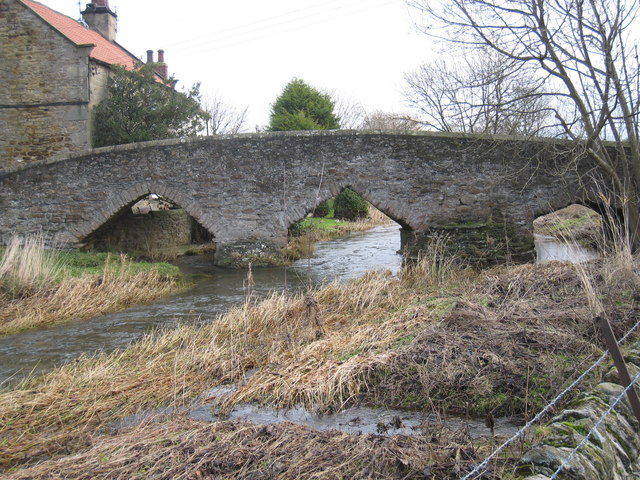
Packhorse Bridge over Aldbrough Beck

Aldbrough Beck is a small beck in North Yorkshire, England.

The beck starts near Eppleby, in the Richmondshire district, and flows southeast, joining the Mary Wild Beck. It passes under a packhorse bridge while passing through Aldbrough St John. One mile further on the stream becomes known as Clow Beck and flows seven miles more, joining the River Tees near Croft-on-Tees.
