= Garratts Wood =

- Location within Somerset
- Interactive map of Garratts Wood

Geography
- Location: Somerset, England
- OS grid: SS902351
- Coordinates: 51.105°N 3.568°W
- Area: 1.11 hectares (2.74 acres)

Garratts Wood is a woodland in Somerset, England, near the village of Winsford. It covers a total area of 1.11 hectares (2.74 acres). It is owned and managed by the Woodland Trust.
