= Grabbist Hillfort =

Iron Age hillfort in Somerset, England

- Grabbist hillfort shown within Somerset
- 51.18318°N 3.456454°W
- Location: Somerset, England

History
- Built: During the Iron Age

Site notes
- Architectural style: British pre-Roman Architecture

Scheduled monument
- Official name: Hillfort on Grabbist Hill, 275m south west of St Leonard's Well
- Designated: 11 August 2003
- Reference no.: 1021060

Grabbist Hillfort is an Iron Age oval hillfort or defended enclosure, west of Dunster in Somerset, England.

The site is 885.8 feet (270.0 m) long and 219.8 feet (67.0 m) wide, and is surrounded by a counterscarp, which measures 4.2 to 6.2 feet (1.3 to 1.9 m) in height. It is also surrounded by a ditch, which ranges up to 32.8 feet (10.0 m) wide and 7.2 feet (2.2 m) deep. The bank has a peak height of 9.8 feet (3 m), and, on the northern and western sides, there is a second bank, which leads to the northeastern corner being the most strongly defended. Ploughing over the years has damaged or erased some of the original features including a possible inner rampart. If it was a hillfort it is believed to be unfinished.

An area just below the site is known as the "Giant's Chair" which is a depression formed by land slippage.

The site is designated as a scheduled monument.
