= Luccombe, Somerset =

Village in Somerset, England

Coordinates: 51.1895°N 3.5593°W

Luccombe
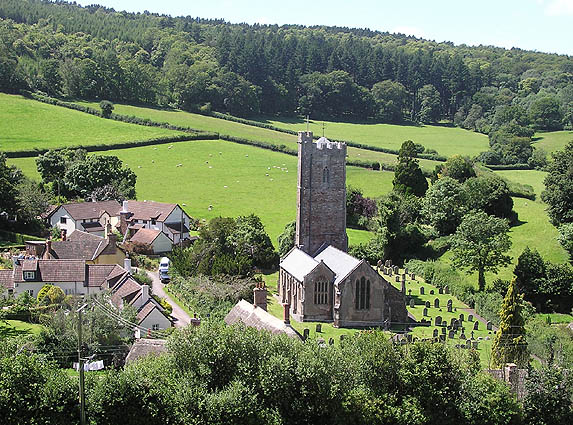
- Church of St Mary

- Location within Somerset
- Population: 157 (2011)
- OS grid reference: SS910445
- Unitary authority: Somerset Council
- Ceremonial county: Somerset
- Region: South West
- Country: England
- Sovereign state: United Kingdom
- Post town: MINEHEAD
- Postcode district: TA24
- Dialling code: 01643
- Police: Avon and Somerset
- Fire: Devon and Somerset
- Ambulance: South Western
- UK Parliament: Tiverton and Minehead

Luccombe or Luckham is a village and civil parish in the Exmoor National Park in the English county of Somerset. It at the foot of the moor's highest hill, the 1,750 feet (533 m) Dunkery Beacon, and is about one mile south of the A39 road between Porlock and Minehead. The parish includes the hamlets of Stoke Pero and Horner, as well as the former hamlet of Wilmersham.

== History ==
The name Luccombe is believed to mean either Lufa's valley or valley where the counting was done. Locumbe in the 1086 Domesday Book.

There is evidence of Iron Age field systems on the top of Great Hill, and the Sweetworthy Iron Age hill fort.

At the time of the Domesday Book in 1086 East Luccombe was held by Ralph de Limesy passing by the 13th century to the Luccombe family, and later to the Arundell family. Along with West Luccombe these passed to the Acland family.

Luccombe was part of the hundred of Carhampton.

In 1944 Sir Richard Acland gave the Holnicote Estate, which includes Luccombe, to the National Trust.

In 1944 Luccombe was the subject of a study by Mass-Observation: the only entirely rural project the government-funded social research organisation ever conducted. The results were later published in W.J. Turner's 1947 book, Exmoor Village. The village at the time was reported to comprise 24 cottages, with 51 adults and 23 children living in them.

Luccombe used to be the location of the annual St Albans Cathedral Choir Camp, which celebrated its 50th anniversary in 2008.

=== Horner ===
Horner is on the eastern bank of Horner Water on which there is a restored, but non-working, water mill and which is crossed by a packhorse bridge, and on the route of the Coleridge Way. Horner possesses two tearooms and a campsite field owned by the Scout Association. Burrowhayes Farm is a nearby campsite that shares its patronage with the tearooms.

=== Stoke Pero ===
Stoke Pero was an ancient parish in the hundred of Carhampton. In the Domesday Book it was mentioned as Stoche. It became a civil parish in 1866, but in 1933 the parish was abolished and absorbed into the parish of Luccombe.

=== Wilmersham ===
Wilmersham (or Wilmotsham) was a small hamlet in Stoke Pero.

== Governance ==
The parish council has responsibility for local issues, including setting an annual precept (local rate) to cover the council's operating costs and producing annual accounts for public scrutiny. The parish council evaluates local planning applications and works with the local police, district council officers, and neighbourhood watch groups on matters of crime, security, and traffic. The parish council's role also includes initiating projects for the maintenance and repair of parish facilities, as well as consulting with the district council on the maintenance, repair, and improvement of highways, drainage, footpaths, public transport, and street cleaning. Conservation matters (including trees and listed buildings) and environmental issues are also the responsibility of the council.

For local government purposes, since 1 April 2023, the parish comes under the unitary authority of Somerset Council. Prior to this, it was part of the non-metropolitan district of Somerset West and Taunton (formed on 1 April 2019) and, before this, the district of West Somerset (established under the Local Government Act 1972). It was part of Williton Rural District before 1974.

As Luccombe falls within the Exmoor National Park some functions normally administered by district or county councils have, since 1997, fallen under the Exmoor National Park Authority, which is known as a 'single purpose' authority, which aims to "conserve and enhance the natural beauty, wildlife and cultural heritage of the National Parks" and "promote opportunities for the understanding and enjoyment of the special qualities of the Parks by the public", including responsibility for the conservation of the historic environment.

It is also part of the Tiverton and Minehead county constituency represented in the House of Commons of the Parliament of the United Kingdom. It elects one Member of Parliament (MP) by the first past the post system of election.

== Landmarks ==
There are two medieval packhorse bridges. One is known as Hacketty Way Bridge, which is 50 inches (1,300 mm) wide and has a span of 18 feet (5.5 m). The other at West Luccombe has a shallow pointed arch. The cobbled roadway is 39 inches (990 mm) wide and has a span of 15 feet (4.6 m).

== Religious sites ==
The parish Church of St Mary has a chancel dating from about 1300, with the nave and tower being added around 1450. In 1530 the aisle was added, and in 1752–1756 a gallery added which was removed in 1840 when the church was further restored and the vestry added. It has been designated as a grade I listed building.

Stoke Pero Church has a 13th-century tower.
