= Lanacombe =

Area of Exmoor in Somerset, England

Coordinates: 51.1733°N 3.7375°W

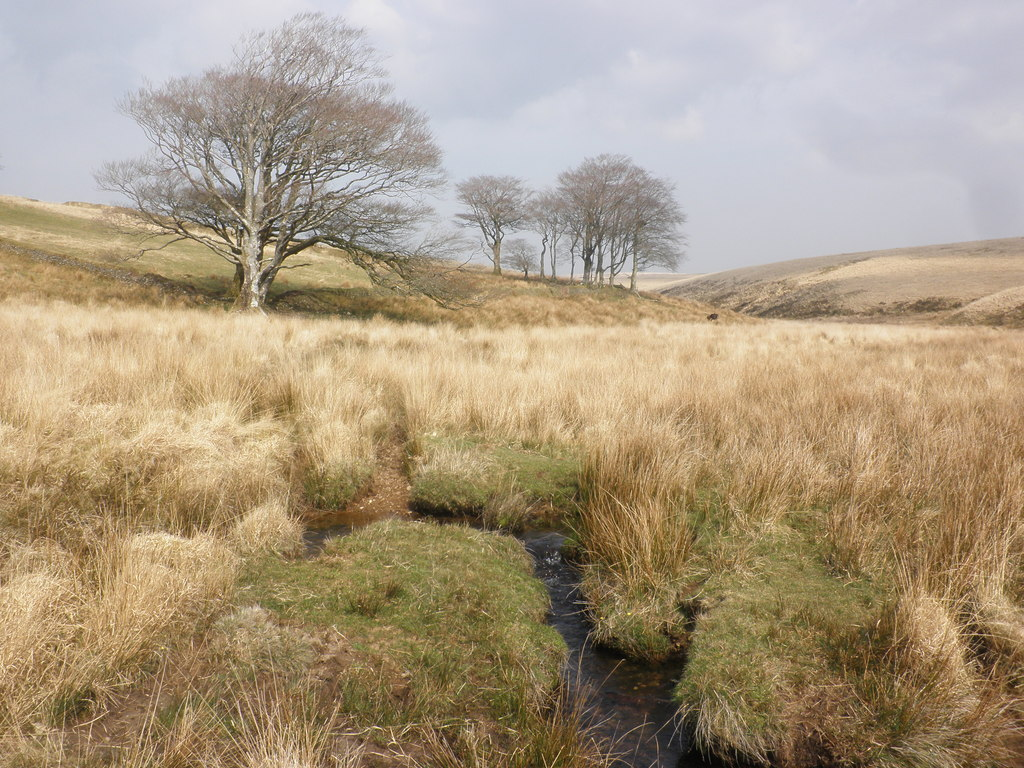
Lanacombe

Lanacombe is an area of Exmoor in Somerset, South West England. It is the site of several standing stones and cairns which have been scheduled as ancient monuments.

The stone settings are between 0.3 metres (1 ft 0 in) and 0.65 metres (2 ft 2 in) high. A series of Bronze Age stone cairns are closely associated with the standing stones.

Geophysical surveys undertaken since 2005 have shown that the stones were surrounded by wooden posts, and platforms and a circular high-resistance anomaly of uncertain date.
