= Oldberry Castle =

Iron Age hillfort in Somerset, England

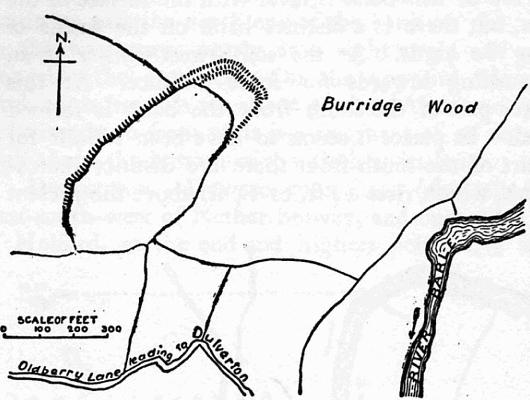
- Plan of the site

- Location within Somerset
- 51°02′36″N 3°33′30″W
- Location: Dulverton, Somerset, England

History
- Built: Iron Age

Scheduled monument
- Official name: Oldbury (or Oldberry) Castle
- Reference no.: 33542

Oldberry Castle (sometimes called Oldbury Castle) is an Iron Age hill fort north west of Dulverton, Somerset, England. It lies approximately 0.5 miles (0.80 km) north-west from Dulverton, close to the Devon border. It has been designated as a Scheduled Ancient Monument.

The site overlooks the town and the ancient crossing point of the River Barle. It is an irregular oval shape measuring 720 feet (220 m) by 300 feet (91 m). It is defended by a bank measuring 10 feet (3.0 m) wide and 6 feet (1.8 m) high, and a 18 feet (5.5 m) wide ditch.

== Background ==
Hill forts developed in the Late Bronze and Early Iron Age, roughly at the start of the first millennium BC. The reason for their emergence in Britain, and their purpose, has been a subject of debate. It has been argued that they could have been military sites constructed in response to invasion from continental Europe, sites built by invaders, or a military reaction to social tensions caused by an increasing population and consequent pressure on agriculture. The dominant view since the 1960s has been that the increasing use of iron led to social changes in Britain. Deposits of iron ore were located in different places to the tin and copper ore necessary to make bronze, and as a result trading patterns shifted and the old elites lost their economic and social status. Power passed into the hands of a new group of people. Archaeologist Barry Cunliffe believes that population increase still played a role and has stated "[the forts] provided defensive possibilities for the community at those times when the stress [of an increasing population] burst out into open warfare. But I wouldn't see them as having been built because there was a state of war. They would be functional as defensive strongholds when there were tensions and undoubtedly some of them were attacked and destroyed, but this was not the only, or even the most significant, factor in their construction".

== See also ==
- List of hill forts and ancient settlements in Somerset
