= Long Wood Enclosure =

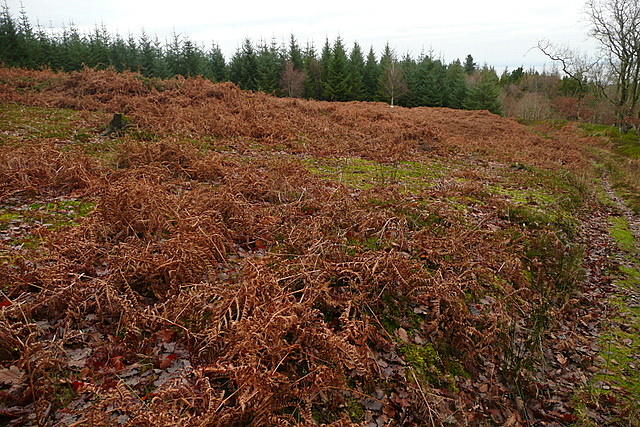

- Location within Somerset
- 51.169223°N 3.458025°W
- Location: Dunster, Somerset, England

History
- Built: Bronze Age – Iron Age

Scheduled monument
- Official name: Later prehistoric defended enclosure, Long Wood
- Designated: 12 April 1994
- Reference no.: 1008255

Long Wood Enclosure is an enclosure which may have been a univallate Iron Age hill fort in the county of Somerset, England. The hill fort is approximately 3.5 kilometres (2.2 mi) southwest of the village of Dunster. It has been scheduled as an ancient monument.

The enclosure is approximately 40 metres (130 ft) in diameter and covers around 0.15 hectares (0.37 acres). It is surrounded by a bank and ditches about 6.5 metres (21 ft) wide and 1.9 metres (6 ft 3 in) high. The original entrance will likely be a break in the bank opposite a causeway on the uphill southwesterly side. The hill fort has been damaged in recent years due to forestry plantation.

== Background ==
Hill forts developed in the Late Bronze and Early Iron Age, roughly the start of the first millennium BC. The reason for their emergence in Britain and their purpose have been debated. It has been argued that they could have been military sites constructed in response to invasion from continental Europe, sites built by invaders, or a military reaction to social tensions caused by an increasing population and consequent pressure on agriculture. The dominant view since the 1960s has been that the increasing use of iron led to social changes in Britain. Iron ore deposits were located in different places, such as the tin and copper ore necessary to make bronze. As a result, trading patterns shifted, and the old elites lost their economic and social status. Power passed into the hands of a new group of people. The archaeologist Barry Cunliffe believes that population increase still played a role and has said, "[the forts] provided defensive possibilities for the community at those times when the stress [of an increasing population] burst out into open warfare. But I wouldn't see them as having been built because there was a state of war. They would be functional as defensive strongholds when tensions, and undoubtedly some were attacked and destroyed; however, this was not the only or even the most significant factor in their construction."

== See also ==
- List of hill forts and ancient settlements in Somerset
