= Sweetworthy =

Site of two Iron Age hillforts in Somerset, England

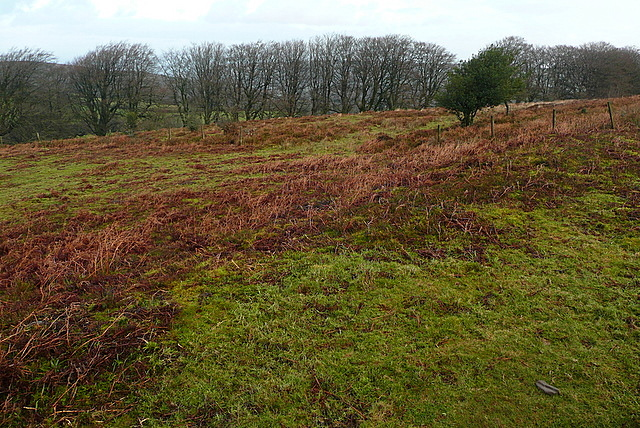
- Enclosure at Sweetworthy

- Location within Somerset
- 51°10′17″N 3°35′25″W
- Location: Porlock, Somerset, England

History
- Built: Iron Age

Site notes
- Area: 0.25 hectares (0.62 acres)

Scheduled monument
- Official name: Sweetworthy deserted medieval settlement
- Designated: 13 July 1994
- Reference no.: 1008469

Sweetworthy is the site of two Iron Age hill forts or enclosures at Luccombe, 4 kilometres (2 mi) south of Porlock, Somerset, England. They are on the north-facing slope of Dunkery Hill. One has a single rampart and external ditch, enclosing 0.25 hectares (0.62 acres). The rampart is still visible and the ditch on the east side is used as a trackway. There was a defended settlement above the main site.

It is also the site of a deserted medieval settlement, which has been designated as a scheduled monument. It has been added to the Heritage at Risk Register because of the vulnerability to plant growth.

== Background ==
Hillforts developed in the Late Bronze and Early Iron Age, roughly the start of the first millennium BC. The reason for their emergence in Britain, and their purpose, has been a subject of debate. It has been argued that they could have been military sites constructed in response to invasion from continental Europe, sites built by invaders, or a military reaction to social tensions caused by an increasing population and consequent pressure on agriculture. The dominant view since the 1960s has been that the increasing use of iron led to social changes in Britain. Deposits of iron ore were located in different places to the tin and copper ore necessary to make bronze, and as a result trading patterns shifted and the old elites lost their economic and social status. Power passed into the hands of a new group of people. Archaeologist Barry Cunliffe believes that population increase still played a role and has stated "[the forts] provided defensive possibilities for the community at those times when the stress [of an increasing population] burst out into open warfare. But I wouldn't see them as having been built because there was a state of war. They would be functional as defensive strongholds when there were tensions and undoubtedly some of them were attacked and destroyed, but this was not the only, or even the most significant, factor in their construction".

== See also ==
- List of hillforts and ancient settlements in Somerset
