= Glenthorne =

Site of Special Scientific Interest

- Site of Special Scientific Interest
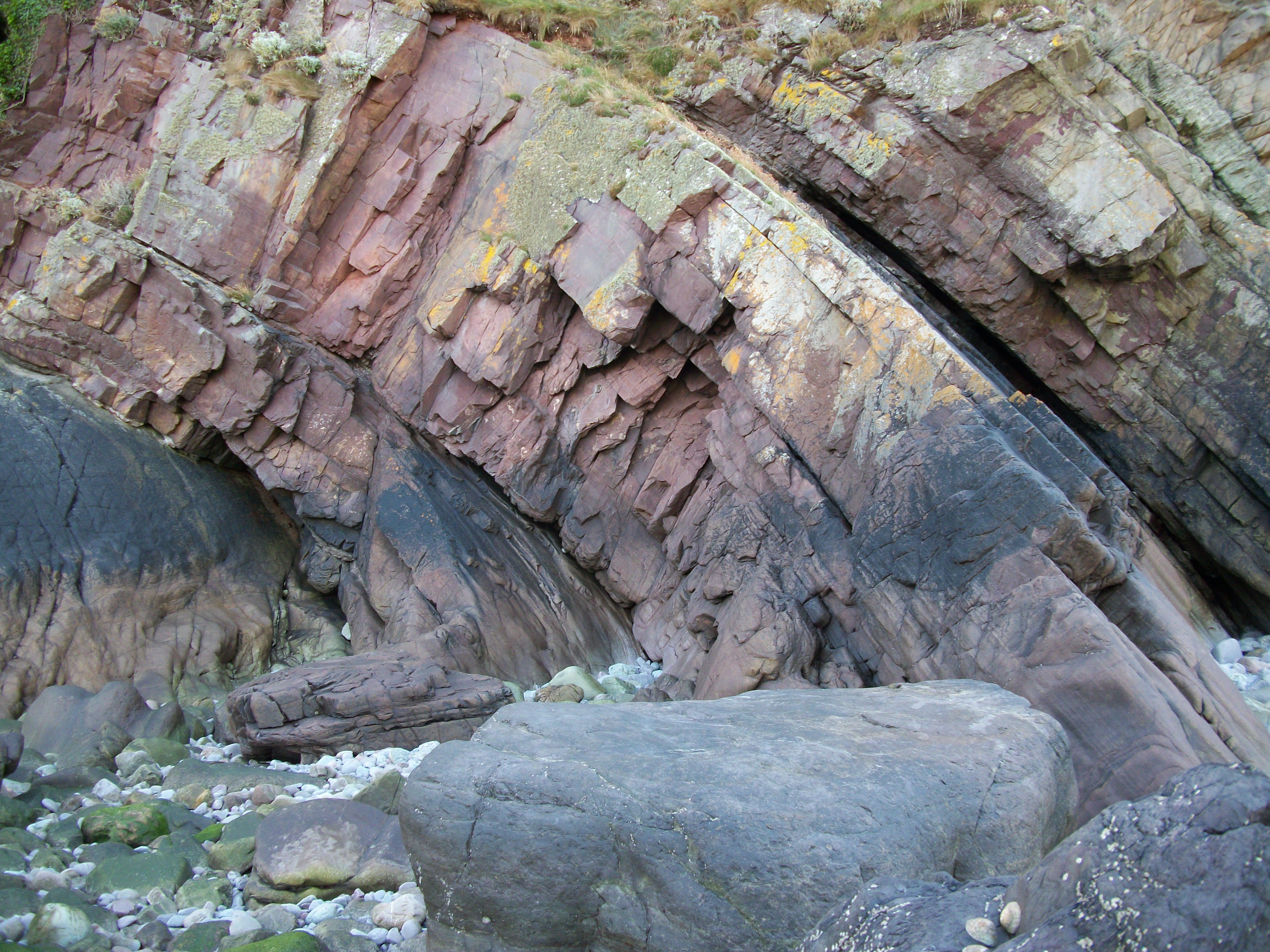

- Location within Somerset
- Location of Glenthorne.
- Area of search: Somerset & Devon
- Grid reference: SS800497
- Coordinates: 51.23383°N 3.72018°W
- Interest: Geological
- Area: 13.3 hectares (0.133 km^{2}; 0.051 sq mi)
- Notification date: 1989

Glenthorne (grid reference SS800497) is a 13.3-hectare (33-acre) geological Site of Special Scientific Interest in the parish of Oare within the Exmoor National Park, on the border of Somerset and Devon, notified in 1989.

Glenthorne is a Geological Conservation Review site because of the Trentishoe Formation of the Hangman Sandstone Group. The Hangman Sandstone represents the Middle Devonian sequence of North Devon and Somerset. These are unusual freshwater deposits in the Hangman Grits, which were mainly formed in desert conditions.
