= Battlegore Burial Chamber =

Bronze Age burial chamber in England

- Battlegore Burial Chamber shown within Somerset
- 51°9′58.04″N 3°19′32.74″W
- Location: Williton, Somerset, England

History
- Built: During the Bronze Age

Site notes
- Architectural style: British pre-Roman Architecture

Scheduled monument
- Official name: Battlegore Burial Chamber
- Designated: 14 March 2000
- Reference no.: 33704

Battlegore Burial Chamber is a Bronze Age burial chamber located in Williton, Somerset. It is composed of three round barrows and possibly a long, chambered barrow. The site was excavated in 1931 by George Gray. The name "Battlegore" comes from this site being attributed to the location of a Danish raid in 918 AD or 988 AD. At least as early as the 14th century, the site was referred to as "Bytelgore", a predecessor of the word "Battlegore". Along with three nearby round barrows it has been scheduled as an ancient monument.

== Description ==
The most northernly of the barrows is around 18 metres (59 ft) in diameter and 1 metre (3.3 ft) high. It is partially surrounded by a shallow ditch with a radius of 45 metres (148 ft). 20 metres (66 ft) east of this barrow is a small mound about 6.5 metres (21 ft) wide and 25 centimetres (9.8 in) high. Gray found four other mounds in addition to this small one, but he was unable to find anything that would indicate the importance of these small mounds. A large urn, found 6.1 metres (20 ft) to the east of the center of the barrow, contained the cremated remains of a human.

Just south of this is another one of the three major round barrows, and it was around 2.4 metres (8 ft) high as of 1969. Between this and the southernmost of the three major barrows is a ring ditch, which might be another barrow. The final, southernmost barrow is around 27 metres (89 ft) in diameter and 1.8 metres (5.9 ft) in height. Unlike the previous barrow, this one has not been ploughed, and as such it is in better condition.

The chambered barrow is composed of three stones. The largest is 3.1 metres (10 ft) long, 1.2 metres (3.9 ft) wide, and .7 metres (2.3 ft) deep; the second-largest is 1.6 metres (5.2 ft) long, .8 metres (2.6 ft) wide, and .5 metres (1.6 ft) deep; and the smallest is 1 metre (3.3 ft) long, .5 metres (1.6 ft) wide, and .3 metres (0.98 ft) deep. According to legend, the devil and a giant's quarrel caused these stones to be thrown there.

== Artifacts ==
Neolithic pottery and flint artifacts have been found at this site. Archaeologists also found bronze items, including a "knife dagger", a broken dagger, a rapier, a spearhead, and a winged axe. A field of Mesolithic flint artifacts has been found to the north of Battlegore.

== See also ==
- Bronze Age Britain
- Neolithic British Isles
