= Robber's Bridge =

Arch bridge in Somerset, England

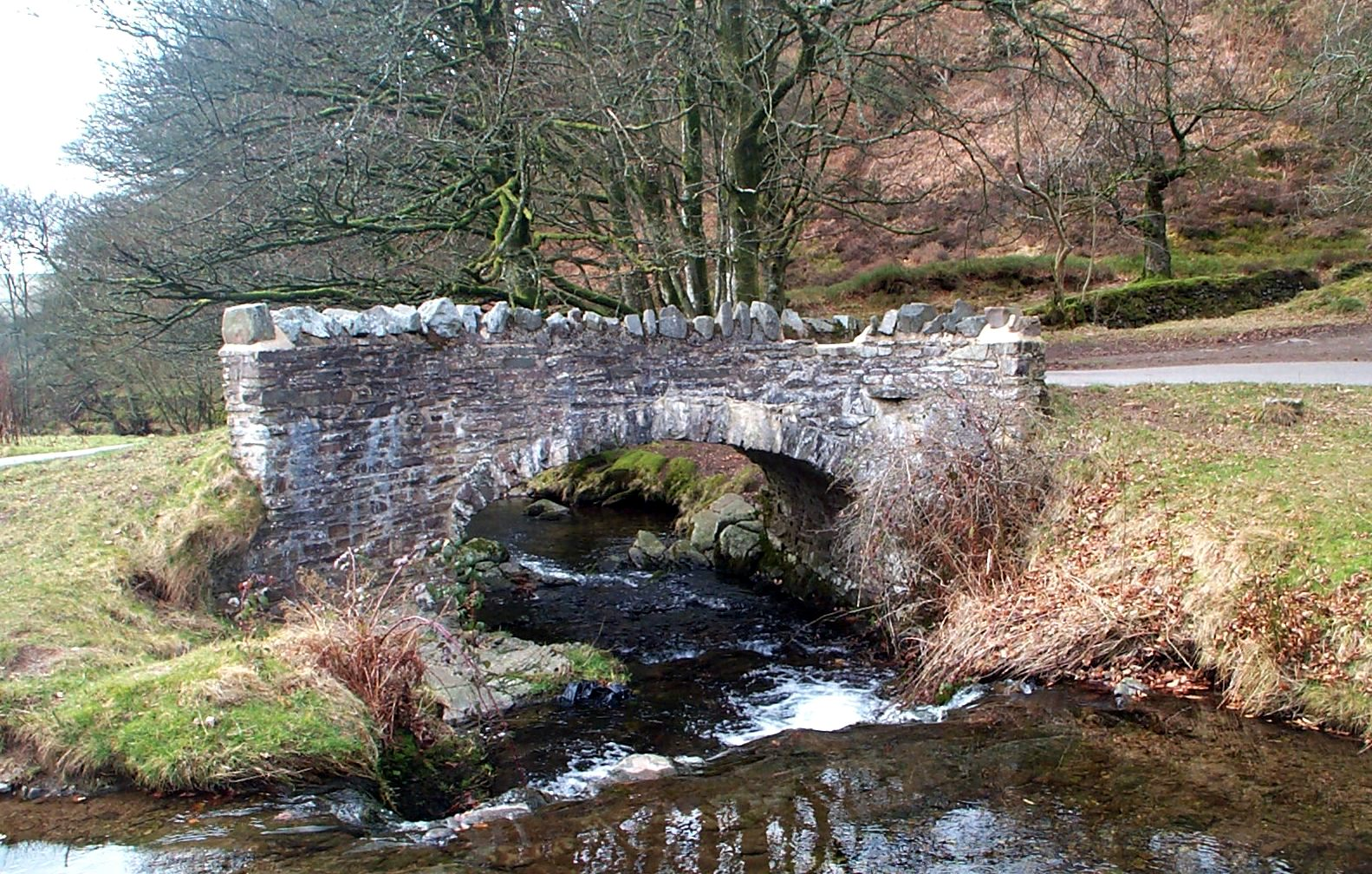
- Coordinates: 51.205°N 3.690°W
- Crosses: Weir Water
- Other name(s): Robbers Bridge

Characteristics
- Material: Granite
- Width: 2.27 m
- Longest span: 3.5 m

Robber's Bridge, or Robbers Bridge, is an old masonry arch bridge in the royal forest of Exmoor near Doone Valley, carrying the minor road from Porlock Hill to Oare. It crosses Weir Water and is located down a steep, wooded lane beneath overhanging trees.

Some consider it to be a popular picnic spot, accessible via a narrow, steep, and winding road. In addition, from the nearby carpark, the bridge provides access to a grassland considered suitable for picnicking.

== Association with Lorna Doone ==
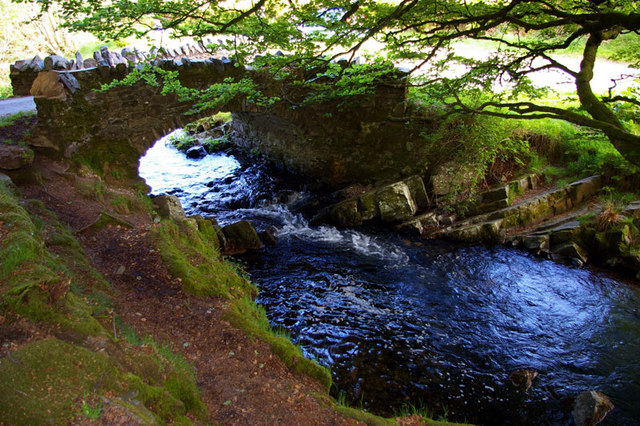
A view of the bridge looking upstream

The bridge takes its name from the fact that much of this area was dangerous bandit country in past centuries. R.D. Blackmore drew on the history and legends of this area to create his world-famous novel Lorna Doone.
