= Winsford, Somerset =

Village and civil parish in Somerset, England

Coordinates: 51.0993°N 3.5652°W

Winsford
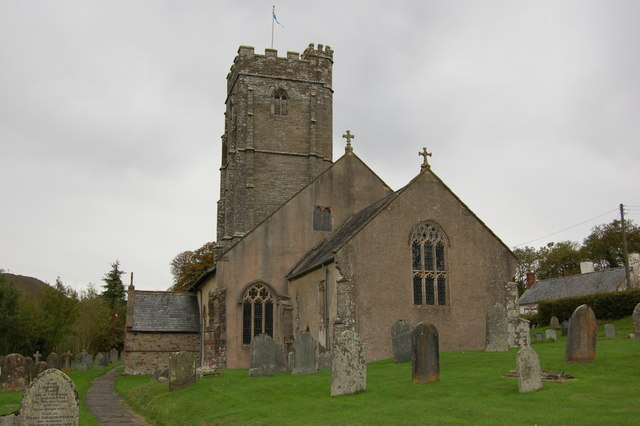
- Winsford church

- Location within Somerset
- Population: 321 (2011)
- OS grid reference: SS905345
- Unitary authority: Somerset Council
- Ceremonial county: Somerset
- Region: South West
- Country: England
- Sovereign state: United Kingdom
- Post town: Minehead
- Postcode district: TA24
- Dialling code: 01643
- Police: Avon and Somerset
- Fire: Devon and Somerset
- Ambulance: South Western
- UK Parliament: Tiverton and Minehead

Winsford is a village and civil parish in Somerset, England, located about 5 miles (8 km) north-west of Dulverton.

It is within the borders of the Exmoor National Park and around 10 miles (16.1 km) south-west of the coastal town of Minehead. The village has a hotel, The Royal Oak dating to before the start of the 16th century, and a small shop.

The village is on the route of the Samaritans Way South West and is located within the Exmoor National Park. To the east of the village is the hamlet of West Howetown.

== History ==
Winsford Hill is the location of the Wambarrows, a number of Bronze Age burial sites, and Road Castle an Iron Age bank and ditch approximately 2 miles (3.2 km) west from the village. The ditch is almost square in plan with rounded corners and covers an area of approximately 0.7 acres (0.28 ha).

The area is home to the Caratacus Stone, a standing stone believed to have been erected by pagan inhabitants of the village, possibly as a religious memorial, bearing the inscription CARAACI NEPUS (kinsman of Caratacus) possibly from the 5th century, and first documented in 1219.

The village appears in the Domesday Book of 1085, which lists the presence of 34 smallholders, 41 villagers, 52 sheep and 9 slaves, the whole area being capable of supporting 64 ploughs, despite 40 acres (160,000 m^{2}) of it being woodland. The parish of Winsford was part of the Williton and Freemanners Hundred.

Farms in the village include Nethercote, Staddon, Bradley, Halse, Upcott and Knaplock, all of which have retained their original names since tax records from 1327, during the reign of King Edward III.

In the 17th century, Tom Faggus, a highwayman and a gentleman, was said to have held up travellers near the inn in Winsford.

On 20 August 1907 the first registered sale and show of the Exmoor Horn Sheep Breeders' Society, which was founded a year earlier, was held in the village, and "1,200 ewes were sold by auction, at an average price per head of 42 shillings".

In 1998 the Exmoor Community Computer Centre is a charitable trust took over the redundant building of the Winsford First School and established a community facility for social welfare and recreation. This later became dormant and a grant was obtained for a community facilitator to help restart the centre and re-establishing the venue as a community resource. Computer courses have also been run at Porlock and Sampford Brett.

In 2002 the body of an apparent murder victim was found on Winsford Hill. Despite extensive investigations it has yet to be identified.

== Governance ==
The parish council has responsibility for local issues, including setting an annual precept (local rate) to cover the council's operating costs and producing annual accounts for public scrutiny. The parish council evaluates local planning applications and works with the local police, district council officers, and neighbourhood watch groups on matters of crime, security, and traffic. The parish council's role also includes initiating projects for the maintenance and repair of parish facilities, as well as consulting with the district council on the maintenance, repair, and improvement of highways, drainage, footpaths, public transport, and street cleaning. Conservation matters (including trees and listed buildings) and environmental issues are also the responsibility of the council.

For local government purposes, since 1 April 2023, the parish comes under the unitary authority of Somerset Council. Prior to this, it was part of the non-metropolitan district of Somerset West and Taunton (formed on 1 April 2019) and, before this, the district of West Somerset (established under the Local Government Act 1972). It was part of Dulverton Rural District before 1974.

It is also part of the Tiverton and Minehead constituency represented in the House of Commons of the Parliament of the United Kingdom. It elects one Member of Parliament (MP) by the first past the post system of election.

== Geography ==
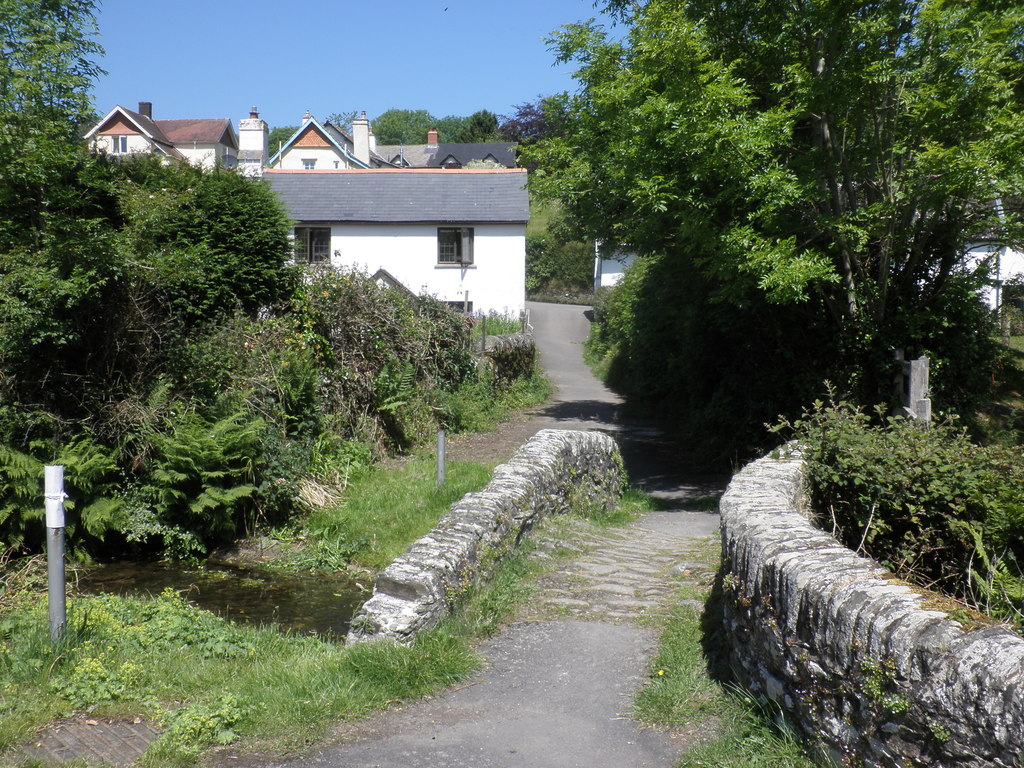
Packhorse bridge over Winn Brook

The name comes from the ford across the Winn Brook, where it meets the River Exe. There are eight bridges, providing crossing points over the many small streams that run through the village; one is a packhorse bridge, which is thought to be several hundred years old. The Vicarage Bridge is 42 inches (1,100 mm) wide and 30 feet (9.1 m) long.

Winsford Common is situated in a hollow in the surrounding countryside (which itself is within a valley), somewhat akin in shape to that of a punch bowl, and thus has gained the name of The Punchbowl. Given the shape and orientation of this deep hollow on the northeastern edge of the extensive plateau of Winsford Hill and the nature of some of the deposits within it, it has been suggested that it was the site of what may have been the only glacier on Exmoor and indeed in southwest England during the Pleistocene ice ages. It was a meeting point for the Tiverton hounds and Dulverton harriers.

The subsoil of Winsford consists of rock shillet, whereas the topsoil has more of a clay-like and loamy character. Iron ore can be found in the mineral deposits of the village, and the mining of this was formerly important to Winsford's economy. Garratts Wood covers a total area of 1.11 hectares (2.74 acres). It is owned and managed by the Woodland Trust.

== Church ==
The parish church is dedicated to St Mary Magdalene and was partly restored in 1858. The tower, which is 90 feet (27.4 m) high, was constructed in three stages. There are six bells; the four heaviest were made by Thomas Bilbie in Cullompton in 1765.

Within the church is a fine painted panel created in 1609 during the reign of King James I. The ironwork on the inner doors of the church is thought to date from the 13th century, originating from the priory of St Nicholas in Barlynch, and the font is from the Norman period. The organ was installed c. 1900, being delivered by horse-drawn wagon from nearby Dulverton. The church register dates back to 1660. The church has been designated by English Heritage as a Grade I listed building.

== Notable people ==
In 1881, the village was the birthplace of the Labour politician and Lord Privy Seal, Ernest Bevin.

In 1946, leading English psychologist Charles Samuel Myers died at his home in Winsford Glebe.

Former prime minister Boris Johnson lived at a farm in the village as a child.
