= Oare, Somerset =

Village and civil parish in Somerset, England

Coordinates: 51.20°N 03.71°W

Oare
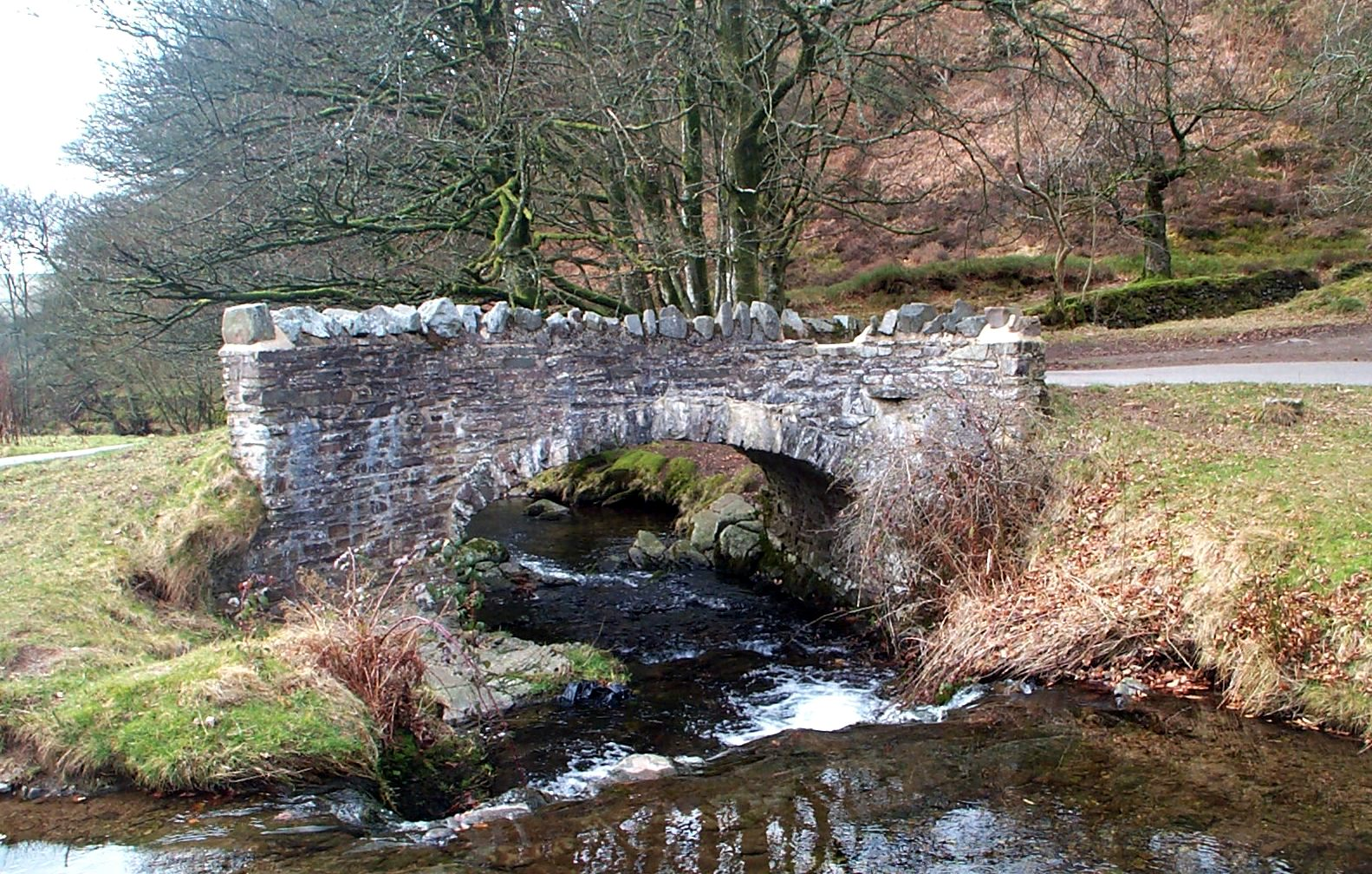
- Robber's Bridge

- Location within Somerset
- Population: 68 (2001)
- OS grid reference: SS8047
- Unitary authority: Somerset
- Ceremonial county: Somerset
- Region: South West
- Country: England
- Sovereign state: United Kingdom
- Post town: Minehead
- Postcode district: TA24
- Police: Avon and Somerset
- Fire: Devon and Somerset
- Ambulance: South Western
- UK Parliament: Tiverton and Minehead

Oare is a village and civil parish on Oare Water on Exmoor in Somerset, England. It is located 6 miles (10 km) east of Lynton and the parish includes the hamlet of Oareford and the village of Culbone which contains its own tiny church.

== History ==
The village was known as Are in the Domesday Book of 1086. After the Norman Conquest the manor was granted to Ralph de Pomeray. Later it was held by the Kelly family.

Oare was part of the hundred of Carhampton.

== Governance ==
The parish council has responsibility for local issues, including setting an annual precept (local rate) to cover the council's operating costs and producing annual accounts for public scrutiny. The parish council evaluates local planning applications and works with the local police, district council officers, and neighbourhood watch groups on matters of crime, security, and traffic.

The parish council's role also includes initiating projects for the maintenance and repair of parish facilities, as well as consulting with the district council on the maintenance, repair, and improvement of highways, drainage, footpaths, public transport, and street cleaning. Conservation matters (including trees and listed buildings) and environmental issues are also the responsibility of the council.

For local government purposes, since 1 April 2023, the parish comes under the unitary authority of Somerset Council. Prior to this, it was part of the non-metropolitan district of Somerset West and Taunton (formed on 1 April 2019) and, before this, the district of West Somerset (established under the Local Government Act 1972). It was part of Williton Rural District before 1974.

As Oare falls within the Exmoor National Park some functions normally administered by district or county councils have, since 1997, fallen under the Exmoor National Park Authority, which is known as a 'single purpose' authority, which aims to "conserve and enhance the natural beauty, wildlife and cultural heritage of the National Parks" and "promote opportunities for the understanding and enjoyment of the special qualities of the Parks by the public", including responsibility for the conservation of the historic environment.

It is also part of the Tiverton and Minehead county constituency represented in the House of Commons of the Parliament of the United Kingdom. It elects one Member of Parliament (MP) by the first past the post system of election.

== Geography ==
Oare is located within the Oare valley, part of the wider East Lyn Valley. Within the parish is Glenthorne a geological Site of Special Scientific Interest which is a Geological Conservation Review site because of the Trentishoe Member (formerly accorded 'formation' status) of the Hangman Sandstone Formation (formerly accorded 'group' status). The Hangman Sandstone represents the Middle Devonian sequence of North Devon and Somerset. These unusual freshwater deposits in the Hangman Grits were mainly formed in desert conditions.

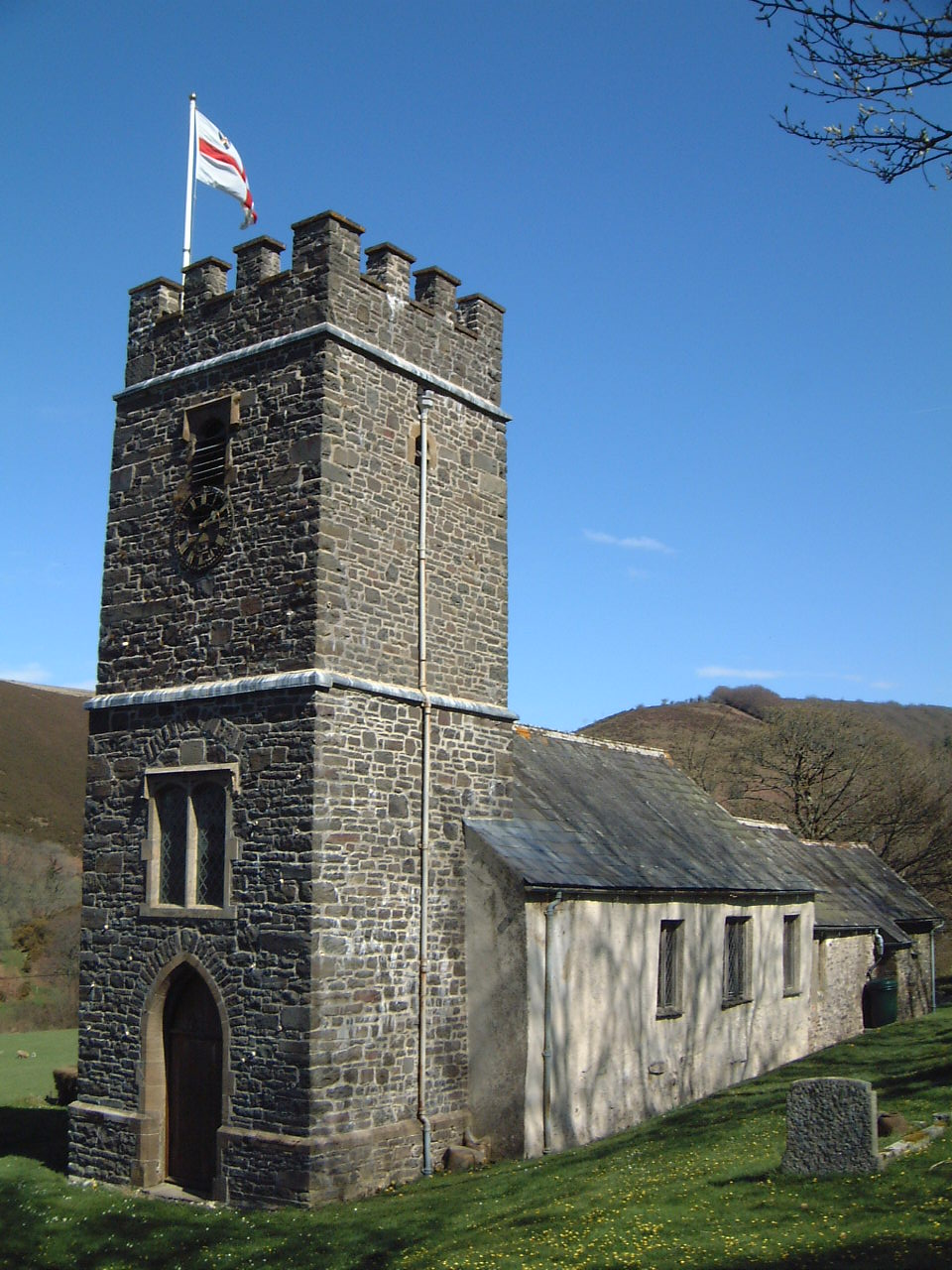
St Mary's Church, Oare

== Landmarks ==
Several bridges are prominent. Oare bridge is an 18th-century road bridge over Oare Water, and the 17th-century packhorse Malmsmead Bridge over Badgworthy Water. Robber's Bridge is an old masonry arch bridge in the royal forest of Exmoor, carrying the minor road from Porlock Hill to Oare. It crosses Weir Water and is located down a steep, wooded lane beneath overhanging trees.

== Religious sites ==
The Church of St Mary dates from the 15th century and has been designated by English Heritage as a Grade II* listed building.

== Cultural references ==
The fictional wedding of Lorna Doone in R. D. Blackmore's novel was set in the Church of St Mary, where Blackmore's grandfather had been the rector from 1809–1842.

Jonathan Hill, Baron Hill of Oareford, holds the barony of Hill of Oareford.
