= Porlock Hill =

Road in Exmoor, England

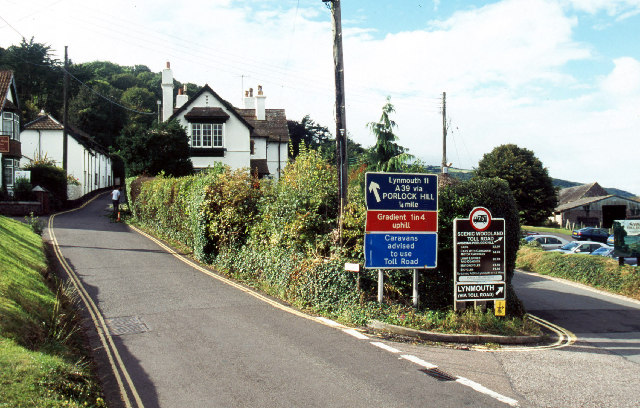
- The start of Porlock Hill, where the toll road branches off to the right

Highest point
- Elevation: 347.8 m (1,141 ft)
- Listing: Marilyn
- Coordinates: 51.206873°N 3.605371°W

Geography
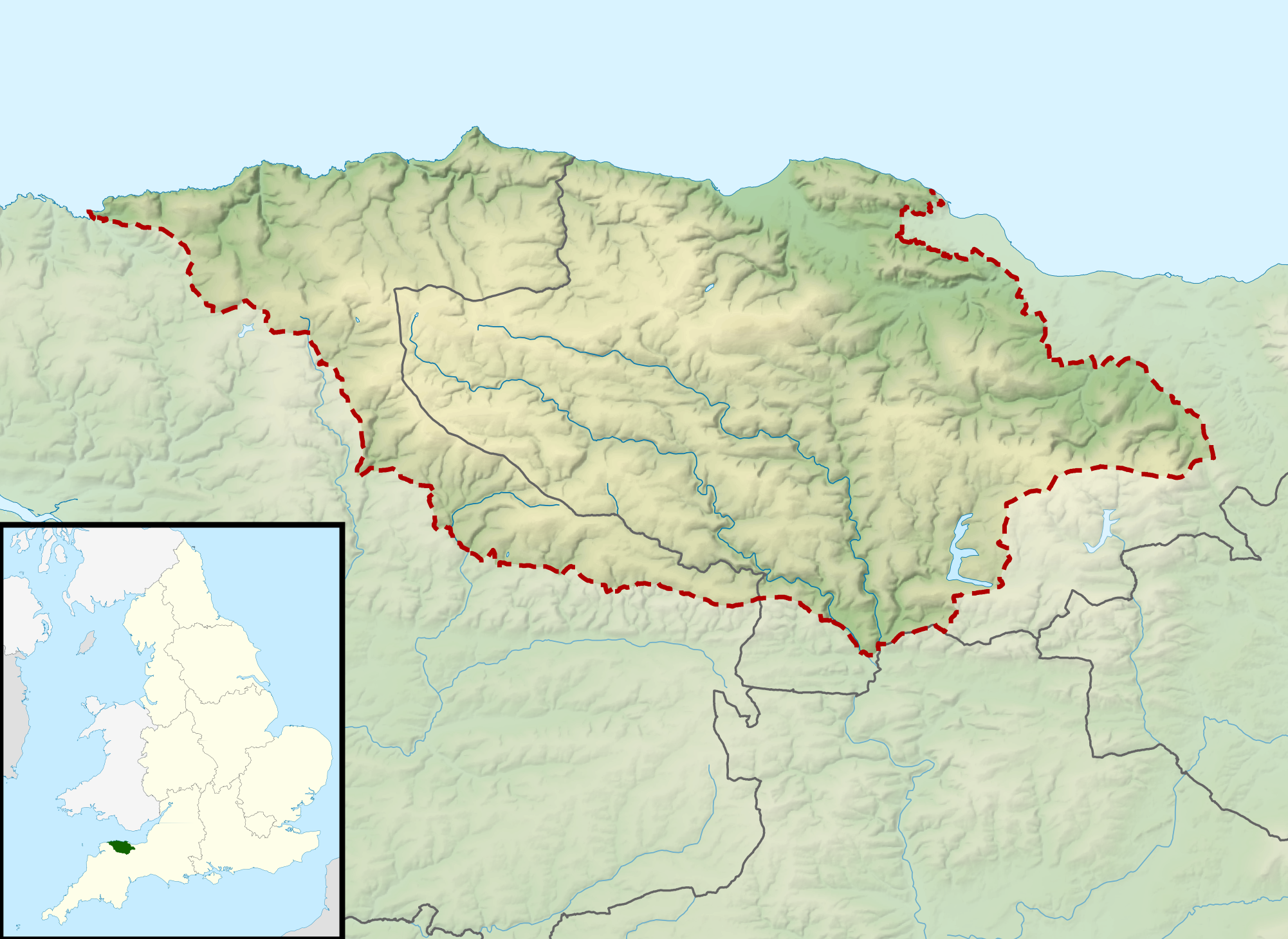
- Location within Exmoor
- Location: Exmoor, England
- OS grid: SS86384603
- Topo map: OS Explorer OL9

Porlock Hill is a road west of Porlock, Somerset. It is part of the A39, connecting Porlock to Lynmouth and Barnstaple in Devon and is one of the steepest A-roads in the United Kingdom, approaching 1 in 4 (25%) in places. A toll road is available which connects the same two endpoints at the top and bottom of the hill at an easier gradient.

== Route ==
The route climbs west of Porlock to the north fringes of Exmoor. It climbs 725 feet (221 m) in just under 1 mile (1.6 km), the steepest gradient on any A-road in the UK. At one point, there is a warning sign advising motorists of a gradient of 1 in 4 (25%).

The road is part of the A39, a long-distance road along the north coast of Somerset, Devon and Cornwall, though it is not a main through route here. Porlock Hill is not recommended for caravans or HGVs, which are strongly advised to seek another route. Cyclists are advised to dismount. The road has two escape lanes along its descent, to handle runaway vehicles.

Owing to its gradient, numerous accidents have occurred on Porlock Hill. The village's local museum has an archive of photographs documenting various incidents along it.

In Porlock itself, burning brakes of vehicles that have just descended the hill can often be smelled.

== History ==
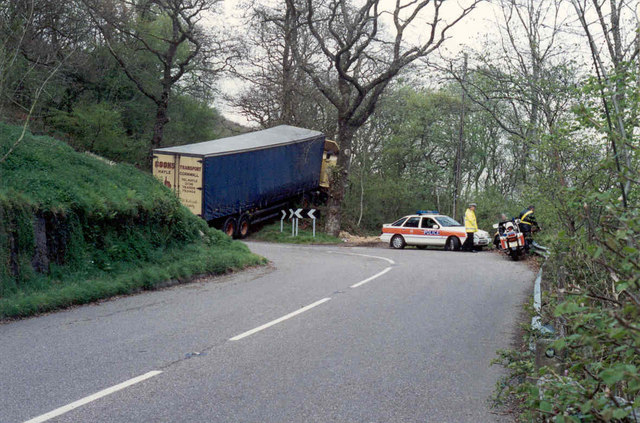
A typical accident on Porlock Hill, showing an HGV collided with a tree after being unable to brake and forced to use the escape lane

There was no practical transport west of Porlock in the 18th century. In 1794, the poet Robert Southey wrote that such a route was considered "the end of the world". In 1812, the local community was fined for not maintaining a good road, and builders were employed to construct a suitable route. The road opened in 1843 when a stagecoach travelled from Lynton to Porlock successfully.

Shortly after the road opened, a local landowner, Mr Blathwayt, decided to build a toll road further north at a more relaxed gradient of 1 in 14 (7%). The toll road was not successful initially as horse-drawn traffic could cope with Porlock Hill, but became popular owing to the increased popularity of the motor car.

During a storm in 1899, the Lynmouth lifeboat could not be launched from the harbour to aid a stricken vessel, so instead it was hauled east by land, down Porlock Hill to the weir at Porlock, where it could be launched safely. The event is remembered in the song "13 Miles" by Skinny Lister.

On 19 August 1900, Selwyn Edge became the first person to drive a motor car up Porlock Hill, winning a £50 bet in the process. The first motor coach managed to climb the hill successfully in 1916.

== Events ==
Porlock Hill is popular with cyclists. In 2015, over a hundred racers competed for a £3,100 prize to cycle up the hill along the toll road, followed by a series of children's races and a general fun ride. In 2022 for the first time there was also a race up the hill. It is listed as one of the 100 greatest cycling climbs in the UK. The toll road was the setting for the 2026 RTTC National Hill Climb Championships over a distance of 4.1 miles.

== See also ==
- Dunkery Beacon, a nearby hill that is the highest point in Exmoor and Somerset
- Gold Hill, Shaftesbury, another famous steep hill in the South West
