= Exmoor =

National park in South West England

Coordinates: 51°06′N 3°36′W

Exmoor National Park
- IUCN category V (protected landscape/seascape)
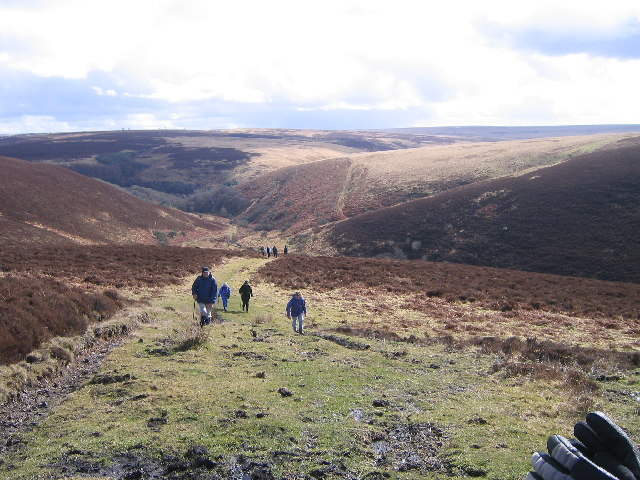
- Typical moorland scenery on Exmoor

- The national park boundaries
- Location: United Kingdom (South West England)
- Area: 692 km^{2} (267 sq mi)
- Established: 1954
- Governing body: Exmoor National Park Authority
- Website: www.exmoor-nationalpark.gov.uk

Exmoor (/ˈɛksmʊər, -mɔːr/) is loosely defined as an area of hilly open moorland in west Somerset and north Devon in South West England. It is named after the River Exe, the source of which is situated in the centre of the area, two miles north-west of Simonsbath. Exmoor is more precisely defined as the area of the former ancient royal hunting forest, also called Exmoor, which was officially surveyed 1815–1818 as 18,810 acres (7,610 ha or 76.1 km^{2}) in extent. The moor has given its name to a National Park, which includes the Brendon Hills, the East Lyn Valley, the Vale of Porlock and 55 km (34 mi) of the Bristol Channel coast. The total area of the Exmoor National Park is 692.8 km^{2} (267.5 mi^{2}), of which 71% is in Somerset and 29% in Devon.

The upland area is underlain by sedimentary rocks dating from the Devonian and early Carboniferous periods with Triassic and Jurassic age rocks on lower slopes. Where these reach the coast, cliffs are formed which are cut with ravines and waterfalls. It was recognised as a heritage coast in 1991. The highest point on Exmoor is Dunkery Beacon; at 519 metres (1,703 ft) it is also the highest point in Somerset. The terrain supports lowland heath communities, ancient woodland and blanket mire which provide habitats for scarce flora and fauna. There have also been reports of the Beast of Exmoor, a cryptozoological cat roaming Exmoor. Several areas have been designated as Nature Conservation Review and Geological Conservation Review sites.

There is evidence of human occupation from the Mesolithic. This developed for agriculture and extraction of mineral ores into the Bronze and Iron Ages. The remains of standing stones, cairns and bridges can still be identified. The royal forest was granted a charter in the 13th century, however foresters who managed the area were identified in the Domesday Book. In the Middle Ages sheep farming was common with a system of agistment licensing the grazing of livestock as the Inclosure Acts divided up the land. The area is now used for a range of recreational purposes.

== National character area ==
Exmoor has been designated as a national character area (No. 145) by Natural England, the public body responsible for England's natural environment. Neighbouring natural regions include The Culm to the southwest, the Devon Redlands to the south and the Vale of Taunton and Quantock Fringes to the east.

== Exmoor National Park ==
Exmoor was designated a National Park in 1954, under the 1949 National Parks and Access to the Countryside Act. The Exmoor National Park is primarily an upland area with a dispersed population living mainly in small villages and hamlets. The largest settlements are Porlock, Dulverton, Lynton, and Lynmouth, which together contain almost 40 per cent of the park's population. Lynton and Lynmouth are combined into one parish and are connected by the Lynton and Lynmouth Cliff Railway.

Exmoor was once a royal forest and hunting ground, covering 18,810 acres (7,610 ha), which was sold off in 1818. Several areas within the Exmoor National Park have been declared Sites of Special Scientific Interest due to their flora and fauna. This title earns the site some legal protection from development, damage and neglect. In 1993 an environmentally sensitive area was established within Exmoor. It is known as a perfect place for stargazing. In 2011, it was designated Europe's first International Dark Sky Reserve by the International Dark-Sky Association.

== Geology ==
Exmoor is an upland area formed almost exclusively from sedimentary rocks dating from the Devonian and early Carboniferous periods. The name of the geological period and system, 'Devonian', comes from Devon, as rocks of that age were first studied and described here. With the exception of a suite of Triassic and Jurassic age rocks forming the lower ground between Porlock and Timberscombe and from Minehead to Yarde (within Exmoor National Park but peripheral to the moor itself), all of the solid rocks of Exmoor are assigned to the Exmoor Group, which comprises a mix of gritstones, sandstones, slates, shales, limestone, siltstones and mudstones. Quartz and iron mineralisation can be detected in outcrops and subsoil. The Glenthorne area demonstrates the Trentishoe Member (formerly 'Formation') of the Hangman Sandstone Formation (formerly 'Group'). The Hangman Sandstone represents the Middle Devonian sequence of North Devon and Somerset. These unusual freshwater deposits in the Hangman Grits were mainly formed in desert conditions. As this area of Britain was not subject to glaciation, the plateau remains as a remarkably old landform. The bedrock and more recent superficial deposits are covered in part by moorland which is supported by wet, acid soil.

== Geography ==
=== Coastline ===
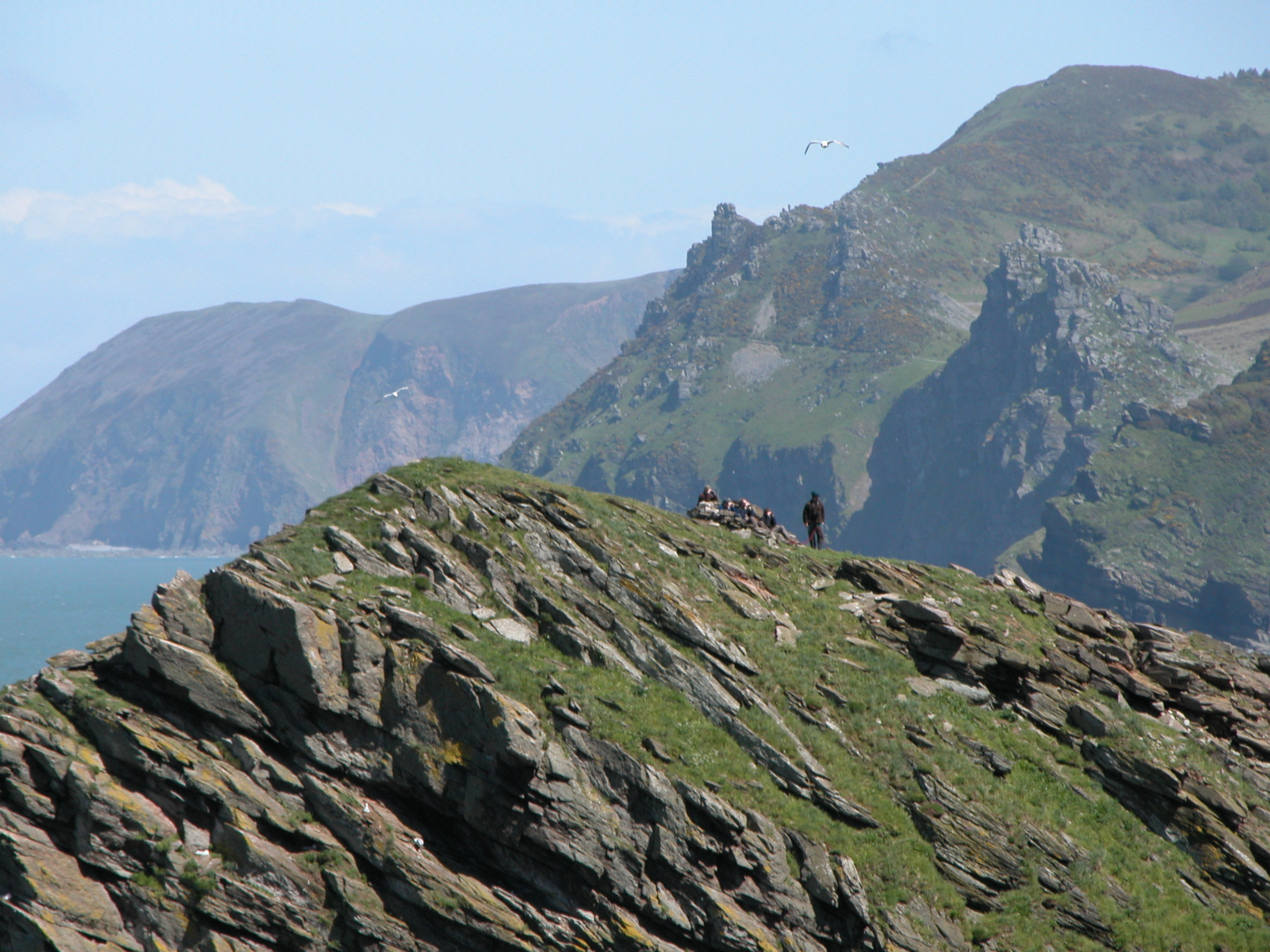
The Exmoor coastline near the Valley of Rocks

Exmoor has 55 kilometres (34 miles) of coastline. The highest sea cliff on mainland Britain (if a cliff is defined as having a slope greater than 60 degrees) is Great Hangman near Combe Martin at 318 m (1,043 ft) high, with a cliff face of 250 m (820 ft). Its sister cliff is the 200 m (656 ft) Little Hangman, which marks the edge of Exmoor. The coastal hills reach a maximum height of 414 m (1,358 ft) at Culbone Hill.

Exmoor's woodlands sometimes reach the shoreline, especially between Porlock and Foreland Point, where they form the single longest stretch of coastal woodland in England and Wales. The Exmoor Coastal Heaths have been recognised as a Site of Special Scientific Interest due to the diversity of plant species present.

The scenery of rocky headlands, ravines, waterfalls and towering cliffs gained the Exmoor coast recognition as a heritage coast in 1991. With its huge waterfalls and caves, this dramatic coastline has become an adventure playground for both climbers and explorers. The cliffs provide one of the longest and most isolated seacliff traverses in the UK. The South West Coast Path, at 1,014 kilometres (630 mi) the longest National Trail in England and Wales, starts at Minehead and runs along all of Exmoor's coast. There are small harbours at Lynmouth, Porlock Weir and Combe Martin. Once crucial to coastal trade, the harbours are now primarily used for pleasure; individually owned sailing boats and non-commercial fishing boats are often found in the harbours. The Valley of Rocks beyond Lynton is a deep dry valley that runs parallel to the nearby sea and is capped on the seaward side by large rocks, and Sexton's Burrows forms a natural breakwater to the harbour of Watermouth Bay on the coast.

=== Rivers ===
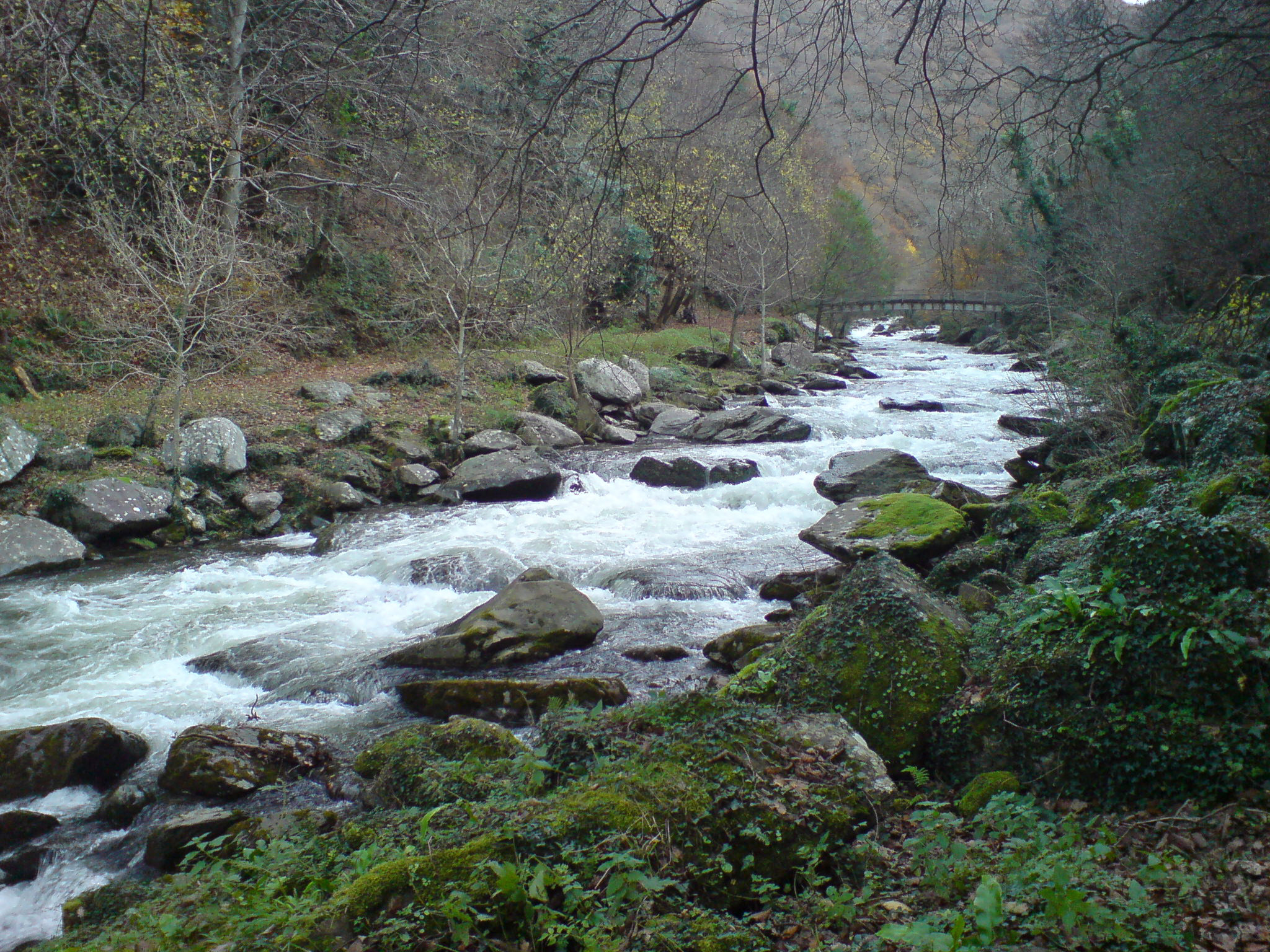
The East Lyn River

The high ground forms the catchment area for numerous rivers and streams. There are about 483 km (300 mi) of named rivers on Exmoor. The River Exe, after which Exmoor is named, rises at Exe Head near the village of Simonsbath, close to the Bristol Channel coast, but flows more or less directly due south, so that most of its length lies in Devon. It reaches the sea at a substantial ria (estuary) on the south (English Channel) coast of Devon. It has several tributaries which arise on Exmoor. The River Barle runs from northern Exmoor to join the River Exe at Exebridge, Devon. The river and the Barle Valley are both designated as biological Sites of Special Scientific Interest. Another tributary, the River Haddeo, flows from the Wimbleball Lake.

Most other rivers arising on Exmoor flow north to the Bristol Channel. These include the River Heddon, which runs along the western edges of Exmoor, reaching the North Devon coast at Heddon's Mouth, and the East and West Lyn rivers, which meet at Watersmeet immediately east of Lynmouth. Hoar Oak Water is a moorland tributary of the East Lyn River which also has its confluence there. The River Horner, which is also known as Horner Water, rises near Luccombe and flows into Porlock Bay near Hurlstone Point. The River Mole arises on the south-western flanks of Exmoor and is the major tributary of the River Taw, which itself flows northward from Dartmoor. Badgworthy Water is one of the small rivers running north to the coast and is associated with the Lorna Doone legends.

== Climate ==
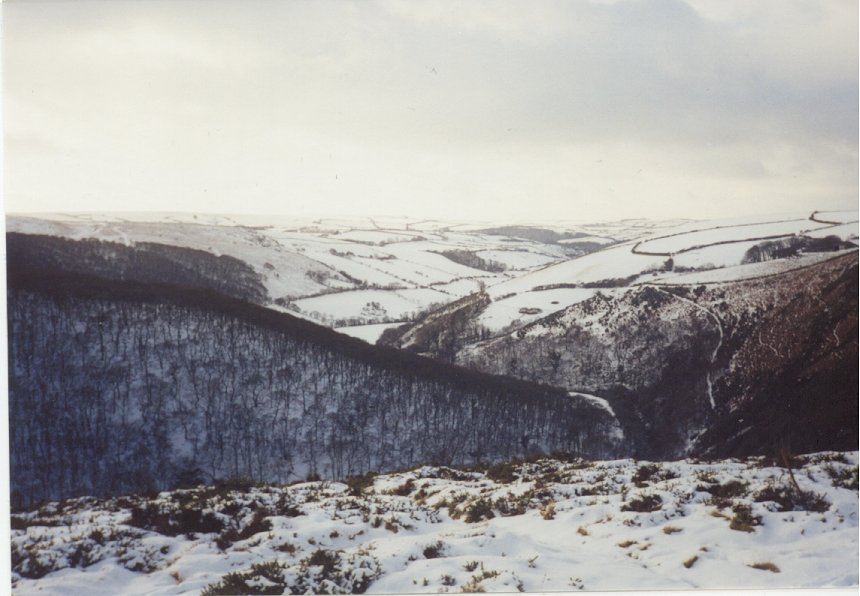
Horner Woods, Exmoor, in winter

Along with the rest of South West England, Exmoor has a temperate climate which is generally wetter and milder than the rest of England. The mean annual temperature at Simonsbath is 8.3 °C (46.9 °F) with a seasonal and diurnal variation, but due to the modifying effect of the sea the range is less than in most other parts of the UK. January is the coldest month, with mean minimum temperatures between 1 and 2 °C (34 and 36 °F). July and August are the warmest months in the region, with mean daily maxima around 21 °C (70 °F). In general, December is the month with the least sunshine and June the month with the most sun. The south-west of England has a favoured location with regard to the Azores high pressure when it extends its influence north-eastwards towards the UK, particularly in summer.

Cloud often forms inland, especially near hills, and reduce the amount of sunshine that reaches the park. The average annual sunshine is about 1,600 hours. Rainfall tends to be associated with Atlantic depressions or with convection. In summer, convection, caused by the sun heating the land surface more than the sea, sometimes forms rain clouds and at that time of year a large proportion of the rainfall comes from showers and thunderstorms. Annual precipitation varies from 800 mm (31 in) in the east of the park to over 2,000 mm (79 in) at The Chains. However, in the 24 hours of 16 August 1952, more than 225 mm (8.9 in) of rain fell at The Chains. This rainfall, which followed an exceptionally wet summer, led to disastrous flooding in Lynmouth with 34 dead and extensive damage to the small town.

Snowfall is very variable from year to year and ranges from 23 days on the high moors to about 6 on coastal areas. November to March have the highest mean wind speeds, with June to August having the lightest winds. The wind comes mostly from the south-west.

There are two Met Office Weather stations recording climate data within Exmoor: Liscombe and Nettlecombe.

Climate data for Nettlecombe 96 m asl, 1971–2000
| Month | Jan | Feb | Mar | Apr | May | Jun | Jul | Aug | Sep | Oct | Nov | Dec | Year |
|---|---|---|---|---|---|---|---|---|---|---|---|---|---|
| Mean daily maximum °C (°F) | 7.9 (46.2) | 8.0 (46.4) | 10.2 (50.4) | 12.2 (54.0) | 15.6 (60.1) | 18.3 (64.9) | 20.7 (69.3) | 20.5 (68.9) | 17.8 (64.0) | 14.2 (57.6) | 10.8 (51.4) | 8.8 (47.8) | 13.8 (56.8) |
| Mean daily minimum °C (°F) | 1.9 (35.4) | 1.8 (35.2) | 3.0 (37.4) | 3.6 (38.5) | 6.2 (43.2) | 8.8 (47.8) | 10.9 (51.6) | 10.8 (51.4) | 9.0 (48.2) | 6.7 (44.1) | 4.1 (39.4) | 2.9 (37.2) | 5.8 (42.4) |
| Average precipitation mm (inches) | 123.6 (4.87) | 87.6 (3.45) | 80.6 (3.17) | 66.3 (2.61) | 62.6 (2.46) | 58.7 (2.31) | 43.4 (1.71) | 66.5 (2.62) | 85.4 (3.36) | 108.6 (4.28) | 106.6 (4.20) | 128.7 (5.07) | 1,018.6 (40.10) |
Source: MetOffice

== History ==
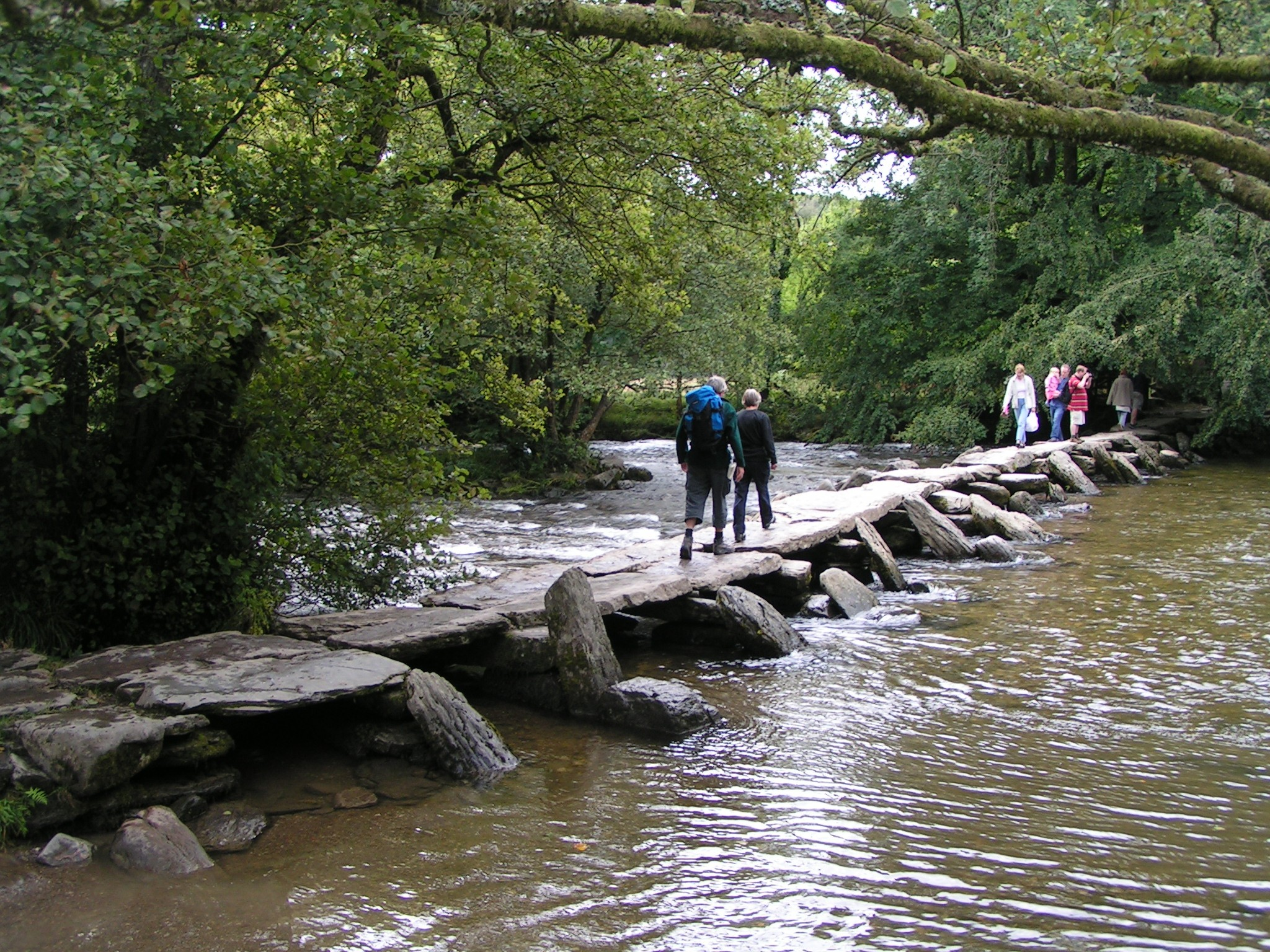
Tarr steps clapper bridge.

There is evidence of occupation of the area by people from Mesolithic times onward. In the Neolithic period, people started to manage animals and grow crops on farms cleared from the woodland, rather than act purely as hunters and as gatherers. It is also likely that extraction and smelting of mineral ores to make metal tools, weapons, containers and ornaments started in the late Neolithic, and continued into the Bronze and Iron Ages. An earthen ring at Parracombe is believed to be a Neolithic henge dating from 5000–4000 BC, and Cow Castle, which is where White Water meets the River Barle, is an Iron Age fort at the top of a conical hill.

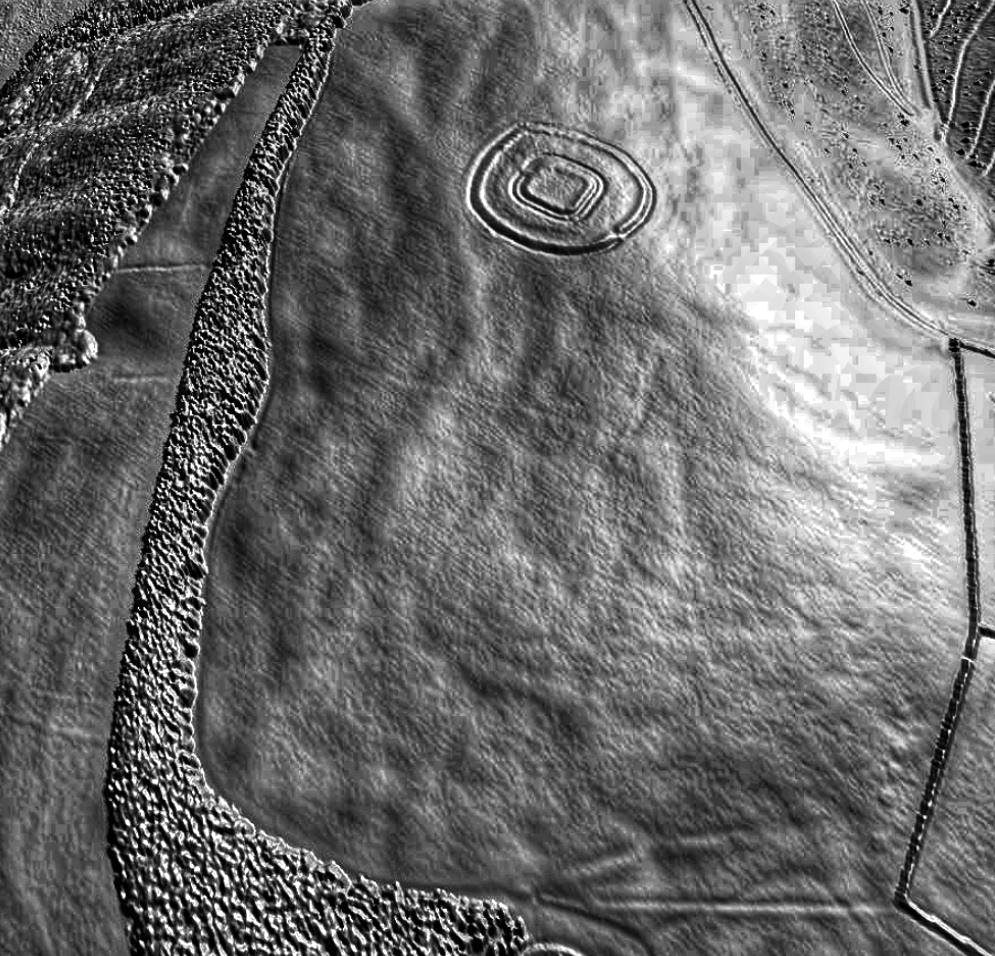
A lidar view of Old Burrow Roman fortlet east of Lynmouth

Tarr Steps are a prehistoric (c. 1000 BC) clapper bridge across the River Barle, about 4 km (2 1/2 mi) south-east of Withypool and 6 km (4 mi) north-west of Dulverton. The stone slabs weigh up to 5 tonnes apiece, and the bridge has been designated by English Heritage as a grade I listed building, to recognise its special architectural, historical or cultural significance. There is little evidence of Roman occupation apart from two fortlets on the coast. Lanacombe is the site of several standing stones and cairns which have been scheduled as ancient monuments. The stone settings are between 30 cm (12 in) and 65 cm (26 in) high. A series of Bronze Age stone cairns are closely associated with the standing stones.

Holwell Castle, at Parracombe, was a Norman motte-and-bailey castle built to guard the junction of the east–west and north–south trade routes, enabling movement of people and goods and the growth of the population. Alternative explanations for its construction suggest it may have been constructed to obtain taxes at the River Heddon bridging place, or to protect and supervise silver mining in the area around Combe Martin. It was 40 metres (131 ft) in diameter and 6.2 m (20 ft) high above the bottom of a rock cut ditch which is 2.7 m (9 ft) deep. It was built, in the late 11th or early 12th century. The earthworks of the castle are still clearly visible from a nearby footpath, but there is no public access to them.

=== Establishment of royal forest ===
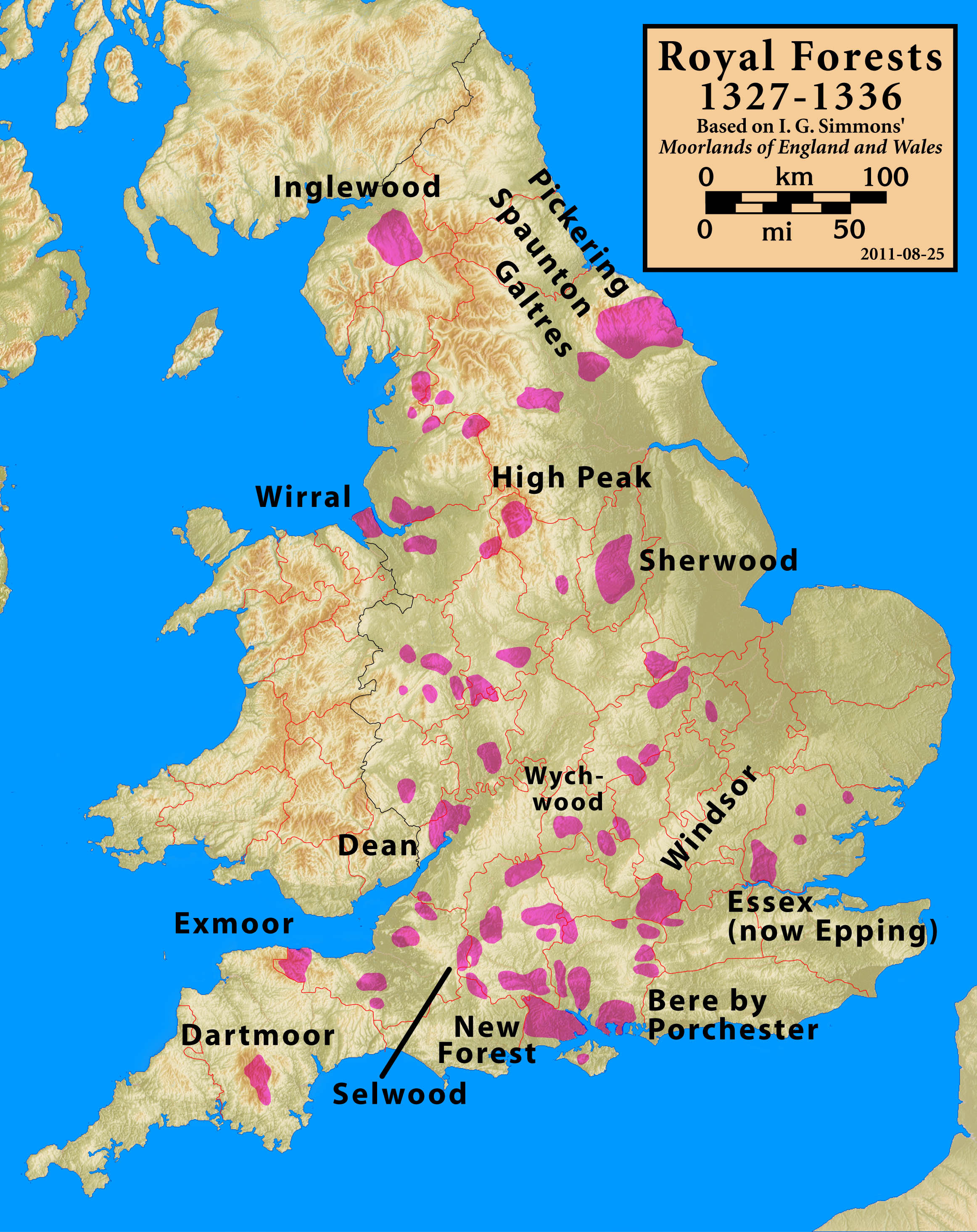

According to the late 13th-century Hundred Rolls, King Henry II of England (d. 1189) gave William of Wrotham the office of steward of Exmoor. The terms steward, warden and forester appear to be synonymous for the king's chief officer of the royal forest.

=== Wardens ===
The first recorded wardens were Dodo, Almer and Godric who were named in the Domesday Book (1086) as "foresters of Widepolla", Withypool having been the ancient capital of the forest. The family of Denys were associated with Ilchester and "Petherton". William of Wrotham, who died in 1217, was steward of the forests of Exmoor and North Petherton, Somerset. Walter and Robert were named as foresters of Exmoor when they witnessed an early 13th-century grant to Forde Abbey. In 1276 the jurors of Brushford manor made a complaint about John de Camera in the Court of Exchequer in which he was described as forester of Exmoor.

William Lucar of "Wythecomb", the brother of Elizabeth Lucar, was forester temp. under Henry VI, between 1422 and 1461. William de Botreaux, 3rd Baron Botreaux was appointed in 1435 warden of the forests of Exmoor and Neroche for life by Richard Duke of York. The Botreaux family had long held the manor of Molland at the southern edge of Exmoor, but were probably resident mainly at North Cadbury in Somerset. On 10 May 1461 William Bourchier, 9th Baron FitzWarin, feudal baron of Bampton was appointed by King Edward IV as Master Forester of the Forests of Exmoor and Neroche for life. Sir John Poyntz of Iron Acton, Gloucestershire, was warden or chief forester of Exmoor in 1568 when he brought an action in the Court of Exchequer against Henry Rolle (of Heanton Satchville, Petrockstowe), the powerful lord of the manors of Exton, Hawkridge and Withypool.

In 1608 Sir Hugh Pollard was named as chief forester in a suit brought before the Court of Exchequer by his deputy William Pincombe. James Butler, 1st Duke of Ormonde, was named as Keeper of Exmoor Forest in 1660 and 1661. James Boevey was a forester in the 17th century. Sir Richard Acland (or possibly Sir Thomas Dyke Acland) was the last forester up to 1818. One of the roles of the Warden was Master of Staghounds and this role continued to be exercised by the Master of the Devon and Somerset Staghounds, a position extant today. By 1820 the royal forest had been divided up. A quarter of the forest, 10,262 acres (4,153 ha), was sold to John Knight (1765–1850) in 1818. This section comprises the present Exmoor Parish, whose parish church is situated in Simonsbath.

== Wool trade ==
The parish of Exmoor Forest was part of the Hundred of Williton and Freemanners.

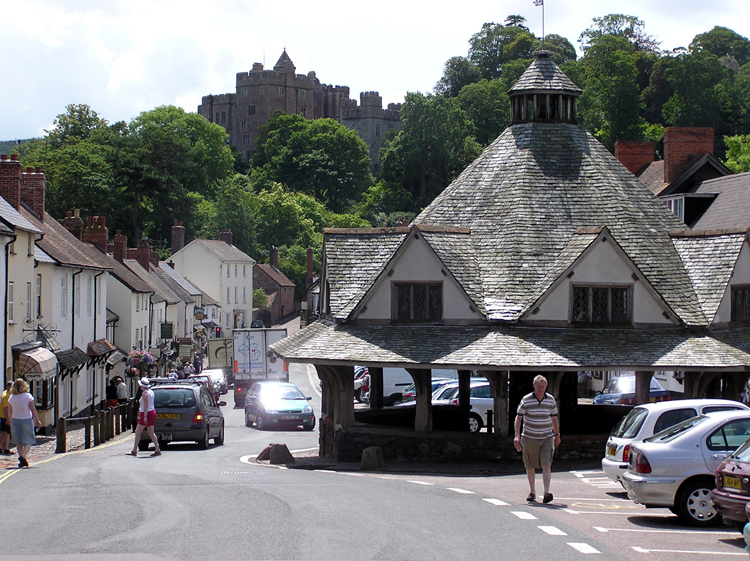
Dunster Yarn Market (a covered market for the sale of local cloth, built in 1609) and Dunster Castle, Exmoor

During the Middle Ages, sheep farming for the wool trade came to dominate the economy. The wool was spun into thread on isolated farms and collected by merchants to be woven, fulled, dyed and finished in thriving towns such as Dunster. The land started to be enclosed and from the 17th century onwards larger estates developed, leading to establishment of areas of large regular shaped fields. During the 16th and 17th centuries the commons were overstocked with agisted livestock, from farmers outside the immediate area who were charged for the privilege. This led to disputes about the number of animals allowed and the enclosure of land. In the mid-17th century James Boevey was the warden. The house that he built at Simonsbath was the only one in the forest for 150 years. When the royal forest was sold off in 1818, John Knight bought the Simonsbath House and the accompanying farm for £50,000. He set about converting the royal forest into agricultural land. He and his family also built most of the large farms in the central section of the moor as well as 35.4 km (22.0 mi) of metalled access roads to Simonsbath and a 46.7 km (29.0 mi) wall around his estate, much of which still survives.

In the mid-19th century a mine was developed alongside the River Barle. The mine was originally called Wheal Maria, then changed to Wheal Eliza. It was a copper mine from 1845 to 1854 and then an iron mine until 1857, although the first mining activity on the site may be from 1552. At Simonsbath, a restored Victorian water-powered sawmill, which was damaged in the floods of 1992, has now been purchased by the National Park and returned to working order; it is now used to make the footpath signs, gates, stiles and bridges for various sites in the park.

== Ecology ==
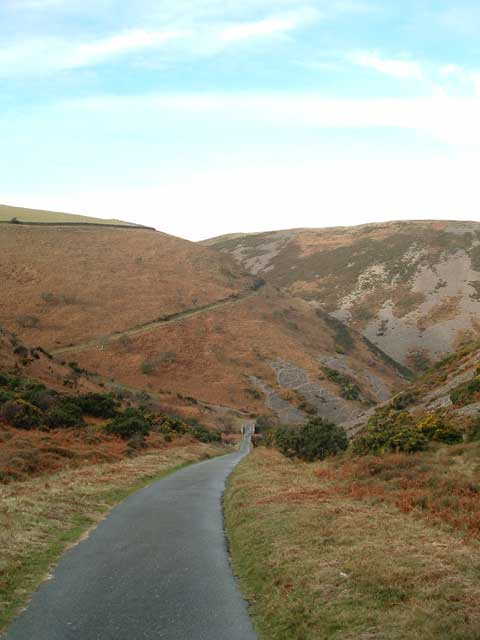
Caddow Combe, near Foreland Point, representative of much of Exmoor's unimproved landscape

In addition to the Exmoor Coastal Heaths Site of Special Scientific Interest (SSSI), two other areas are specifically designated. North Exmoor covers 12,005.3 hectares (29,666 acres) and includes the Dunkery Beacon and the Holnicote and Horner Water Nature Conservation Review sites, and the Chains Geological Conservation Review site. The Chains site is nationally important for its south-western lowland heath communities and for transitions from Ancient woodland through upland heath to blanket mire. The site is also of importance for its breeding bird communities, its large population of the nationally rare heath fritillary (Mellicta athalia), an exceptional woodland lichen flora and its palynological interest of deep peat on the Chains.

The South Exmoor SSSI is smaller, covering 3,132.7 hectares (7,741 acres) and including the River Barle and its tributaries with submerged plants such as alternate water-milfoil (Myriophyllum alterniflorum). There are small areas of semi-natural woodland within the site, including some which are ancient. The most abundant tree species is sessile oak (Quercus petraea), the shrub layer is very sparse and the ground flora includes bracken, bilberry and a variety of mosses. The heaths have strong breeding populations of birds, including whinchat (Saxicola rubetra) and European stonechat (Saxicola rubicola). Wheatear (Oenanthe oenanthe) are common near stone boundary walls and other stony places. Grasshopper warbler (Locustella naevia) breed in scrub and tall heath. Trees on the moorland edges provide nesting sites for Lesser redpoll (Acanthis cabaret), common buzzard (Buteo buteo) and raven (Corvus corax).

=== Flora ===
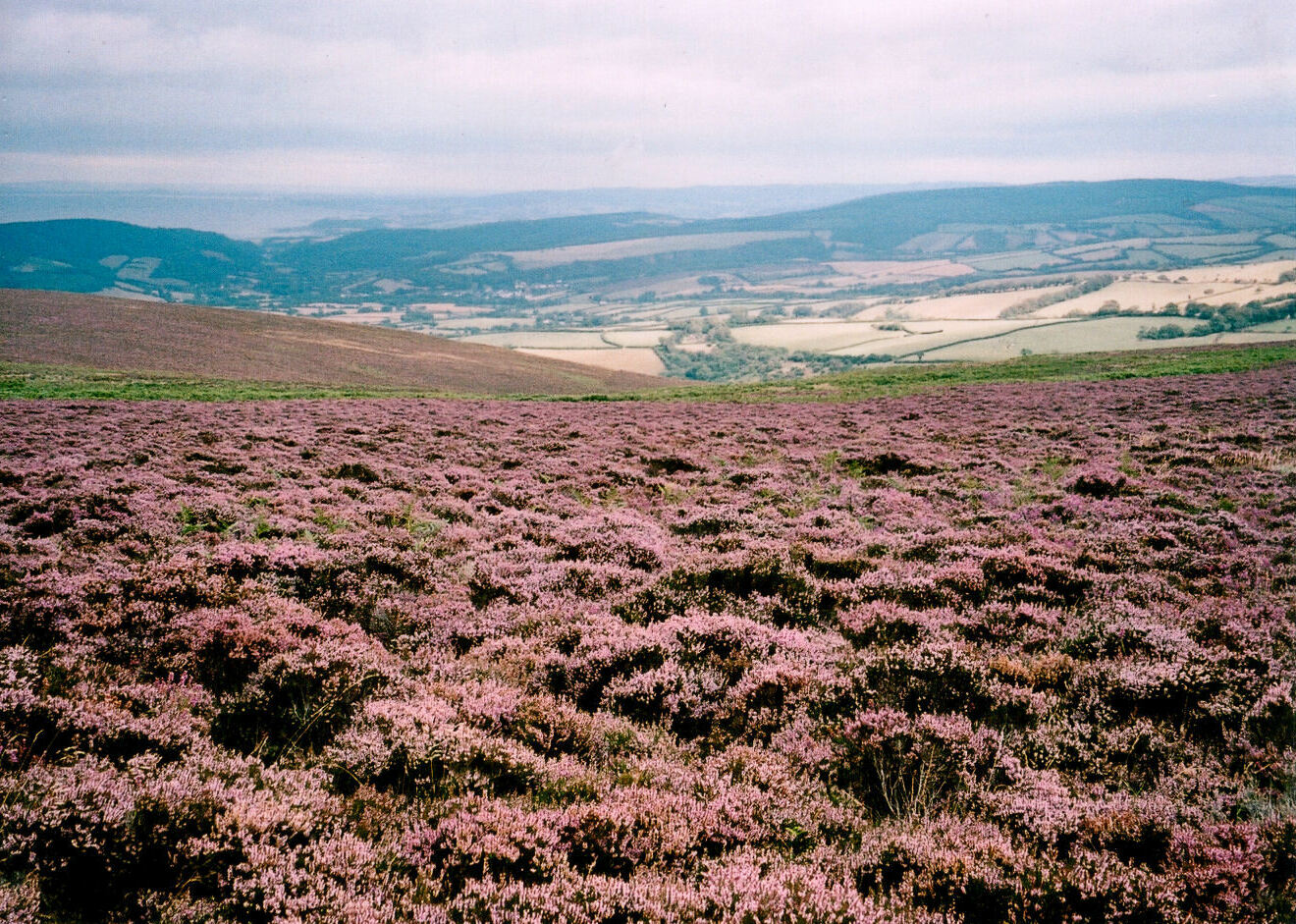
Dunkery Beacon, with heather in bloom

Uncultivated heath and moorland cover about a quarter of Exmoor landscape. Some moors are covered by a variety of grasses and sedges, while others are dominated by heather. There are also cultivated areas including the Brendon Hills, which lie in the east of the National Park. There are also 3,000 hectares (7,400 acres) of Forestry Commission woodland, comprising a mixture of broad-leaved (oak, ash and hazel) and conifer trees. Horner Woodlands and Tarr Steps woodlands are prime examples. The country's highest beech tree, 350 m (1,150 ft) above sea level, is at Birch Cleave at Simonsbath but beech in hedgebanks grow up to 490 m (1,610 ft). At least two species of whitebeam: Sorbus subcuneata and Sorbus 'Taxon D' are unique to Exmoor. These woodlands are home to lichens, mosses and ferns. Exmoor is the only national location for the lichens Biatoridium delitescens, Rinodina fimbriata and Rinodina flavosoralifera, the latter having been found only on one individual tree.

In 2024, plans were unveiled to plant approximately 38,000 trees near the sea on Exmoor as part of a larger initiative led by the National Trust to plant over 100,000 trees in northern Devon, aimed at supporting Celtic rainforests. Among the species earmarked for planting is the nearly extinct Devon whitebeam, a tree found only in England's West Country and in Ireland. It can reproduce without fertilization and once had its edible fruit sold as "sorb apples" in Devon markets.

=== Fauna ===
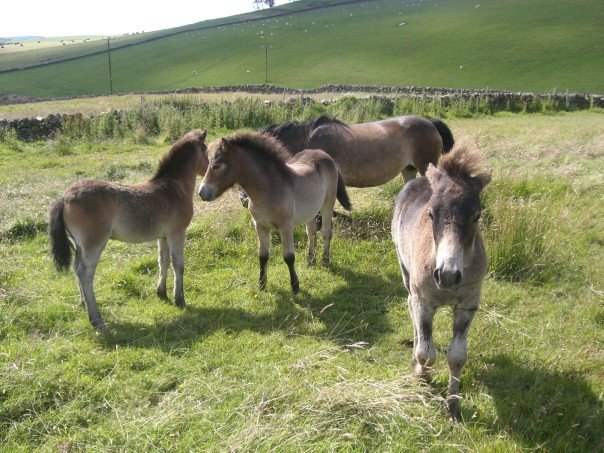
A herd of Exmoor pony foals

Sheep have grazed on the moors for more than 3,000 years, shaping much of the Exmoor landscape by feeding on moorland grasses and heather. Traditional breeds include Exmoor Horn, Cheviot and Whiteface Dartmoor and Greyface Dartmoor sheep. North Devon cattle are also farmed in the area. Exmoor ponies can be seen roaming freely on the moors. They are a landrace rather than a breed of pony, and may be the closest breed to wild horses remaining in Europe; they are also one of the oldest breeds of pony in the world. The ponies are rounded up once a year to be marked and checked over. In 1818 Sir Thomas Acland, the last warden of Exmoor, took thirty ponies and established the Acland Herd, now known as the Anchor Herd, whose direct descendants still roam the moor. In the Second World War the moor became a training ground, and the breed was nearly killed off, with only 50 ponies surviving the war. The ponies are classified as endangered by the Rare Breeds Survival Trust, with only 390 breeding females left in the UK. In 2006 a Rural Enterprise Grant, administered locally by the South West Rural Development Service, was obtained to create a new Exmoor Pony Centre at Ashwick, at a disused farm with 7 hectares (17 acres) of land with a further 56 hectares (140 acres) of moorland.

Red deer have a stronghold on the moor and can be seen on quiet hillsides in remote areas, particularly in the early morning. The Emperor of Exmoor, a red stag (Cervus elaphus), was Britain's largest known wild land animal, until it was killed in October 2010. The moorland habitat is also home to hundreds of species of birds and insects. Birds seen on the moor include merlin, peregrine falcon, Eurasian curlew, European stonechat, dipper, Dartford warbler and ring ouzel. Black grouse and red grouse are now extinct on Exmoor, probably as a result of a reduction in habitat management, and for the former species, an increase in visitor pressure.

=== Beast ===
The Beast of Exmoor is a cryptozoological cat (see phantom cat) that is reported to roam Exmoor. There have been numerous reports of eyewitness sightings. The BBC calls it "the famous-yet-elusive beast of Exmoor". Sightings were first reported in the 1970s although it became notorious in 1983, when a South Molton farmer claimed to have lost over 100 sheep in the space of three months, all of them apparently killed by violent throat injuries. In response to these reports Royal Marines Commandos were deployed from bases in the West Country to watch for the mythical beast from covert observation points. After 6 months no sightings had been made by the Royal Marines and the deployments were ended. Descriptions of its colouration range from black to tan or dark grey. It is possibly a cougar or black leopard which was released after a law was passed in 1976 making it illegal for them to be kept in captivity outside zoos. In 2006, the British Big Cats Society reported that a skull found by a Devon farmer was that of a puma; however, the Department for Environment, Food and Rural Affairs (Defra) states, "Based on the evidence, Defra does not believe that there are big cats living in the wild in England."

== Government and politics ==
The official Flag of Exmoor, unveiled at the West Somerset Railway Station in Minehead on 29 October 2014

The National Park, 71% of which is in Somerset and 29% in Devon, has a resident population of 10,600. It was designated a National Park in 1954, under the 1949 National Parks and Access to the Countryside Act. About three quarters of the park is privately owned, made up of numerous private estates. The largest landowners are the National Trust, which owns over 10% of the land, and the National Park Authority, which owns about 7%. Other areas are owned by the Forestry Commission, Crown Estate and Water Companies. The largest private landowner is the Badgworthy Land Company, which represents hunting interests.

From 1954 on, local government was the responsibility of the district and county councils, which remain responsible for the social and economic well-being of the local community. Since 1997 the Exmoor National Park Authority, which is known as a 'single purpose' authority, has taken over some functions to meet its aims to "conserve and enhance the natural beauty, wildlife and cultural heritage of the National Parks" and "promote opportunities for the understanding and enjoyment of the special qualities of the parks by the public", including responsibility for the conservation of the historic environment.

The Park Authority receives 80% of its funding as a direct grant from the government. The Park Authority Committee consists of members from parish and county councils, and six appointed by the Secretary of State. The work is carried out by 80 staff including rangers, volunteers and a team of estate workers who carry out a wide range of tasks including maintaining the many miles of rights of way, hedge laying, fencing, swaling, walling, invasive weed control and habitat management on National Park Authority land. There are ongoing debates between the authority and farmers over the biological monitoring of SSSIs, showing the need for a controlled regime of grazing and burning; farmers claim that these regimes are not practical or effective in the long term.

The National Park Authority operates CareMoor for Exmoor as an opportunity for those that appreciate the area to give back, with donations supporting conservation and access projects.

== Sport and recreation ==
Sightseeing, walking, cycling and mountain biking taking in Exmoor's dramatic heritage coastline and moorland countryside scenery are the main attractions. The South West Coast Path starts at Minehead and follows all along the Exmoor coast before continuing to Poole. The Coleridge Way is an 82 km (51 mi) footpath which follows the walks taken by poet Samuel Taylor Coleridge to Lynmouth, starting from Coleridge Cottage at Nether Stowey in the Quantocks where he once lived. The Two Moors Way runs from Ivybridge in South Devon to Lynmouth on the coast of North Devon, crossing parts of both Dartmoor and Exmoor. Both of these walks intersect with the South West Coast Path, Britain's longest National Trail. Other Exmoor walking trails include the Tarka Trail, Samaritans Way South West, Macmillan Way West, Exe Valley Way and Celtic Way Exmoor Option.

In addition to long distant walks the Exmoor National Park Authority promote a series 'top walks' in 3 collections of Exmoor Strolls (step and stile free routes more accessible routes), Exmoor Explorers (shorter walks to discover the best of Exmoor) and Exmoor Classics (longer walks to discover more of Exmoor).

For others, although the hunting of animal with hounds was made illegal by the Hunting Act 2004, the Exmoor hunts still meet in full regalia and there is a campaign to resurrect this rural sport. Nine hunts cover the area—the Devon and Somerset Staghounds and the Quantock Staghounds, the Exmoor, Dulverton West, Dulverton Farmers and West Somerset Foxhounds, the Minehead Harriers, the West Somerset Beagles and the North Devon Beagles. During the spring, amateur steeplechase meetings (point-to-points) are run by hunts at temporary courses such as Bratton Down and Holnicote. These, along with thoroughbred racing and pony racing, are an opportunity for farmers, hunt staff and the public to witness a day of traditional country entertainment.

== Places of interest ==
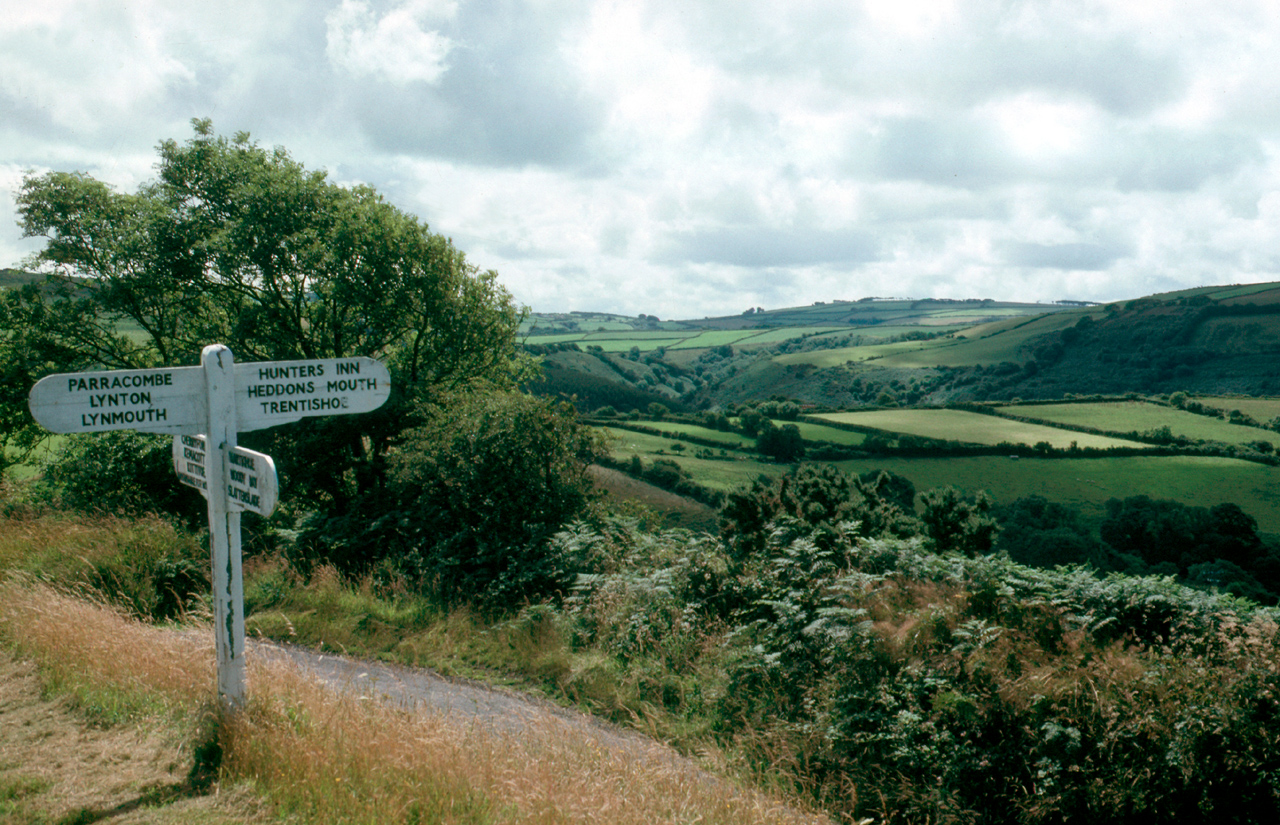
Exmoor landscape

The attractions of Exmoor include 208 Scheduled monuments, 16 conservation areas, and other open access land as designated by the Countryside and Rights of Way Act 2000. Exmoor receives approximately 1.4 million visitor days per year which include single day visits and those for longer periods.

The Exmoor National Park Authority operates three Exmoor National Park Centres in Dulverton, Dunster and Lynmouth to provide information and inspiration for users of the National Park.

Attractions on the coast include the Lynton and Lynmouth Cliff Railway, which connects Lynton to neighbouring picturesque Lynmouth at the confluence of the East Lyn and West Lyn rivers, nearby Valley of Rocks and Watersmeet.

Woody Bay, a few miles west of Lynton, is home to the Lynton & Barnstaple Railway, a narrow-gauge railway which once connected the twin towns of Lynton and Lynmouth to Barnstaple, about 31 km (just over 19 miles) away.

Further along the coast, Porlock is a quiet coastal town with an adjacent salt marsh nature reserve and a harbour at nearby Porlock Weir. Watchet is a historic harbour town with a marina and is home to a carnival, which is held annually in July.

Inland, many of the attractions are small towns and villages or linked to the river valleys, such as the ancient clapper bridge at Tarr Steps and the Snowdrop Valley near Wheddon Cross, which is carpeted in snowdrops in February and, later, displays bluebells. Withypool is also in the Barle Valley, the Two Moors Way passes through the village. As well as Dunster Castle, Dunster's other attractions include a priory, dovecote, yarn market, inn, packhorse bridge, mill and a stop on the West Somerset Railway. Exford lies on the River Exe.

Exmoor has been the setting for several novels including the 19th-century Lorna Doone: A Romance of Exmoor by R. D. Blackmore, and Margaret Drabble's 1998 novel The Witch of Exmoor. The park was featured on the television programme Seven Natural Wonders twice, as one of the wonders of the West Country.

Wheal Eliza Mine on the River Barle near Simonsbath was an unsuccessful copper and iron mine.

Near Wheddon Cross is Snowdrop Valley, which becomes filled with thousands of little white flowers called snowdrops during early spring. Within the valley is a sawmill, formerly powered by the River Avill, which runs through the valley.

== Principal summits ==
The following summits within the National Park boundaries have at least 30 metres of prominence:

1. Dunkery Beacon (519.9 m)
2. Five Barrows Hill (493.4 m)
3. Chains Barrow (486.4 m)
4. Shoulsbarrow Common (476 m)
5. Black Mires (465 m)
6. Horsen Hill (442.9 m)
7. North Molton Ridge (435.1 m)
8. Withypool Common (428 m)
9. Winsford Hill (427 m)
10. Lype Hill (423.8 m)
11. Thornemead Hill (412 m)
12. Treborough Common (412 m)
13. Withypool Hill (399 m)
14. Road Hill (391 m)
15. Staddon Hill (386 m)
16. Monkham Hill (381.7 m)
17. Bye Common (366 m)
18. Blagdon Hill (361 m)
19. Hadborough (355 m)
20. Oldrey Hill (355 m)
21. Holdstone Hill (349.5 m)
22. Couple Cross Hill (344 m)
23. Kipscombe Hill (343 m)
24. Kentisbury Down (337 m)
25. Cow Castle (332 m)
26. Storridge Hill (327 m)
27. Great Hangman (318 m)
28. Ley Hill (318 m)
29. Lynton Hill (318 m)
30. Upton Hill (317 m)
31. Selworthy Beacon (308.5 m)
32. South Down (298 m)
33. Periton Hill (297.4 m)
34. Heale Down (296 m)
35. Kings Wood Hill (292 m)
36. West Howe Hill (289 m)
37. South Greenslade Hill (284 m)
38. Hiccombe Hill (266 m)
39. Wind Hill (261 m)
40. Heddon's Mouth Hill (248 m)
41. Hollerday Hill (243.8 m)
42. Pixton Hill (239 m)
43. Withycombe Hill (222 m)
44. Little Hangman (218 m)
45. The Balls (146 m)
46. Castle Rock (138.9 m)
47. Knowle Top (135 m)
48. Conygar Tower (103.4 m)
49. Dunster Castle (85 m)

The following summits outside the National Park have 30 metres prominence and are over 300 metres in height:

1. Elworthy Barrows (394 m)
2. Heydon Hill (342 m)
3. Bratton Down (330 m)
4. Mockham Down (312 m)
5. Whitefield Hill (311 m)
6. Maundown Hill (307.3 m)
7. Stoodleigh Beacon (301 m)

== See also ==
- Moor
- Hope Bourne, author of Living On Exmoor (1963)
- Exmore in Virginia (US), named after Exmoor
