= Voley Castle =

Iron Age hill fort in Devon, England

Coordinates: 51.2019°N 3.9251°W

Voley Castle is an Iron Age hill fort situated close to Parracombe in north Devon, England. The fort is situated on a promontory on the eastern side of Heale Down, approximately 230 metres (750 ft) above sea level. It is close to another Iron Age hill fort at Beacon Castle. Voley Castle is a slight univallate hillfort, a rare type of hill fort found mainly in Devon, and is unusual for its type because it has an outer earthwork.

== Description ==
The site consists of an approximately circular enclosure with an internal diameter of 68 metres (223 ft), surrounded by a bank 12 metres (39 ft) wide and 1.7 metres (5.6 ft) high. Surrounding the bank is an outer ditch, partially filed in, which is 5.4 metres (18 ft) wide and 0.6 metres (2.0 ft) deep. The interior of the site is around 0.4 hectares (1 acre) in area and generally level, with traces of a platform on the west side and a circular depression in the southwest corner. In the south is an entrance to the enclosure with a causeway across the ditch. Outside the bank to the south and west is an outwork, made up of a second bank and ditch up to 65 metres (213 ft) long, with an entrance and causeway across the ditch in line with the main entrance. A modern fence runs north to south across the site just west of the entrance.

== Classification ==
Voley Castle is a type of hill fort known as a "slight univallate hillfort", which are defined as enclosures between 1 and 10 hectares (2 and 25 acres) in size situated on or close to hilltops with a single line of relatively small earthworks. These date from the late Bronze Age and early Iron Age, and are numerically and geographically rare, being mainly confined to Devon. Voley Castle is unusual for this type of fort because it has an outwork.

== Purpose ==
Voley Castle is located on a steep east facing slope overlooking the valley of the River Heddon, with uninterrupted views down the valley and north towards the sea. Its location is unusual for a hill fort, because it is on a level shelf around 45 metres (148 ft) below the steeply rising crest of Heale Down hill, meaning that it would be very difficult to defend. Rather than being a fort, it has been suggested that the site likely represents a defended farmstead. The enclosure may have been used for holding cattle or possibly growing crops, and the outwork has been suggested to be a cattle enclosure. There are eight similar sites in Exmoor, but Voley Castle is the only one in an indefensible position. It is very similar to the site at Sweetworthy, in the eastern part of Exmoor in Somerset, in terms of its location, size and appearance.
