= Broadsands Beach =

Cove in north Devon, England

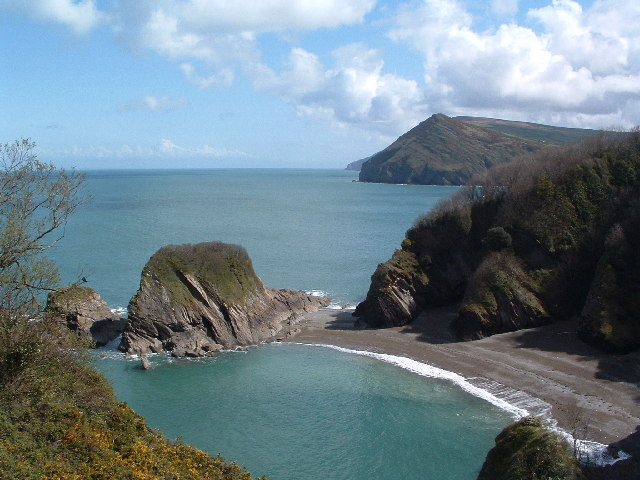
- Broadsands
- Location: Devon, England
- Coordinates: 51.2121°N 4.0585°W

Location
- Interactive map of Broadsands Beach

Broadsands Beach is the marketing name given to a small cove located in Watermouth, North Devon, England, originally known as Broadstrands Beach. It is owned by Watermouth Valley Camping Park. It is accessed by 220 cliff steps from the Old Ilfracombe to Combe Martin Coast Road. The beach has been awarded blue flag status.

== History ==
A landslide which destroyed the path in April 2025 closed access to the beach for the rest of the year.

== Gallery ==
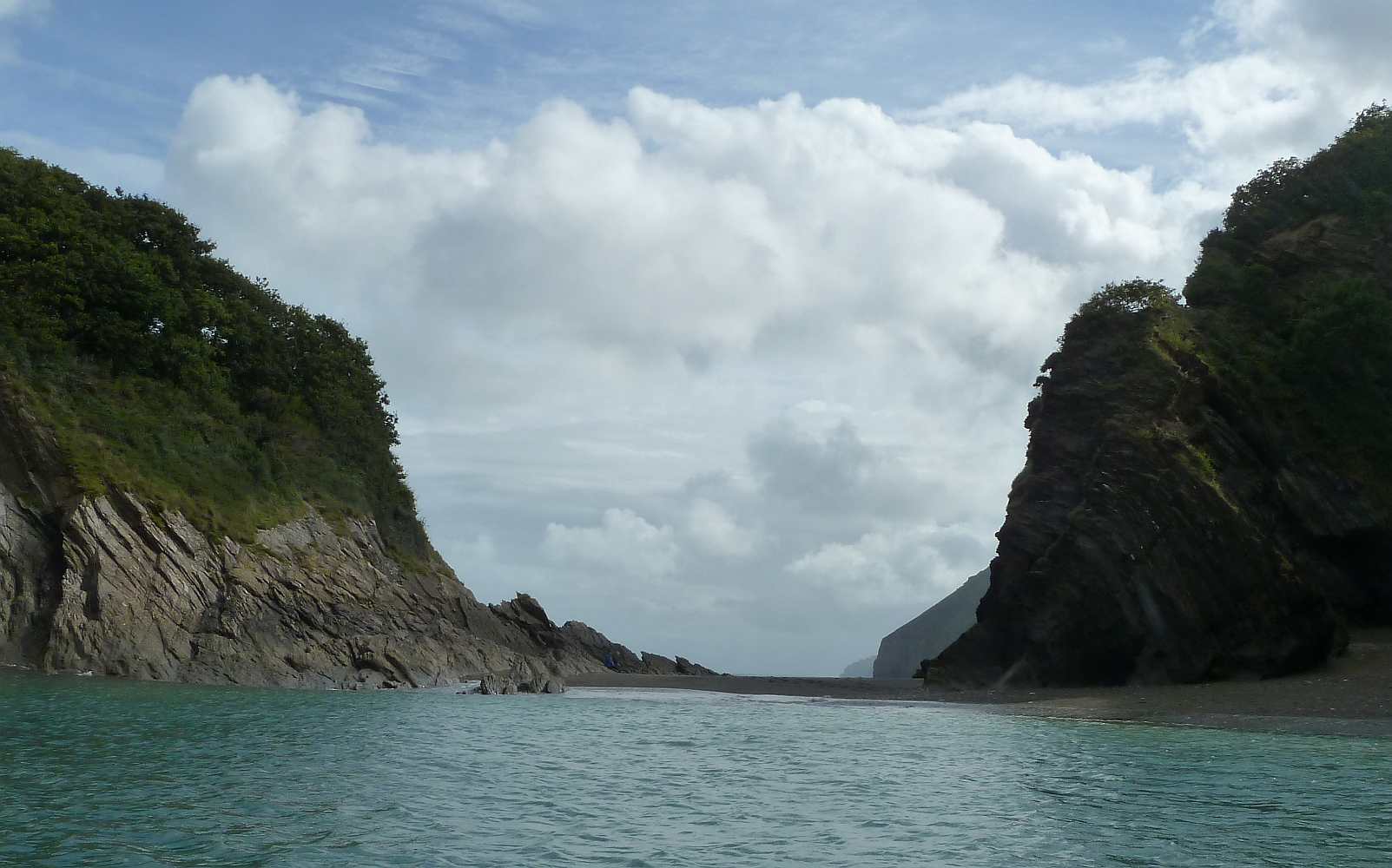
Tidal gap at Broadsands

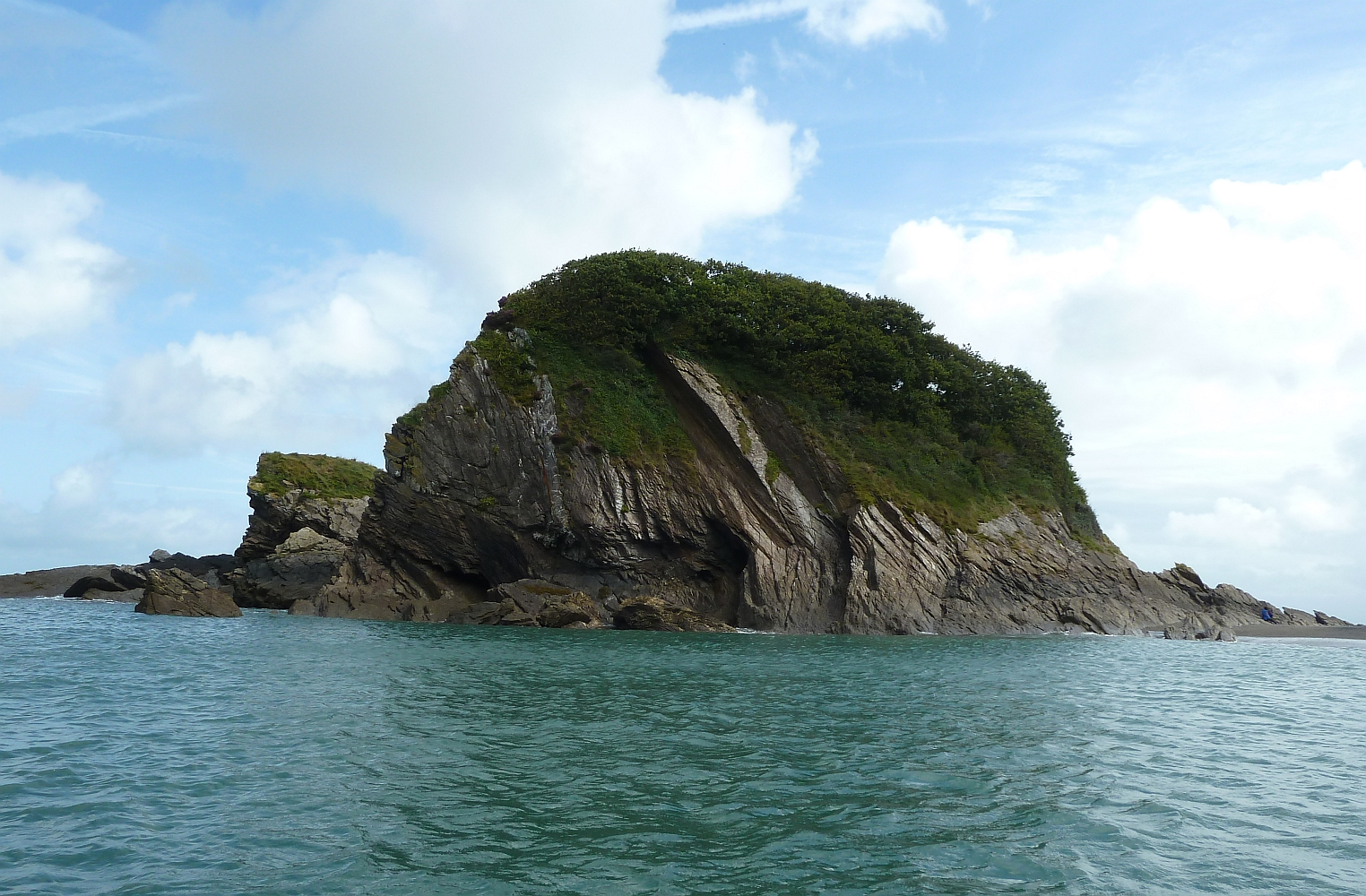
Inner and outer stone at Broadsands

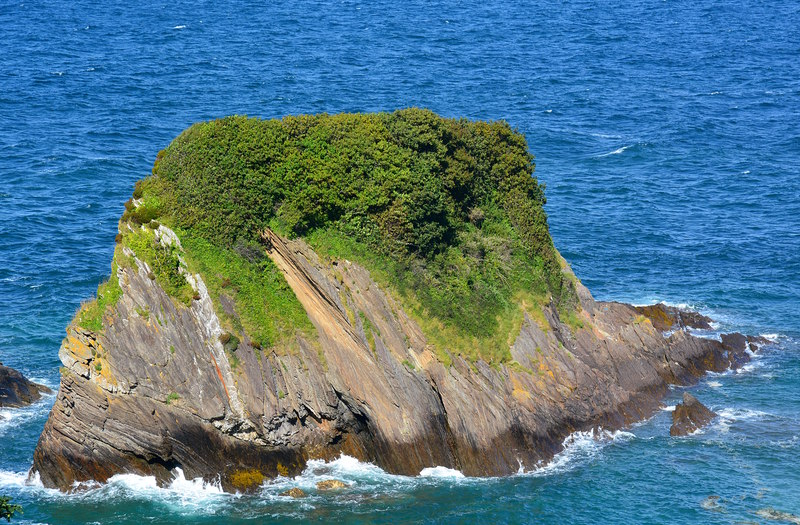
Outer stone

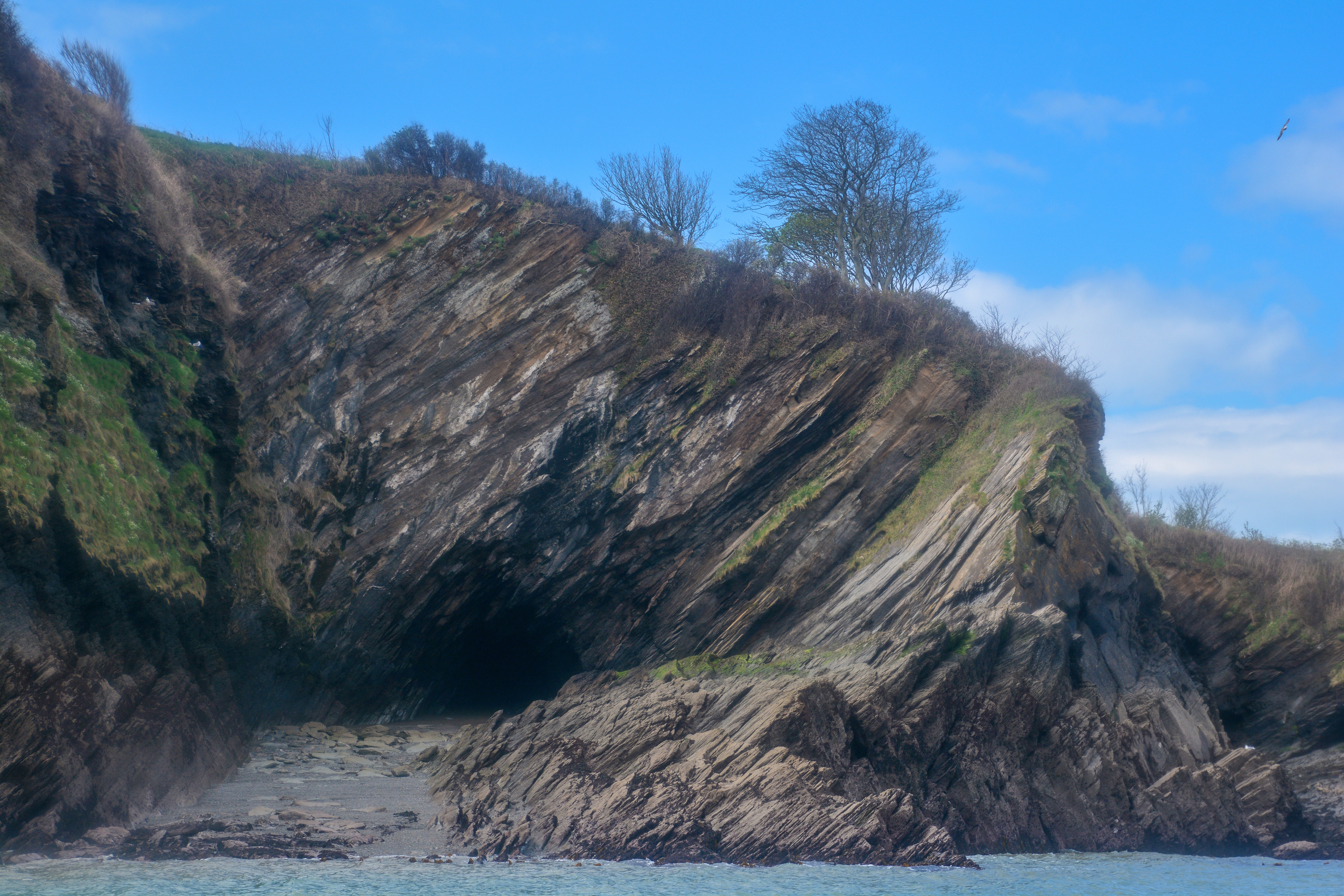
Rock formations
