= Watermouth Castle =

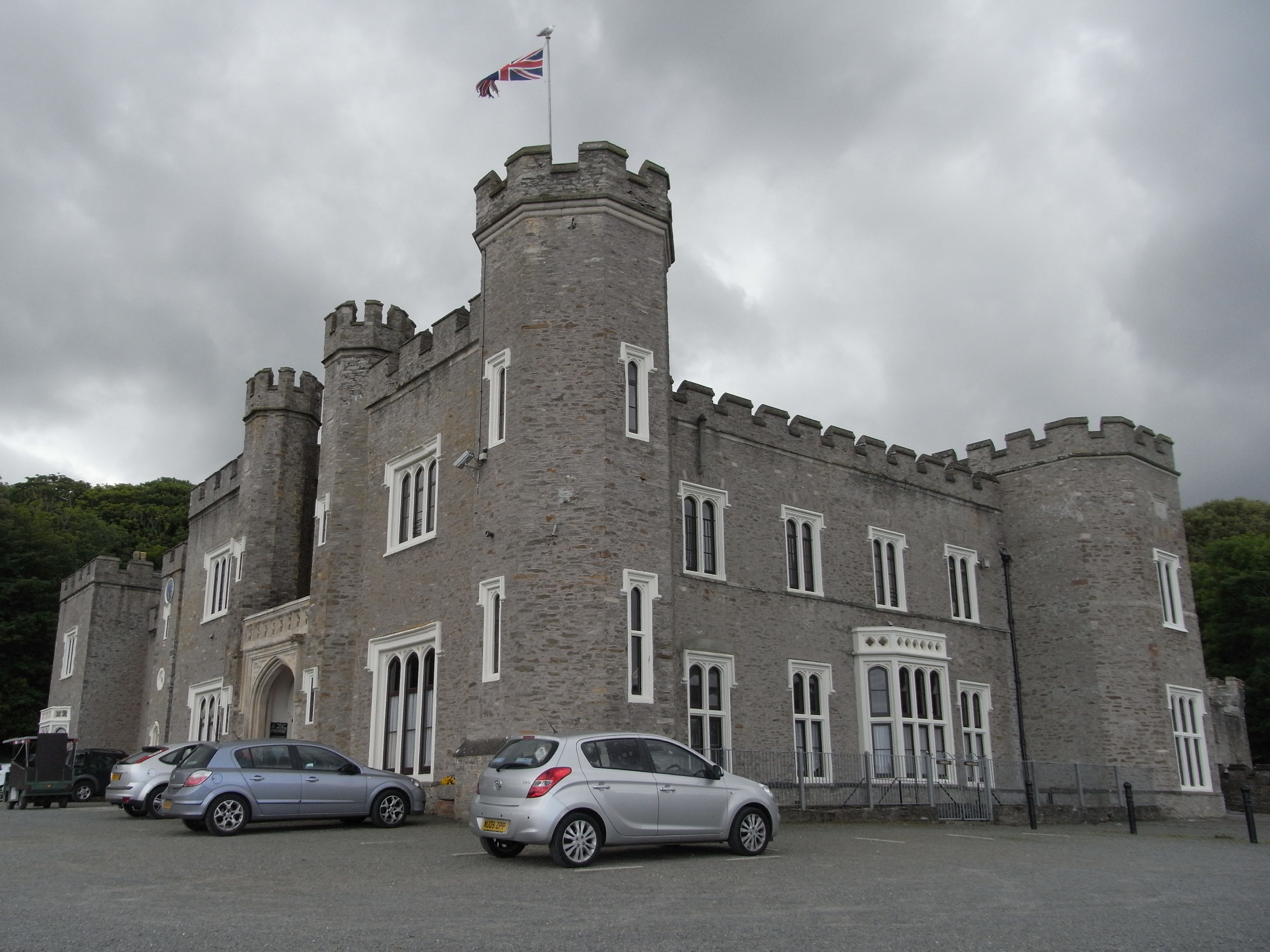
- Watermouth Castle, two principal fronts

- Location within Devon
- 51°12′48″N 4°04′49″W
- Location: Watermouth, Devon, England

History
- Built: 1825

Site notes
- Architect: George Wightwick

Listed Building – Grade II*
- Designated: 9 March 1953
- Reference no.: 1168686

Watermouth Castle is a building in Watermouth, near Ilfracombe, North Devon, England, later altered by George Wightwick as a residence for the Bassett family in the mid-19th century and is not a true castle but a country house built to resemble one. It has been designated as a Grade II* listed building.

Located near the shore of the inlet of Watermouth, near Ilfracombe, Devon, the castle houses a collection of Victorian antiques centred on domestic tools and amusement machines, a family theme park and holiday apartments. The Bassetts left the castle in 1945.

== Descent of ownership ==
=== Bassett ===
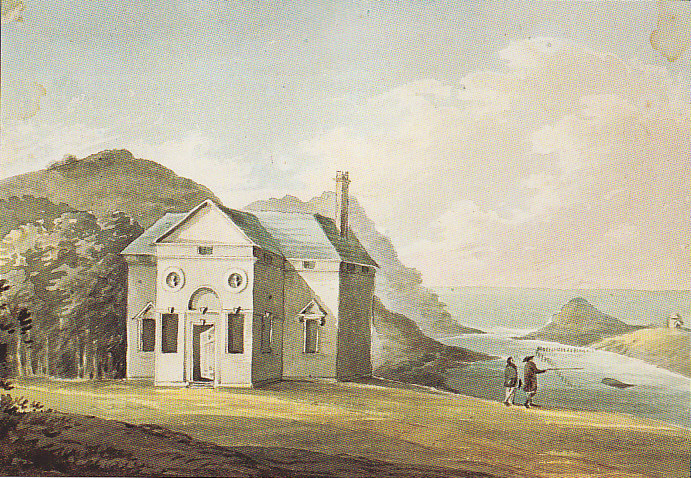
"Watermouth seat of (blank) Davie Esq." The Palladian house at Watermouth in 1796, built by Hugh Fortescue, 1st Earl of Clinton (1696–1751), as drawn by Rev. John Swete, before demolition and replacement by Watermouth Castle

The castle was built by Joseph Davie Bassett (1764–1846), son of John Davie (died 1793) of Orleigh Court, Buckland Brewer and his wife Eleanora Basset of Heanton Court, Heanton Punchardon. His brother was Rev. Charles Davie (1760–1836), rector of Heanton Punchardon, which advowson was possessed by the Bassett family.

After his mother became the sole heiress of her childless brother Francis Basset (died 1802), Joseph Davie adopted the name Bassett in lieu of his patronymic and adopted the Bassett armorials. He sold Orleigh in 1807 and built Watermouth Castle as his principal residence. He married Mary Irwin (1777–1862) of Barnstaple.

The Devon topographer Rev. John Swete visited Watermouth, before the construction of the Georgian castle, as part of his travels in 1796, and was entertained by Mr Davie. He painted the Palladian house then standing on the site and recorded the visit in his journal.

Joseph Bassett's eldest son and heir was Arthur Davie Bassett (1801–1870), who died in a horse-riding accident. He married Harriet Sarah Crawfurth, daughter of Thomas Smith Crawfurth of Dulverton, by whom he had his eldest surviving son Reverend Arthur Crawfurth Davie Bassett (1830–1880), who was unmarried and died at Watermouth Castle. His heir was his sister Harriet Mary Bassett, the wife of Charles Henry Williams (1834–1908), MP, of Pilton House, Pilton, near Barnstaple.

In 1908, the castle was inherited by their daughter Edith Bassett Bassett (1862–1943) (born Edith Basset Williams), married to Captain Ernest Charles Penn Curzon (1856–1938). During World War I she started to sell off the ancient Basset lands. Watermouth Castle had been used as a military hospital during World War I, and in the 1920s she started to sell the Berrynarbor farms and cottages. In 1942 she sold most of the contents of Watermouth Castle.

=== Black ===
After the sale of most of the estate, the castle was eventually sold in September 1946 to Ilfracombe hotel owner Mrs. L G Lewis, who upon purchase planned to convert the house into a hotel. It is unknown how long Lewis owned the castle, or how far her developments of the castle progressed, but by 1949 it had changed hands to its next owners, Mr Nathaniel Black and his wife Beatrice.

By this point, the castle was near derelict, with infestations of rats, bats, and dry rot and mould. The Blacks planned to restore the castle and donate the building and remaining grounds to the National Trust.

They spent the next three years funding this restoration by offering open tours of the castle and grounds for 2s. 6d, as well as selling guide books as well as a book of poems about the castle written by Mrs Black. However in 1952 they received a letter from the National Trust declining his "generous offer" due to lack of historical significance. The Blacks continued to live in the East wing of the castle and offer tours for a few more years, but due to mounting bills and the crippling cost of restoration, they eventually sold the castle and moved away.

=== Brain ===
The castle may have changed hands a few times after the departure of the Blacks; there were reports of it briefly being a children's home. But the castle was once again sold in 1958 to Mr J.C.T. Brain of Cheltenham for £5000. Brain built a number of brick chalets in the woods above the castle and converted the building itself into a series of 18 holiday flats. Some of the castle was left untouched as a museum exabit, including the main hall, and the dining room. Upon his death, the business was inherited by his two sons, who split the estate by keeping the lodges but selling off the castle.

=== Wickenden ===
The castle once again passed through the hands of many short-term owners and property speculators. By the mid 1960s the castle and grounds were once again open for tours. It is unknown all of the people who owned the castle through this time, but was last purchased by Keith Wickenden (1932–1983), a Conservative MP for Dorking South and businessman. He was killed in a light aircraft crash near Shoreham Airport in 1983.

=== Haines ===
Watermouth Castle was purchased from Wickenden in 1977 by Richard L. Haines of Market Deeping, Cambridgeshire and his wife. The price paid for the castle and 60 acres (24 hectares) was £50,000.

While the original plan was to convert the castle into a medieval themed hotel, plans shifted towards a tourist attraction during the restoration of the building. Six flats were built in the upstairs of the castle, the east wing was converted into a flat for the Haines family to live, the ground floor of the castle became a Victorian themed museum, the cellars were turned into craft shops for local trades to present their works, and a café was built in the castle courtyard. Eventually the attraction extended out into the gardens; play structures and rides were installed in the early 1980s. By the 1990s Watermouth Castle was running as a fully-fledged theme park and became one of North Devon's premier tourist destinations, welcoming around 95,000 guests a year. More was added every year, including a Gnome Village, animatronic shows, a fountain and light display backed by a vintage dance organ, and a number of theme park rides. Around the end of the 1990s the Haines family purchased Garden Cottage, situated behind the castle's Victorian gardens, and continued to expand the park over the land acquired with this sale. By 2016 the park had a total of nine theme park rides, including a lazy river purchased from Crinkley Bottom and a tobbogan ride bought from Windsor Safari Park. Richard Haines died on 11 June 2015, and the business was inherited by his two sons and their families.

=== The Escapade Group ===
In 2022 the park was sold to The Escapade Group, a business that operates a number of family attractions including soft plays, petting zoos, and adrenaline parks. Since the takeover the day to day running of the park has remained largely the same, and the comany have continued to expand the grounds into a childrens attraction.

== Current use ==
The castle is a tourist attraction open to the public by admission charge. Within the Castle, areas include Castle Treasure, Dungeon Labyrinths and The Watershow Extravaganza. Its grounds feature nine rides spread across themed areas known as Adventure Land, Merry go Land and Gnome Land.

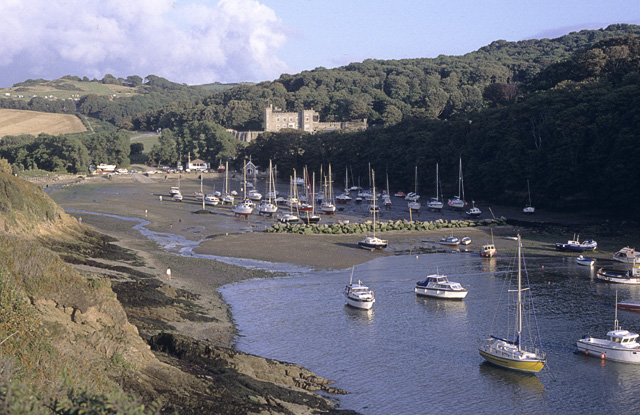
Bay and castle

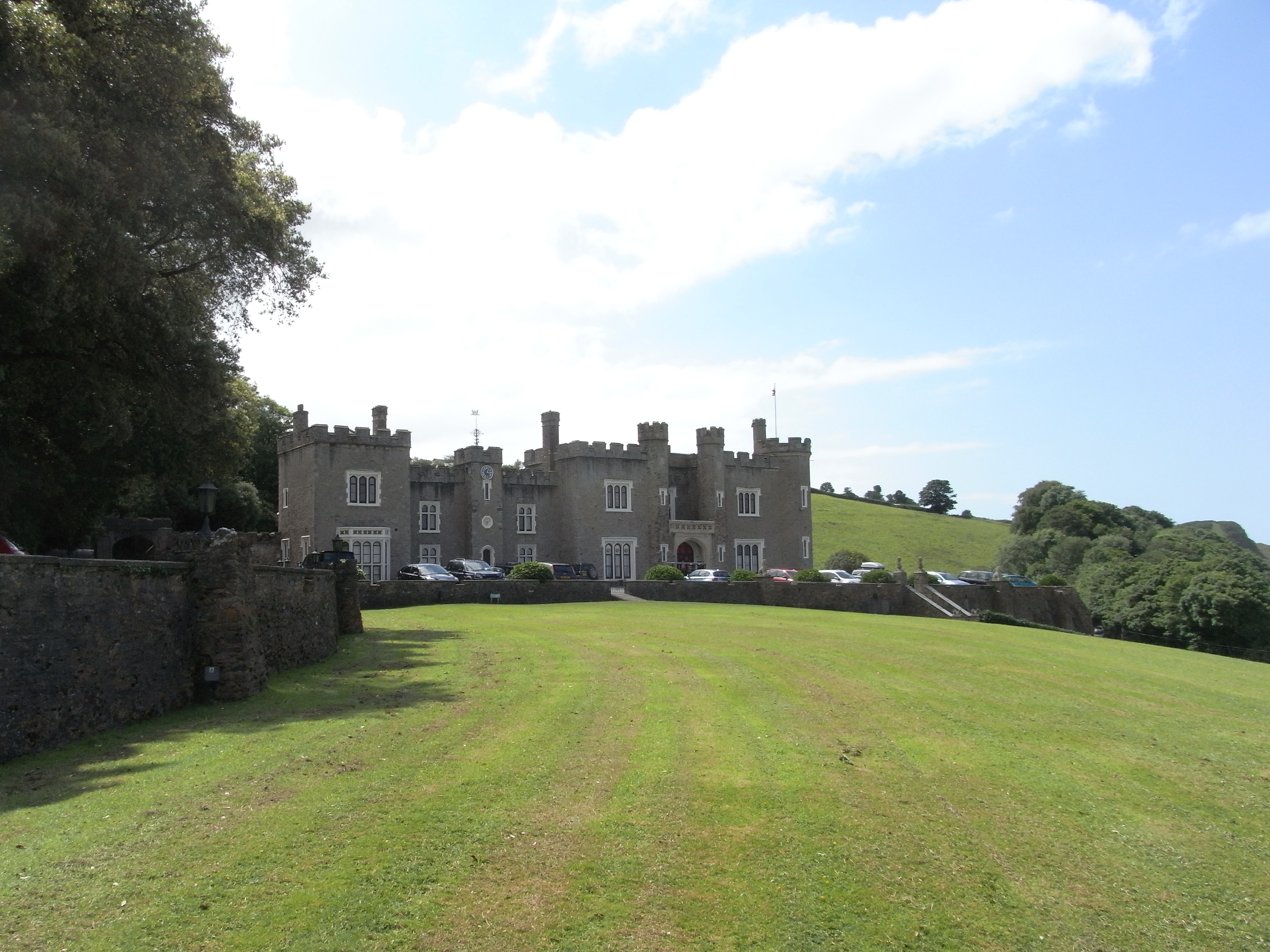
Entrance front

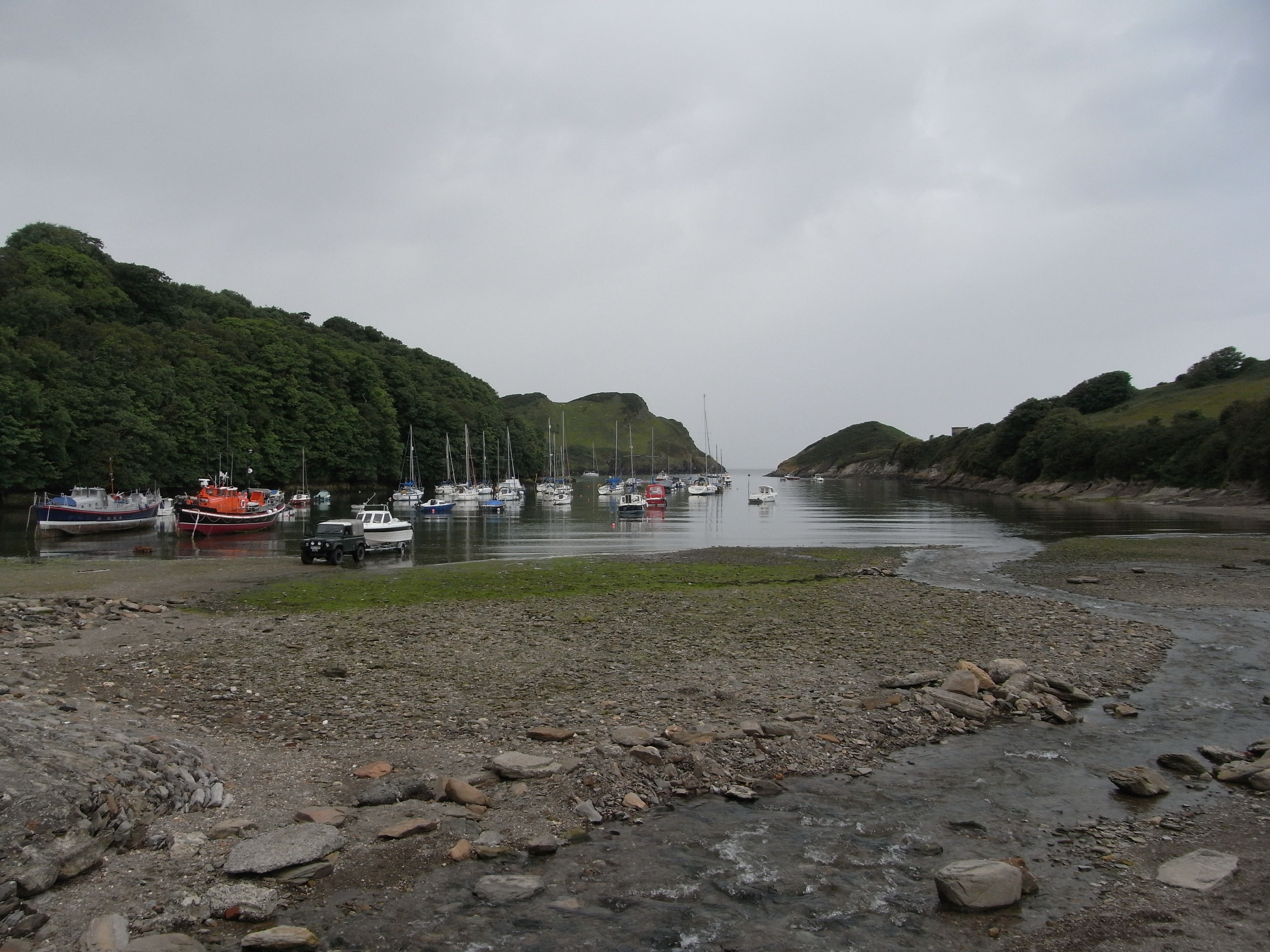
Watermouth Cove, viewed from beneath the castle

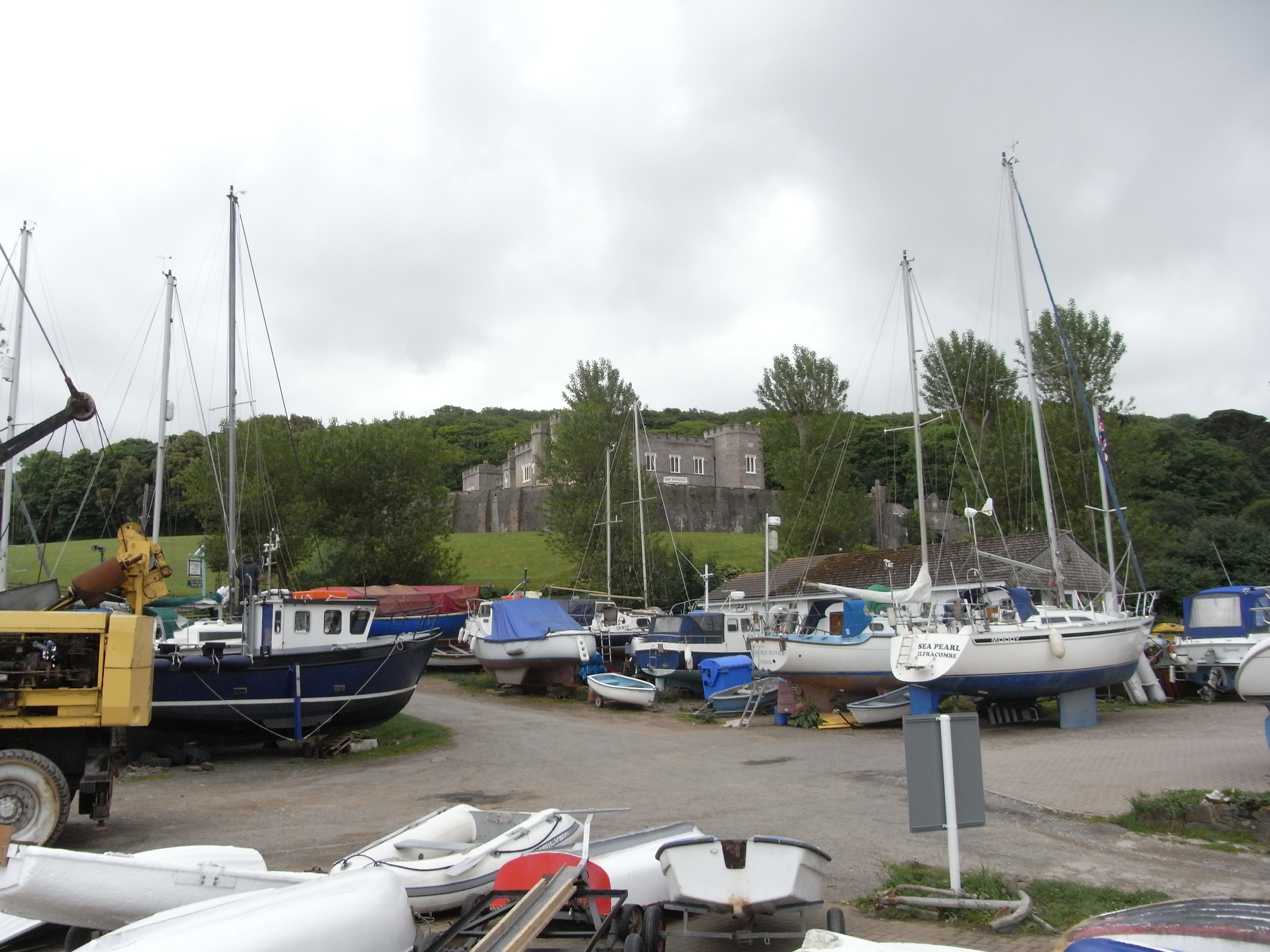
The castle viewed from the slipway of Watermouth Cove
