= Sexton =

Sexton may refer to:

== Places ==
=== Australia ===
- Sexton, Queensland, a rural locality in the Gympie Region

=== United Kingdom ===
- Sexton's Burrows, peninsula at the harbour of Watermouth Bay on the North Devon coast, England, United Kingdom

=== United States ===
- Sexton, Arkansas, United States, a former community
- Sexton, Indiana, United States, an unincorporated community
- Sexton, Iowa, United States, a former town
- Sexton Glacier, a glacier in Montana, United States

== People ==
- Sexton (surname), people with the surname Sexton
- Sexton Hardcastle, nickname for Adam Copeland, a pro wrestler

== Arts, entertainment, and media ==
- Sexton Blake (band), American band from Portland, Oregon
- Sexton Blake, a character who appeared in numerous penny dreadfuls

== Schools ==
- CBS Sexton Street, Christian Brothers Secondary School in Limerick, Ireland
- JW Sexton High School, Lansing, Michigan, United States

== Other uses ==
- Sexton (artillery), a self-propelled artillery vehicle of World War II
- Sexton (office), a church or synagogue officer charged with the maintenance of the church buildings and/or the surrounding graveyard; and ringing of the church bells
- The Sexton Irish Whiskey, a product of Proximo Spirits
- Sexton beetle, alternative name for the burying beetle
