= Beacon Castle =

Iron Age hill fort in England

Coordinates: 51.1977°N 3.9127°W

Beacon Castle is an Iron Age hill fort close to Parracombe in Devon, England. It is situated on a hilltop some 290 metres (950 ft) above sea level, overlooking the Heddon Valley.
