= Parracombe =

Village in Devon, England

Coordinates: 51.18774°N 3.90879°W

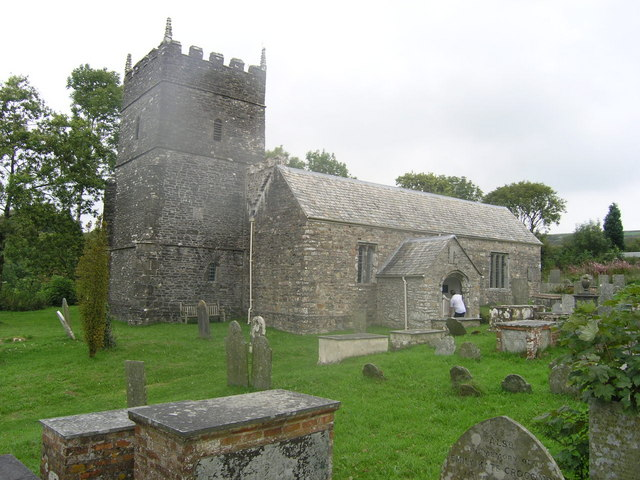
St Petrock's Church

Parracombe is a rural settlement 4 miles (6 km) south-west of Lynton, in Devon, England. It is situated in the Heddon Valley, on Exmoor. The population at the 2011 census was 293.

A number of Bronze Age barrows exist nearby, along with several other small earthworks throughout the parish. Beacon Castle and Voley Castle, both Iron Age Hill forts, are situated nearby. Rowley Barton ("rough clearing") was a manor mentioned in the Domesday Book of 1086, along with East and West Middleton.

Holwell Castle at Parracombe was a Norman motte and bailey castle built to guard the junction of the east–west and north–south trade routes, enabling movement of people and goods and the growth of the population. Alternative explanations for its construction suggest it may have been constructed to obtain taxes at the River Heddon bridging place, or to protect and supervise silver mining in the area around Combe Martin. It was 40 metres (130 ft) in diameter and 6.2 metres (20 ft) high above the bottom of a rock-cut ditch, which is 2.7 metres (8 ft 10 in) deep. It was built in the late 11th or early 12th century.

Parracombe's St Petrock's Church is now in the care of the Churches Conservation Trust.

Until 1935 the village was served by a halt on the Lynton & Barnstaple Railway which ran close to the centre of the settlement.
