= Kentisbury Down =

Iron Age hill fort in Devon, England

Coordinates: 51.1789°N 3.9514°W

Kentisbury Down is the location of an Iron Age enclosure or hill fort situated close to Blackmore Gate on the edge of Exmoor in Devon, England. The enclosure—a simple 'round'—is situated on the southeast slope of the down above the ancient crossroads at approx 320 metres above sea level.
