= Flag of Exmoor =

Exmoor
- Proportion: 3:5
- Adopted: 29 October 2014
- Designed by: Jenny Stevens

The Exmoor flag is the flag of the moorland area of Exmoor, in west Somerset and north Devon. It was registered with the Flag Institute as a regional flag on 29 October 2014.

== Design ==
The stag's head stands for the moorland's iconic wildlife, particularly its red deer. The star symbolises Exmoor National Park's status as Europe's first designated International Dark Sky Reserve, awarded in 2011. The dark blue field is for both the sky and sea. The wavy lines of white, purple and green represent Exmoor as a place where the sea meets cliffs, moorland and forests, as well as the region's many footpaths.

The Pantone colours for the flag are:

- Blue 286
- White
- Purple 258
- Green 348

== Competition ==
In 2014, it was announced that a competition to create an official flag for Exmoor would be held, to coincide with the 60th anniversary of the establishment of the Exmoor National Park in 1954. The competition was launched on 16 June 2014, and ran until 21 July. In total, 261 designs were submitted for the competition, with some entries coming from as far afield as Australia and the United States.

A panel of eight judges reviewed the proposals before ultimately selecting a shortlist of five (in a divergence from the original plan to end the competition with four finalists), which were put to a public vote on 20 August 2014, with voting remaining open until 10 September. 858 votes were cast in total.

The winning design was unveiled on 29 October, at a ceremony at Minehead railway station. The designer was London resident Jenny Stevens.

=== Finalists ===
Design A: Jamie Loudon

Design B: Martin Shoots

Design C: Kathryn Roseveare

Design D: Kevin Sandiford

Design E: Jenny Stevens

== See also ==
- Flag of Devon
- Flag of Somerset
