= St Petrock's Church, Parracombe =

Church in Devon, England

St Petrock's Church
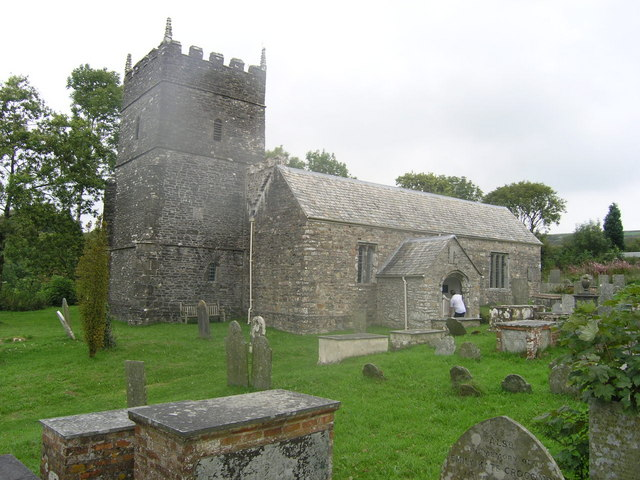

- Location within Devon
- 51°11′18″N 3°53′52″W
- Location: Parracombe, Devon, England

History
- Built: 13th century

Listed Building – Grade I
- Official name: Church of St. Petrocks
- Designated: 25 February 1965
- Reference no.: 1325740

St Petrock's Church in Parracombe, Devon, England was built in the 13th century. It is recorded in the National Heritage List for England as a designated Grade I listed building, and is now a redundant church in the care of the Churches Conservation Trust. It was declared redundant on 25 November 1969, and was vested in the Trust on 23 June 1971.

The church is dedicated to St Petrock. Parts of the building, including the chancel and the lower part of the tower remain from the 13th century, but much of the current fabric dates from a reconstruction in the early 16th century.

In 1879 there were worries about the stability of the building, however protests led by John Ruskin, who donated £10, led to the preservation of the church and the construction of a new one further west in the village.

The interior includes 18th-century box pews, a Georgian pulpit and a screen with a wooden tympanum above it which dates from the 18th century.

== Gallery ==
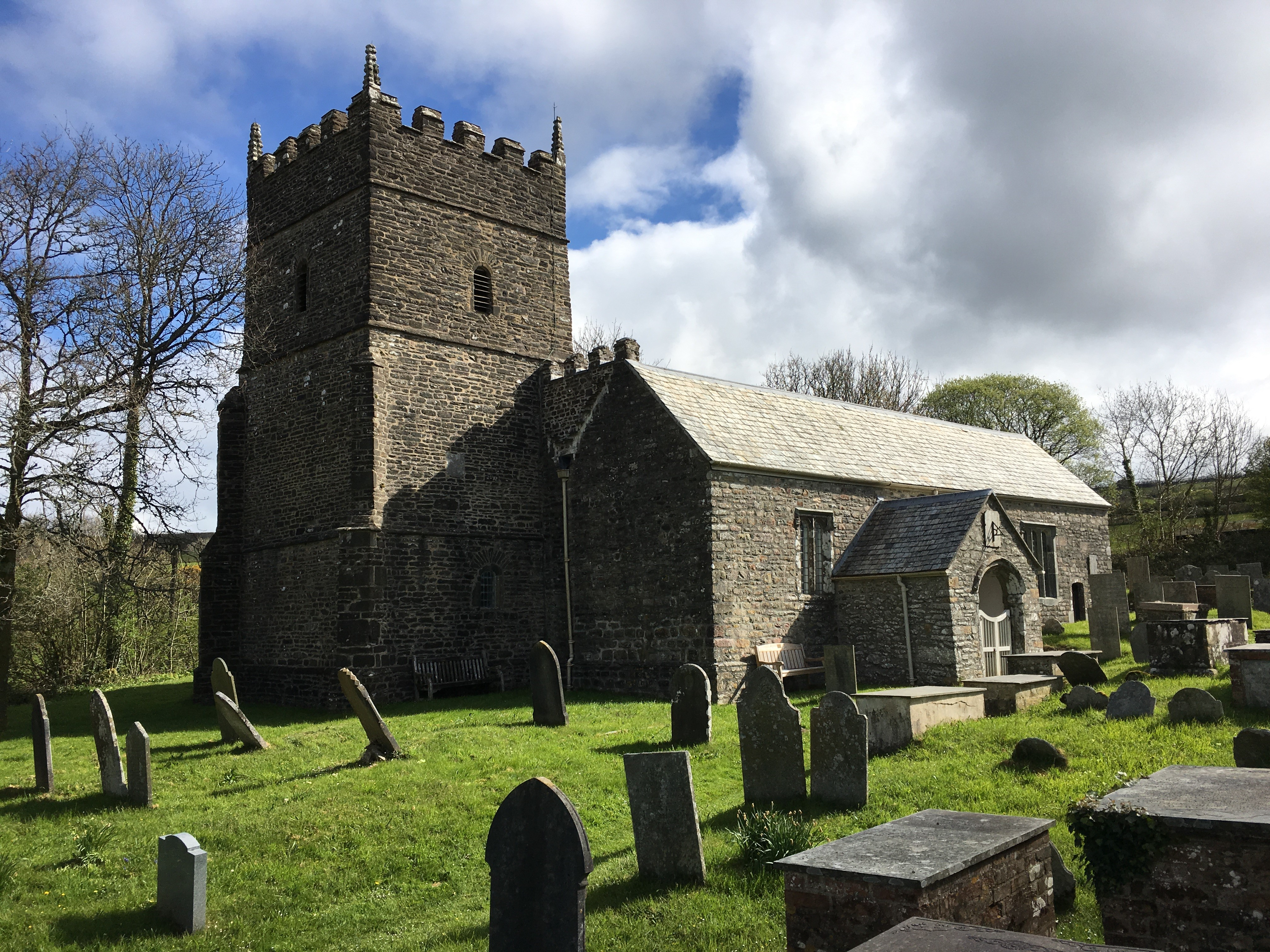
The exterior of St Petrock's from the southwest

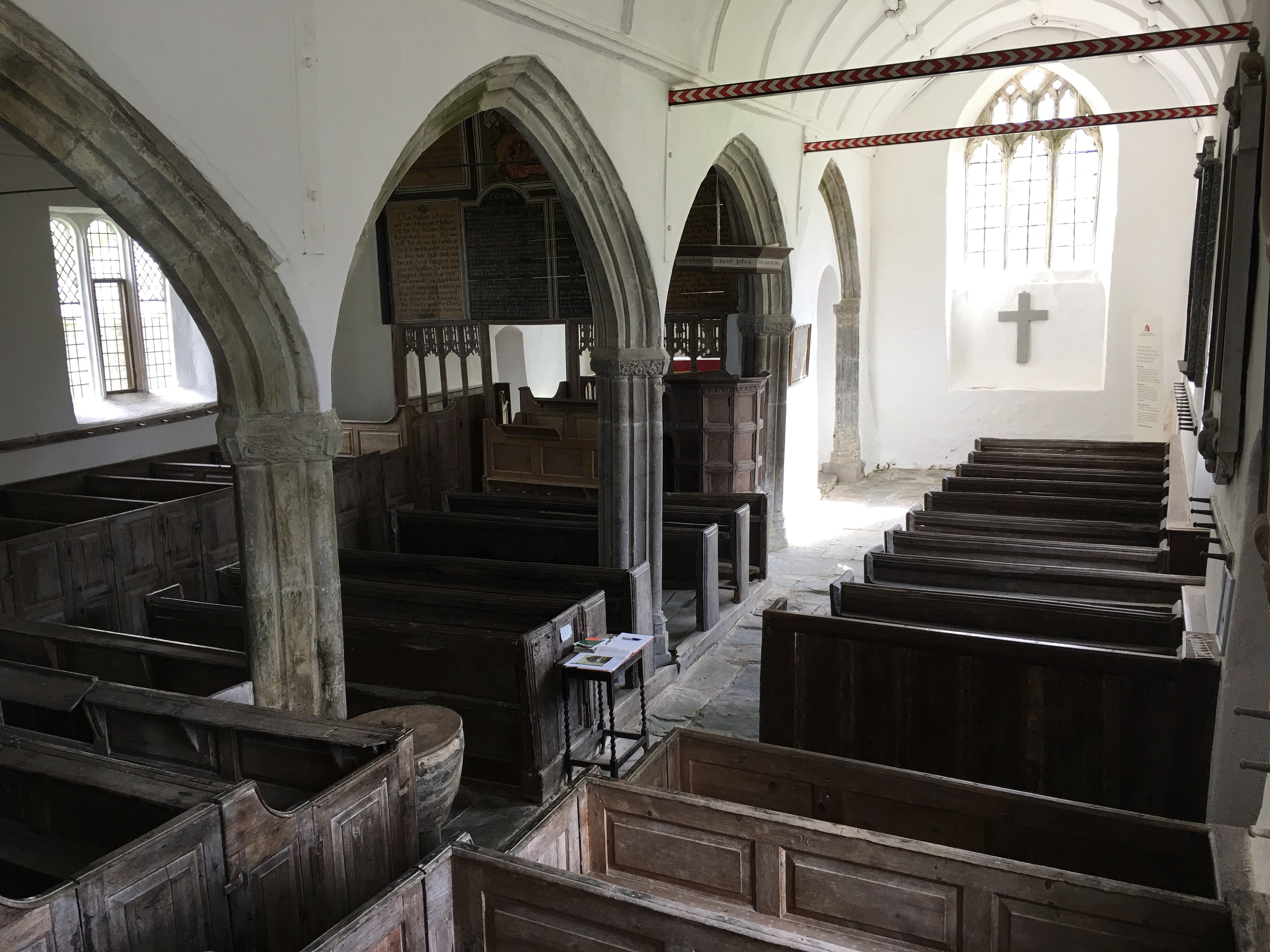
The interior of St Petrock's from the back of the south aisle

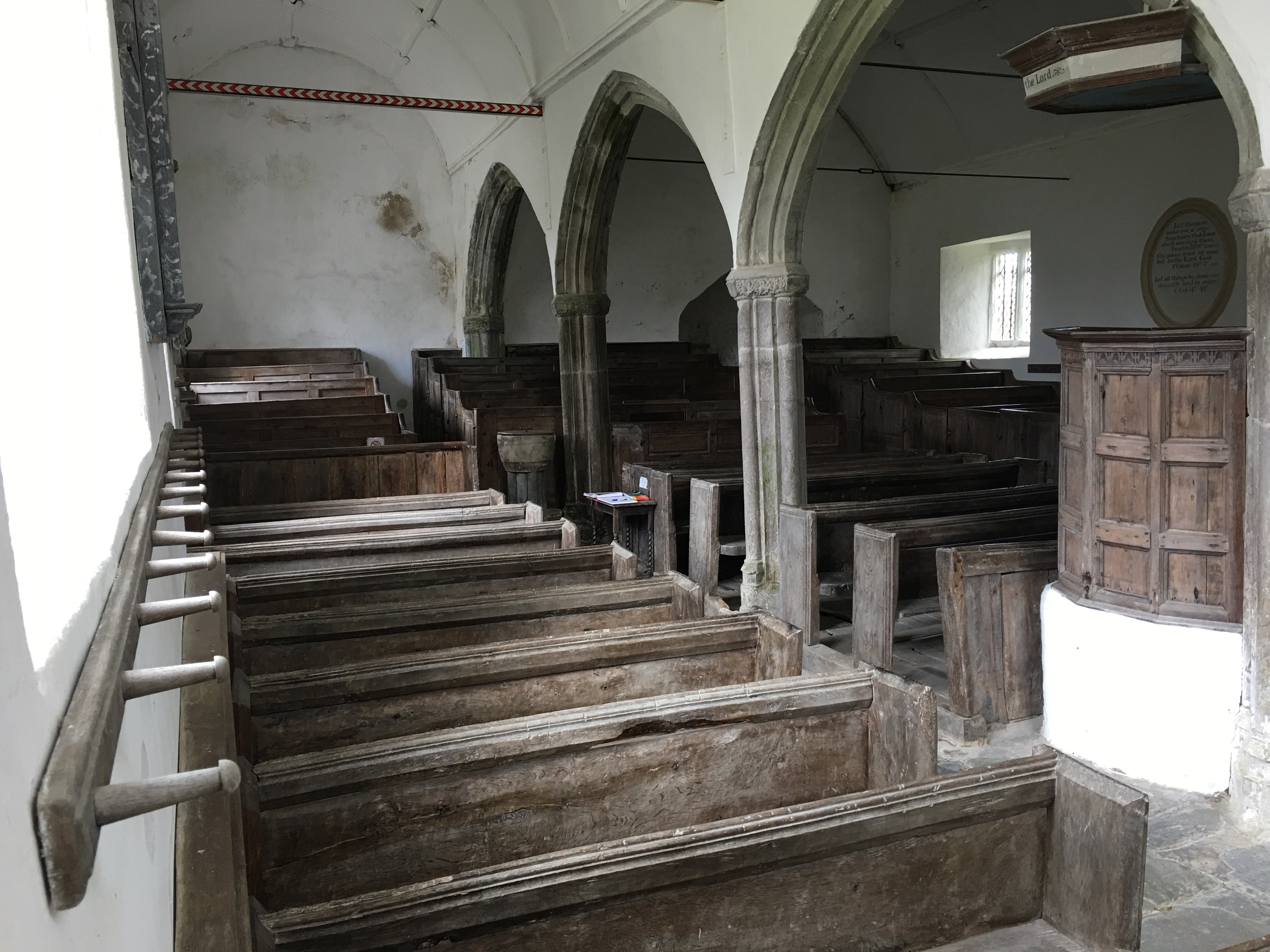
The interior of St Petrock's from the front of the south aisle. Note the hat pegs on the wall on the left

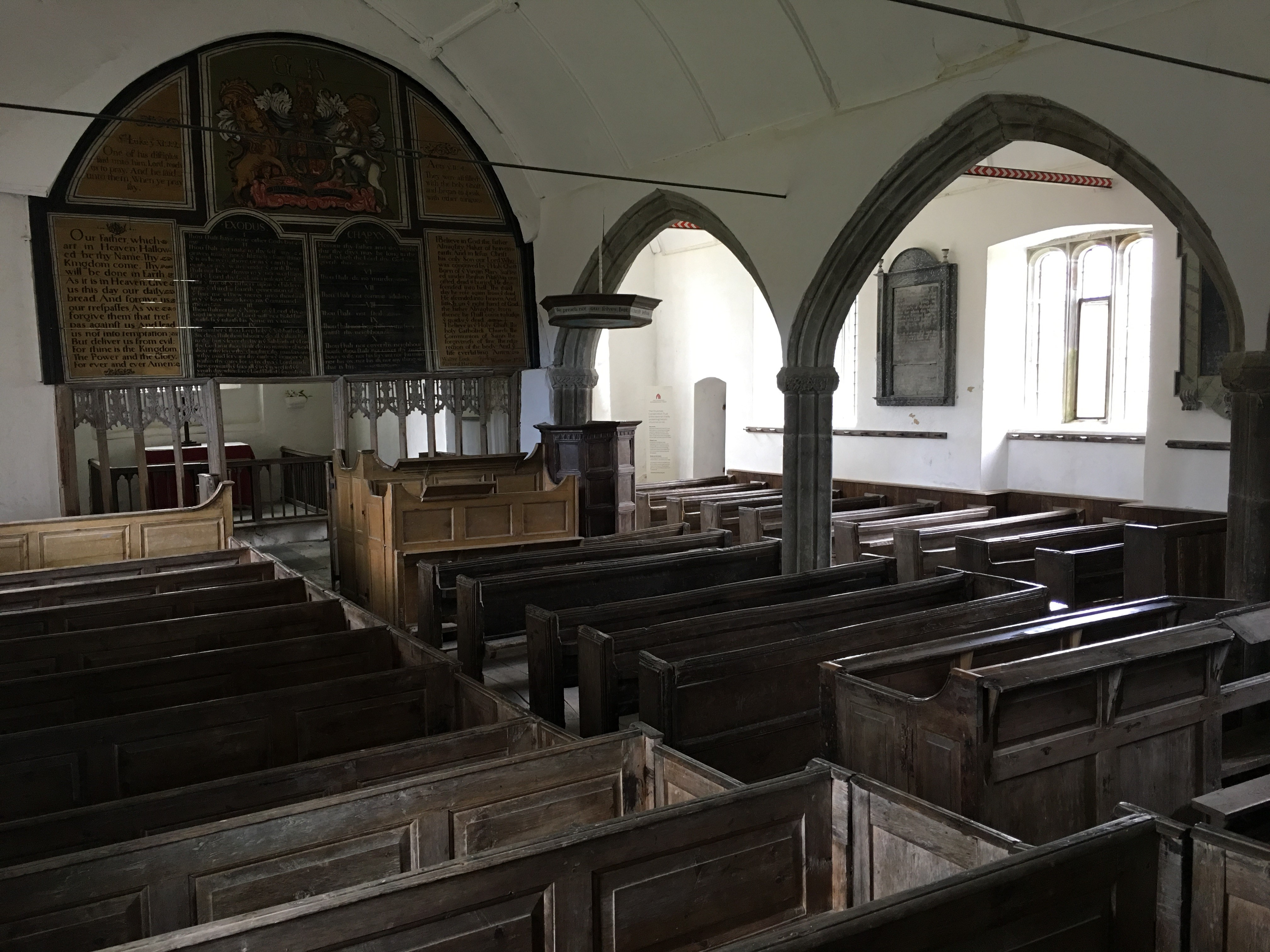
The interior of St Petrock's from the back of the nave

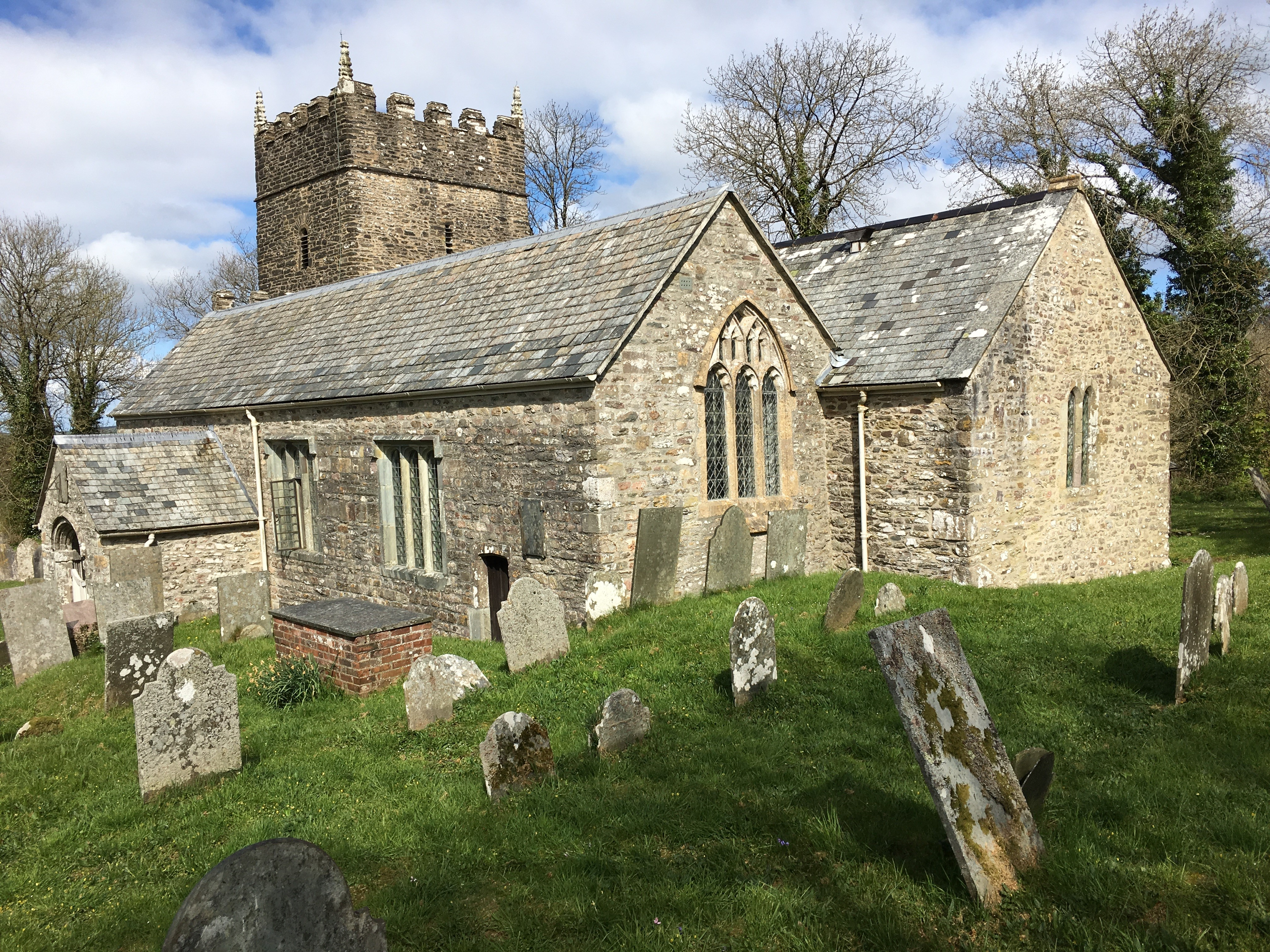
The exterior of St Petrock's from the southeast

== See also ==
- List of churches preserved by the Churches Conservation Trust in South West England
