= South Exmoor SSSI =

Protected area in Devon and Somerset, England

South Exmoor
- Site of Special Scientific Interest
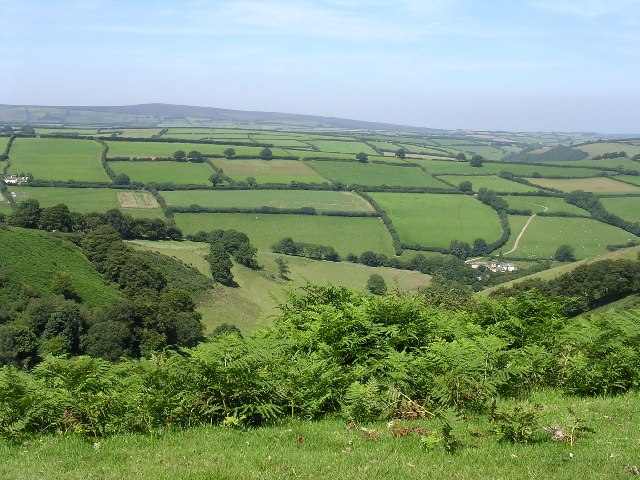

- Location within Somerset
- Location of South Exmoor.
- Area of search: Somerset & Devon
- Grid reference: SS880340
- Coordinates: 51.09434°N 3.60075°W
- Interest: Biological
- Area: 3,132.7 hectares (31.327 km^{2}; 12.095 sq mi)
- Notification date: 1992

South Exmoor (grid reference SS880340) is a 3132.7 hectare (7742.3 acre) biological Site of Special Scientific Interest in Devon and Somerset, England, notified in 1992.

The site consists of several fragments of land on the south side of Exmoor. In Devon the site includes Barcombe Down and North Molton Ridge, southeast of South Radworthy, Molland Common, north of Molland, and West Ansty and East Ansty Commons. In Somerset the site includes Brightworthy Barrows and part of Withypool Common, Winsford Hill and Haddon Hill, all within the Exmoor National Park. The site contains extensive areas of heathland including lowland communities which are only found in South West England and South Wales. The River Barle and its tributaries flow through parts of the site and submerged plants such as alternate watermilfoil (Myriophyllum alterniflorum) are abundant. There are small areas of semi-natural woodland within the site, including some which are ancient. The most abundant tree species is sessile oak (Quercus petraea), the shrub layer is very sparse and the ground flora includes bracken, bilberry and a variety of mosses. The heaths have strong breeding populations of whinchat (Saxicola rubetra) and European stonechat (Saxicola rubicola). northern wheatear (Oenanthe oenanthe) are common near stone boundary walls and other stony places. Grasshopper warbler (Locustella naevia) breed in scrub and tall heath. Trees on the moorland edges provide nesting sites for common redpoll (Acanthis flammea), common buzzard (Buteo buteo) and common raven (Corvus corax).
