= Hope Bourne =

English painter and writer (1918-2010)

- Born: 26 August 1918; Oxford, Oxfordshire, England
- Died: 8 August 2010 (aged 91); Withypool, Somerset, England
- Known for: Painting, Writing
- Notable work: Living on Exmoor

Hope Lillian Bourne (26 August 1918 – 22 August 2010) was an English self-sufficient writer, known as the "Lady of Exmoor."

== Biography ==
Bourne was born on 26 August 1918 in Oxford, Oxfordshire. She lived with her widowed mother in Hartland, Devon, where her mother worked as the headmistress of a village school, until she was in her 30s.

After her mother died, Bourne moved to live alone in primitive cottages and a caravan on the open moorlands of Exmoor. She survived by becoming self-sufficient through growing her own vegetables, fishing, and hunting for rabbits. She became known locally as the "Lady of Exmoor." She joined the Exmoor Society in 1959.

Bourne wrote five books about Exmoor, one novel set in North Devon and contributed a weekly column to The West Somerset Free Press. She was the subject of three television documentaries, including About Britain: Hope Bourne Alone on Exmoor (1978) and Hope Bourne - Woman of Exmoor (1981), which brought her to national attention.

In 1994, Bourne moved to Withypool, Somerset.

== Death ==
Bourne died on 22 August 2010 in Withypool, Somerset. She had never married or had children and her estate was left to the Exmoor Society. This included artwork, writings, journals and correspondence.

== Legacy ==
In 2014, the unpublished manuscript "A Village of the Moor" by Bourne, which had previously been lost for 45 years, was found in the old storeroom of the Exmoor Society by Dr Helen Blackman during a move to new premises. It has been described as "an eloquent insight into village life in the late 1960s." The book was published in 2015.

In 2018, the Exmoor Society celebrated the centenary of her birth by publishing a short anthology of her lesser-known writings, titled Hope Bourne’s Reflections in Words.
