= Sexton's Burrows =

Peninsula which forms a natural breakwater on the North Devon coast

Coordinates: 51.2172°N 4.0754°W

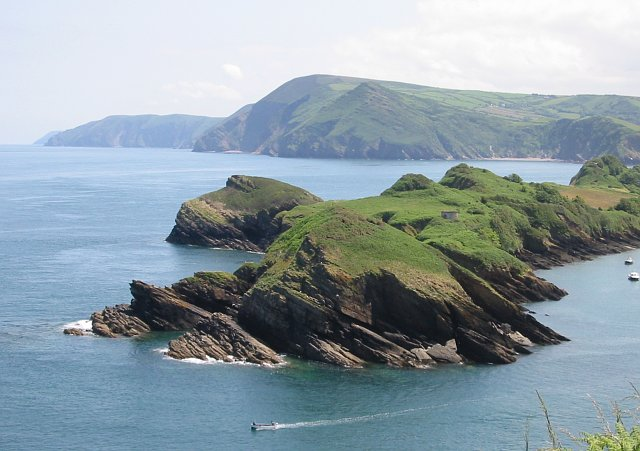
This photograph was taken from Widmouth Head looking east. In the distance, the shoreline shows the very high cliffs where Exmoor meets the sea.

Sexton's Burrows is a narrow rocky peninsula which forms a natural breakwater to the Harbour of Watermouth Bay on the North Devon coast.
