= Whiteface Dartmoor =

Breed of sheep

The Whiteface Dartmoor is a breed of domestic sheep originating in the Dartmoor region of south west England. The Rare Breeds Survival Trust has designated this breed as "at risk".

== Characteristics ==
The Whiteface is a traditional hill sheep. It has been raised on the hills of Dartmoor, grazing heather during the summer and the valley hay meadows during winter and spring. The majority of flocks still live and thrive on the moor to this day. Consequently, this breed is quite hardy and survives well on poor forage. Rams and ewes are horned but this trait seems to be disappearing in recent years. Average fleece weight for a ewe is 6 to 6.5 kg (13 to 14 lb) and it is classified as a longwool, which is unusual for an upland breed. It is raised primarily for meat.
