= Heddon's Mouth =

Cove in Devon, England

Coordinates: 51°13′45″N 3°55′39″W

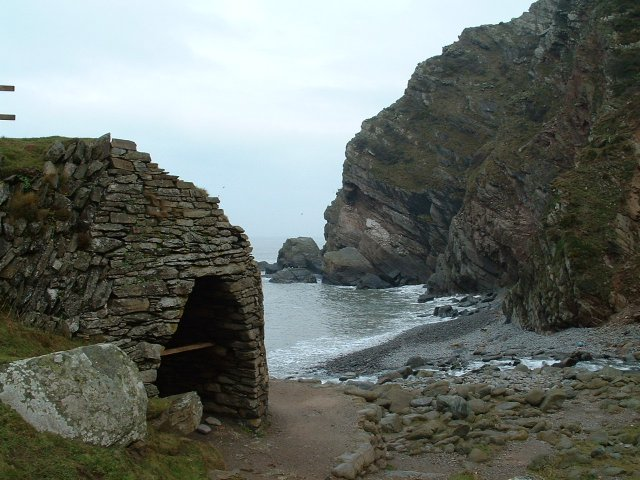
Heddon's Mouth

Heddon's Mouth is a rocky cove on the coast of North Devon, England, about 1 mile (1.6 km) down the River Heddon from the Hunter's Inn. It is preserved for the nation by the National Trust. It is a popular destination for Ramblers.

On its western edge are the remains of a nineteenth century lime kiln. The valley immediately landwards of the beach has steep slopes to its east and west, with the hills climbing over 200 metres (660 ft) in altitude within 500 metres (1,600 ft) of the river. The remains of a Roman fortlet are visible on the hilltop to the east.

In previous times it was a popular venue for smugglers. In 1885 a Mr E.D. Weedon was awarded the Royal Humane Society’s Bronze Medal for saving the life of Mr T. Groves at the locality. In 1923 a pleasure steamer that had just left Ilfracombe broke its rudder and began to drift out to sea, but was towed to the cove and its 400 passengers safely decanted.

The cove is so isolated that during World War II, a German U-Boat captain was able to allow his men ashore in search of fresh water supplies and relaxation without fear of detection.
