= Mockham Down =

Iron Age hill fort in Devon, England

Coordinates: 51.106°N 3.908°W

Mockham Down is the site of an Iron Age hill fort close to Brayfordhill in Devon, England. It takes the form of a multi-ditch and rampart enclosure close to the top of the hill known as Mockham Down at an elevation of 310 m (1,020 ft). There is a smaller enclosure 2 km (1.2 mi) to the west on the next hill at an elevation of 265 m (869 ft).
