= Wickenden =

Wickenden is a surname. Notable people with the surname include:

- Keith Wickenden (1932–1983), English politician
- William Wickenden (c. 1614 – 1671), American Baptist minister
- William E. Wickenden (1882–1947), American educator

== See also ==
- Lake Wickenden, a lake on Anticosti Island, in North Shore, Quebec, Canada
- Wickenden Street, a road in Providence, Rhode Island, United States
