= River Heddon =

River in Devon, England

Coordinates: 51°11′N 3°54′W

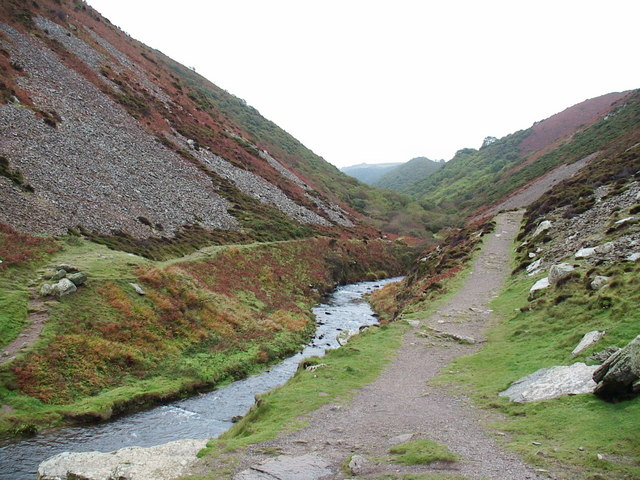
- Looking south up the River Heddon near Heddon's Mouth

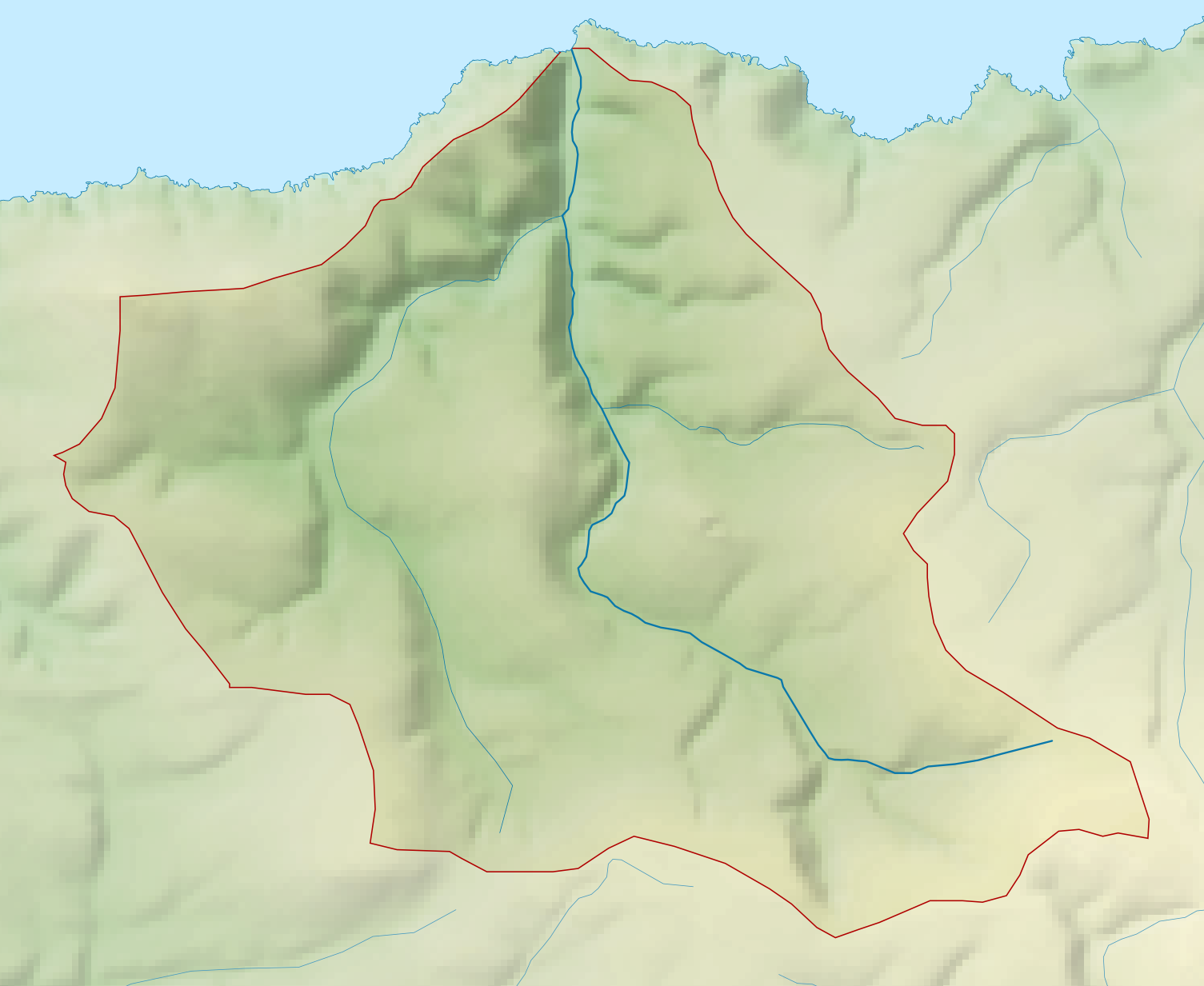
- Map of the river and its catchment

Location
- Country: England
- County: Devon

Physical characteristics
- Mouth: Heddon's Mouth
  - location: Bristol Channel
- Length: 8.8 kilometres (5.5 mi)
- Basin size: 17.07 square kilometres (6.59 sq mi)

The River Heddon is a river in Devon, in the south of England. Running along the western edges of Exmoor, the river reaches the North Devon coast at Heddon's Mouth. The named river flows for 8.8 kilometres (5.5 mi) and drains an area of 17.07 square kilometres (6.59 sq mi).

The Heddon Valley is renowned for its natural environment, with bridges and stepping stones along the river, meadows, and walks which start from the National Trust shop and information centre which has been in the ownership of the National Trust since 1963.

The Lynton & Barnstaple Railway once ran through part of the valley, halting at the small village of Parracombe.

== Heddon's Mouth ==
The cobbled beach at Heddon's Mouth is approximately 300 metres (980 ft) wide. It is only accessible through footpaths on the National Trust land or via the South West Coast Path and the nearest road access to the beach is at Hunter's Inn, approximately 1.6-kilometre (1 mi) south of sea-fall.

== See also ==
- Rivers of the United Kingdom
