= Watermouth =

Bay and hamlet in Devon, England

Coordinates: 51°12′53″N 4°04′14″W

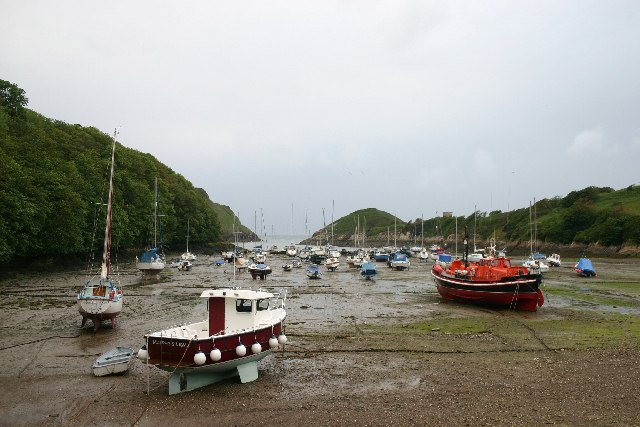
Watermouth Harbour

Watermouth is a sheltered bay and hamlet between Hele Bay and Combe Martin on the North Devon coast of England. The settlement's castle, named as Watermouth Castle, is currently used being as a theme park. Watermouth harbour is shielded by the natural breakwater of Sexton's Burrows. Watermouth Valley Camping Park can be found in Watermouth.
