= List of United Kingdom locations: Com-Cor =

The United Kingdom

This is part of the list of United Kingdom locations: a gazetteer of place names in the United Kingdom showing each place's locality and geographical coordinates.

== Co (continued) ==
=== Com ===
Location	Locality	Coordinates (links to map & photo sources)	OS grid reference
Combe	East Sussex	51.02°N 00.30°E	TQ6228
Combe	Somerset	51.03°N 02.84°W	ST4127
Combe (Salcombe)	Devon	50.22°N 03.81°W	SX7138
Combe (Yealmpton)	Devon	50.34°N 04.05°W	SX5452
Combe (Buckfastleigh)	Devon	50.49°N 03.83°W	SX7068
Combe	Herefordshire	52.26°N 02.96°W	SO3463
Combe	Oxfordshire	51.83°N 01.40°W	SP4115
Combe	Berkshire	51.33°N 01.47°W	SU3760
Combe Almer	Dorset	50.77°N 02.07°W	SY9597
Combebow	Devon	50.66°N 04.15°W	SX4887
Combe Common	Surrey	51.10°N 00.64°W	SU9535
Combe Down	Bath and North East Somerset	51.35°N 02.34°W	ST7662
Combe Fishacre	Devon	50.46°N 03.63°W	SX8464
Combe Florey	Somerset	51.07°N 03.21°W	ST1531
Combe Hay	Bath and North East Somerset	51.32°N 02.38°W	ST7359
Combeinteignhead	Devon	50.52°N 03.55°W	SX9071
Combe Martin	Devon	51.19°N 04.03°W	SS5846
Combe Moor	Herefordshire	52.26°N 02.93°W	SO3663
Combe Pafford	Devon	50.48°N 03.53°W	SX9166
Combe Raleigh	Devon	50.81°N 03.20°W	ST1502
Comberbach	Cheshire	53.28°N 02.54°W	SJ6477
Comberford	Staffordshire	52.66°N 01.72°W	SK1907
Comberton	Herefordshire	52.29°N 02.74°W	SO4967
Comberton	Cambridgeshire	52.18°N 00.01°E	TL3856
Combe St Nicholas	Somerset	50.89°N 02.99°W	ST3011
Combe Throop	Somerset	51.00°N 02.41°W	ST7123
Combpyne	Devon	50.72°N 03.00°W	SY2992
Combrew	Devon	51.06°N 04.11°W	SS5232
Combridge	Staffordshire	52.93°N 01.86°W	SK0937
Combrook	Warwickshire	52.15°N 01.56°W	SP3051
Combs	Suffolk	52.16°N 00.98°E	TM0456
Combs	Kirklees	53.66°N 01.63°W	SE2419
Combs	Derbyshire	53.29°N 01.94°W	SK0478
Combs Ford	Suffolk	52.17°N 00.99°E	TM0557
Combwich	Somerset	51.17°N 03.07°W	ST2542
Comers	Aberdeenshire	57.15°N 02.54°W	NJ6707
Come-to-Good	Cornwall	50.21°N 05.07°W	SW8140
Comeytrowe	Somerset	51.00°N 03.14°W	ST2023
Comford	Cornwall	50.20°N 05.18°W	SW7339
Comfort	Cornwall	50.11°N 05.17°W	SW7329
Comhampton	Worcestershire	52.29°N 02.25°W	SO8366
Comins Coch	Ceredigion	52.41°N 04.04°W	SN6182
Comiston	City of Edinburgh	55.89°N 03.21°W	NT2468
Comley	Shropshire	52.55°N 02.76°W	SO4896
Commercial End	Cambridgeshire	52.24°N 00.26°E	TL5563
Commins	Denbighshire	53.14°N 03.31°W	SJ1262
Commins Coch	Powys	52.61°N 03.71°W	SH8403
Common Cefn-llwyn	Monmouthshire	51.64°N 02.96°W	ST3394
Commondale	North Yorkshire	54.48°N 00.98°W	NZ6610
Common Edge	Lancashire	53.78°N 03.03°W	SD3232
Common End	Cumbria	54.58°N 03.54°W	NY0022
Common End	Derbyshire	53.17°N 01.35°W	SK4364
Common Hill	Herefordshire	52.00°N 02.61°W	SO5834
Common Moor	Cornwall	50.49°N 04.48°W	SX2469
Common Platt	Wiltshire	51.57°N 01.85°W	SU1086
Commonside	Cheshire	53.25°N 02.69°W	SJ5473
Commonside	Derbyshire	52.97°N 01.64°W	SK2442
Commonside	Nottinghamshire	53.11°N 01.31°W	SK4658
Common Side	Cheshire	53.19°N 02.63°W	SJ5867
Common Side (Heanor)	Derbyshire	53.00°N 01.36°W	SK4346
Common Side (Barlow)	Derbyshire	53.27°N 01.50°W	SK3375
Commonwood	Hertfordshire	51.68°N 00.49°W	TL0400
Commonwood	Wrexham	53.07°N 02.92°W	SJ3853
Commonwood	Shropshire	52.84°N 02.77°W	SJ4828
Common-y-coed	Monmouthshire	51.59°N 02.82°W	ST4389
Comp	Kent	51.28°N 00.33°E	TQ6356
Compass	Somerset	51.09°N 03.01°W	ST2933
Compstall	Stockport	53.40°N 02.06°W	SJ9690
Compton	Berkshire	51.51°N 01.25°W	SU5280
Compton	Derbyshire	53.01°N 01.73°W	SK1846
Compton (Plymouth)	Devon	50.38°N 04.12°W	SX4956
Compton (Marldon)	Devon	50.46°N 03.60°W	SX8664
Compton (near Winchester)	Hampshire	51.02°N 01.34°W	SU4625
Compton (King's Somborne)	Hampshire	51.05°N 01.51°W	SU3429
Compton	Leeds	53.89°N 01.40°W	SE3944
Compton	Staffordshire	52.45°N 02.26°W	SO8284
Compton (Guildford)	Surrey	51.20°N 00.64°W	SU9546
Compton (Waverley, near Farnham)	Surrey	51.20°N 00.78°W	SU8546
Compton	West Sussex	50.92°N 00.90°W	SU7714
Compton	Wiltshire	51.26°N 01.81°W	SU1352
Compton	Wolverhampton	52.58°N 02.17°W	SO8898
Compton Abbas	Dorset	50.96°N 02.18°W	ST8718
Compton Abdale	Gloucestershire	51.84°N 01.91°W	SP0616
Compton Bassett	Wiltshire	51.44°N 01.95°W	SU0372
Compton Beauchamp	Oxfordshire	51.58°N 01.59°W	SU2887
Compton Bishop	Somerset	51.29°N 02.87°W	ST3955
Compton Chamberlayne	Wiltshire	51.06°N 01.97°W	SU0229
Compton Common	Bath and North East Somerset	51.36°N 02.51°W	ST6463
Compton Dando	Bath and North East Somerset	51.37°N 02.51°W	ST6464
Compton Dundon	Somerset	51.09°N 02.72°W	ST4933
Compton Durville	Somerset	50.94°N 02.84°W	ST4117
Compton End	Hampshire	51.02°N 01.34°W	SU4625
Compton Green	Gloucestershire	51.95°N 02.39°W	SO7328
Compton Greenfield	South Gloucestershire	51.52°N 02.63°W	ST5681
Compton Martin	Bath and North East Somerset	51.31°N 02.66°W	ST5457
Compton Pauncefoot	Somerset	51.03°N 02.51°W	ST6426
Compton Valence	Dorset	50.73°N 02.58°W	SY5993
Comrie	Perth and Kinross	56.37°N 03.99°W	NN7722
Comrie	Fife	56.08°N 03.57°W	NT0289

=== Con ===
Location	Locality	Coordinates (links to map & photo sources)	OS grid reference
Conanby	Rotherham	53.47°N 01.26°W	SK4998
Conchra	Argyll and Bute	56.04°N 05.18°W	NS0288
Concord	Sunderland	54.90°N 01.53°W	NZ3057
Conder Green	Lancashire	53.98°N 02.82°W	SD4655
Conderton	Worcestershire	52.03°N 02.05°W	SO9637
Condicote	Gloucestershire	51.95°N 01.78°W	SP1528
Condorrat	North Lanarkshire	55.93°N 04.03°W	NS7373
Condover	Shropshire	52.64°N 02.75°W	SJ4906
Coneygar	Dorset	50.73°N 02.76°W	SY4693
Coney Hall	Bromley	51.35°N -00.00°E	TQ3964
Coney Hill	Gloucestershire	51.85°N 02.21°W	SO8517
Coneyhurst	West Sussex	50.99°N 00.43°W	TQ1023
Coneysthorpe	North Yorkshire	54.13°N 00.91°W	SE7171
Coneythorpe	North Yorkshire	54.01°N 01.40°W	SE3958
Coney Weston	Suffolk	52.36°N 00.86°E	TL9578
Conford	Hampshire	51.08°N 00.83°W	SU8232
Congdon's Shop	Cornwall	50.57°N 04.44°W	SX2778
Congelow	Kent	51.21°N 00.41°E	TQ6949
Congerstone	Leicestershire	52.64°N 01.46°W	SK3605
Congham	Norfolk	52.77°N 00.53°E	TF7123
Congleton	Cheshire	53.16°N 02.21°W	SJ8663
Congleton Edge	Cheshire	53.13°N 02.19°W	SJ8760
Congl-y-wal	Gwynedd	52.97°N 03.93°W	SH7044
Congresbury	North Somerset	51.36°N 02.82°W	ST4363
Congreve	Staffordshire	52.71°N 02.14°W	SJ9013
Conham	South Gloucestershire	51.44°N 02.53°W	ST6372
Conicavel	Moray	57.55°N 03.68°W	NH9953
Coningsby	Lincolnshire	53.10°N 00.17°W	TF2258
Conington (South Cambridgeshire)	Cambridgeshire	52.27°N 00.06°W	TL3266
Conington (Huntingdonshire)	Cambridgeshire	52.45°N 00.27°W	TL1785
Conisbrough	Doncaster	53.47°N 01.23°W	SK5198
Conisby	Argyll and Bute	55.76°N 06.37°W	NR2661
Conisholme	Lincolnshire	53.43°N 00.10°E	TF4095
Coniston	East Riding of Yorkshire	53.79°N 00.25°W	TA1535
Coniston	Cumbria	54.36°N 03.07°W	SD3097
Coniston Cold	North Yorkshire	53.99°N 02.15°W	SD9055
Conistone	North Yorkshire	54.09°N 02.03°W	SD9867
Conkwell	Wiltshire	51.35°N 02.30°W	ST7962
Connah's Quay	Flintshire	53.21°N 03.06°W	SJ2969
Connel	Argyll and Bute	56.45°N 05.39°W	NM9134
Connel Park	East Ayrshire	55.38°N 04.21°W	NS6012
Conniburrow	Milton Keynes	52.04°N 00.76°W	SP8539
Connista / Conasta	Highland	57.67°N 06.32°W	NG4273
Connon	Cornwall	50.42°N 04.55°W	SX1962
Connor Downs	Cornwall	50.20°N 05.37°W	SW5939
Conock	Wiltshire	51.31°N 01.91°W	SU0657
Conon Bridge	Highland	57.56°N 04.44°W	NH5455
Cononish	Stirling	56.41°N 04.75°W	NN302284
Cononley	North Yorkshire	53.91°N 02.03°W	SD9847
Cononley Woodside	North Yorkshire	53.91°N 02.03°W	SD9847
Cononsyth	Angus	56.60°N 02.71°W	NO5646
Conordan	Highland	57.36°N 06.15°W	NG5038
Conquermoor Heath	Shropshire	52.76°N 02.49°W	SJ6719
Consall	Staffordshire	53.02°N 02.03°W	SJ9848
Consett	Durham	54.85°N 01.86°W	NZ0951
Constable Burton	North Yorkshire	54.30°N 01.75°W	SE1690
Constable Lee	Lancashire	53.70°N 02.28°W	SD8123
Constantine	Cornwall	50.11°N 05.17°W	SW7329
Constantine Bay	Cornwall	50.52°N 05.02°W	SW8674
Contin	Highland	57.55°N 04.59°W	NH4555
Conwy	Conwy County Borough	53.27°N 03.84°W	SH7777
Conyer	Kent	51.34°N 00.81°E	TQ9664
Conyer's Green	Suffolk	52.26°N 00.75°E	TL8867

=== Coo ===
Location	Locality	Coordinates (links to map & photo sources)	OS grid reference
Cooden	East Sussex	50.83°N 00.42°E	TQ7107
Cookbury	Devon	50.83°N 04.27°W	SS4006
Cookbury Wick	Devon	50.82°N 04.30°W	SS3805
Cookham	Berkshire	51.55°N 00.71°W	SU8985
Cookham Dean	Berkshire	51.54°N 00.76°W	SU8684
Cookham Rise	Berkshire	51.54°N 00.73°W	SU8884
Cookhill	Worcestershire	52.22°N 01.92°W	SP0558
Cooklaw	Northumberland	55.03°N 02.11°W	NY9371
Cookley	Worcestershire	52.41°N 02.23°W	SO8480
Cookley Green	Oxfordshire	51.60°N 01.00°W	SU6990
Cookney	Aberdeenshire	57.02°N 02.21°W	NO8793
Cookridge	Leeds	53.85°N 01.62°W	SE2540
Cooksbridge	East Sussex	50.89°N 00.01°W	TQ4013
Cooksey Corner	Worcestershire	52.31°N 02.13°W	SO9168
Cooksey Green	Worcestershire	52.31°N 02.14°W	SO9069
Cook's Green	Suffolk	52.14°N 00.87°E	TL9753
Cook's Green	Essex	51.81°N 01.16°E	TM1818
Cookshill	City of Stoke-on-Trent	52.98°N 02.09°W	SJ9443
Cooksland	Cornwall	50.47°N 04.70°W	SX0867
Cooksmill Green	Essex	51.72°N 00.35°E	TL6306
Cooksongreen	Cheshire	53.26°N 02.64°W	SJ5774
Coolham	West Sussex	50.98°N 00.40°W	TQ1222
Coolhurst Wood	West Sussex	51.04°N 00.28°W	TQ2029
Cooling	Kent	51.45°N 00.51°E	TQ7576
Coolinge	Kent	51.08°N 01.13°E	TR2036
Cooling Street	Kent	51.43°N 00.50°E	TQ7474
Coombe	Buckinghamshire	51.74°N 00.78°W	SP8406
Coombe (Bude)	Cornwall	50.87°N 04.55°W	SS2011
Coombe (Camborne)	Cornwall	50.23°N 05.33°W	SW6242
Coombe (Liskeard)	Cornwall	50.44°N 04.49°W	SX2363
Coombe (St Austell)	Cornwall	50.32°N 04.88°W	SW9551
Coombe (Truro)	Cornwall	50.22°N 05.04°W	SW8340
Coombe (Sidmouth)	Devon	50.71°N 03.27°W	SY1091
Coombe (Teignmouth)	Devon	50.55°N 03.51°W	SX9374
Coombe (Tiverton)	Devon	50.94°N 03.42°W	ST0017
Coombe	Gloucestershire	51.64°N 02.34°W	ST7694
Coombe	Hampshire	50.97°N 01.06°W	SU6620
Coombe	Kent	51.26°N 01.28°E	TR2957
Coombe	Kingston upon Thames	51.41°N 00.27°W	TQ2070
Coombe (Crewkerne)	Somerset	50.87°N 02.85°W	ST4009
Coombe (Taunton)	Somerset	51.05°N 03.04°W	ST2729
Coombe	Wiltshire	51.24°N 01.80°W	SU1450
Coombe Bissett	Wiltshire	51.03°N 01.85°W	SU1026
Coombe Dingle	City of Bristol	51.49°N 02.64°W	ST5577
Coombe Keynes	Dorset	50.65°N 02.22°W	SY8484
Coombelake	Devon	50.75°N 03.30°W	SY0896
Coombes	West Sussex	50.85°N 00.31°W	TQ1908
Coombesdale	Staffordshire	52.93°N 02.29°W	SJ8038
Coombeswood	Dudley	52.46°N 02.04°W	SO9785
Coomb Hill	Kent	51.35°N 00.38°E	TQ6664
Coomb Islands (Neave)	Highland	58.54°N 04.29°W	NC663643
Coombs End	South Gloucestershire	51.51°N 02.36°W	ST7580
Coombses	Somerset	50.84°N 02.95°W	ST3305
Coopersale	Essex	51.69°N 00.12°E	TL4702
Coopersale Street	Essex	51.68°N 00.12°E	TL4701
Cooper's Corner	Kent	51.22°N 00.11°E	TQ4849
Cooper's Green	East Sussex	50.98°N 00.09°E	TQ4723
Cooper's Green	Hertfordshire	51.76°N 00.27°W	TL1909
Cooper's Hill	Bedfordshire	52.02°N 00.51°W	TL0237
Cooper's Hill	Surrey	51.43°N 00.57°W	SU9972
Cooper Street	Kent	51.28°N 01.29°E	TR3059
Cooper Turning	Bolton	53.56°N 02.56°W	SD6308
Cootham	West Sussex	50.91°N 00.47°W	TQ0714

=== Cop ===
Location	Locality	Coordinates (links to map & photo sources)	OS grid reference
Copcut	Worcestershire	52.24°N 02.17°W	SO8861
Copdock	Suffolk	52.02°N 01.07°E	TM1141
Coped Hall	Wiltshire	51.54°N 01.90°W	SU0783
Copenhagen	Denbighshire	53.18°N 03.43°W	SJ0466
Copford	Essex	51.87°N 00.78°E	TL9223
Copford Green	Essex	51.86°N 00.78°E	TL9222
Copgrove	North Yorkshire	54.06°N 01.48°W	SE3463
Copinsay	Orkney Islands	58.89°N 02.68°W	HY607012
Copister	Shetland Islands	60.48°N 01.14°W	HU4778
Coplandhill	Aberdeenshire	57.50°N 01.81°W	NK1146
Cople	Bedfordshire	52.11°N 00.39°W	TL1048
Copley	Durham	54.62°N 01.87°W	NZ0825
Copley	Calderdale	53.69°N 01.88°W	SE0822
Copley	Tameside	53.47°N 02.04°W	SJ9798
Copley Hill	Kirklees	53.73°N 01.65°W	SE2326
Coplow Dale	Derbyshire	53.30°N 01.76°W	SK1679
Copmanthorpe	York	53.91°N 01.14°W	SE5647
Copmere End	Staffordshire	52.85°N 02.29°W	SJ8029
Copnor	City of Portsmouth	50.81°N 01.06°W	SU6602
Copp	Lancashire	53.84°N 02.88°W	SD4239
Coppathorne	Cornwall	50.77°N 04.54°W	SS2100
Coppenhall	Cheshire	53.10°N 02.44°W	SJ7056
Coppenhall	Staffordshire	52.76°N 02.14°W	SJ9019
Coppenhall Moss	Cheshire	53.11°N 02.44°W	SJ7058
Copperhouse	Cornwall	50.18°N 05.40°W	SW5737
Coppice	Oldham	53.52°N 02.12°W	SD9203
Coppicegate	Shropshire	52.41°N 02.39°W	SO7380
Coppingford	Cambridgeshire	52.40°N 00.29°W	TL1680
Coppins Corner	Kent	51.19°N 00.77°E	TQ9448
Coppleham	Somerset	51.09°N 03.54°W	SS9234
Copplestone	Devon	50.80°N 03.76°W	SS7602
Coppull	Lancashire	53.62°N 02.66°W	SD5614
Coppull Moor	Wigan	53.60°N 02.68°W	SD5512
Copsale	West Sussex	51.00°N 00.33°W	TQ1724
Copse Hill	Merton	51.41°N 00.24°W	TQ2270
Copshaw Holm or Newcastleton	Scottish Borders	55.17°N 02.81°W	NY4887
Copster Green	Lancashire	53.79°N 02.50°W	SD6733
Copster Hill	Oldham	53.52°N 02.12°W	SD9203
Copston Magna	Warwickshire	52.48°N 01.33°W	SP4588
Cop Street	Kent	51.28°N 01.28°E	TR2959
Copt Green	Warwickshire	52.31°N 01.75°W	SP1769
Copthall Green	Essex	51.69°N 00.05°E	TL4201
Copt Heath	Solihull	52.39°N 01.75°W	SP1777
Copt Hewick	North Yorkshire	54.13°N 01.49°W	SE3371
Copthill	Durham	54.75°N 02.23°W	NY8540
Copthorne	West Sussex	51.13°N 00.12°W	TQ3139
Copthorne	Cornwall	50.70°N 04.46°W	SX2692
Copthorne	Cheshire	52.98°N 02.52°W	SJ6543
Copthorne	Shropshire	52.70°N 02.78°W	SJ4712
Coptiviney	Shropshire	52.92°N 02.87°W	SJ4137
Copt Oak	Leicestershire	52.70°N 01.29°W	SK4812
Copton	Kent	51.29°N 00.88°E	TR0159
Copy's Green	Norfolk	52.91°N 00.88°E	TF9439
Copythorne	Hampshire	50.92°N 01.57°W	SU3014

=== Coq ===
Location	Locality	Coordinates (links to map & photo sources)	OS grid reference
Coquet Island	Northumberland	55.33°N 01.54°W	NU291048

=== Cor ===
Location	Locality	Coordinates (links to map & photo sources)	OS grid reference
Corarnstilbeg	Highland	57.06°N 03.93°W	NN8399
Corbets Tey	Havering	51.54°N 00.23°E	TQ5585
Corbridge	Northumberland	54.97°N 02.01°W	NY9964
Corbriggs	Derbyshire	53.20°N 01.38°W	SK4168
Corby	Northamptonshire	52.49°N 00.70°W	SP8889
Corby Glen	Lincolnshire	52.81°N 00.53°W	SK9925
Corby Hill	Cumbria	54.90°N 02.81°W	NY4857
Cordon	North Ayrshire	55.52°N 05.13°W	NS0230
Cordwell	Norfolk	52.49°N 01.13°E	TM1393
Coreley	Shropshire	52.35°N 02.57°W	SO6173
Cores End	Buckinghamshire	51.57°N 00.70°W	SU9087
Corfe	Somerset	50.96°N 03.09°W	ST2319
Corfe Castle	Dorset	50.62°N 02.05°W	SY9681
Corfe Mullen	Dorset	50.77°N 02.02°W	SY9897
Corfhouse	Argyll and Bute	56.43°N 05.22°W	NN0132
Corfton	Shropshire	52.45°N 02.75°W	SO4984
Corfton Bache	Shropshire	52.46°N 02.75°W	SO4985
Corgarff	Aberdeenshire	57.15°N 03.20°W	NJ2708
Corgee	Cornwall	50.40°N 04.76°W	SX0460
Corhampton	Hampshire	50.97°N 01.13°W	SU6120
Corlannau	Neath Port Talbot	51.59°N 03.79°W	SS7690
Corley	Warwickshire	52.46°N 01.55°W	SP3085
Corley Ash	Warwickshire	52.47°N 01.57°W	SP2986
Corley Moor	Coventry	52.45°N 01.58°W	SP2884
Cornaa	Isle of Man	54.27°N 04.41°W	SC4389
Cornaigbeg	Argyll and Bute	56.50°N 06.91°W	NL9846
Cornaigmore	Argyll and Bute	56.51°N 06.91°W	NL9847
Cornard Tye	Suffolk	52.03°N 00.76°E	TL9041
Cornbank	Midlothian	55.82°N 03.24°W	NT2260
Cornbrook	Shropshire	52.37°N 02.58°W	SO6075
Corner Row	Lancashire	53.79°N 02.89°W	SD4134
Cornett	Herefordshire	52.13°N 02.62°W	SO5749
Corney	Cumbria	54.30°N 03.36°W	SD1191
Cornforth	Durham	54.70°N 01.52°W	NZ3134
Cornhill	Powys	52.05°N 03.25°W	SO1440
Cornhill	Aberdeenshire	57.61°N 02.70°W	NJ5858
Cornhill	Highland	57.88°N 04.39°W	NH5891
Cornhill	City of Stoke-on-Trent	53.06°N 02.16°W	SJ8952
Cornhill	City of Aberdeen	57.15°N 02.15°W	NJ9107
Cornhill-on-Tweed	Northumberland	55.64°N 02.22°W	NT8639
Corn Holm	Orkney Islands	58.89°N 02.70°W	HY595010
Cornholme	Calderdale	53.73°N 02.15°W	SD9026
Cornish Hall End	Essex	51.99°N 00.44°E	TL6836
Cornriggs	Durham	54.76°N 02.25°W	NY8441
Cornsay	Durham	54.78°N 01.78°W	NZ1443
Cornsay Colliery	Durham	54.78°N 01.75°W	NZ1643
Cornton	Stirling	56.13°N 03.94°W	NS7995
Corntown	Highland	57.57°N 04.42°W	NH5556
Corntown	The Vale of Glamorgan	51.48°N 03.57°W	SS9177
Cornwell	Oxfordshire	51.94°N 01.60°W	SP2727
Cornwood	Devon	50.41°N 03.97°W	SX6059
Cornworthy	Devon	50.38°N 03.66°W	SX8255
Corpach	Highland	56.83°N 05.13°W	NN0976
Corpusty	Norfolk	52.82°N 01.13°E	TG1130
Corran (Loch Hourn)	Highland	57.12°N 05.55°W	NG8509
Corran (Lochaber)	Highland	56.71°N 05.25°W	NN0163
Corrany	Isle of Man	54.27°N 04.38°W	SC4589
Corrie	North Ayrshire	55.64°N 05.14°W	NS0243
Corrie Common	Dumfries and Galloway	55.16°N 03.25°W	NY2086
Corriecravie	North Ayrshire	55.45°N 05.29°W	NR9223
Corriedoo	Dumfries and Galloway	55.11°N 04.07°W	NX6882
Corrigall	Orkney Islands	59.05°N 03.18°W	HY3219
Corrimony	Highland	57.33°N 04.70°W	NH3730
Corringham	Essex	51.52°N 00.44°E	TQ7083
Corringham	Lincolnshire	53.40°N 00.69°W	SK8791
Corris	Gwynedd	52.64°N 03.84°W	SH7507
Corris Uchaf	Gwynedd	52.65°N 03.86°W	SH7408
Corry	Highland	57.24°N 05.91°W	NG6424
Corsback	Highland	58.62°N 03.32°W	ND2372
Corscombe	Dorset	50.84°N 02.69°W	ST5105
Corse	Gloucestershire	51.93°N 02.32°W	SO7826
Corse	Aberdeenshire	57.44°N 02.66°W	NJ6040
Corse Lawn	Gloucestershire	51.96°N 02.24°W	SO8330
Corsham	Wiltshire	51.42°N 02.20°W	ST8670
Corsiehill	Perth and Kinross	56.39°N 03.41°W	NO1323
Corsley	Wiltshire	51.21°N 02.25°W	ST8246
Corsley Heath	Wiltshire	51.20°N 02.25°W	ST8245
Corsock	Dumfries and Galloway	55.06°N 03.95°W	NX7576
Corston	Wiltshire	51.55°N 02.11°W	ST9284
Corston	Bath and North East Somerset	51.38°N 02.44°W	ST6965
Corstorphine	City of Edinburgh	55.93°N 03.29°W	NT1972
Cortachy	Angus	56.71°N 02.99°W	NO3959
Corton	Wiltshire	51.15°N 02.10°W	ST9340
Corton	Suffolk	52.51°N 01.74°E	TM5497
Corton Denham	Somerset	50.99°N 02.52°W	ST6322
Cortworth	Rotherham	53.47°N 01.39°W	SK4098
Corwen	Denbighshire	52.97°N 03.38°W	SJ0743
Cory	Devon	50.91°N 04.34°W	SS3516
Coryates	Dorset	50.66°N 02.53°W	SY6285
Coryton	Devon	50.62°N 04.19°W	SX4583
Coryton	Cardiff	51.52°N 03.24°W	ST1481
