= Campton =

Campton may refer to:

== People ==
- Aimée Campton (1882–1930), Anglo-French actress
- David Campton (1924–2006), British dramatist

== Places ==
=== In the United Kingdom ===
- Campton and Chicksands, Bedfordshire, England, a civil parish
  - Campton, Bedfordshire, England, a village located in the civil parish

=== In the United States ===
- Campton, Georgia, an unincorporated community
- Campton, Kentucky, a city
- Campton, New Hampshire, a town
- Campton, South Carolina, an unincorporated community
- Campton Hills, Illinois, a village

== See also ==
- Camptown (disambiguation)
- Compton (disambiguation)
