= Common End =

Common End may refer to the following places in England:

- Common End, Colkirk, Norfolk
- Common End, Cumbria
- Common End, Derbyshire
