= NGC 6264 =

Galaxy in the constellation Hercules

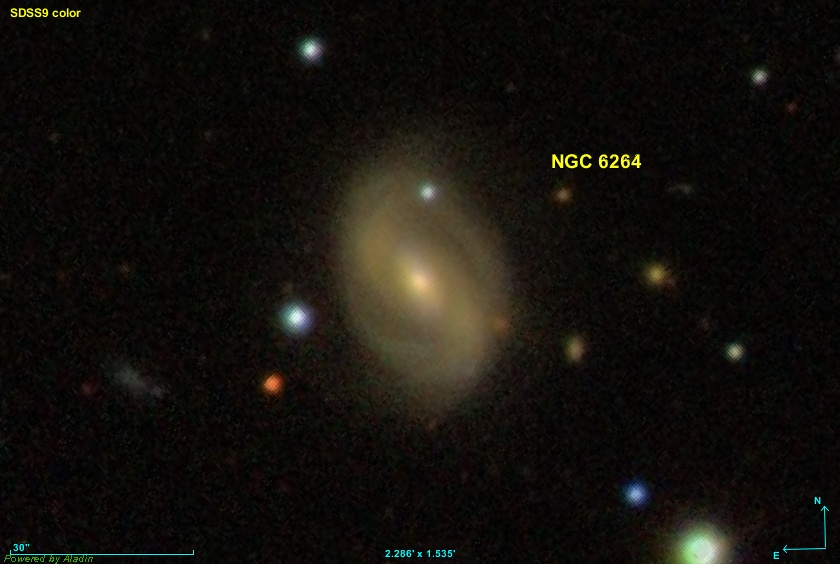
- SDSS image of NGC 6264

Observation data (J2000 epoch)
- Constellation: Hercules
- Right ascension: 16^{h} 57^{m} 16.12^{s}
- Declination: +27° 50′ 58.56″
- Redshift: 0.033840
- Heliocentric radial velocity: 10,145 ± 2 km/s
- Distance: 495.3 ± 34.7 Mly (151.85 ± 10.63 Mpc)
- Apparent magnitude (V): 14.7

Characteristics
- Type: Sb Sy2
- Size: ~154,000 ly (47.3 kpc) (estimated)

Other designations
- CGCG 169-015, MCG +05-40-009, IRAS-L 16552+2755, PGC 59306, UCM 1655+2755, WBL 625-001

NGC 6264 is an active Seyfert galaxy located in the constellation of Hercules. The redshift of the galaxy is (z) 0.033 and it was first discovered in June 1864 by the German astronomer Albert Marth who described it as having a magnitude of 15 and is faint, small and also round. This galaxy is known to host a triple peaked water megamaser.

== Description ==
NGC 6264 is categorized as a barred spiral galaxy of Type Sb or Type Sc+. The nucleus of this galaxy is known to be active and is classified as a Type 2 Seyfert galaxy. The galaxy contains signatures of water maser emission with its own circumnuclear disk warped slightly and also having a thin appearance. The position angle of the disk is -85° and the inclination angle is 90°. The disk's inner and outer radius are 0.18 and 0.77 parsecs respectively. The estimated mass of the Keplerian disk is 0.42 ± 0.03 × 10^{7} M_{☉}.

A study has found the supermassive black hole lying in the center of NGC 6264 has a mass of 3.09 ± 0.42 × 10^{7} M_{☉}. The maser features have different acceleration ranges, with the masers in one of the clump features having velocities higher than at least 7 kilometers per second per year. In another clump, the masers have an acceleration of 3.96 ± 1.77 kilometers per second per year. The total star formation of the galaxy is estimated to be around 1.4 M_{☉} per year. Further evidence also suggests the active galactic nucleus (AGN) is Compton thick. The bolometric luminosity of the AGN is 45.55 erg s^{−1}.
