= St John's Church, Waberthwaite =

Coordinates: 54.3437°N 3.3855°W

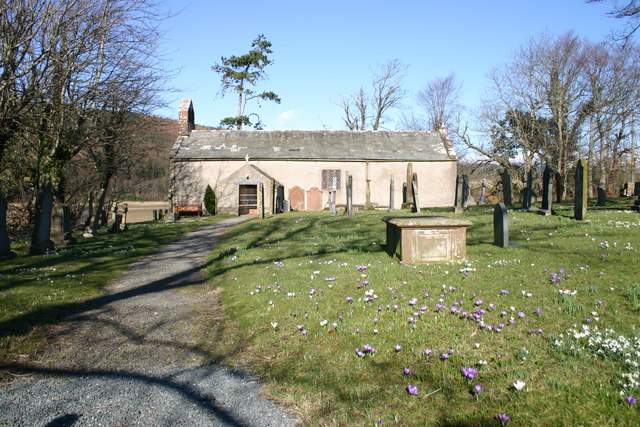
- St John's Church, Waberthwaite, from the south

- Location in Cumbria
- OS grid reference: SD 100 951
- Location: Waberthwaite, Cumbria
- Country: England
- Denomination: Anglican
- Website: St John, Waberthwaite

History
- Status: Parish church

Architecture
- Functional status: Active
- Heritage designation: Grade II*
- Designated: 8 September 1967
- Architectural type: Church

Specifications
- Materials: Roughcast stone, slate roofs

Administration
- Province: York
- Diocese: Carlisle
- Archdeaconry: West Cumberland
- Deanery: Calder
- Parish: Waberthwaite

Clergy
- Priest: Gillian Mary Hart

St John's Church is situated on the south bank of the River Esk in the hamlet of Hall Waberthwaite in the former civil parish of Waberthwaite (now part of the civil parish of Waberthwaite and Corney), Cumbria, England. It is an active Anglican parish church in the deanery of Calder, the archdeaconry of West Cumberland, and the diocese of Carlisle. Its benefice is united with those of St Paul, Irton; St Michael, Muncaster; and St Catherine, Boot. The church is recorded in the National Heritage List for England as a designated Grade II* listed building.

== History ==
St John's probably dates from the 13th century, with later alterations and additions, but the presence of the remains of 9th- and 10th-century crosses in the churchyard indicates that the site was a religious centre for centuries before that.

== Architecture ==
The church is constructed in roughcast stone with slate roofs. Its plan consists of a single cell (i.e. there is no transept and the chancel and nave share the same space with no dividing arches or screens between them). A vestry is attached to the east end of the north wall, and a porch covers the entrance at the west end of the south wall. The porch was rebuilt in 1825.

== Internal features ==
Inside the church is an octagonal wooden pulpit with carved decoration and the inscription: THE GIFT OF ABRAHAM CHAMBERS GENT. VA(E) MIHI SI NON VERUM PRAEDICO ("Woe to me if I preach not the truth"). It is initialled S.R. and dated 1630 (S.R. was possibly Samuel Rutter who appears to have been rector of Waberthwaite in 1630. He subsequently became Bishop of Sodor and Man.)

The font is a lead-lined hollowed-out monolith of sandstone with a square plan and oak lid. On the north wall opposite the door are the royal arms of George III. The interior of the church was fitted with box pews, and flagged and ceiled in 1807. The oil lamps of an earlier age have been retained and artfully converted to electric.

== External features ==
The church has a bellcote on the west gable containing two 15th Century bells which were retained when the bellcote was refurbished in 1796. The south bell (the tenor) has the inscription SANCTUS JACOBUS (Saint James). DOMINUS THOMAS WALKER (Sir Thomas Walker) in Lombardic lettering. Thomas Walker was rector of the church from 1439 till some time after 1473. The north bell (the treble) bears the inscription HENRICUS SEXTUS REX (King Henry the sixth). This is also in Lombardic lettering.

Whether the bells were donated by Henry VI (e.g. in gratitude for the safe haven provided by Sir John Pennington when Henry was fleeing after his forces had suffered a defeat at the hands of the Yorkists in the battle of Hexham in 1464 or the battle of Towton in 1461 (sources vary) – cf "The Luck of Muncaster" at Muncaster Castle), or whether they were merely installed during his reign (1422 to 1471), it is not known, but the lettering gives a possible date range for the bells installation which is consistent with their installation during the rectorship of Thomas Walker.

The naming of St James on the south bell is interesting. Though there may be nothing unusual in church bells bearing the name of a saint to whom the church is not dedicated, it is worthy of note that when the advowson of Waberthwaite church was transferred to Sir Richard de Kirkby in 1392, the church was referred to as St James. If the church was originally dedicated to St James and subsequently re-dedicated to St John, then it would appear that the re-dedication may have taken place after the reign of Henry VI.

== Churchyard ==
In the churchyard are the remains of two Anglo-Scandinavian high cross shafts constructed in sandstone. W. G. Collingwood has dated the two cross shafts. The fallen shaft he has identified as being Anglian in the style of its decoration, and has dated it as no earlier than 850 and no later than 925. The standing shaft shows strong Norse influence in its decoration, and Collingwood has dated it to about 950. Both shafts have rectangular cross-sections, and are decoratively carved on all sides, but the fallen shaft was used as a threshold for the church door for a long time and is badly worn on one face. The standing shaft was found in the churchyard in 1825, and then used as a lintel. It was moved into its present position and reunited with its socle, which was also found in the churchyard, between 1884 and 1889. The standing shaft is a scheduled monument.

The churchyard also contains a 5' 6" high sundial. An inscription states that it was made in 1830 by Watkins and Hill of London for the Reverend J. Stanley and it is calibrated for the latitude of 54 degrees, 13 minutes. The plinth is of sandstone and has a square top on which are mounted a brass gnomon and an inset circular brass plate graduated in hours and 2-minute intervals. The dial also has a scale of months and days. It is registered as dial number 2220 in the register of the British Sundial Society.

== Legacy bell ==
On the internal sill of the west window is a bell that originally belonged to the Chapel of St. Luke which stood at Lane End in Waberthwaite. The bell is dated 1882 and was moved to the church when the chapel was demolished.

== Gallery ==
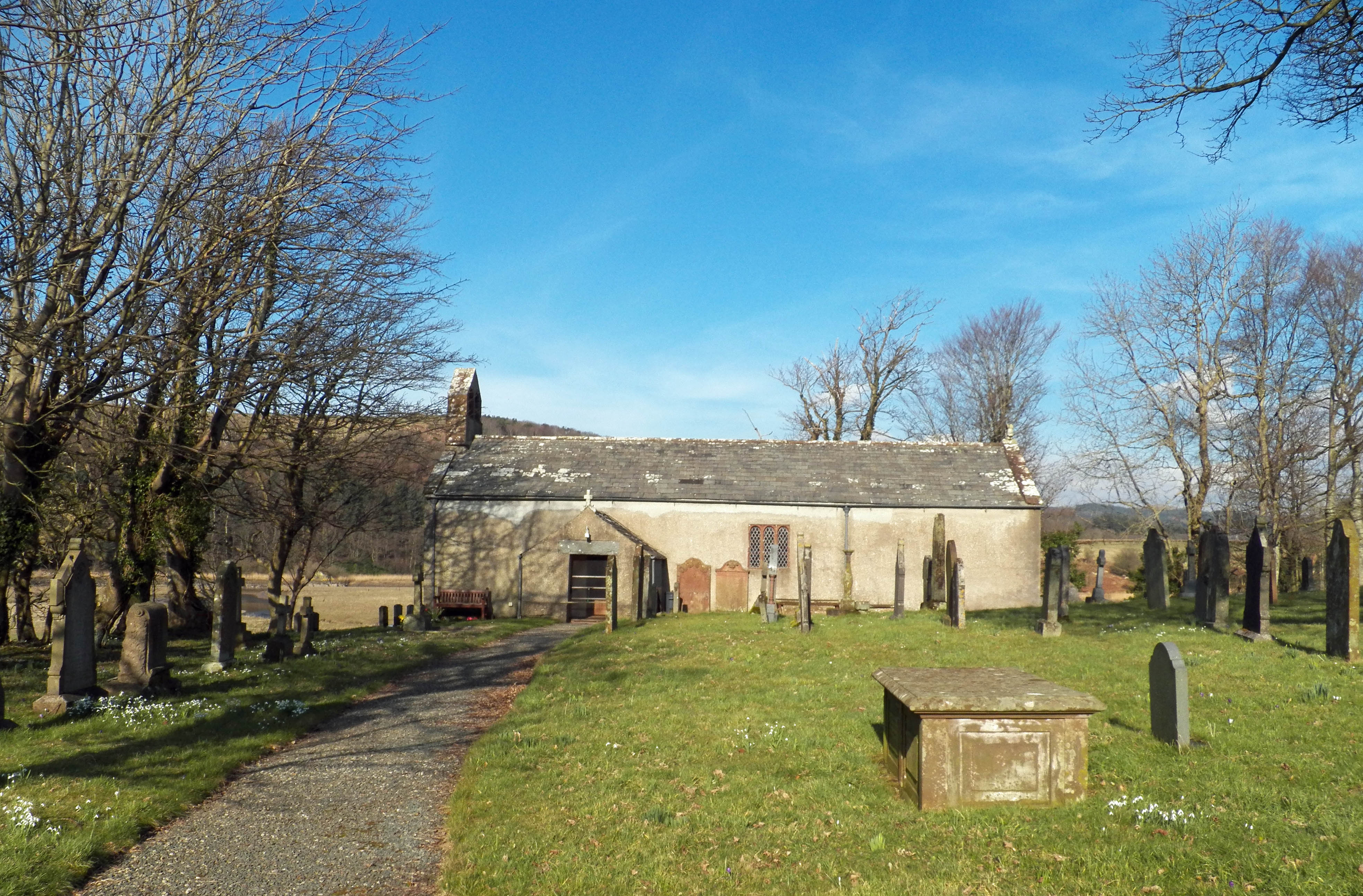
Waberthwaite church

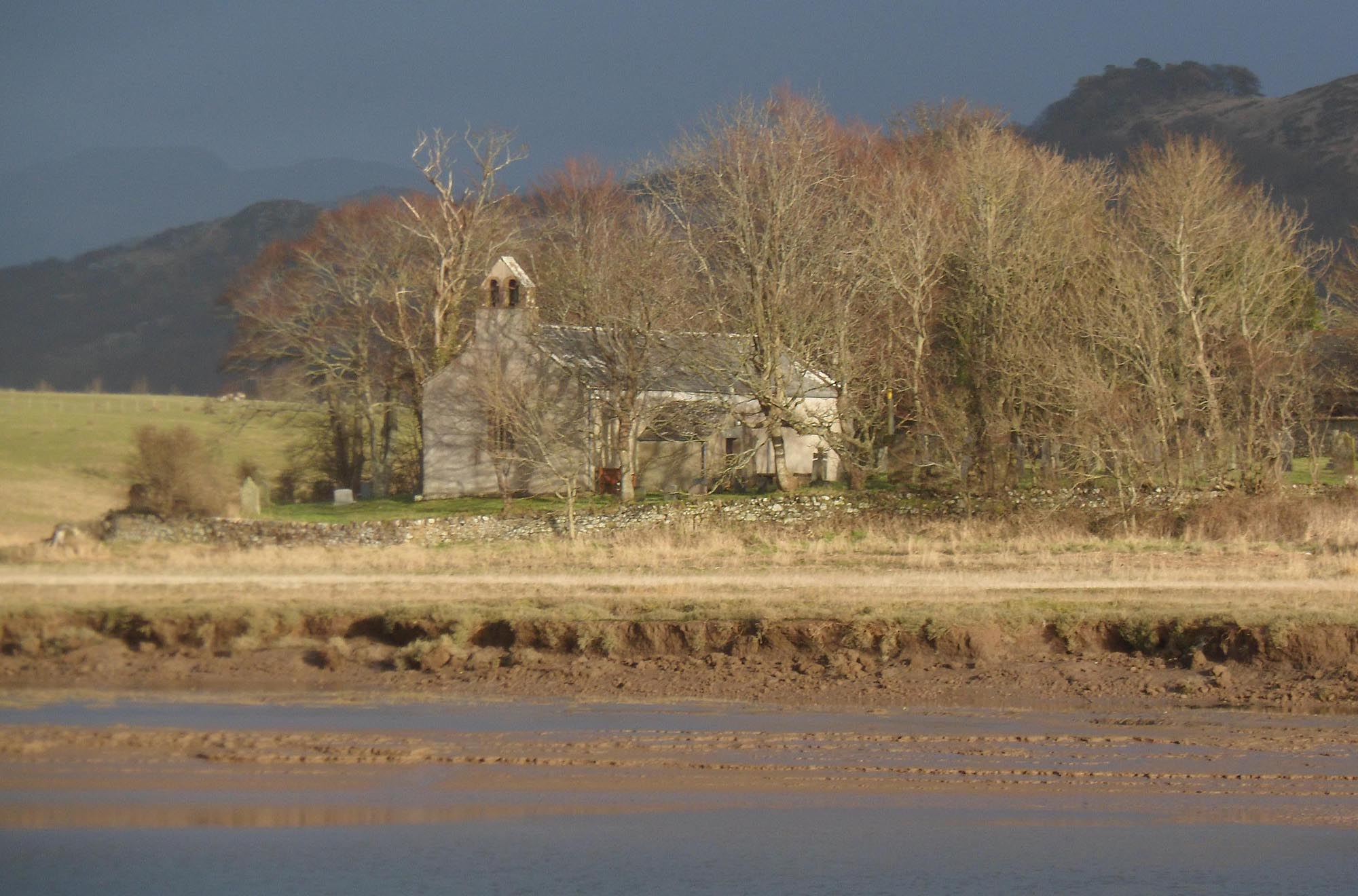
St John's Church, Waberthwaite, from across the Esk

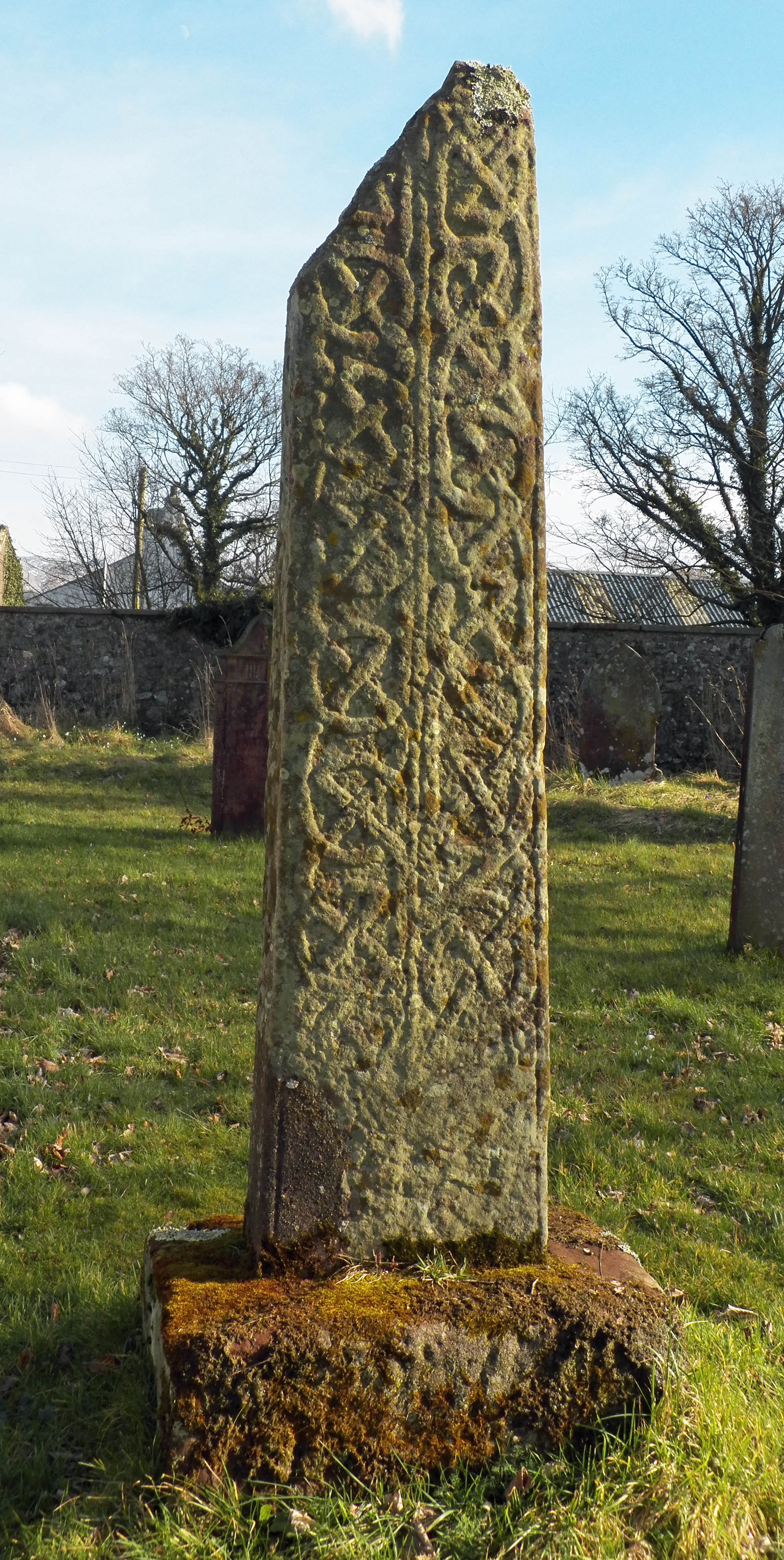
The large cross shaft – 10th century.

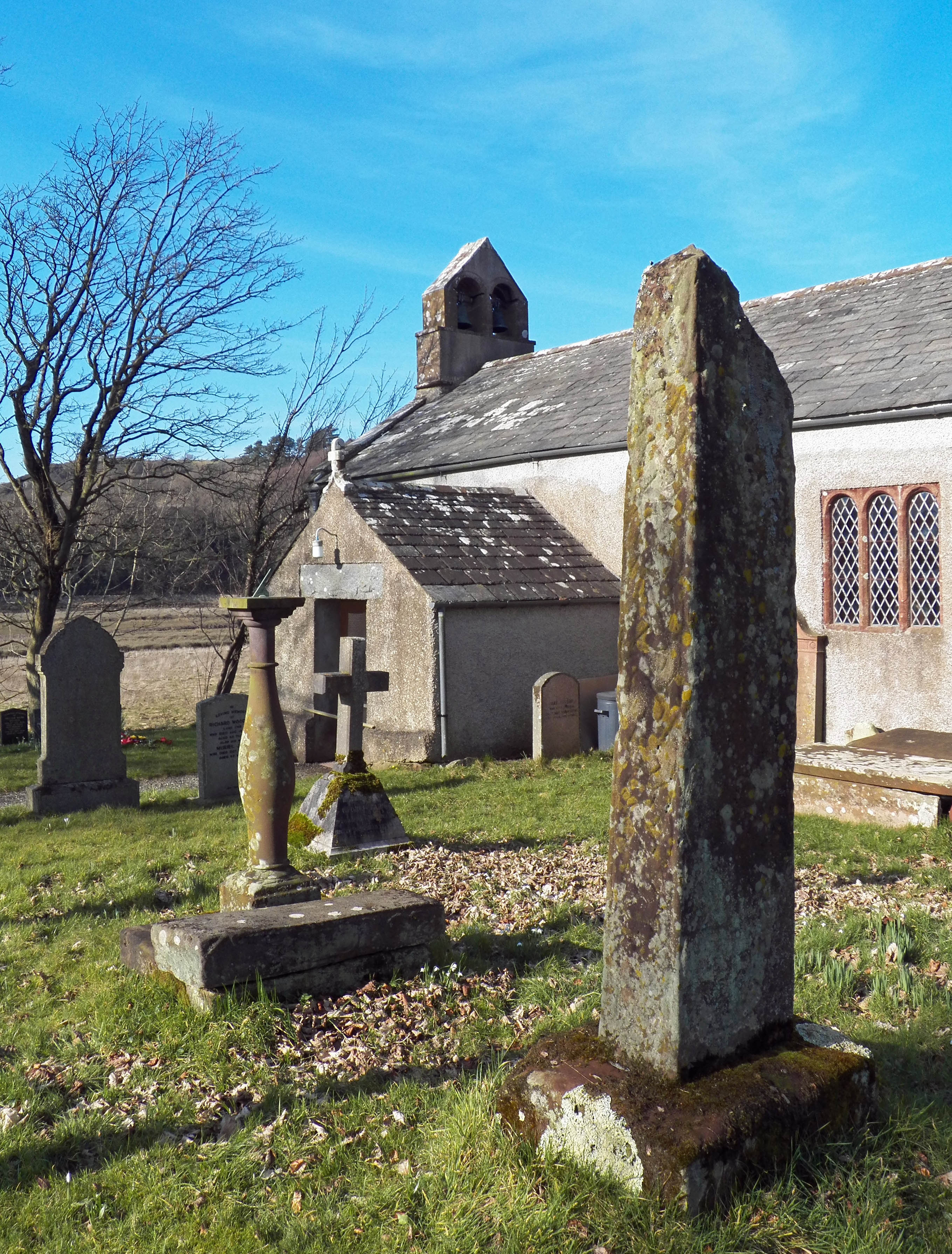
Waberthwaite church showing sundial and cross shaft

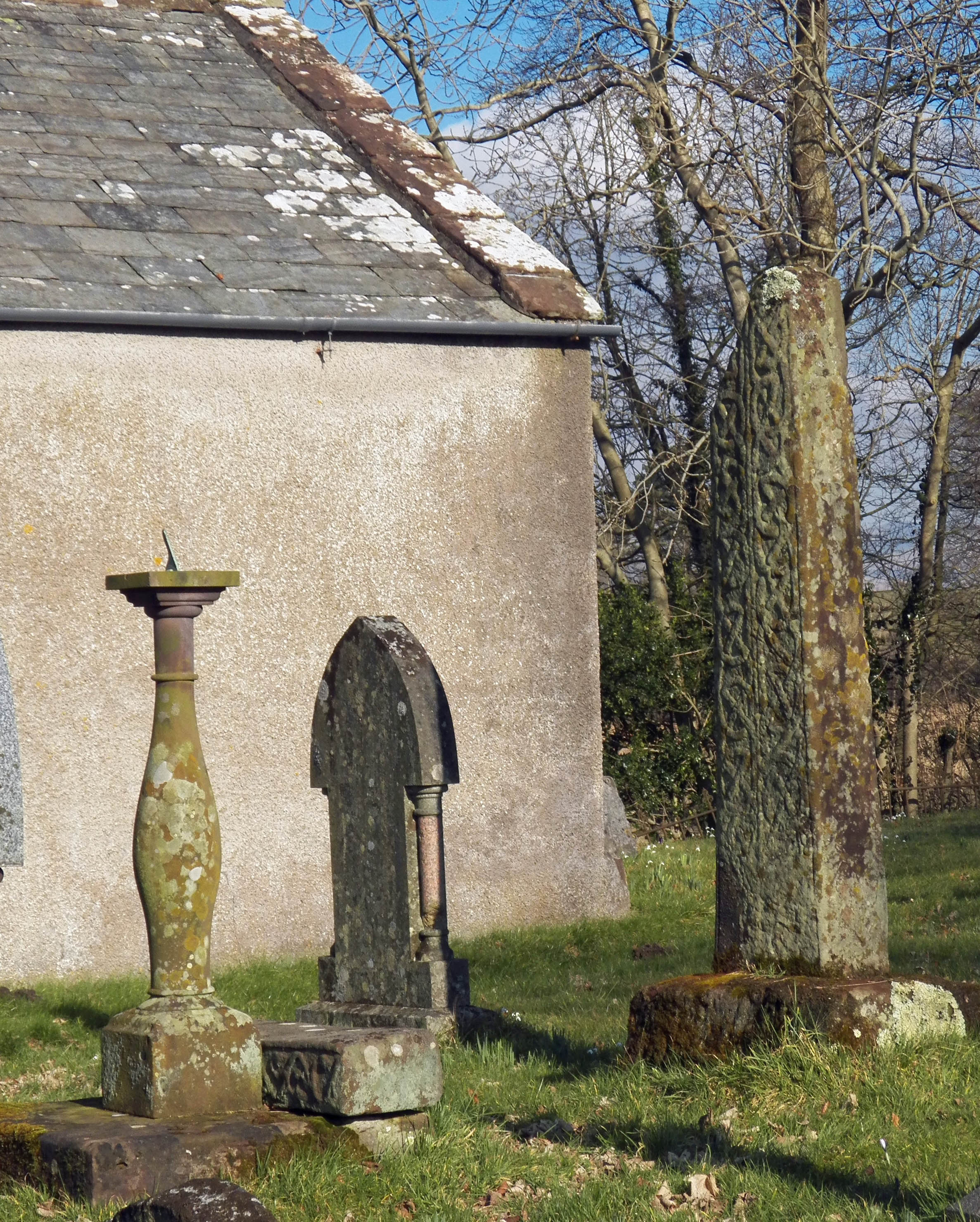
View of sundial and both the standing and fallen cross shafts. The fallen shaft is at the foot of the sundial.

== See also ==
- Grade II* listed buildings in Cumberland
- Listed buildings in Waberthwaite
