= Les Scott (writer and broadcaster) =

Journalist

- Born: 3 August 1952 (age 74); Sunderland, Tyne-Wear, England
- Occupation: Sports Journalist
- Years active: 1980–present
- Spouse: Caroline Burley (m 1992. Divorced 1995)
- Partner(s): Sally Ann-Barr (partner, 1996-2002); Susan Millard (partner, 2014 to present)
- Children: Lauren and Ruby (with Sally-Ann Barr)

Les Scott (born 3 August 1952) is an English writer and broadcaster. He is best known as a football writer and ghost-writer of football autobiographies, many of which have appeared in the Sunday Times Best Sellers List, notably Sir Stanley Matthews' autobiography, The Way It Was. Jimmy Greaves described him as, ‘One of the best football writers of our time’. Reflecting on his autobiography of 2000, Sir Stanley Matthews said, ‘At the risk of sounding immodest, I could have chosen to work with many writers when I chose to commit my life to book form, but chose to work with Les, whose writing I have greatly admired for some years now.’. Scott has also written and performed extensively for radio, television and theatre.

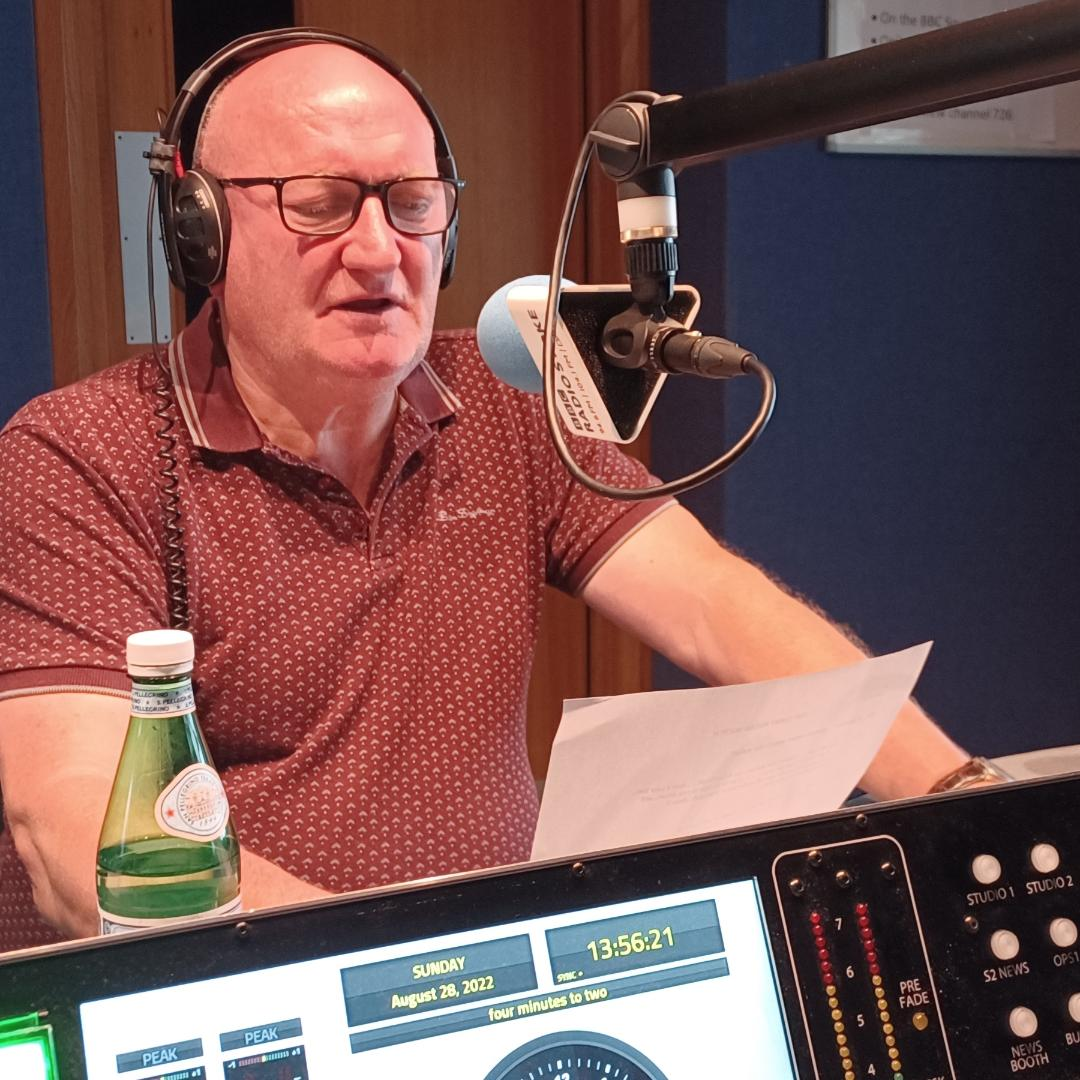
Les Scott presenting 'World of Sport' BBC Radio Stoke 2022

== Early life ==
Scott was born in Sunderland, Tyne-Wear, to David (a dock foreman) and Lucy Scott (a shop assistant). He had one brother, David, nine years older, who died in 2023. Scott attended Bede Grammar School, Sunderland (1963–68) but left without any qualifications. He attended Monkwearmouth College of Further Education, Sunderland (1970–71) where he achieved both GCSE ‘O’ levels and ‘A’ level qualifications in one academic year of study. He attended Keele University/Alsager College (1971–1974) where he graduated as a teacher.

Whilst teaching in Stoke-on- Trent (1974–1980), he began writing musical plays for young people; comedy for BBC radio programmes such as ‘Week Ending’ and ‘The News Huddlines’ and TV programmes such as ‘The Two Ronnies’, ‘Not the Nine O’Clock News’, ‘Fast Forward’ and ‘Razzmatazz (ITV). In 1980, he became a full-time freelance writer.

== Journalism ==
Scott has written extensively about football for both national and regional press. He penned a thrice-weekly sports column for the Evening Sentinel (1998-2012) which was syndicated to several newspapers in the Northcliffe Group. He was the Daily/Sunday Telegraph’s Football League Correspondent, North and Midlands, (2012-2016)

== Radio ==
Scott has appeared extensively on national and local radio. He presented ‘Saturday Sport’ on Signal Radio (1995–96) and BBC Radio Stoke's ‘Daily Drivetime’ and ‘Saturday Sport’ programmes (1997–1999). From 2010 to 2023, he wrote and co-presented, with Den Siegertsz, ‘World Of Sport’ (BBC Radio Stoke), as well as writing some 6,000 jokes and sketches for he and Seigertsz to perform in ‘Seigertsz’ Comedy Slots’ His BBC Radio Four credits include, Off The Page and Escape From Victory, with Ian McMillan, (2006, Producer Ali Serle).

== Theatre ==
Rockafella, with Ken Bolam and Roy Oakes, Samuel French, 1980; United We Stand, with Ken Bolam and Roy Oakes, Samuel French 1983; The Frankenstein Monster Show, with Ken Bolam, John Crocker and Tim Hampton, Samuel French 1984.

Scott has acted as MC/Compere for several touring sporting theatre shows including, Best and Marsh (with George Best and Rodney Marsh), Heroes and Villains (with Gareth Chilcott and Gareth Davies), From The Pavilion (with Freddie Trueman), A Night with Greavsie (with Jimmy Greaves), Dennis Waterman at Large and The Football Nostalgia Show (with Nick Johnson of SkySports, 2023 - current).

== Television ==
Credits include The Two Ronnies, BBC TV, 1976–1982; Not The Nine O’Clock News BBC TV, 1979–1982; Razzmatazz, with Suzanne Dando and Alistair Pirie, ITV, 1981; Fast Forward BBC TV, 1981; Alfresco, Granada TV 1983; Roll With It, with Noddy Holder and Toyah Wilcox, Sky/Challenge, 1996; Football's Golden Greats, Sky/Bravo, 2006; More Football Golden Greats, Sky/Bravo, 2007.

== Bibliography ==
- Best of Times, with George Best. Simon and Schuster, 1994.
- My Favourite Rugby Stories, with Gareth Chilcott. Simon and Schuster, 1995.
- The Way It Was, with Sir Stanley Matthews, Headline 2000
- Banksy, with Gordon Banks, Penguin 2002
- Greavsie, with Jimmy Greaves, Time-Warner, 2003
- Shilton, with Peter Shilton, Orion, 2004
- As It Was, with Freddie Trueman, MacMillan, 2004
- The Heart of the Game, with Jimmy Greaves, Time-Warner, 2005
- The Doc, with Tommy Docherty, Headline, 2006
- Anfield Iron, with Tommy Smith, Bantam, 2008
- End To End Stuff, Bantam, 2008
- Rush, with Ian Rush, Ebury, 2009
- 555 Football Facts to Wow Your Mates (children), Doubleday, 2009
- Bats, Balls and Bails, The Essential Cricket Book, Bantam, 2009
- Between The Sticks, with Alan Hodgkinson, HarperCollins, 2013
- Denied Promotion By A Tree, Aureus, 2023
- A Joyful Noise, with Jermain Defoe, 2025

== Current ==
In addition to football writing, Scott works as a Football Match Analyst for Perform/Opta (since 2018) covering Premier League, PL2 and EFL matches.
