= CMZ =

CMZ may refer to:

== Places ==
- Central Molecular Zone, a region of the Milky Way Galaxy
- Cheyenne Mountain Zoo, a zoological park in Colorado, United States
- Cleveland Metroparks Zoo, a zoo in Cleveland, Ohio, USA
- Coastal military zone, Atlantic Wall, France; during German occupation in WW2
- Crittenden Mount Zion, Grant County, Kentucky, USA; an elementary school
- Caia Airport (IATA airport code CMZ), Caia, Mozambique; see List of airports by IATA airport code: C

== Groups, organizatoins ==
- Compton Petroleum (stock ticker CMZ), a Canadian petroleum exploration company based in Alberta
- Core Magazine (cmz.co.jp), a Japanese magazine publisher
- Collegium Musicum Zürich (1941–1992), Swiss orchestra based in Zurich founded by Paul Sacher
- CMZ (Cohen-Manafort-Zackson), a real estate investment company founded by Brad Zackson, Paul Manafort, Arthur G. Cohen
- Compagnie Mauritanienne des Services (ICAO airline code CMZ), see List of defunct airlines of Mauritania
- Mozambique Company (CMZ; Portuguese: Companhia de Moçambique), a royal colony corporation
- Genossenschaft Migros Zürich (GMZ, CMZ, French: Coopérative Migros Zurich; German: Migros Cooperative Zurich), a member cooperative, the founding member of Migros

=== Fictional ===
- CMZ, a fictional celebrity news organization similar to TMZ, from the U.S. comedy film Popstar: Never Stop Never Stopping

== Other uses ==
- Cape mountain zebra (Equus zebra zebra), a subspecies of zebra, an equine animal
- classified militarized zone, in networked computer security; see DMZ (computing)
- clomethiazole (CMZ, brand name: Zendra), a cerebroprotectant pharmaceutical drug

== See also ==
- Corresponding Member of the Zoological Society of London (CMZS), post-nominal letters for explorers and adventurers
