= Copthorne =

Copthorne may refer to:

== Place names ==
- Copthorne, Cheshire, England
- Copthorne, Cornwall
- Copthorne, Shropshire, England
- Copthorne, West Sussex, England
- Copthorne Hundred in Surrey, England

== Companies ==
- Millennium & Copthorne Hotels, a division of City Developments Limited
