= BBC Radio Stoke =

- Stoke-on-Trent; England
- Broadcast area: North and mid Staffordshire and south Cheshire.
- Frequencies: FM: 94.6 (Crewe, Nantwich, and Stoke-on-Trent); FM: 104.1 (Stafford and Stone); DAB: 12D; Freeview: 715
- RDS: BBCSTOKE

Programming
- Language: English
- Format: Local news, talk and music

Ownership
- Owner: BBC Local Radio, BBC West Midlands, BBC North West

History
- First air date: 14 March 1968
- Former names: BBC Radio Stoke-on-Trent
- Former frequencies: 1503 MW

Technical information
- Licensing authority: Ofcom

Links
- Website: BBC Radio Stoke

BBC Radio Stoke is the BBC's local radio station serving Staffordshire and South Cheshire.

It broadcasts on FM, DAB, Freeview and via BBC Sounds from studios in the Hanley area of Stoke-on-Trent.

According to RAJAR, the station has a weekly audience of 118,000 listeners and an 8.9% share as of December 2023.

== Overview ==
The station began broadcasting on 14 March 1968 as BBC Radio Stoke-on-Trent.

Both of the English counties the station covers have no BBC local radio station for their whole area. In Staffordshire, the south is covered by BBC Radio WM, and the east by BBC Radio Derby. In Cheshire, north-western areas are served by BBC Radio Merseyside and the north-east by BBC Radio Manchester.

The station broadcasts from its studios on Cheapside in Hanley, the biggest of the six towns that make up the city of Stoke-on-Trent. There are also studios and offices in Crewe, Leek and Stafford.

The current Managing Editors are Alistair Miskin and Tim Beech.

== Technical ==
Radio Stoke transmits on 94.6 MHz FM from the 140 feet (43 m) Alsagers Bank transmitter, which is two miles west of Newcastle-under-Lyme, close to the M6. The signal is clear in most of the area, except in some parts of the Staffordshire Moorlands (Cheadle in particular) and Stafford (which has its own relay).

The 104.1 MHz FM frequency is heard in Stafford and the transmitter is on the roof of the County Education building in the town.

DAB signals come from the Stoke & Stafford 12D multiplex from Alsagers Bank, Pye Green (near Hednesford), Sutton Common (between Congleton and Macclesfield in Cheshire), and Tick Hill (strongest power, south-east of the junction of the A520 and A52 near the Foxfield Steam Railway between Cookshill and Godleybrook). The Sideway transmitter is right next to the A500 D Road, just south of the A50 junction.

The station also broadcasts on Freeview TV channel 715 in the BBC West Midlands and BBC North West regions and streams online via BBC Sounds.

=== FM tuning details ===
Transmitter	Frequency (MHz)	Polarization	Power (watts)
Alsagers Bank	94.6	Mixed	6,100
Stafford	104.1	Vertical	70

== Programming ==
Local programming is produced and broadcast from the BBC's Stoke-on-Trent studios from 6 a.m. to 10 p.m. each day.

The station's late show, airing from 10 p.m. to 1 a.m., originates from BBC Radio WM in Birmingham.

During the station's downtime, BBC Radio Stoke simulcasts overnight programming from BBC Radio 5 Live.

== Presenters ==
Breakfast - Lee Blakeman

Mornings - Stuart George

Sport at Six - Lucas Yeomans, Phil Bowers, Sam Fletcher, Max Hayes

== Football Commentators ==
Crewe Alexandra Graham McGarry

Port Vale Phil Bowers

Stoke City Mark Elliott
