= Listed buildings in Distington =

Distington is a civil parish in the Cumberland district of Cumbria, England. It contains six listed buildings that are recorded in the National Heritage List for England. All the listed buildings are designated at Grade II, the lowest of the three grades, which is applied to "buildings of national importance and special interest". The parish contains the village of Distington and the surrounding countryside. The listed buildings comprise the ruins of a former church, the ruins of a former tower house, a closed Methodist church, an active church, a farmhouse and associated buildings, and a milestone.

== Buildings ==
Name and location	Photograph	Date	Notes
Chancel arch 54.59802°N 3.54301°W	—	Late 13th to 14th century	The chancel arch of the former medieval St Cuthbert's Church is in the churchyard of Holy Spirit Church. It consists of a pointed arch with two chamfered orders, flanked by rendered walls.
Hayes Castle; 54.58864°N 3.54712°W	—	1322 or before	Originally a tower house on a motte, with a curtain wall and a moat, now a ruin. Only the north wall remains; it is in sandstone with a rubble core, and is about 4 feet (1.2 m) thick and 20 feet (6.1 m) high. The structure is also a scheduled monument.
Stubsgill Farmhouse and associated structures 54.59204°N 3.52050°W	—	1681	The house has since been altered and extended. It is pebbledashed with a slate roof, two storeys, seven bays, and a rear outshut. All the windows are 20th-century double-glazed. The area wall is about 4 feet (1.2 m) high, it has flat coping, and contains square rusticated gate piers with corniced caps. The byre to the southwest has quoins, chamfered eaves, and a slate roof. It has two storeys and four bays, and contains a door in each floor, and blocked doors and windows.
Methodist Church, wall and gate 54.58924°N 3.54174°W	—	1838	The former Methodist church is in stone with a slate roof, a single tall storey, and three bays. It has a symmetrical front, with double doors and a semicircular fanlight, flanked by windows with semicircular heads, and surrounds with imposts and keystones. The area wall is about 6 feet (1.8 m) high, and has semicircular coping and a cast iron central gate.
Milestone; 54.59149°N 3.54094°W	—	Mid 19th century	The milestone is in sandstone, and consists of a squared block with a chamfered top, about 2 feet (0.61 m) high, set diagonally to the road. On the south face is a rectangular cast iron plate showing the distances in miles to Workington and to Cockermouth. The plate from the north side is missing.
Holy Spirit Church; 54.59773°N 3.54277°W		1884–86	The church, designed by Hay and Henderson, is in sandstone on a chamfered plinth, with quoins, stepped buttresses, and a slate roof with copings, decorative ridge tiles, and apex crosses. The church consists of a nave with a clerestory, aisles, a south porch, a chancel, and an uncompleted three-stage tower, incorporating a vestry, offset to the south. The east window consists of five stepped lancets.
