= Lowca Beck =

River in Cumbria, England

Coordinates: 54.5751°N 3.5808°W

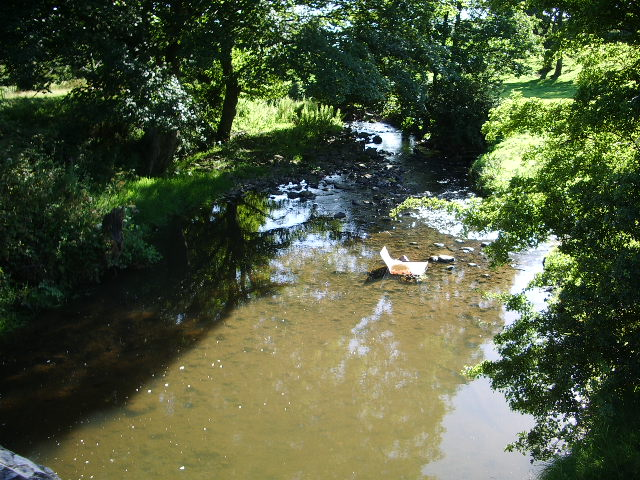

Lowca Beck is a beck in the county of Cumbria, England.

The beck rises (as Distington Beck) in the vicinity of Gilgarran and flows by Distington and the remains of Hayes Castle before flowing between Lowca and Howgate, emptying into the Solway Firth at Parton Bay.
