= Compton =

Compton may refer to:

== Places ==
=== Canada ===
- Compton (federal electoral district), a former Quebec federal electoral district
- Compton (provincial electoral district), a former Quebec provincial electoral district now part of Mégantic-Compton
- Compton, Quebec
- Compton County, Quebec
- Compton Creek, a tributary of the Adam River on Vancouver Island, British Columbia
- Compton Island, in the Queen Charlotte Strait region of British Columbia
- Compton Névé, a névé (icefield) in the Pacific Ranges, British Columbia
  - Compton Glacier, a glacier in the Compton Névé, Pacific Ranges, British Columbia
  - Compton Mountain, a mountain in the Compton Névé, Pacific Ranges, British Columbia

=== England ===
- Compton, Berkshire
- Compton, Derbyshire, a location in Ashbourne parish
- Compton, Plymouth, Devon
- Compton, South Hams, a location
- Compton, Test Valley, a location
- Compton, Hampshire, in Winchester district
- Compton, Staffordshire, a location
- Compton, Guildford, Surrey
- Compton, Waverley, Surrey (near Farnham)
- Compton, West Sussex
- Compton, West Yorkshire, a former village
- Compton, Wiltshire
- Compton, Wolverhampton, West Midlands
- Clifton and Compton, a civil parish in Derbyshire
- Compton and Shawford, a civil parish in Hampshire
- Compton Beauchamp, Oxfordshire
- Compton Bishop, Somerset
- Compton Chamberlayne, Wiltshire
- Compton Dando, Somerset
- Compton Dundon, Somerset
- Compton Martin, Somerset
- Compton Pauncefoot, Somerset
- Fenny Compton, Warwickshire
- Little Compton, Warwickshire
- Over Compton, Dorset
- Nether Compton, Dorset

=== United States ===
- Compton, Arkansas, an unincorporated community
- Compton, California, a city south-southeast of downtown Los Angeles
- Compton, Illinois, a village
- Compton, Maryland, an unincorporated community
- Compton, Virginia, an unincorporated community
- Compton Township, Otter Tail County, Minnesota
- Little Compton, Missouri
- Little Compton, Rhode Island

== Music ==
- Compton (album), by Dr. Dre, 2015
- "Compton" (song), by Kendrick Lamar, 2012
- "Compton", a song by the Game from Doctor's Advocate, 2006
- "Compton", a song by Guerilla Black from Guerilla City, 2004

== Science and technology ==
- Compton (crater), a lunar crater
- Compton (software), an X composite manager; third-degree fork of Xcompmgr
- Compton Gamma Ray Observatory, a space observatory operational in Earth orbit from 1991 to 2000
- Compton Limestone, a geologic unit in Missouri
- Compton scattering, an effect observed when photons interact with electrons
- Compton wavelength, a quantum mechanical property of a particle

== Other uses ==
- Compton (surname), a surname (including a list of people with the name)
- Compton (Trappe, Maryland), a home
- Compton Petroleum, a petroleum exploration company based in Canada
