= Waberthwaite =

Settlement in Cumbria, England

Coordinates: 54.331°N 3.3717°W

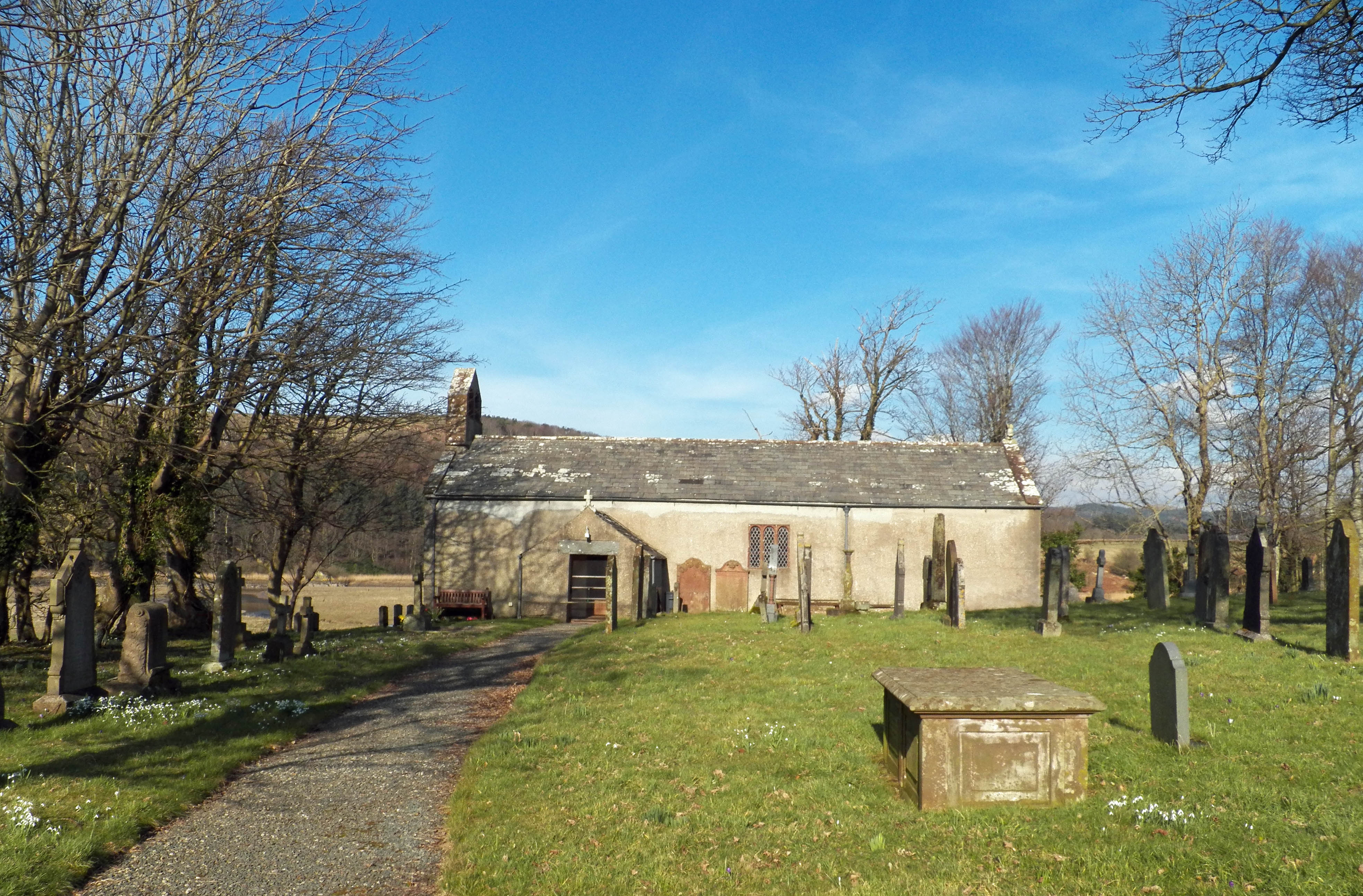
- Waberthwaite church

- Location in Copeland Borough Location within Cumbria
- Population: 230 (2011)
- OS grid reference: SD172802
- Civil parish: Waberthwaite & Corney
- Unitary authority: Cumberland
- Ceremonial county: Cumbria
- Region: North West
- Country: England
- Sovereign state: United Kingdom
- Post town: Millom
- Postcode district: LA19
- Dialling code: 01229
- Police: Cumbria
- Fire: Cumbria
- Ambulance: North West
- UK Parliament: Barrow and Furness

Waberthwaite is a small, former rural civil parish (about 4 square miles in area) on the south bank of the estuary of the River Esk, in Cumberland, Cumbria, England. Since 1934 it has been part of the combined parish of Waberthwaite and Corney, which covers 10 square miles and has a population of 246 (2011 census). It is located opposite Muncaster Castle and the village of Ravenglass which lie on the north bank of the Esk. It is well known for its Cumberland sausages, and lists among its other assets a granite quarry that is a Site of Special Scientific Interest (SSSI); the Esk estuary, which forms part of the Drigg Coast Special Area of Conservation (SAC) - a designation for areas of European importance; the 800-year-old St. John's Church, and the remains of two Anglian/Norse crosses of an earlier period. Archeological finds within 3 kilometres of Waberthwaite indicate that the area has been continuously inhabited since Mesolithic times (i.e. from around 5500 BC).

== Toponymy ==
Linguistic authorities affirm that the name Waberthwaite was originally Old Norse Veiðr buð þveit, meaning hunting or fishing booth clearing. Earliest spellings of the name (from 12th and 13th century documents) such as Waythebuthwayt and Wayburthwayt are consistent with the Old Norse origin. An alternative postulate that the name is connected with the Wybergh family who later settled in St Bees. Clifton and Isel has been strongly refuted by Mary Fair.

== History ==
W. G. Collingwood has identified the earlier of the two cross shafts, which lies at the foot of the later upright cross shaft in Waberthwaite churchyard, as being Anglian in the style of its decoration, and dated it as no earlier than 850 and no later than 925 when Norse settlement of the west coast of Cumbria began. Based on affinities between the carving on this cross and work at Lancaster, he postulates that there was a monastic cell of the Anglian church of Lancaster at Waberthwaite. He identifies the upright cross shaft as being of a later period and predominantly Norse in character. He postulates that when the Norse settlers arrived at Waberthwaite they adopted the church and raised the second cross in about 950. It was presumably at that time that they gave the settlement of Waberthwaite its name. What it might have been called by the Anglians, or the Britons before them, we have no way of knowing.

In 945 the English King Edmund I overran all Cumberland which was then part of the British Kingdom of Strathclyde, and ceded it to Malcolm I, King of Scots. It changed hands a number of times after that, but at the time of the Norman Conquest (1066) most of modern-day Cumbria was held by the Scottish king Malcolm III, though the southern territories of Furness, Cartmel and the Manor of Hougun (which included Millom and extended as far north as Bootle, Cumbria), were held by the Saxon earl, Tostig Godwinson, and were regarded as part of his Yorkshire lands. The Norman conquerors took over Tostig's lands and seemed content to have them as the northern border of England. By the time of the compilation of the Domesday Book in 1086, the Normans had not encroached beyond the 1066 boundaries, and Bootle was still the northern limit of their holdings in West Cumberland. Waberthwaite is not mentioned in the Domesday Book, so it appears that it was the southern limit of land held by King Malcolm III in West Cumberland, though it had been settled by Norsemen by then, or possibly it was a no-man's land remote from proper control by Malcolm III and of no value or interest to the Normans.

William Rufus invaded Cumberland and established Norman control and rule over all of it in 1092. Around 1120 William's successor, Henry I, created the Barony of Copeland (later called the Barony of Egremont) in Cumberland. The barony included the Lordship of Millom, which stretched from the River Esk to the River Duddon, and the Manor of Waberthwaite formed its north-western extremity. Around the middle of the 12th Century Arthur De Boyvill, 3rd Lord of Millom, granted the manor of Waberthwaite to Hugh, the husband of a female relative, who then assumed the name "de Wayburthwait". Hugh de Waberthwaite appears in various documents written between 1170 and 1200. In 1381, James, the last of the male de Wayburthwait line, granted the manor of Waberthwaite and the advowson of its church of St James (now St John's) to Thomas de Berdesey, who transferred it to Sir Richard de Kyrkeby in 1391. James had died by then, and the manor was held in dower by James's widow Isabell and could only revert to Sir Richard de Kyrkeby after her death. The advowson remained in the hands of the Kirkbys until about 1608, when it passed to the Pennington family, who also became Lords of the Manor.

== The de Waberthwaite family succession ==
The following is based on work by the Reverend W.S. Sykes.

- Hugh: The first de Waberthwaite. First appears in documents between 1160 and 1170. Died about 1208.
- William: Succeeded his father, Hugh. Appears in a number of documents between 1215 and 1230.
- Adam: Succeeded his father, William. Died between 1248 and 1250.
- William: Son and successor of Adam. Married Ydonea daughter of Sir Richard de Copeland of Bootle. Appears in documents between 1250 and 1292.
- Adam: Son and successor of William. Died without issue and the manor passed to his younger brother John.
- John: Succeeded his elder brother Adam as Lord of the Manor in 1347. His son, William, was rector of Waberthwaite church in 1383.
- James: Succeeded his father, John, by 1365. Married Isabella, but had no heirs.

== Education ==
There has been a school in the parish since 1818. The original school was located at Lane End in the building now called "The Old School House". The building was extended in 1873 to accommodate an increased number of school children. The present school is a Church of England primary school built in 1938 at Lane End across the road from the old school, which it replaced.

== The quarry ==
The quarry, variously referred to Waberthwaite Quarry or Broadoak Quarry, is an outcrop of Eskdale Granite which was injected into the Earth's crust from below in the Ordovician period, around 450 million years ago. It is now an SSSI because its faces and outcrops provide excellent exposure of granodiorite rock, which is an unusual variety of Eskdale granite and is seldom well-exposed

The quarrying and agricultural engineering company Ord and Maddison started extracting rock from the quarry in about 1883, but ceased operations in the 1890s because of transport difficulties in getting their product up a steep hill to the main road from where it could be taken by truck and steam engine to Eskmealas railway station.

In 1905, the Eskmeals Granite Company took over the quarry and subsequently reached agreement with the Caddys of Rougholme for the erection of an aerial ropeway that could carry stone from the quarry over Caddy land to the railway sidings at Monk Moors near Eskmeals. This greatly ameliorated the transport problems and enabled extensive quarrying. By 1913 the quarry was well equipped with stone breaking machinery, rotary screens, cubing mill, a steam loco, cranes, compressed air rock drills, and an aerial ropeway that carried the quarry products to a railway siding at Monk Moors. Its output of granite kerbs, channels, setts, macadam, and crushed granite reached a total of about 25,000 tons per annum that year. In 1926 it provided road stone for the widening of the main road through the parish. Thereafter the quarry began to decline, and in 1930 the Eskmeals Granite Company ceased operations.

A new company, the Broadoak Granite Company, was founded by the rector of Waberthwaite, Revd. Parminter, and took over the operations at the quarry in 1932. The new company replaced the aerial ropeway with two Bedford trucks and ran operations on a smaller scale, but it struggled, and despite a slight recovery during the Second World War, the quarry closed in 1946. Since then some stone has occasionally been taken for specific purposes, one example being the use of Waberthwaite granite for the cladding of a building at London airport in 1979. At its height the quarry employed about 50 men.

== Gallery ==
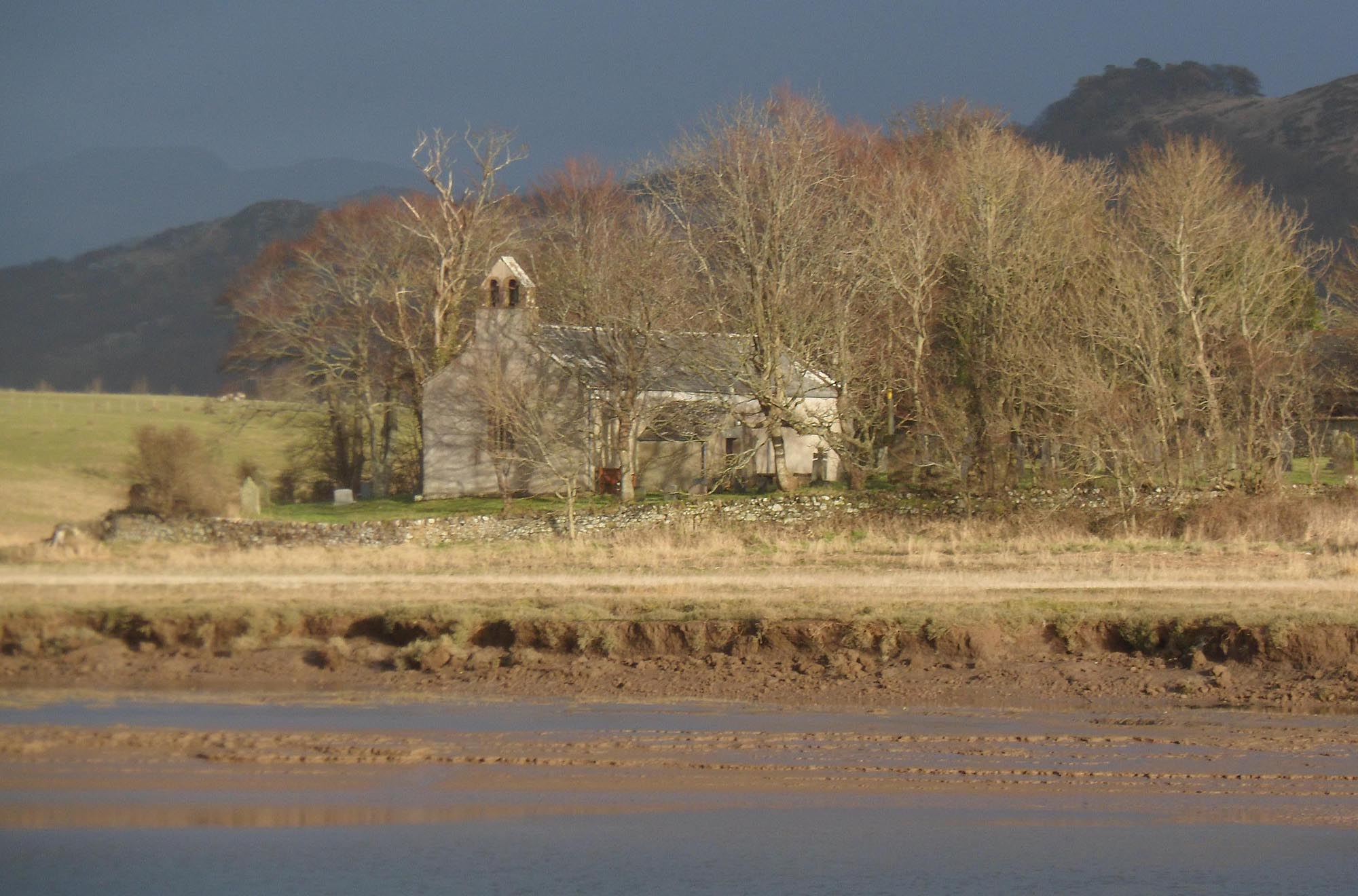
St John's Church, Waberthwaite, from across the Esk

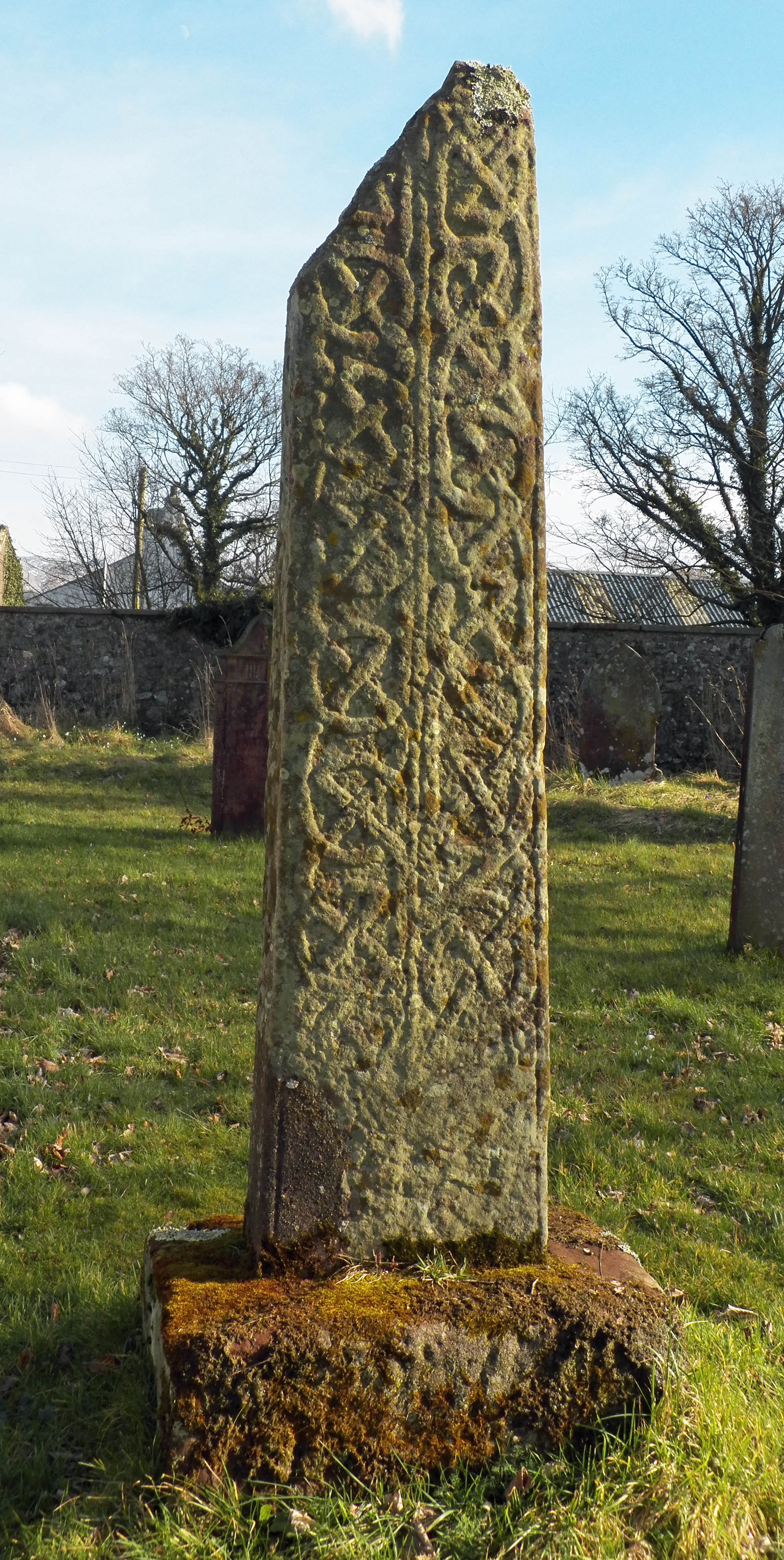
The large cross shaft - 10th century or earlier.

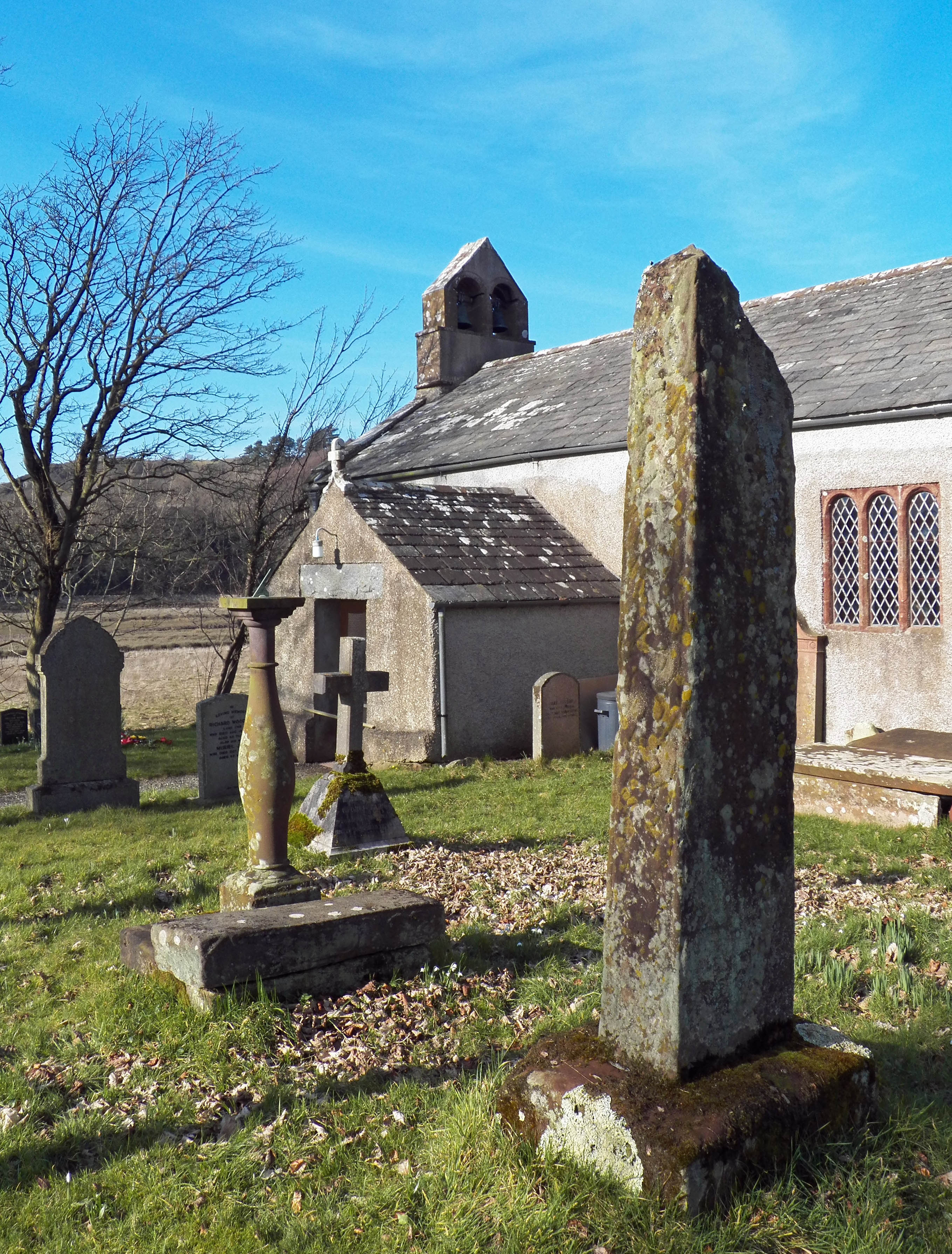
Waberthwaite church and cross

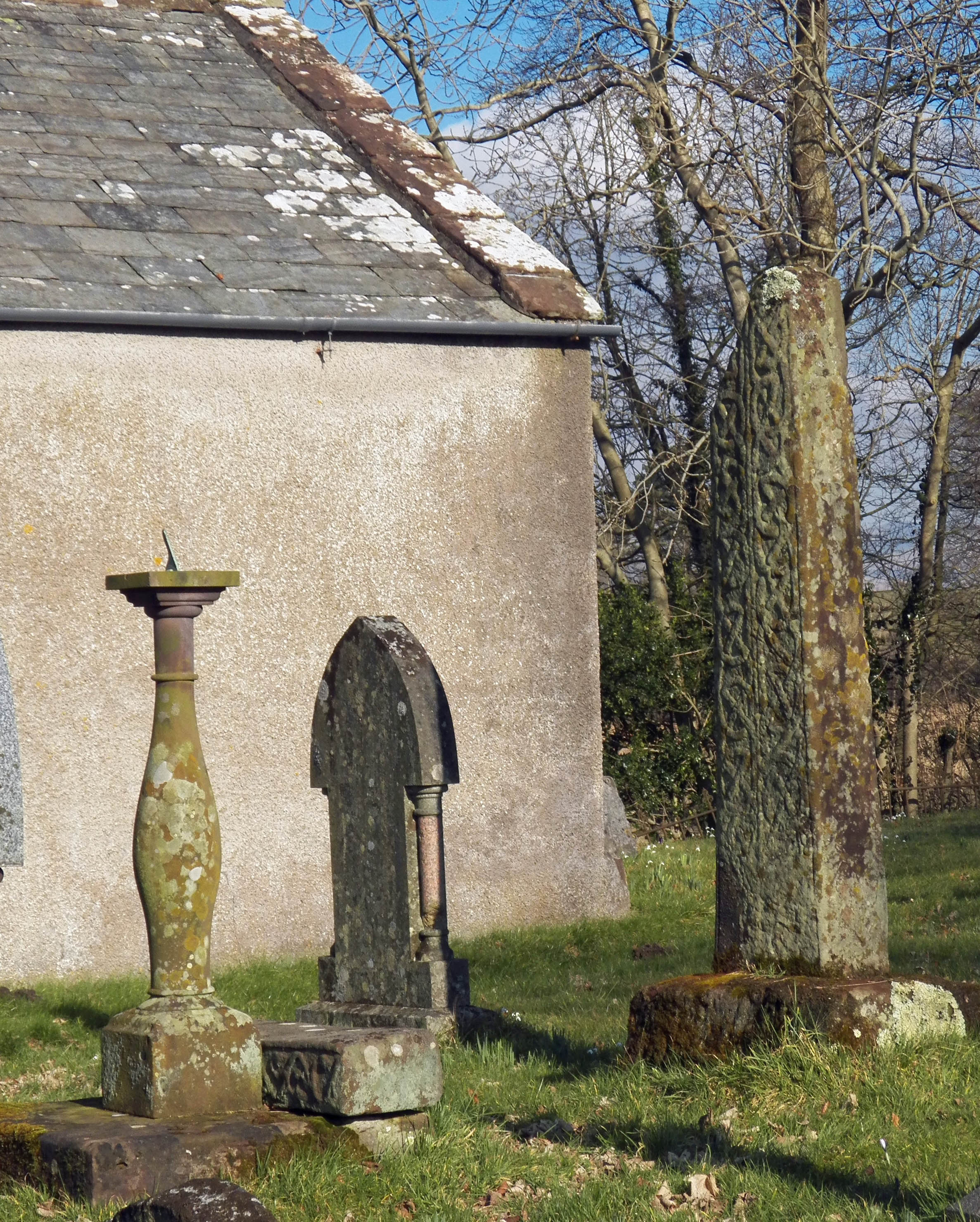
View of both cross shafts

== See also ==
- Listed buildings in Waberthwaite
- St John's Church, Waberthwaite
