= Cop Mere =

Protected body of water in Staffordshire, England

- Site of Special Scientific Interest
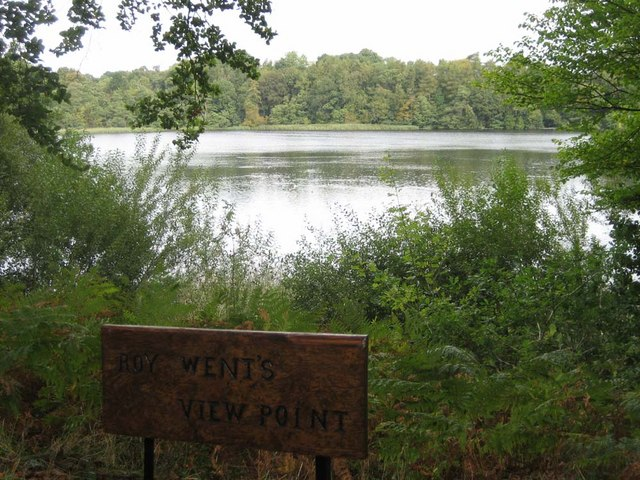

- Location within Staffordshire
- Location of Cop Mere.
- Area of search: Staffordshire
- Grid reference: SJ802297
- Coordinates: 52.86487°N 2.29481°W
- Interest: Biological
- Area: 93.4 acres (0.3780 km^{2}; 0.1459 sq mi)
- Notification date: 1968

Cop Mere is one of the largest natural bodies of water in Staffordshire, England, covering 42 acres (17 ha). It has been designated a SSSI as an oligotrophic mire rich in Sphagnum moss, and other plant and animal life are present in sufficient numbers and rarities for it to have been designated as a protected area since 1968.

Cop Mere was created as a hollow in the Keuper marl of North Staffordshire/South Cheshire (which was laid down approx 200 million years ago, roughly) as a result of the retreat of the last ice age. It differs from other ponds and meres in the region because it sits on the route of the River Sow, the flow of which encourages the growth of algae necessary for the growth of freshwater mosses. The River Sow has been dammed upstream at Jackson's Coppice from around AD 1250, which altered the flow of water and created a unique albeit man-made environment that encourages birdlife and fishlife. There is evidence that fishing in Cop Mere dates back at least to the reign of Henry VIII. Entomologists have recorded the presence of two uncommon species each of beetle and fly.

The SSSI also includes a number of plants currently rare in Staffordshire, specifically herb paris (Paris quadrifolia) and the thin-spiked wood sedge, Carex strigosa. Birds commonly found on the mere include the reed warbler and sedge warbler, the great crested grebe and the little grebe, the sparrowhawk, and three woodpecker, species including the lesser spotted woodpecker.

Cop Mere is used for coarse fishing and the British record for rod caught common bream has twice been held by fish landed at Cop Mere, although today the main fish angled for is the tench while there are also perch, roach and pike in the mere's waters.

== See also ==
- Copmere End
