= Distington =

Village and civil parish in Cumbria, England

Coordinates: 54.60°N 3.54°W

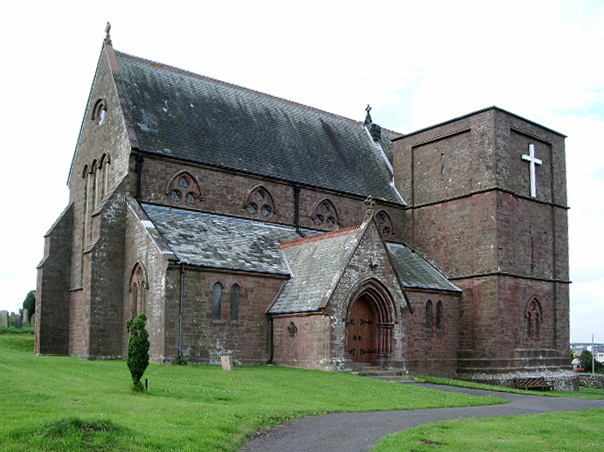
- The Church of the Holy Spirit, Distington

- Location in Copeland Borough Location within Cumbria
- Population: 2,256 (2011)
- OS grid reference: NY0023
- Civil parish: Distington
- Unitary authority: Cumberland
- Ceremonial county: Cumbria
- Region: North West
- Country: England
- Sovereign state: United Kingdom
- Post town: WORKINGTON
- Postcode district: CA14
- Dialling code: 01946
- Police: Cumbria
- Fire: Cumbria
- Ambulance: North West
- UK Parliament: Whitehaven and Workington

Distington (/ˈdɪzɪŋtən/) is a large village and civil parish in Cumbria, England, 3 miles (4.8 km) south of Workington and 4 miles (6.4 km) north of Whitehaven. Historically a part of Cumberland, the civil parish includes the nearby settlements of Common End, Gilgarran and Pica. The parish had a population of 2,247 in the 2001 census, increasing slightly to 2,256 at the 2011 census.

South of the village by the Lowca Beck are the fragmentary remains of Hayes Castle, a manor house fortified by Robert de Leyburn in 1322.

== Governance ==
Distington is in the parliamentary constituency of Whitehaven and Workington.

For Local Government purposes it is in the Cumberland unitary authority area.

The village also has its own Parish Council; Distington Parish Council. The parish council ward stretches beyond the confines of Distington parish with a total population taken at the Census 2011 of 4,058.

== Transport ==
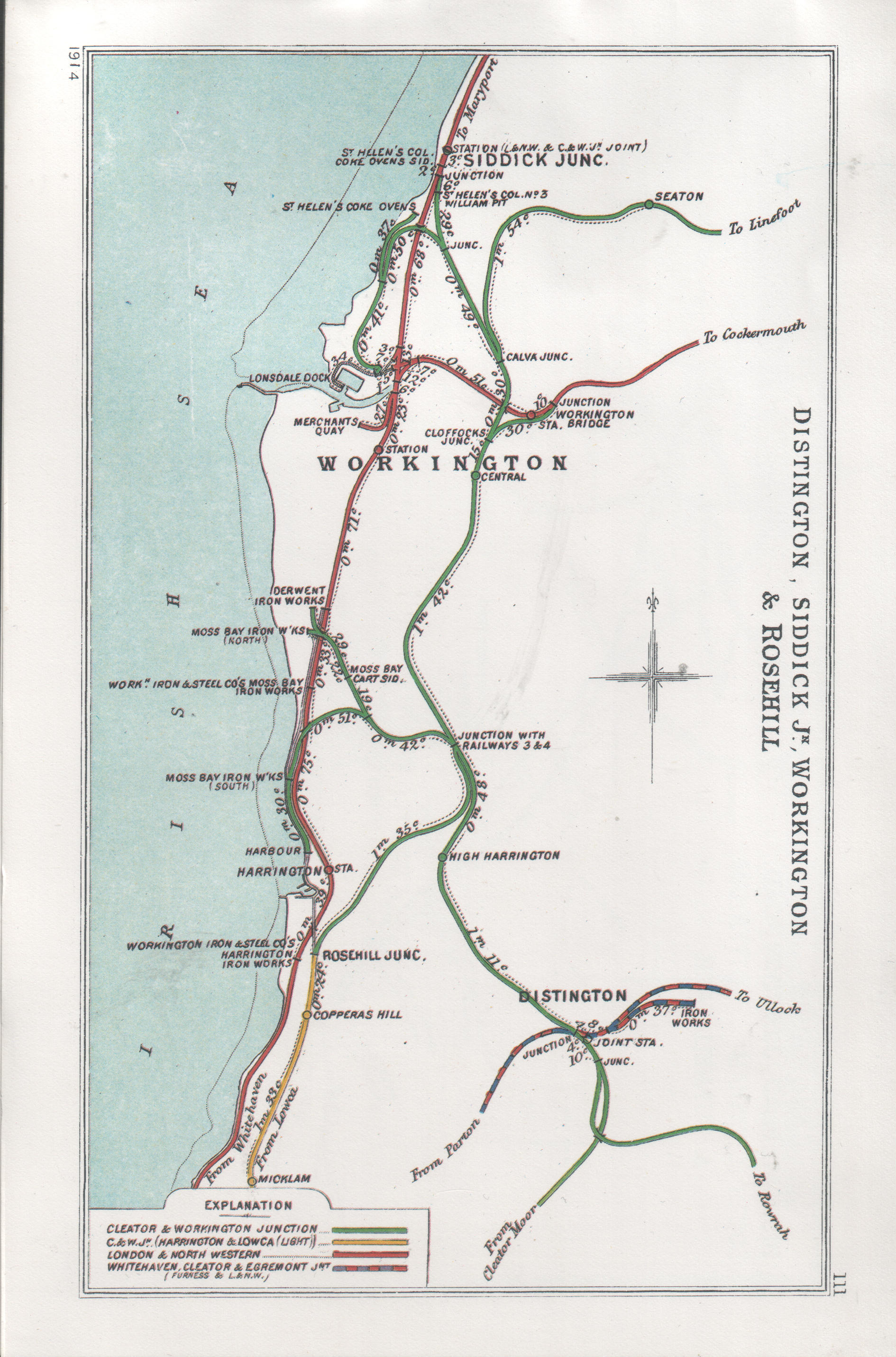
Railway Junction Diagram showing the complex network which existed in the Workington area and the importance of Distington

The main road through Distington is the A595. There was once a railway station at Distington on the Cleator and Workington Junction Railway which was an important junction.

Today Harrington railway station, on the Cumbria Coast Line, is the nearest operational station.

== See also ==
- Listed buildings in Distington
- Distington railway station
