= Listed buildings in Waberthwaite =

Waberthwaite is a civil parish in the Cumberland district, Cumbria, England. It contains six listed buildings that are recorded in the National Heritage List for England. Of these, one is listed at Grade II*, the middle of the three grades, and the others are at Grade II, the lowest grade. The parish contains the villages of Waberthwaite, Newbiggin, and Corney, and is otherwise rural. The listed buildings comprise a church, a sundial in the churchyard, farmhouses, and a guidestone.

== Key ==
| Grade | Criteria |
|---|---|
| II* | Particularly important buildings of more than special interest |
| II | Buildings of national importance and special interest |

== Buildings ==
| Name and location | Photograph | Date | Notes | Grade |
|---|---|---|---|---|
| St John's Church; 54.34366°N 3.38552°W | | 13th century (probable) | The bellcote was added in 1796, the interior was restored in 1807, and the porch was rebuilt in 1825. The church is in roughcast stone, and has a slate roof with stone copings. It is in a single cell, it has a gabled south porch with internal stone benches, and a gabled bellcote on the west gable. The windows are mullioned. | II* |
| Low Kinmont Farmhouse; 54.29668°N 3.35627°W | — | Early 18th century (probable) | The farmhouse was extended in 1765, and again later. It is in pebbledashed stone, and has a slate roof with a stone ridge. There are two storeys and three bays, with a one-bay extension to the left, a two-bay recessed extension further to the left, and a rear outshut. The windows are a mix of sashes and casements, and on the front is a datestone. | II |
| Newbiggin House Farm; 54.33418°N 3.39256°W | — | 1768 | A stuccoed house that has a slate roof with stone coping. There are two storeys and a symmetrical three-bay front. In the centre is a doorway, the windows are sashes in stone surrounds, and above the door is a heart-shaped dated and inscribed panel. | II |
| Newbiggin Farmhouse and Cottage; 54.33434°N 3.39344°W | — | 1816 | Originally one farmhouse, later subdivided, with a south wing added in the mid 19th century. The house is in stone, the south wing is pebbledashed, and the roof is slated. There are two storeys, the main part has a symmetrical three-bay front that is flanked by lower single-bay wings. In the centre is a doorway with stone surround and a rectangular fanlight. The windows are sashes; all have stone surrounds other than those in the south wing that have segmental heads. | II |
| Sundial; 54.34357°N 3.38547°W | | 1830 | The sundial is in the churchyard of St John's Church. It is in sandstone, about 5.5 feet (1.7 m) high, and has a moulded square plinth, a turned shaft, and a moulded square top with an inscribed circular brass plate and a gnomon. | II |
| Guidestone; 54.31802°N 3.36059°W | — | Early to mid 19th century (probable) | The guidestone sits on top of a boulder wall. It consists of a square sandstone block measuring 3 feet (0.91 m) on the sides and 1 foot (0.30 m) high. On two faces are inscriptions indicating the directions to Broughton and to Whitehaven by different routes. | II |
