= Connon =

Hamlet in Cornwall, England

Coordinates: 50.4371°N 4.5488°W

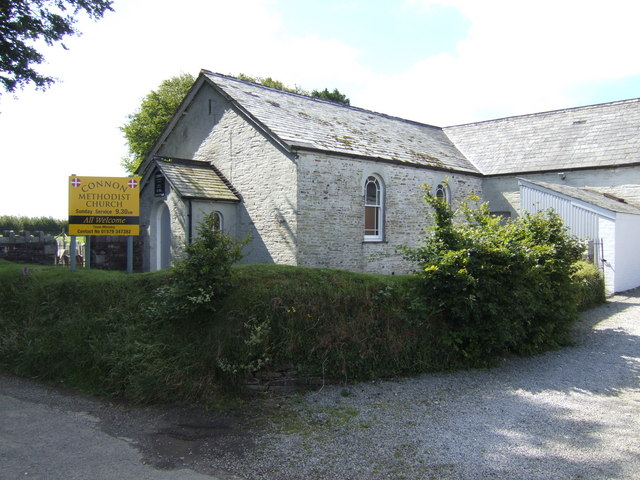
Connon Methodist Church

Connon is a hamlet near Liskeard in Cornwall, England. Connon is in the civil parish of St Pinnock.
