= Cooksmill Green =

Hamlet in Essex, England

Coordinates: 51.732°N 0.371°E

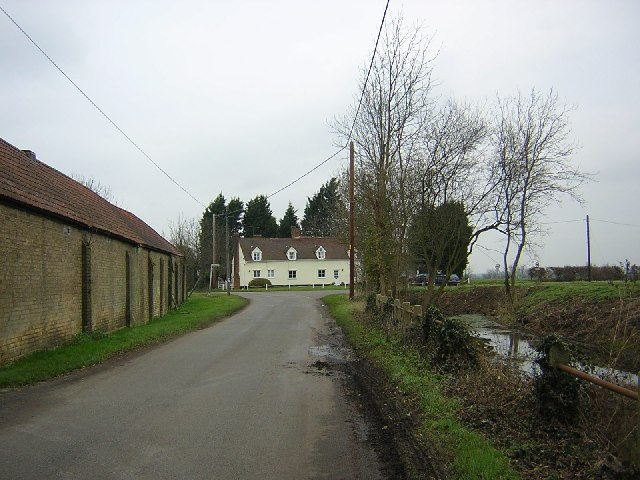
- Cottage at north end of Cooksmill Green

- Location within Essex
- OS grid reference: TL7107
- Civil parish: Roxwell; Highwood
- District: Chelmsford
- Shire county: Essex
- Region: East
- Country: England
- Sovereign state: United Kingdom
- Post town: CHELMSFORD
- Postcode district: CM1
- Dialling code: 01245
- Police: Essex
- Fire: Essex
- Ambulance: East of England

Cooksmill Green is a hamlet in the civil parish of Highwood in the Chelmsford district of Essex, England. It is situated approximately 4 miles (6 km) west from the centre of the county town of Chelmsford. The A414 road is less than one mile to the south.
