= Cooklaw =

Former civil parish in Northumberland, England

Coordinates: 55.038°N 2.103°W

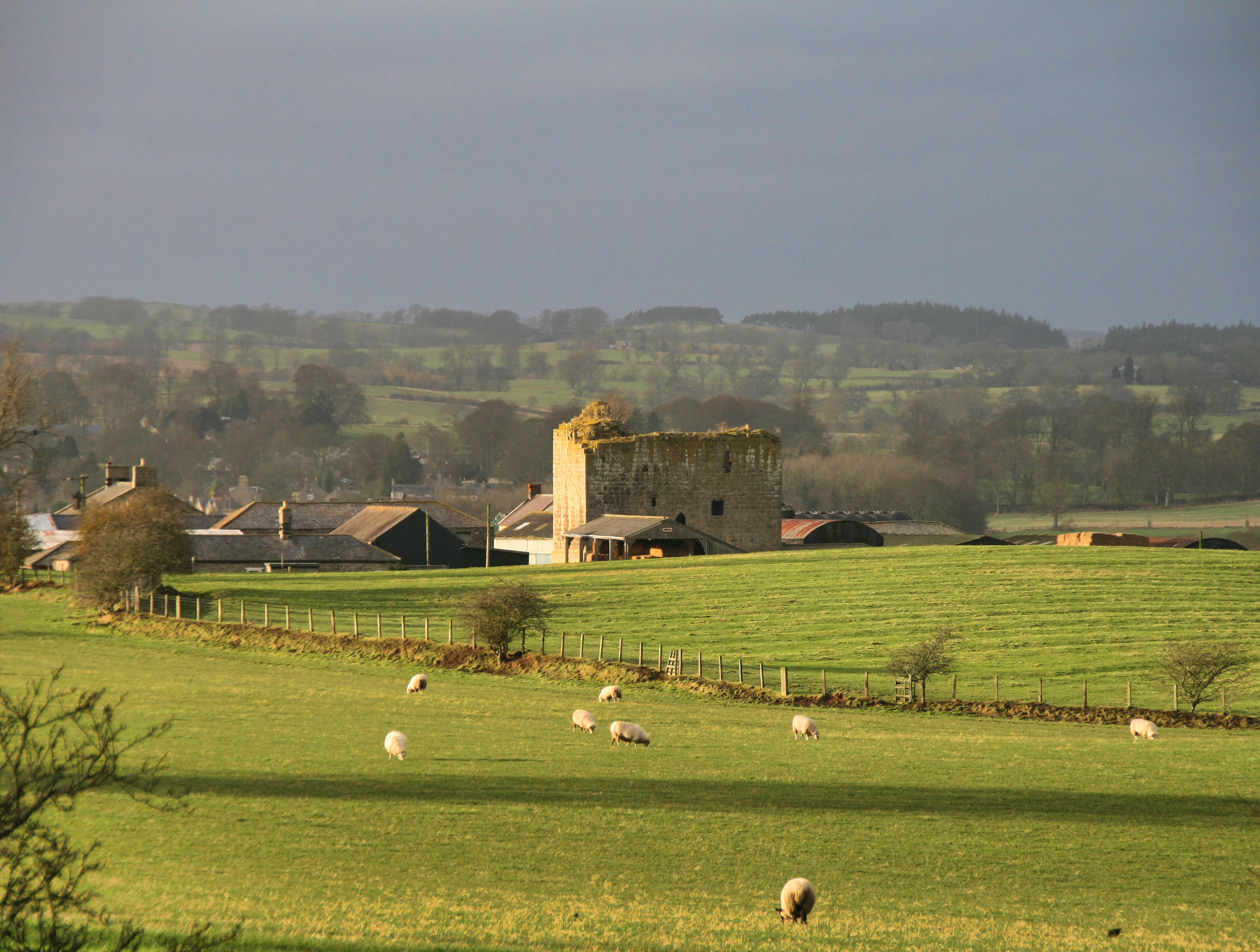

- Location within Northumberland
- OS grid reference: NY935715
- Civil parish: Wall
- Unitary authority: Northumberland
- Ceremonial county: Northumberland
- Region: North East
- Country: England
- Sovereign state: United Kingdom
- Post town: HEXHAM
- Postcode district: NE46
- Police: Northumbria
- Fire: Northumberland
- Ambulance: North East
- UK Parliament: Hexham

Cooklaw is a small settlement and (as Cocklaw) a former civil parish, now in the parish of Wall, in Northumberland, England. It is near the A6079 road and the River North Tyne. In 1951 the parish had a population of 119.

== Governance ==
Cooklaw is in the parliamentary constituency of Hexham. Cocklaw was formerly a township in St. John-Lee parish, from 1866 Cocklaw was a civil parish in its own right until it was abolished on 1 April 1955 and merged with Wall.
