= Coombesdale =

Settlement in Staffordshire, England

Coordinates: 52.93°N 02.29°W

- Location within Staffordshire
- OS grid reference: SJ8038
- Shire county: Staffordshire
- Region: West Midlands
- Country: England
- Sovereign state: United Kingdom
- Post town: Newcastle
- Postcode district: ST5
- Police: Staffordshire
- Fire: Staffordshire
- Ambulance: West Midlands

Coombesdale is a small settlement in Staffordshire, in the West Midlands region of England. It is near the A51 road and is 6 kilometres (4 mi) southwest of the city of Stoke-on-Trent.
