= Copmere End =

Coordinates: 52.85°N 02.29°W

- Location within Staffordshire
- OS grid reference: SJ8029
- Shire county: Staffordshire
- Region: West Midlands
- Country: England
- Sovereign state: United Kingdom
- Post town: Stafford
- Postcode district: ST21
- Police: Staffordshire
- Fire: Staffordshire
- Ambulance: West Midlands

Copmere End is a small settlement in Staffordshire, England. It is 2 kilometres (1 mi) west of Eccleshall where the population taken for the 2011 census can be found. It is named for the lake, Cop Mere. There is a public house there called the Star Inn.
