= Cooper's Green =

Hamlet in East Sussex, England

Coordinates: 50.991140°N 0.104023°E

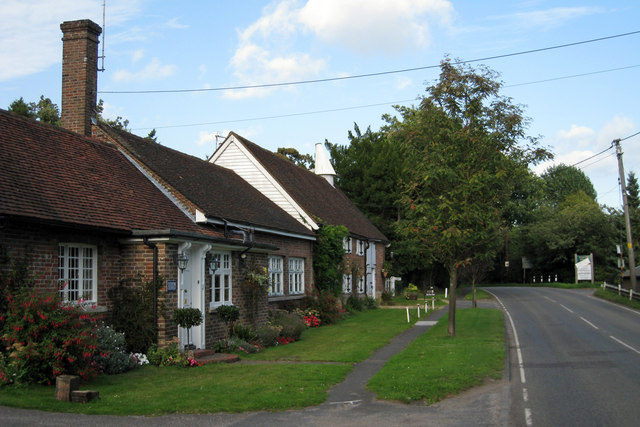

- Location within East Sussex
- OS grid reference: TQ4776023411
- Civil parish: Buxted
- District: Wealden
- Shire county: East Sussex
- Region: South East
- Country: England
- Sovereign state: United Kingdom
- Post town: UCKFIELD
- Postcode district: TN22
- Police: Sussex
- Fire: East Sussex
- Ambulance: South East Coast
- UK Parliament: Wealden

Cooper's Green is a hamlet in the civil parish of Buxted in the Wealden district of East Sussex, England. Its nearest town is Uckfield, which lies approximately 1.3 miles (2.1 km) south-west from the village.
