= Combridge =

Settlement in Staffordshire, England

Coordinates: 52.938°N 1.861°W

- Location within Staffordshire
- OS grid reference: SK0937
- Shire county: Staffordshire
- Region: West Midlands
- Country: England
- Sovereign state: United Kingdom
- Post town: Uttoxeter
- Postcode district: ST14 5
- Police: Staffordshire
- Fire: Staffordshire
- Ambulance: West Midlands

Combridge is a small settlement in Staffordshire, England, near the town of Uttoxeter. It is in the parish of Rocester, a little to the south of the village of that name. For population details as taken at the 2011 census see Rocester.

The River Churnet enters the River Dove here. Combridge was formerly on the now-defunct North Staffordshire Railway.
