= Coppathorne =

Coordinates: 50°46′36″N 4°32′30″W

Coppathorne: Cornish: Sperntrogh
- Hamlet
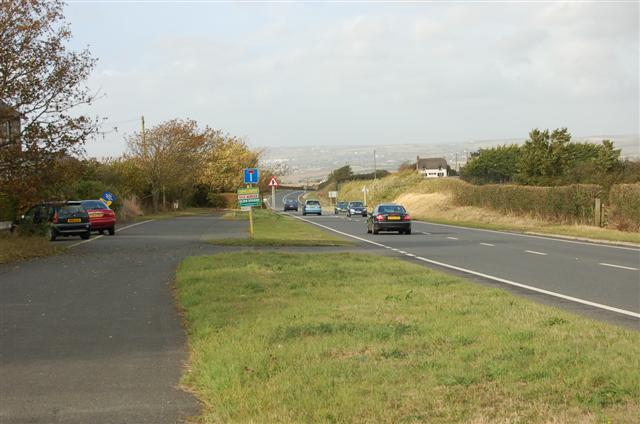

- Location within Cornwall
- Unitary authority: Cornwall
- Region: South West
- Country: England
- Sovereign state: United Kingdom
- Police: Devon and Cornwall
- Fire: Cornwall
- Ambulance: South Western

Coppathorne (Cornish: Sperntrogh, meaning coppiced thorn trees) is a hamlet in the parish of Poundstock (where the 2011 census was included), Cornwall, England.
