= Camptown =

Camptown may refer to:

== Places ==
- Camptown, Pennsylvania, United States
- Camptown, Scottish Borders, Scotland
- Camptown, Virginia, United States

== Other uses ==
- Camptown FC, a Guyanese football club that plays in the GFF National Super League
- Camptown Historic District, La Mott, Pennsylvania
- "Camptown Races", an 1850 minstrel song
- Kijichon, term for military base camp towns serving US forces in South Korea
