= Campton, South Carolina =

Unincorporated community in South Carolina, US

Coordinates: 35°01′43″N 82°03′50″W

Campton is an unincorporated community in Spartanburg County, in the U.S. state of South Carolina.

== History ==
A post office called Campton was established in 1875, and remained in operation until 1902. The community was named for Squire "Billy" Camp, an early settler.
