= Combrew =

Village in Devon, England

Coordinates: 51.06°N 04.11°W

- Location within Devon
- OS grid reference: SS5232
- Shire county: Devon
- Region: South West
- Country: England
- Sovereign state: United Kingdom
- Police: Devon and Cornwall
- Fire: Devon and Somerset
- Ambulance: South Western

Combrew is a hamlet in Devon, England. It is near the town of Barnstaple.
