= Conanby =

Suburb of Conisbrough in South Yorkshire, England

Coordinates: 53.482°N 1.243°W

- Location within South Yorkshire
- OS grid reference: SK4998
- Metropolitan borough: Doncaster
- Metropolitan county: South Yorkshire
- Region: Yorkshire and the Humber
- Country: England
- Sovereign state: United Kingdom
- Post town: DONCASTER
- Postcode district: DN12
- Dialling code: 01709
- Police: South Yorkshire
- Fire: South Yorkshire
- Ambulance: Yorkshire

Conanby is a housing estate and suburb of Conisbrough in the Metropolitan Borough of Doncaster, South Yorkshire, England. It lies north of Old Road in Conisbrough on the border with the civil parish of Denaby. Built between 1923 and 1926, the estate consisted of about 400 houses for the families of miners who worked at the Denaby collieries. It had a warm water supply from a central boiler house, which was a novelty at that time. Electricity was originally supplied from Cadeby Main Colliery.
