= Coppicegate =

Settlement in Shropshire, England

Coordinates: 52.418°N 2.388°W

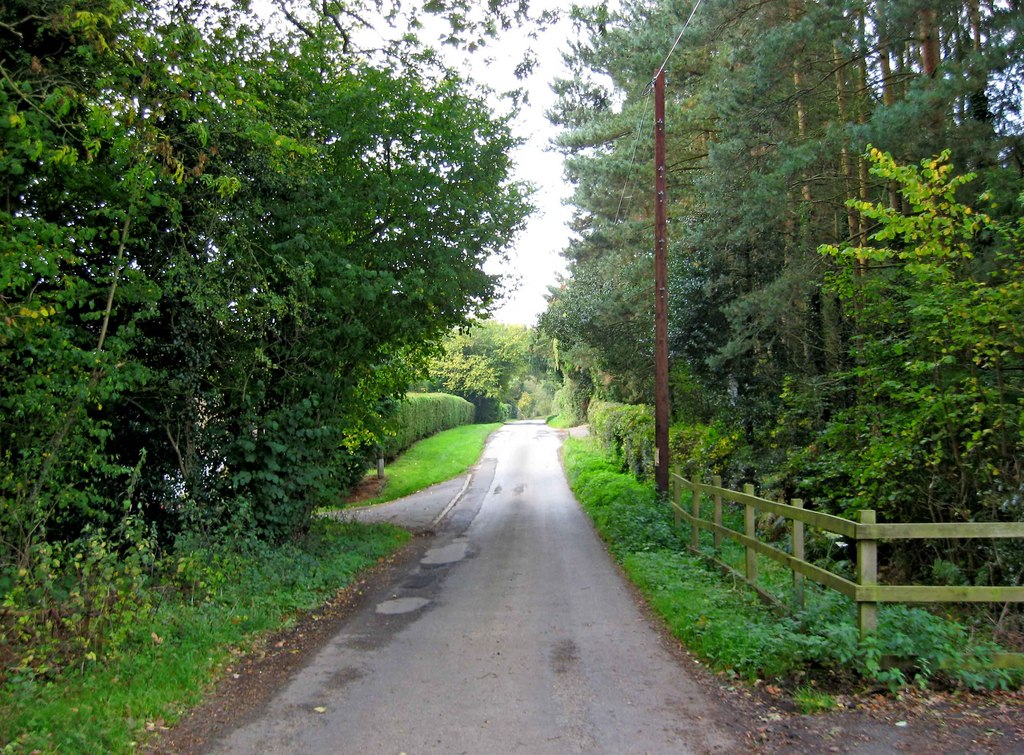
- Button Bridge Lane, Coppicegate

- Location within Shropshire
- OS grid reference: SO736801
- Civil parish: Kinlet
- Unitary authority: Shropshire
- Ceremonial county: Shropshire
- Region: West Midlands
- Country: England
- Sovereign state: United Kingdom
- Post town: BEWDLEY
- Postcode district: DY12
- Dialling code: 01299
- Police: West Mercia
- Fire: Shropshire
- Ambulance: West Midlands
- UK Parliament: Ludlow

Coppicegate is a small settlement in Shropshire, England. It is beside the Wyre Forest and is 5 miles (8 km) north east of Cleobury Mortimer.
