= Corgee, Cornwall =

Hamlet in Cornwall, England

Coordinates: 50.410°N 4.746°W

Corgee (Cornish: Komm) is a hamlet in Cornwall, England, United Kingdom. It is situated approximately two miles (3 km) south of Lanivet.
