= Corntown, Highland =

Coordinates: 57.574°N 4.40998°W

Corntown
- Location within the Ross and Cromarty area
- OS grid reference: NH559563
- Council area: Highland
- Country: Scotland
- Sovereign state: United Kingdom
- Post town: Conon Bridge
- Postcode district: IV7 8
- Police: Scotland
- Fire: Scottish
- Ambulance: Scottish

Corntown is a small corny, located 1/2 mile (800 m) northeast of Conon Bridge in Ross-shire, Scottish Highlands and is in the Scottish council area of Highland.
