= Copthorne, Cornwall =

Coordinates: 50.7016°N 4.460°W

Copthorne: Cornish: Spernentrogh
- Location within Cornwall
- OS grid reference: SX264920
- Civil parish: North Petherwin
- Unitary authority: Cornwall
- Ceremonial county: Cornwall
- Region: South West
- Country: England
- Sovereign state: United Kingdom
- Post town: Launceston
- Postcode district: PL15 9
- Police: Devon and Cornwall
- Fire: Cornwall
- Ambulance: South Western

Copthorne (Cornish: Spernentrogh, meaning coppiced thorn tree) is a hamlet in the parish of North Petherwin, Cornwall, England.
