= Compton Petroleum =

Canadian petroleum company

Compton Petroleum Corporation
- Company type: Public
- Traded as: TSX: CMT; NYSE: CMZ
- Industry: Oil & Gas Drilling & Exploration
- Headquarters: Calgary, Alberta, Canada
- Key people: Tim Granger, P.Eng. President & CEO C.W. Leigh Cassidy, CA, CFA VP Finance & CFO David B. Horn, BA Econ. VP Business Development & Land Marc Junghans, P.Geol. VP Exploration Shannon L. Ouellette, M. Eng., P.Eng. VP Operations & Development
- Revenue: ▲504 million USD (2007)
- Net income: ▲130 million USD (2007)
- Number of employees: 225 (2008)
- Website: www.comptonpetroleum.com

Compton Petroleum Corporation is a Canadian petroleum company based in Calgary, Alberta. It is a public company actively engaged in the exploration, development and production of natural gas, natural gas liquids and crude oil in the Western Canadian Sedimentary Basin.

The company has faced opposition from some residents of Calgary over plans to drill four sour gas wells very near to the southeast quadrant of the city. The Energy and Utilities Board of Alberta has ruled that in the case of a sour gas leak, a circular evacuation zone with a radius of 5 kilometres extending away from the wells would be used. This area encompasses part of the city of Calgary, as well as many kilometres of the Bow River.
