= Common End, Cumbria =

Hamlet in Cumbria, England

Coordinates: 54.586°N 3.540°W

Common End
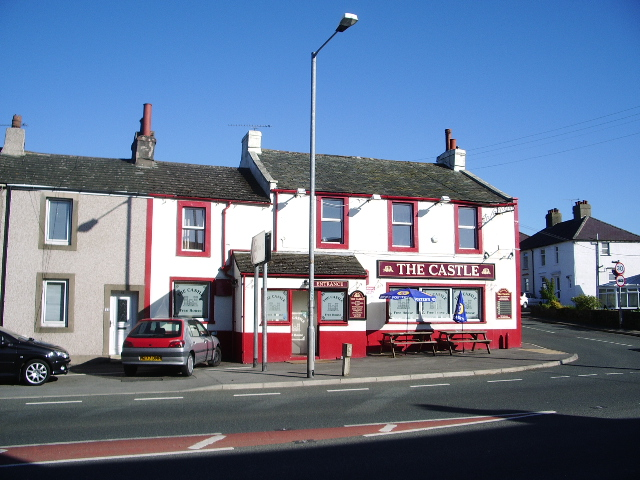
- The Castle public house, Common End

- Location in Copeland Borough Location within Cumbria
- OS grid reference: NY004223
- Civil parish: Distington
- Unitary authority: Cumberland
- Ceremonial county: Cumbria
- Region: North West
- Country: England
- Sovereign state: United Kingdom
- Post town: WORKINGTON
- Postcode district: CA14
- Dialling code: 01946
- Police: Cumbria
- Fire: Cumbria
- Ambulance: North West
- UK Parliament: Whitehaven and Workington

Common End is a hamlet within the civil parish of Distington in Cumbria, England. Common End was on the A595 road until it was by-passed.
