= Cookshill =

Village in Staffordshire, England

Coordinates: 52.988°N 2.083°W

- Location within Staffordshire
- OS grid reference: SJ9443
- District: Staffordshire Moorlands
- Shire county: Staffordshire
- Region: West Midlands
- Country: England
- Sovereign state: United Kingdom
- Post town: Stoke-on-Trent
- Postcode district: ST11
- Dialling code: 01782
- Police: Staffordshire
- Fire: Staffordshire
- Ambulance: West Midlands
- UK Parliament: Staffordshire Moorlands

Cookshill is a small village in the civil parish of Caverswall, Staffordshire, England, near to Weston Coyney.
