= Corney =

Village in Cumbria, England

Coordinates: 54.30°N 03.36°W

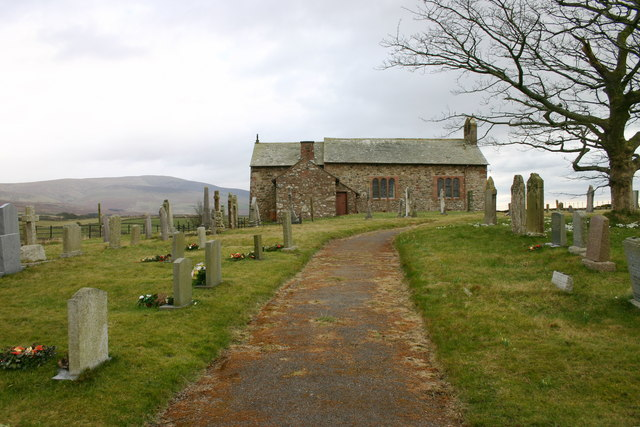
- St John's Church, Corney

- Location in Copeland Borough Location within Cumbria
- OS grid reference: SD1191
- Civil parish: Waberthwaite
- Unitary authority: Cumberland
- Ceremonial county: Cumbria
- Region: North West
- Country: England
- Sovereign state: United Kingdom
- Post town: MILLOM
- Postcode district: LA19
- Dialling code: 01229
- Police: Cumbria
- Fire: Cumbria
- Ambulance: North West
- UK Parliament: Barrow and Furness

Corney is a village and former civil parish, now in the parish of Waberthwaite, in the Cumberland district, in the ceremonial county of Cumbria, England. It is in the west of the Lake District, near the A595 road, and it is located north east of Bootle and is 10 miles north of Millom. The name is well known to travellers who take the fell road from Duddon Bridge to Ravenglass, as this route is known as the "Corney Fell Road". It is possible to see the Isle of Man, North Wales and parts of Scotland from Corney on a clear day. In 1931 the parish had a population of 185. On 1 April 1934 the parish was abolished and merged with Waberthwaite.

Corney has a predominantly agricultural community. Corney is also close to the ruins of Seaton Hall, a 12th-century Benedictine nunnery (no public access).

St John's Church dates back to as early as the 12th century and you can see Scafell Pike from the churchyard.

Corney, coincidentally, is almost exactly located at the South West Corner of The British Geological Survey, 1:50,000 Geological Sheet 38 (England and Wales). Corney is underlain by Grandiorite of the Eskdale intrusion, intruded during the Ordovician period.

== See also ==
- Listed buildings in Waberthwaite
