= Common End, Derbyshire =

Coordinates: 53.18051°N 1.34578°W

Common End
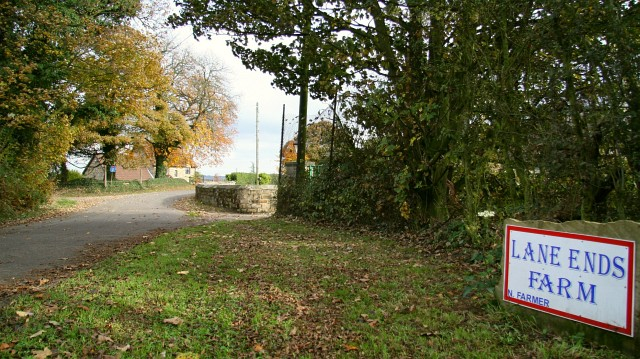
- Out Lane

- Location within Derbyshire
- OS grid reference: SK440640
- Civil parish: Ault Hucknall
- District: Bolsover
- Shire county: Derbyshire
- Region: East Midlands
- Country: England
- Sovereign state: United Kingdom
- Post town: CHESTERFIELD
- Postcode district: S44
- Police: Derbyshire
- Fire: Derbyshire
- Ambulance: East Midlands

Common End is a place noted on an Ordnance Survey map of Derbyshire, England. It is located eight miles south-east of Chesterfield, and just north of Astwith.
