= Coombs =

Coombs is an English surname. Notable people with the surname include:

- Anthony Coombs (politician) (born 1952), British politician
- Anthony Coombs (Canadian football) (born 1992), Canadian football player
- Bobby Coombs (1908–1991), American baseball player
- Claire Coombs (born 1974), British–Belgian land surveyor, married to Prince Laurent of Belgium
- Clyde Coombs (1912–1988), American psychologist
- David Coombs (born 1937), British author, historian and teacher
- David Coombs (lawyer) (born 1969), American lawyer
- Derek Coombs (1931–2014), British politician
- Doug Coombs (1957–2006), American skier and mountaineer
- Doug Coombs (geologist) (1924–2016), New Zealand geologist
- Ernie Coombs (1927–2001), Canadian/American children's entertainer
- Frank Coombs (1853–1934), American politician
- H. C. Coombs (1906–1997), Australian economist
- Jack Coombs (1882–1957), American baseball player
- James Coombs (1869–1935), American football coach
- Joe Coombs (born 1991), British canoe slalom athlete
- John Coombs (1922–2013), British racing driver and racing team owner
- Kris Coombs-Roberts, Welsh guitarist
- Mary Coombs (1929–2022), English computer programmer
- Michelle Coombs, American geologist
- Nathan Coombs (1826–1877), American founder of Napa, California
- Orde M. Coombs (1939–1984), Saint Vincent-born American writer and editor
- Pat Coombs (1926–2002), English actress
- Patricia Coombs (1926–2026), American children's author and illustrator
- Peter Coombs (1928–2020), English priest
- Robert Coombs (politician) (born 1959), Australian politician
- Robert Coombs (cricketer) (born 1959), English cricketer
- Robin Coombs (1921–2006), British immunologist
- Simon Coombs (born 1947), British politician
- Stephen Coombs (born 1960), British pianist
- Ted Coombs (born 1954), American artist, roller skater and forensic scientist
- W. H. Coombs (1816–1896), English/Australian priest

== See also ==
- Coombe (disambiguation)
- Combs (disambiguation)
- Coomes (disambiguation)
