= Combe (surname) =

Combe is a surname. It is similar to the surname Coombes. Notable people with the surname include:

- Alan Combe (born 1974), Scottish footballer
- Andrew Combe (1797–1847), Scottish physiologist
- Carmela Combe (1898–1984), Peruvian aviator
- David Combe (1943–2019), Australian political figure and wine industry executive
- George Combe (1788–1858), Scottish writer on phrenology and education
- Harvey Christian Combe (1752–1818), English brewer and Lord Mayor of London
- Ivan Combe (1911–2000), American inventor
- John Frederick Boyce Combe (1895–1967), British Army officer before and during World War II
- Martha Combe (1806–1893), British philanthropist
- Peter Combe (born 1948), Australian musician
- Reginaldus de Combe (fl. 1300–1301), English Member of Parliament
- Rose Combe (1883–1932), French writer
- Thomas Combe (1796–1872), British printer and philanthropist

== See also ==
- Combe (disambiguation)
- Coombes (surname)
- Lacombe (disambiguation)
