= Combe (disambiguation) =

A combe can refer either to a steep, narrow valley, or to a small valley or large hollow on the side of a hill.

Combe may also refer to:

== Places in England ==
- Combe, Berkshire
- Combe, Buckfastleigh, Devon
- Combe, Yealmpton, Devon
- Combe, Herefordshire
- Combe, Oxfordshire
- Combe, Somerset

== Other uses ==
- Combe (beetle), a genus of beetles in the family Cerambycidae
- Combe (business), the company that gave the world Odor Eaters, Clearasil, Lanacane
- Combe (Middle-earth), a fictional village in J. R. R. Tolkien's writings
- Combe (mythology), name of a character in Greek mythology
- "Combe" (poem), a poem by Patti Smith from her 1978 book Babel (book)
- Combe (surname)

== See also ==
- Combe Hill (disambiguation)
- Coomb (disambiguation)
- Coombe (disambiguation)
- Coombes, West Sussex, England
- Kombe (disambiguation)
