= Coombe Hill =

Coombe Hill may refer to:

== Places ==
- Coombe Hill, Buckinghamshire, England
- Coombe Hill, a different hill on the flank of Haddington Hill in Buckinghamshire, England
- Coombe Hill (Cotswolds), near Wotton-under-Edge, Gloucestershire, England
- Coombe Hill, Tewkesbury, a hamlet between Gloucester and Tewkesbury, Gloucestershire, England
  - Coombe Hill, an electoral ward in the Borough of Tewkesbury, 1983–2019
- Coombe Hill, Kingston upon Thames, London, England
  - Coombe Hill (Kingston upon Thames ward)
  - Coombe Hill Assistants' Tournament, a golf tournament
  - Coombe Hill Wood

== Other uses ==
- Coombe Hill, a cargo ship built in 1942 for Putney Hill Steamships

== See also ==
- Combe Hill (disambiguation)
- Coombe (disambiguation)
