= Coombe =

Coombe is an alternate spelling of combe, a dry valley.

It may also refer to:

== Places ==
=== Australia ===
- Coombe, South Australia, a locality in the Coorong District Council

=== England ===
- Coombe, Buckinghamshire
- Coombe, Camborne, Cornwall
- Coombe, Gwennap, Cornwall (near Redruth)
- Coombe, Kea, Cornwall (near Truro)
- Coombe, Liskeard, Cornwall
  - Coombe Junction Halt railway station
- Coombe, Morwenstow, Cornwall (near Bude)
- Coombe, St Stephen-in-Brannel, Cornwall (near St Austell)
- Coombe, East Devon, Devon (near Sidmouth)
- Coombe, Mid Devon, Devon (near Tiverton)
- Coombe, Teignmouth, Teignbridge, Devon
- Coombe, Dorset (in Whitchurch Canonicorum)
- Coombe, Gloucestershire
- Coombe, Hampshire
- Coombe, Kent
- Coombe, Croydon, London
- Coombe, Kingston upon Thames, London
- Coombe, Crewkerne, Somerset
- Coombe, Taunton, Somerset
- Coombe, Donhead St. Mary, Wiltshire
- Coombe, Enford, Wiltshire
- Coombe Bissett, Wiltshire
- Coombe Dingle, Bristol
- Combe Fields, Warwickshire
  - Coombe Abbey, former country house, now a hotel
  - Coombe Country Park, the former grounds of the house
- Coombe Hill Canal, Vale of Gloucester
- Coombe Keynes, Dorset

=== Ireland ===
- The Coombe, Dublin, a historic street in Dublin

=== United States ===
- Coombe Historic District, Felton, Kent County, Delaware

== People ==
- Dorothy Coombe (1896–1982), Australian trade unionist
- E. H. Coombe (1858–1917), South Australian newspaper editor and politician
- Robert Coombe, American chemist and educator
- Rosemary J. Coombe, Canadian anthropologist and lawyer
- Roy R. Coombe (1924-2016), American newspaper editor, businessman, and politician
- Thomas Coombe (1873–1959), Australian businessman

== Other uses ==
- Coombe Hall (1871–1932), Scottish footballer who played for Blackburn Rovers
- Coombe Cellars, a public house in south Devon, England
- Coombe Boys' School, a secondary school, New Malden, London, England
- Coombe Clipless Pedal, a type of bicycle pedal
- Coombe Dean School, a specialist secondary school in Plymouth, Devon, England
- Coombe Girls' School, an all-female secondary school in New Malden, South-West London, England
- Coombe Women's Hospital, Dublin, Ireland
- Coombe Wood, a garden in the London Borough of Croydon, England

== See also ==
- Coombs (disambiguation)
- Cwm (disambiguation)
- Combe (disambiguation)
- Combs (surname)
- Coomb (disambiguation)
- Coombes (surname)
- Coombe Hill (disambiguation)
- Coombes, West Sussex, England
