= Coombes (surname) =

Coombes is an English surname. Notable people with the surname include:

- B. L. Coombes (1893–1974), English author and coal miner
- Charly Coombes (born 1980), American-born, English multi-instrumentalist and vocalist
- Gaz Coombes (born 1976), English musician and singer-songwriter (Supergrass)
- Geoff Coombes (1919–2002), English-born, US international footballer (soccer)
- James Coombes (disambiguation), multiple people
- Lawrence Coombes (1899–1988), British-Australian aeronautical engineer and pilot
- Peet Coombes (1952–1997), British musician, guitarist and vocalist
- Richard Coombes (1858–1935), English-born journalist and 'father' of amateur athletics in Australia
- Rob Coombes (born 1972), English musician (Supergrass)
- Robert Coombes (rower) (1808–1860), English oarsman and world champion sculler
- Rod Coombes (born 1946), English singer-songwriter and musician
- William Henry Coombes (1767–1850), English Catholic priest, theologian and writer

== See also ==
- Coombes, village in Sussex, England
- Coombs (disambiguation)
- Coombe (disambiguation)
- Combes (disambiguation)
