= Cwm =

Cwm or cŵm may refer to:

- Cwm (landform), a rounded, glaciated valley, also known as a corrie or cirque
- Combe, a steep, narrow valley, or a small valley or large hollow on the side of a hill, also known as a combe
- Cwm (software), a general-purpose data processor for the semantic web
- Cwm railway station, a station in Cwm, Blaenau Gwent, Wales, 1852–1963
- Cwm Rhondda, a famous Welsh hymn tune

== Places ==
- Cwm, Blaenau Gwent, a community in Wales
- Cwm, Llanrothal, a Jesuit gathering place in Herefordshire, England
- Cwm, Denbighshire, a community in Wales
- Cwm Cadnant, a community in Anglesey, north Wales
- Cwm Gwaun, a community in northern Pembrokeshire, Wales
- Cwm Penmachno, a community in Snowdonia, north Wales
- Western Cwm, a geographical feature on Mount Everest

== Abbreviations ==
CWM may refer to:

- cwm (window manager) or Calm Window Manager, a stacking window manager for Unix systems
- Canadian War Museum, Canada's national museum of military history
- Christian Witness Ministries, a non-denominational church affiliation
- Circus World Museum, a large museum complex in Baraboo, Wisconsin
- Clark–Wilson model, a model for specifying and analyzing an integrity policy for a computing system
- ClockworkMod, open source firmware for smartphones
- Comes With Music, Nokia's digital music service
- Common Warehouse Metamodel, a data warehousing specification
- Contemporary worship music, a genre of Christian music used in contemporary worship
- Contingent Workforce Management, the strategic approach to managing an organization's contingent workforce
- Council for World Mission, a worldwide community of Christian churches

== See also ==
- Cwmbran railway station, station northeast of Cwmbran, Wales
- Pobol y Cwm (People of the Valley), long-running Welsh soap opera on S4C
- Coombe (disambiguation)
- Coomb (disambiguation)
- Combs (disambiguation)
- Cum (disambiguation)
