= Combs =

Combs may refer to:

== Places ==
=== France ===
- Combs-la-Ville, a commune in the southeastern suburbs of Paris

=== United Kingdom ===
- Combs, Derbyshire, England
- Combs, Suffolk, England

=== United States ===
- Combs, Arkansas, a community
- Combs, Kentucky, a community
- Combs Township, Carroll County, Missouri

== Other uses ==
- Comb, plural form
- Combs (surname)

== See also ==
- Comb (disambiguation)
- Combes (disambiguation)
- Justice Combs (disambiguation)
- Coombs (disambiguation)
- Cwm (disambiguation)
- Coombes
