= Right to personal identity =

Human right

The right to personal identity is recognised in international law through a range of declarations and conventions. From as early as birth, an individual's identity is formed and preserved by registration or being bestowed with a name. However, personal identity becomes more complex as an individual develops a conscience. But human rights exist to defend and protect individuality, as quoted by Law Professor Jill Marshall "Human rights law exist to ensure that individual lifestyle choices are protected from majoritarian or populist infringement." Despite the complexity of personal identity, it is preserved and encouraged through privacy, personality rights and the right to self-expression.

== Concept and history ==
The right to personal identity begins with the right to life. It is only through existing that individuals can cultivate their identity. Nevertheless, since ancient Greek philosophy, humans have been recognised with a "soul", making them more than physical bone and flesh. The Universal Declaration of Human Rights was created to preserve the biological and philosophical elements of human beings since its establishment in 1948. Therefore, the notion of individual identity and personality has been encouraged and preserved from the birth of human rights. However, throughout the years there have been developments towards the protection of personal identity through avenues that manifest identity such as private life, expression rights, personality rights and the right to know your biological origin.

== Private life ==
Article 8 of the European Court of Human Rights has been interpreted to include "personal identity" within the meaning of "private life." Article 8 protects against unwanted intrusion and provides for the respect of an individual's private space. Professor Marshall explains that this space is necessary for individuals to "think reflectively without interference" and "to be in control of one's own faculties." as Macklem puts it: "independence of mind." This protection of inner privacy allows individuals to develop and cultivate their personal identity. "Private life" has been interpreted to protect the development of relationships. The ECHR highlighted in the case of Bruggemann and Scheuten v Germany Yearbook the significance of relationships concerning the "emotional field" and "the development of one's own personality."

With respect of privacy comes respect for personal autonomy, which Article 8 has also been interpreted to protect. The ECHR Online states that the scope of Article 8 is to "embrace personal autonomy" and the freedom to make choices without the interference of the state to develop one's own personal life. As illustrated by the Stanford Encyclopaedia of Philosophy, through protecting a person's autonomy, a person's identity is also protected, as both are integral to each other.

== Expression rights ==
The Declaration of Human Rights Article 19 and Article 10 of the ECHR give everyone the right to freedom of opinion and expression. Macklem explains that "freedom of expression is not merely the freedom to communicate one's voice to others. It is more importantly the freedom to develop a distinctive voice of one's own." Therefore, Articles 19 and 10 encourage the manifestation of personal identity. In the case of Handyside v UK the court stated "Freedom of expression constitutes one of the essential foundations of such a society, one of the basic conditions for its progress and for the development of every man." Freedom of expression not only endorses individuals to participate and contribute to public life but it also gives them the opportunity to discover who they personally are.

Article 9 of the ECHR also provides the right to freedom (and the manifestation) of thought, conscience and religion. According to Locke, thought and consciousness establish personal identity, for these are the foundations of who a person is. In addition, a person's beliefs also contribute to internal and external identity. For example, some believe women who have freely chosen to wear the Islamic headscarf or full-face veil are expressing their religious beliefs and personal identity. This has led to much debate and controversy within states which have banned the wearing of full-face veils in public.

=== Full-face veils ===
As of 2011, both Belgium and France have banned the full-face Islamic veil in public places. The ban occurred under the administration of President Sarkozy, who stated that veils oppressed women and were "not welcome" in France. But Marshall highlights that the ban is disproportionate and it is not government's place to determine what women should wear especially when it misrecognises her and disrespects her identity and personality. While France explains that the intentions of the ban were to promote public order and secularism, Arslan v Turkey held that Article 9 had been violated and that France has failed to recognise the intrinsic worth of women who freely choose to wear such veils. As illustrated under Article 1 of the Declaration of Human Rights, all beings are born equal and therefore have equal worth. Finally, Amnesty International has repeatedly urged France not to impose the ban, saying it violates European human rights law.

The issue of the full-face veil ban in France and Belgium illustrates the extent of legal protection an individual has on their personal identity. Being empowered to make self-determined choices, such as freely choosing to wear a full-face veil to illustrate beliefs, Marshall believes, is an interpreted concept of human dignity and human freedom, allowing each woman's identity to be legally recognised. The enjoyment of these rights and freedoms in the ECHR are protected under Article 14, and "shall be secured without discrimination regardless of sex, race, colour, language, religion, political or other opinion, national or social origin, association with a national minority, property, birth or other status."

However, these are the opinions of only some scholars. This is a contested issue and others believe that the banning of full-face veils is about liberating females to express their sexuality and providing them the opportunity to show the world who they truly are. These aspects also promote and encourage personal identity.

=== Personality rights ===
The right to have and develop a personality is addressed in Article 22 of the UDHR: "Everyone is entitled to the realisation of the rights needed for one's dignity and the free development of their personality." Article 29 also protects the right to develop one's personality: "[e]veryone has duties to the community in which alone the free and full development of his personality is possible." Manuc explains that personality rights can be defined as those expressing the quintessence of the human person, and are intrinsic to being human. These rights recognise the "spirit" within an individual and have developed from the issues of privacy. Personality rights emerged from the German legal system in the late twentieth century to seek distance from the horrors of Nazism. It was also a mechanism to improve tort law surrounding privacy, as illustrated in the Criminal Diary case.

The case concerned the issue of personality structure and having the right to determine oneself. Ederle explained this as a right individuals have to choose how to be related in the world. Through the help of the German Constitutional Court, an individual can actively seek and create an intimate sphere so his personality can develop and be protected. Some states see no need for a specific law to personality, as their system of law possesses a different foundation for personality protection. For example, France, South Africa and England have an all-embracing law that protects an individual's interest concerning physical integrity, feelings, dignity and privacy and identity. However, in addition to substantial protection to personality through privacy, the Netherlands and Austria also recognise a general right to personality.

=== Blood and biological right ===
The UN Convention on the Rights of the Child stresses the value and importance of a child's identity. Giroux and De Lorenzi separate the understanding of identity into two parts: static and dynamic. The static aspects of identity concern attributes that make one visible to the outside world, for example, physical features, sex, name, genetics, and nationality. Dynamic aspects include morals and religious and cultural characteristics. Under Article 7, a child has a right to have a "legal" identity by being registered, and has a right to a name and a nationality. These protect mainly the static aspects of identity. However, Article 8 protects and encourages the child's dynamic aspects of identity through preserving his or her identity in relation to nationality, name and family relations. Article 8 illustrates the state's duty to protect this right, both passively and actively.

Articles 7 and 8 developed to confront the issues of children in political struggles and disappearances. For example, Gelman v Uruguay concerned the kidnapping of Maria Gelman which prevented her from developing relationships with her parents and concealing her true identity from her. 193 states have ratified the convention, making it the most-ratified convention in history, including all United Nation members except the United States, Somalia and South Sudan.

Identity is also within people's genes as evidenced by debates concerning anonymity for gamete donation. Since 2005, in the UK, donor-received people can contact their donor once over 18 to find out where they have come from and prevent genealogical bewilderment. However, there are global differences towards the debate; for example, in Canada and the United States there are no regulations, whereas in Switzerland the donor must be willing to be identified, and in France, anonymity is forced.

=== Criticisms ===
There are some scholars who believe the right to identity must be treated with caution. Rosemary J. Coombe expressed her concerns of personal identity becoming property as there is the belief that through marginalising identity, it could be accepted as private and exclusive property. Lionel Bently is also concerned with this idea and highlights his worry through a quote from the Du Boulay case: "Property rights in 'identity'… have the potential to curtail the liberties of those who wish to build their own identities, in whatever way, and for whatever reason." Other scholars believe that enshrining personal identity into the law is restricting people's choices and flexibility to transform and change who they are. However, human rights can also perform the contrary and protect individuals' choices on personal identity. While developing personal identity comes down to the individual to manifest character and work out 'who they are,' Marshall highlights that jurisprudence has evolved to create a positive obligation on states to provide social conditions such as private and personality rights to be respected, demonstrating that the international audience acknowledges that legal recognition is necessary to allow individuals to choose how they want to live and who they are.

== See also ==
- Anti-discrimination law
- Artistic freedom
- Beard and haircut laws by country
- Bodily integrity
- Clothing laws by country
- Cognitive liberty
- Freedom of expression
- Freedom of speech
- Freedom of thought
- Gender identity
- Gender self-identification
- Legal recognition of non-binary gender
- Legal status of transgender people
- LGBTQ rights by country or territory
- Right to protest
- Security of person
- Transgender inequality
