= Küt börek =

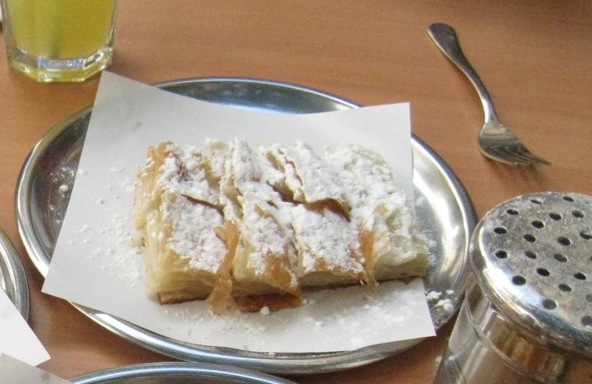
Kurdish pastry example.

Küt börek küt pastry or plain pastry, is a type of unfilled börek derived from oily kömbe, usually made and sold in pastry shops. It is prepared with flour, butter, and vegetable oil, and is typically sprinkled with powdered sugar.

The person who created and popularized this böreks is Billiceli Mehmet Efendi. Known by the nickname “Rengo,” he originally prepared oily kömbes to sell to Kurdish workers employed on ships and sand barges in Kasımpaşa; these were later called “küt börek.” Serving the börek with powdered sugar was a later development. The most famous place where this börek is sold is Karaköy, Istanbul.

== Controversies ==
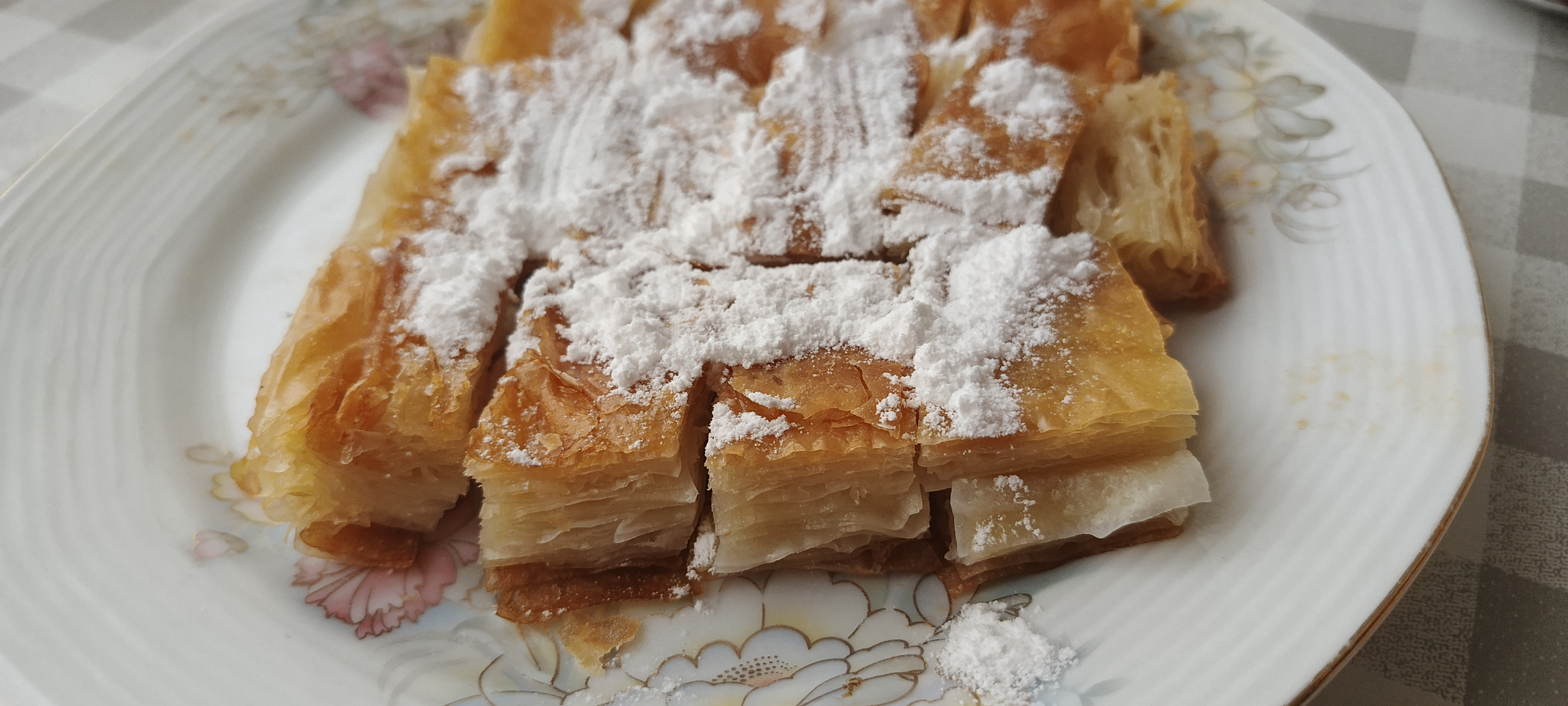
Another Kurdish pastry example.

The name of the pastry has become a subject of debate in recent years. Similar to Bosnian börek introduced to Turkey by Balkan immigrants, masters of Kurdish origin also played a role in the promotion and development of this pastry over time. However, in the 1960s, the sale of this pastry under the name “Kurdish pastry” by bakers and street vendors in Istanbul was banned and penalized. The governor of Istanbul at the time, Niyazi Akı, changed the name of the pastry to “ram pastry,” arguing that the original name was discriminatory.

Despite this, it continued to be written and referred to as “Kurdish pastry” in written works of the period. During the period following the September 12 coup, it was sold as “plain pastry” due to the ban on the word “Kurdish.” Later, it began to be sold again as “Kurdish pastry.” Although it had not appeared in any written sources before, after the 2000s it was claimed that the name “küt pastry” derived from the “küt-küt” sound made while cutting the pastry. This naming appeared in cookbooks after 2017.
