= Combs (surname) =

Combs is a surname. Notable people with the surname include:

== Art and entertainment ==
- Holly Marie Combs (born 1973), American actress
- Jeffrey Combs (born 1954), American character actor
- King Combs (born 1998), American rapper and model, son of Sean Combs
- Luke Combs (born 1990), American country music singer and songwriter
- Ray Combs (1956–1996), American television game show host and stand-up comedian
- Sean Combs (born 1969), American record producer, CEO, clothing designer, actor, and rapper known as Diddy

== Politics and government ==
- Bert Combs (1911–1991), American politician from Kentucky
- Everett R. Combs (1876–1957), American politician from Virginia
- Jeanne Combs (born 1955), American politician from Nebraska
- Lois Combs Weinberg (born 1943), American politician from Kentucky, daughter of Bert Combs
- Sara Walter Combs (born 1948), American judge from Kentucky, widow of Bert Combs
- Thomas A. Combs (1868–1935), American politician from Kentucky

== Sports ==
- Beth Combs (born 1969), American basketball coach
- Branson Combs (born 2000), American football player
- Chris Combs (defensive lineman) (born 1976), American football player
- Chris Combs (tight end) (born 1958), American football player
- Cora Combs (1927–2015), American professional wrestler
- Don Combs (1938/1939–2025), American Thoroughbred racehorse trainer
- Earle Combs (1899–1976), American center fielder and Baseball Hall of Fame member
- Frederick Combs (1935–1992), American actor
- Glen Combs (born 1946), American basketball player
- Jeremy Combs (born 1995), American basketball player for Israeli team Hapoel Ramat Gan Givatayim
- Jessi Combs (1983–2019), American race driver and actress
- Merl Combs (1919–1981), a shortstop in Major League Baseball from 1947 to 1952
- Pat Combs (born 1966), a Philadelphia Phillies pitcher from 1989 to 1992
- Rodney Combs (born 1950), American NASCAR driver

== Other ==
- Allan Combs (1942–2025), consciousness researcher and neuropsychologist
- Lewis Combs (1895–1996), United States Admiral

== See also ==
- Coombs (disambiguation)
- Coombe (disambiguation)
