= Judy Fierstein =

American geologist

Fierstein in 2019 in the Sierra Nevada

Judith Ellen Fierstein is research geologist employed by the U.S. Geological Survey (USGS) at the California Volcano Observatory. Fierstein has published widely on volcanism in Chile and the U.S. state of Alaska, among other regions, including the eruptive histories of Laguna del Maule in the Chilean Andes and Novarupta in Katmai National Park. She is a fellow of the Geological Society of America (GSA), and, alongside research partner Wes Hildreth, won the organization's Florence Bascom Award in 2019.

== Education and career ==
Judith Ellen Fierstein attended the University of California, Santa Cruz, from which she received a Bachelor of Science degree in 1980 and a Master of Science degree in 1989.

Fierstein first began working for the U.S. Geological Survey in 1980, after attaining her undergraduate degree. She was hired as a summer field assistant to Wes Hildreth for his planned geologic mapping of Mount Adams in the Cascade Range of Washington, but ashfall from the 1980 eruption of Mount St. Helens left their target inaccessible. Instead, the duo backpacked in the Valley of Ten Thousand Smokes within Katmai National Park & Preserve, Alaska, to conduct fieldwork and map Novarupta and surrounding volcanoes. From then until his death in 2025, Hildreth was a mentor to Fierstein and her most prolific research partner.

In a 2023 series of articles in Discover magazine, Fierstein was named as an influential figure among women in volcanology. She has mentored other successful women volcanologists; for example, Michelle Coombs, former scientist-in-charge of the Alaska Volcano Observatory, was a field assistant to Fierstein while in college. Coombs was also mentored by Terry Keith, one of Fierstein's collaborators on research in Alaska.

Fierstein is currently a research geologist at the California Volcano Observatory in Menlo Park, California, which monitors volcanoes in California and Nevada, including the Lassen Volcanic Center, Long Valley Caldera, and Mount Shasta.

== Research ==
Fierstein is best known for her work in volcanology and geologic mapping, and has been described as an engaging orator for her ability to present her research to the public. She formerly served as an associate editor of the Bulletin of Volcanology, and has also reviewed manuscripts for the journal Geology.

Among Fierstein's studies of tephra is the 1992 article "Another look at the calculation of fallout tephra volumes" in the Bulletin of Volcanology, which provides a method for calculating the volumes of tephra deposits. Coauthored with Manuel Nathenson, the paper was later referenced in publicly-presented USGS event.

=== Alaska ===
Following her 1980 graduation from UC Santa Cruz, Fierstein experienced her first-ever backpacking trip while working as a field assistant to Wes Hildreth as they conducted research in Katmai National Park & Preserve. This was her first time in the park, but she continued to publish articles on its geologic features, including the Valley of Ten Thousand Smokes and the volcano Novarupta. For example, in 1984, the Alaska Historical Society published an article by Fierstein on the Valley of Ten Thousand Smokes; it was later cited in a symposium on the effects of natural hazards on communities in Alaska. Fierstein continued to research the region and coauthor publications with Hildreth on its volcanic history.

A 278-page report by Hildreth and Fierstein about Novarupta's 1912 eruption was published by the USGS in 2012, the eruption's centennial year. The centennial garnered nationwide media coverage, and she presented about the occasion at community events, and to Alaska Public Media. For her contributions to the geologic understanding of Katmai, she has been called a "Novarupta-Katmai expert" by the USGS, an "expert on the 1912 eruption [of Novarupta]" by the Alaska Volcano Observatory, and a "Katmai expert" by the University of Alaska Fairbanks.

Fierstein's research in Katmai has also uncovered errors in the research of Clarence N. Fenner and Robert F. Griggs, such as the assumption that Mount Katmai was the vent for the 1912 eruption. Fierstein's work has also been applied alongside the research of Bernard R. Hubbard for determining the eruptive history of Aniakchak Caldera. Copies of an article by Fierstein were found in the files of Hubbard after his death.

=== California ===
Fierstein has contributed to geologic research in both Death Valley and the Mono Basin of California. "Eruptive history of Mammoth Mountain and its mafic periphery, California", a 2016 USGS professional paper by Hildreth and Fierstein, was adapted by the USGS alongside another publication to create a "geonarrative" of volcanic landscapes in the western United States. Fierstein has studied the stratigraphy of eruption deposits at Ubehebe Craters, Death Valley, in order to understand the size of past eruptions and how their deposits traveled over the landscape. In 2020, Fierstein and two coauthors, Greg Valentine from the University at Buffalo and James White of the University of Otago, published the work from their project on past eruptions at Ubehebe Crater.

In 2016, Fierstein and Hildreth led an interpretive talk and hike at Devils Postpile National Monument. Additionally, in 2022, Fierstein was an advisor to a USGS Mendenhall Program research opportunity on volcanic hazards in the Mono Basin.

=== Chile ===
Fierstein's research in the Andes of South America, including studies at Laguna del Maule, led to the first ever tri-national hazards map, which was a collaboration between the USGS, the Servicio Geológico Minero of Argentina, and the Servicio Nacional de Geología y Minería of Chile. Her maps and tephra stratigraphy studies have also been used to fill in the known eruptive history of the volcano.

=== Other regions ===
Fierstein has researched volcanoes of the Cascade Range in both Washington and Oregon. Fierstein and Hildreth were the first to research the stratigraphic structures making up Mount Adams in Washington and monitor the geologic changes at the mountain. They published a conference paper containing their geologic maps and geothermal energy assessment of Mount Adams in 1990, and went on to publish the geologic map as a USGS IMAP in 1995. She has also studied the Three Sisters of Oregon and taken rock samples there, and has collaborated with Hildreth and others to create a geologic map of the associated volcanic cluster.

Fierstein has also worked with geologist Dave Tucker, former director of the Mount Baker Volcano Research Center, on research in the North Cascades. Tucker assisted with collecting samples for Hildreth and Fierstein at Mount Baker throughout the 1990s for a 2003 publication on the volcano's eruptive history. Fierstein's works with Hildreth and Tucker have also been applied to the documentation of volcanic and seismic hazards in western Washington.

== Awards ==
Fierstein is a fellow of the Geological Society of America. She was nominated by Charles R. Bacon, and elected to the society in 2007. In 2014, Fierstein, in collaboration with Wes Hildreth, won the Outstanding Publication award from the Association of Earth Science Editors. Also along with Hildreth, Fierstein won the 2019 Florence Bascom Geologic Mapping Award (named for Florence Bascom) from the GSA. They were nominated for the award by Colin Wilson (an Alaska research collaborator) in recognition of their volcanic mapping efforts in regions worldwide.

== Personal life ==
As of 2019, Fierstein has a husband named Rich as well as two children, both of whom join her on expeditions.
