= Transgender inequality =

Social problem

Transgender inequality is the unequal protection received by transgender people in work, school, and society in general. Transgender people regularly face transphobic harassment and violence. Ultimately, one of the largest reasons that transgender people face inequality is due to a lack of public understanding of transgender people.

Anti-transgender stigma leads to employment discrimination, exclusion from healthcare, and increased risks of poverty and homelessness, which in turn correspond to greater risks of fatal violence. Abuse and murder of transgender people is pervasive; in November 2021, "2021 was the deadliest year...of anti-transgender violence in the United States." Those who have died as a result of transphobia are commonly remembered on Transgender Day of Remembrance.

== Transgender and transgender inequality definitions ==
=== Common misconceptions ===
A common misconception is that a transgender person is therefore gay. However, being transgender focuses on gender identity and not sexual orientation. A transgender person may identify with any sexual orientation. Another important misconception is that individuals who crossdress are transgender. However, many crossdressers are comfortable with their assigned sex at birth. Even though individuals who participate in crossdressing are officially under the Transgender Umbrella, most do not identify as transgender.

The status of transgender identity as a mental disorder is widely disputed. Many transgender people experience gender dysphoria, which is a disconnect between one's assigned gender at birth and the gender which the individual identifies with.

== Transgender inequality in society ==
Several recent studies from Trans Equality have shown that transgender individuals face discrimination within their own family units and schools, in employment and housing, within government settings, through hate crimes, and under the justice and legal systems. From a young age, children are often brought up in heteronormative settings within their own homes and in school. Parents oftentimes respond quite negatively when their children cross gender barriers, prompting transgender youth to run away. As a result, homeless transgender youth are more likely to turn to drug dealing, car theft, and sexual exploitation. According to the Human Rights Campaign, less than 43% of gender-expansive youth said they could turn to an adult in their family if they were worried or sad. In education, transgender individuals also describe discrimination from peers. Transgender youth are three times more likely to be excluded by peers because they are "different." A survey of National Center of Transgender Equality states, "Those who expressed a transgender identity or gender non-conformity while in grades K-12 reported alarming rates of harassment (78%), physical assault (35%) and sexual violence (12%); harassment was so severe that it led almost one-sixth (15%) to leave a school in K-12 settings or in higher education."

Transgender individuals also face discrimination in employment and housing and within government settings. Transgender individuals face double the unemployment, and 90% of those employed face discrimination within their own jobs. The 1994 Employment Non-Discrimination Act does not protect transgender individuals from employment discrimination. Essentially 26% of transgender individuals had lost a job because of their transgender or non-conforming gender status. The NCTE states, "Respondents who had lost a job due to bias also experienced ruinous consequences such as four times the rate of homelessness." Transgender individuals are also oftentimes discriminated within government settings through healthcare policies and government-issued IDs. Healthcare policies do not recognize transgender identities as a physical disability. Rather, it is oftentimes characterized as a mental disability, providing transgender individuals with insufficient care: Healthcare policies do not address the pre- and post-operative needs of those individuals who elect to go through sex-change operations. In addition, transgender individuals are disproportionately affected by HIV-AIDS and are more likely to do drugs or alcohol. Although transgender individuals are more at risk health-wise, 19% of the respondents have described being refused medical care and 50% described their medical care was postponed because of their gender status. Transgender individuals also face discrimination when it comes to government-issued IDs. Only one-fifth of the respondents stated that they were able to update all their identification documents. 41% of the respondents live without a driver's license that matches their gender identity.

Transgender individuals are disproportionately affected by hate crimes, and some could argue the current justice and legal system are not equipped to manage such crimes. Transgender individuals are at risk for hate crime, yet transgender individuals are less likely to report transphobic violence because of their distrust for the police. According to the NCTE, "One-fifth (22%) of respondents who have interacted with police, reported harassment by police, with much higher rates reported by people of color." Overall, transgender individuals face discrimination by government agencies. NCTE also reports, "One fifth (22%) were denied equal treatment by a government agency or official; 29% reported police harassment or disrespect; and 12% had been denied equal treatment or harassed by judges or court officials."

High levels of stress have been caused by exclusion, discrimination, and lack of validation, and barriers to accessing healthcare have been created by social stigma and economic inequality, resulting in adverse mental health effects.

=== Timeline ===
Transgender, while a fairly new term, does not describe a new phenomenon. In North America, many Native American cultures had identifications for transgender people, being people whose gender identity does not match up with their biological sex. Sabine Lang, in her research, defines non-binary people as women-men and men-women (the first referring to the expression and the second referring to the biological sex), and discusses how different Native American tribes had designations for this and had transgender people integrated and integral to society. From the Navajo to the Shoshoni to the Pueblo de Zuni, there were different definitions and characterizations of what we now know to be transgender people. The Navajo described both men and women who did not identify as their birth sex as being "nádleehé, 'someone who is in a constant process of change," while the Shoshoni entitled it "tianna wa'ippi," which is a combination of the word for man and the word for women, which was used interchangeably for both the biologically male and female. For those who were men-women or women-men, it was considered to be a spiritual journey if one was to renounce their born gender and assume the other. According to Lang, unlike in current United States culture, these third-gender designations were not seen as deviant, or strange. Lang further highlights how many tribes considered relationships heterosexual as long as the gender identity lined up as so: in this case, the gender identity was what indicated heterosexual relationships, rather than biological sex. However, in tribes such as the Navajo and Shoshoni, Lang discusses how it would be seen as "unthinkable" and borderline "incestuous," respectively, for two transgender people to be in a sexual relationship. While transgender people in Native American cultures were largely accepted, Lang discusses that when Europeans came over and colonized, they brought with them oppressive ideas on gender non-conformists, and began to influence Native cultures to do the same.

Some Native American tribes had third gender roles including transgender people. When French people colonized the Americas, they deemed gender-nonconforming people "berdaches," often a term for a man who takes a receptive role in homosexual intercourse. for a man trying to pass as a woman, or "passing women," a term for those assigned female at birth who took masculine roles and possibly masculine clothing.

Transgender people have been facing inequality and discrimination since before the 1800s. Much inequality has stemmed from the terms used to refer to transgender people.

Legal measures against non-binary people began to be implemented in the mid-nineteenth century. Laws began to prohibit and make it illegal for anyone to dress in a manner opposed to their biological sex. The current legal institutions that exist today similarly act in a way that discriminates against transgender people, according to Susan Stryker. She illustrates how there exists a lack of accountability to those aggressors who victimize the transgender community, and there is a lack of legal possibility to prosecute aggressions against transgender people or to give adequate rights to transgender people. Transgender people, not fitting entirely into the binary of "male" or "female," are not covered by Sex Discrimination laws. Stryker argues that this means that they are largely unprotected when they are attacked in one way or another for being transgender, and it further alienates them from our definition of humanity, making them an "other," unrecognized by lawful protections and only seen as outsiders or deviants. The Americans with Disabilities Act of 1990 does not include transgender as a "physical impairment," and excludes them explicitly alongside arsonists and molesters.

While there are sometimes state, city, or county laws that protect the transgender community, federal laws largely overlook them. Even though President Obama passed the Employment Non-Discrimination Act of 2009, this does not serve to remedy the many issues of the justice system in its unjust treatment transgender people. Judges are still able to exercise personal bias in many rulings that strongly effect transgender people, and it can greatly disenfranchise them within the United States.

One thing that has been used by some to gain rights is the designation of transgender as a psychological disorder, known as Gender Identity Disorder. A young girl called Pat Doe, advocating for her own right to wear clothing that matched with her gender identity, was able to gain a favorable outcome in court by using GID to better articulate her argument. While some in the transgender community are critical of labeling themselves as having a psychological disorder, others like Doe have used it to gain what others can't otherwise on a legal level. Some continue to say that it is harmful as it continues to other transgender people, as well as its requirement of "significant distress". Johnson points out that it excludes those people who are comfortable with their gender identity, and thus does not protect them in legal matters when this otherwise could be used in order to gain legal recognition. This psychological designation also creates a paradox, which would prohibit the steps for remedying this disorder (living as the gender identity of choice, getting hormone treatment, and then surgery). Stephen Whittle wrote the following description in his own work: "if you are distressed enough to qualify for surgery, your mental reasoning has been impaired to the point where you probably cannot give informed consent. But if you are not that distressed, you will not be offered the surgery to which you are able to consent".

The term transvestite originated in 1910 from the German sexologist Magnus Hirschfeld. At that time, it was used in a similar fashion to transsexual, a word that was not coined until the late 1940s. The term transgender was first used in 1971.

The first public trials for transvestite behavior involved Ernest Boulton (Stella) and Fred Park (Fanny). Both were arrested in 1870 for indecent behavior, as a result of dressing in clothing of the opposite sex.

The first modern sex reassignment surgery was performed by Dr Felix Abraham: a mastectomy on a trans man in 1926.

In the 1940s and 50s, sexuality studies conducted by Karl Bowman of the Langley Porter Psychiatric Clinic at the University of California San Francisco, sexologist Alfred Kinsey and sexologist and endocrinologist Harry Benjamin argued unsuccessfully for the protection of access to gender-affirming surgeries in California courts.

The 1966 case of Anonymous v. Weiner dealt with a transsexual person who had undergone a sex reassignment surgery and wanted to change the name and sex on the birth certificate. The court ruled against allowing a transgender person to change their original sex cited on their birth certificate to match the reassigned gender. It ruled that the only time the sex on a birth certificate could be changed was when an error had been made when recording it at birth.

Over the last decade, more than one person per month has died due to transgender-based hate or prejudice.

Transgender people who are going through divorce, inheritance battles or custody disputes are vulnerable to legal challenges. This is because the validity of their marriages is often called into question due to inconsistent laws regulating transgender equality.

An inconsistency in the US is that some states recognize a transgender person's gender transition, while other states do not. Laws vary from state to state concerning the requirements for changing the gender on birth certificates and other identity documents. Laws also vary concerning whether a state will accept such identity documents as conclusive with respect to one's gender identity.

In August 2013, Gov. Jerry Brown passed a bill allowing transgender students in California public schools to participate in sex-segregated programs and use gender separate facilities, such as restrooms, according to their self-perceived gender.

=== At work ===
Transgender workers can have a difficult time coping with the traditional workplace due to established gender norms that limit the roles perceived and expected of them. Among fellow employees, potential teasing and/or discrimination can arise further affecting the emotional state of transgender workers. Employers at times retract job offers and opportunities because of discrimination towards workers of varying gender identities.

In 2012, former police detective and veteran Mia Macy was denied a ballistics technician position at the federal ATF laboratory because of her transgender identity. After the matter was raised with the US Equal Employment Opportunity Commission, it was decided that transgender people are protected from employee and employer discrimination through the Civil Rights Act. The event led her family house to foreclosure, but she was grateful for the final ruling.

Furthermore, in law regarding to transgender discrimination in the workplace, the US Senate on 7 November 2013 gave final approval passing legislation actively outlawing private or public sector justification related to promotions, payment and hiring based on sexual orientation or gender identity. This is to recognize a more fair field in the workplace, noting credibility and achievements without being swayed by factors that not only fail to create direct relations to those aspects, but also ones that are vulnerable to prejudice from employees, employers and associates.

However, despite pay-related legislation being in place in the US, transgender people are still considerably underpaid as opposed to cisgender people. On average transgender people are three times as likely to be unemployed, and even if they are then employed across America, transgender people receive less money than cisgender people.

The US Selective Service System, as of 2018, refuses to allow or recognize the validity of male to female sex change. Consequently, "U.S. citizens or immigrants who are born male and changed their gender to female are still required to register."

=== In school ===
Those who identify as transgender at an early age may have troubles when their identity conflicts with judgment from traditional school protocol, whether public or private. Discrimination may come from classmates who tease or physically harm transgender people as a result of transphobia. Because of incidents such as these, the Transgender Day of Remembrance was created to respect and keep in memory gender non-conformists who have been killed through acts of prejudice. This annual event held on 20 November is acknowledged internationally in schools, neighborhoods, and churches. Mental and physical strain through varying forms of assault by their peers is an unfortunate effect on openly transgender students.

In 2011, Domaine Javier, a transgender woman and honor student, was expelled from California Baptist University after coming out as transgender in an MTV documentary. The university cited a violation of its "student conduct" policies, stating that she had committed "fraud" by identifying as female on her application. Javier's expulsion drew national media attention and criticism from LGBTQ+ advocacy organizations, highlighting ongoing challenges faced by transgender students in faith-based or conservative academic institutions. She later filed a lawsuit against the university, and the case became a prominent example of how institutional policies can affect access to education for transgender individuals.

Even school staff are included in academia-related parties that prefer repressing public displays of transgender action. For example, in November 2013, Jeydon Loredo was temporarily excluded from the La Feria Independent School District yearbook in Texas due to sporting a tuxedo that did not meet "community standards." It was not until Loredo, along with his mother, took the case to the Human Rights Campaign, a group that stands for the rights of gay, bisexual and transgender citizens, that the school district reversed its decision, allowing Loredo to wear his tuxedo for the yearly photograph and have it published in their high school yearbook pictures.

Those who expressed a transgender identity or gender non-conformity while in grades K-12 reported high rates of harassment (78%), physical assault (35%) and sexual violence (12%); harassment was so severe that it led almost one-sixth (15%) to leave a school in K-12 settings or in higher education.

=== In college ===
The needs of college students who identify on the transgender spectrum has been largely explored within the last few years; however, this information has been almost entirely limited to four-year colleges and universities.

Much of the scrutiny and discrimination that transgender people face in college can be attributed with having to choose what gender binary they are going to publicly identify with within the public eye. One major example of this is deciding what bathroom to use in public. Transgender individuals are faced with deciding whether to use a bathroom that coincides with their gender identity or a bathroom that coincides with the sex they were assigned with at birth. When groups are sex-segregated, such as in some university dormitories, transgender people must decide or be forced into a group they no longer identify with, which can negatively impact the transgender person psychologically.

One study, followed 34 transgender-spectrum community college students among 164 LGBT students as well as 3,247 college students from other schools. From the pool of 34 transgender-spectrum students, 13 reported experiencing offensive or exclusionary behavior, 19 feared for their physical safety at times because of their sexual identity with 6 fearing for their safety three or more times. Because of these instances 10 students seriously considered leaving their schools and one reported that they were transferring colleges because of the hostile environment. One participant stated he "had hell on wheels being a gender variant student in the [community college] system, [as] there are no protections here and issues are dealt with quite poorly".

Transgender people face inequality when applying to schools. A transgender person applied to Smith College and was rejected because her home state still identified her as male. The application fee was returned with a letter stating, "Smith is a women's college, which means that undergraduate applicants to Smith must be female at the time of admission."

In 2013, the University of North Carolina school system voted to ban any gender-neutral housing at its campuses. A February 2014 Washington Post article noted that nearly 150 US schools have gender-neutral housing programs.

Campus events and activities are a major component of making any college student feel involved and connected with their community and fellow students. The more a student is involved with campus and community events, the better a student fares not only socially, but also academically. Colleges can increase campus awareness by hosting transgender awareness events which can help by making transgender students feel understood as well as to educate the general student population on transgender issues. Support services formed by LGBT communities oftentimes do not properly cater towards transgender-specific issues and thus transgender people will often come together on campuses to create their own support group.

Campus housing also presents itself with a predicament as most colleges will assign either male or female or "coed" housing to first and second year students. Transgender students are most commonly assigned to housing on a case-by-case basis. Colleges like the University of Minnesota and Twin Cities have developed policies which promise to find comfortable housing to any known transgender students. Many colleges are changing student intake forms to account for other genders than male or female.

"Some of the most dangerous places on many campuses for transgender students are restrooms and locker rooms designated for "women" and "men." Anecdotal and research evidence suggest that transgender people often face verbal and physical assault and risk being questioned or even arrested by the police when they use gender-specific facilities (Coalition for Queer Action, 2001; San Francisco Human Rights Commission, 2001)." "Whether through cross-dressing, transitioning from one gender to another, or blending in traditionally female and male elements, transgender students violate society's expectation that someone is either female or male, which makes them vulnerable to harassment and violence"

== Transgender inequality for people of color ==
Many believe that transgender individuals of color face additional financial, social, and interpersonal challenges as a result of structural racism in comparison to the transgender community as a whole, however many cite a lack of evidence to this belief. According to the National Transgender Discrimination Survey, the combination of anti-transgender bias with structural and individual racism means that transgender people of color experience particularly high levels of discrimination. Specifically, black transgender people reported the highest level of discrimination among all transgender individuals of color. Studies on the transgender community are extremely rare, and even fewer studies have been conducted on the experiences of transgender individuals of color. However, some literature has documented the experiences of certain minority groups and the unique challenges they face in everyday life. The majority of the discussion in this section is based on findings from the National Transgender Discrimination Survey, due to the extreme rarity of data available on this subject.

=== Theories ===
Studies of the experiences of transgender people of color are often based on the theories of intersectionality and privilege. Intersectional approaches argue that the overlapping racial and gender identities of transgender people of color results in them experiencing even more oppression and discrimination. Therefore, transgender advocacy should give special attention to non-white individuals. In this context, the theory of privilege asserts that both white transgender individuals and cisgender people of color receive certain benefits because of their skin color or gender identity, while those who are both non-white and non-heterosexual are deprived of these benefits and face additional oppression. For example, according to a report by National LGBTQ Task Force, Asian transgender individuals were more likely than their cisgender counterparts to report experiencing racism within the LGBT community. This aligns with matrix of domination theory, which argues that sociological factors such as race and gender overlap and increase the degree of discrimination experienced by minority individuals.

Addressing the overlapping racial and gender discrimination facing transgender individuals of color has raised a lot of debate both among scholars and the public. One advocated approach is to work within the existing binary sex classification system and grant legal rights to transgender individuals based on their self-defined gender identity. Another approach argues that transgender people would be better served if the existing binary sex classifications were dismantled. Similarly, race scholars disagree about whether embracing existing race classifications helps or harms minorities. Much of the disagreement lies in the question of how racial and gender identities are formed. The essentialism, or nature, views states that these identities are fixed and inherent from birth, while the social constructionism, or nurture, views sees them as flexible and dependent on one's environment.

=== Inequality in employment and socioeconomic status ===
Some transgender people face disadvantages in the workplace, although black transgender people are among the most disadvantaged. 32% of black transgender individuals report losing their job due to bias, compared to 26% of Latino transgender people, 24% of white transgender people and 21% of Asian-Pacific American transgender people. In addition, the unemployment rate for transgender individuals of minority races is especially high, with blacks, American Indians, and Latinos experiencing four times higher the unemployment rate of the general population. Such individuals are also more likely to live in poverty, with 34% of blacks and 28% of Latinos living on less than $10,000 a year.

=== Inequality in health ===
Transgender people also risk discrimination, harassment, and victimization in health care settings. More than a fourth of transgender people have encountered segregation by a doctor or have been denied enlistment in a medical coverage because of their gender identity. Different studies found that they are less likely than the overall public to have medical coverage, and for those with protection, numerous transgender-related health needs are not protected. In a study done in Chicago, 14% reported difficulty getting emergency health care because they were transgender. A San Francisco investigation of 515 transgender individuals found that 62% had experienced segregation in business, lodging, or health services.

The research conducted represents one of the first major attempts to understand the behavior of transgender adults in many different areas; focusing primarily on health and access to health services. This research is deemed important to members of the scientific community because many transgender people struggle with a fear of seeking medical care, victimization, and internal stigmas. With each new contemporary study, the understanding of transgender inequality in medical settings is refined. In one study, roughly 42% of transgender adults reported both verbal and physical harassment as well as denial of fair and equal treatment at a doctor's office or hospital. Though studies focusing on the treatment of transgender individuals in medical settings are rare, published research presents worse-than-average treatment compared to cisgender peers. Supporters of improved healthcare equality endorse community outreach in diverse groups to decrease occurrences of health inequality and discrimination.

Transgender individuals of color encounter more physical and mental health issues than transgender whites and their heterosexual counterparts. The HIV infection rate for transgender individuals overall is 2.6%, two percent over the national average. Within this group, 25% of blacks, 11% of Latinos, and 7% of American Indians report being HIV positive. A 2007 analysis of Medicaid policies found that exclusions on transition-related health expenses, such as hormone therapy and sex change surgeries, have a disproportionately large effect on low-income transgender people of color, leading to increased violence, political disenfranchisement, and poor health outcomes.

In addition, due to the rampant institutional and interpersonal discriminatory practices against transgender individuals of color, they often suffer mental health consequences from social and economic inequalities. Because transgender people of color face double discrimination for their racial and gender identities, they are more likely to be denied jobs and fall into poverty, leaving them to careers of prostitution or other illegal dealings. These structural issues can often lead to increased encounters with the criminal justice system as well as emotional difficulties. Suicidal ideation is especially common among transgender people who belong to racial minorities: 49% of blacks and 47% of Latinos report attempting suicide, compared to 41% of transgender individuals of all races.

=== Violence and the criminal justice system ===
A 2013 report by the National Coalition of Anti-Violence Programs found that members of racial minority groups who also identified as transgender were more likely to experience harassment and hate-motivated violence. Specifically, transgender people of color were 1.5 times more likely to experience threats and intimidation, and 1.5 times more likely to experience sexual assault, than white cisgender individuals. They were also 6 times more likely to face police violence. In a study that cross analyzed reports of sexual assault and violence against transgender people, Rebecca Stotzer found that these attacks are believed to start as early as age 12, and one study found that the median age for first rapes of transgender individuals of color occurred at age 14 and 15. In fact, one of the studies that Stotzer quoted, conducted by Shannon Wyss, found that transgender high school students had to deal with "full-contact hallways", which respondents in the study described as places where they were pushed, kicked, hit, and even held down and beat up by a group of people. Stotzer's cross analysis covered 1,896 respondents from across the country and found that acts of violence happen across a lifetime for transgender individuals, with multiple acts of violence or intolerance happening on a daily basis. In contrast to white transgender hate crime victims, transgender victims from racial minorities are more likely to identify their race as contributing to the assault, and many perceived violence to stem from negatively representing their racial communities.

== Transgender people and unequal treatment in the LGBT community ==
Beginning in the 1990s, lesbian and gay activist organizations added transgender people to their cause because at that time transgender people faced many of the same prejudices. During this time the gay and lesbian community frequently referred to their organizations as defending the interests of and "serving the needs of all gay Americans". Due to this description many Americans associated the term transgender with being gay. Some members of the LGBT community are uncomfortable with transgender individuals and their issues. In Kristen Schilt's Just One of the Guys: Transgender Men and the Persistence of Gender Inequality?, she interviews transgender men who have encountered tokenism while working in LGBT organizations. In other words, because LGBT communities include the "T", they need a transgender representative as part of the organization. Schilt says that many transgender people encountered being the only one responsible for knowing anything about being transgender. When anyone within the LGBT organizations had questions about transgender issues they were always referred to the token transgender representative. The unequal treatment of transgender individuals may be because not all transgender individuals are gay. Schilt also concluded that some gay transgender people were treated poorly by cisgender gay individuals because they were thought to have made the choice to be gay. Therefore, the gay community's display of transphobia and heterosexism creates inequality.

According to Tyler Curry, the senior editor of HIV Equal Online and an award-winning LGBT columnist, "As we continue to progress in the fight for equal rights, it has become apparent that the "T" in LGBT is being neglected as gay men and women continue to take precedence. By being part of the same-sex acronym, trans individuals are rarely recognized as a unique group that requires its own specific agenda to obtain equality. Instead, they are often considered an obscure and misunderstood subgroup of the gay community." Many individuals in the LBG community do not identity with transgender people, and believe that gay rights and transgender rights should be separated. This view stems from many reasons, including the difference between sexual identity and gender identity, and whether each is considered a "choice" or not.

Gay rights advocate John Aravosis said, "But when [the gay community is] asked—well, told—to put our civil rights on hold, possibly for the next two decades, until America catches up on its support for trans rights, a lot of gay people don't feel sufficiently vested in trans rights, sufficiently vested in the T being affixed to the LGB, to agree to such a huge sacrifice for people they barely know."

== Transgender people's legal rights in the United States ==
There is currently no federal law banning transgender discrimination against someone trying to change their name due to their gender identity. Changing the birth certificate requires either proof of surgical treatment or a court order in favor of the change (depending on the state), but still in some states this right will not be granted. A person can also change their gender marker on their Social Security card, and this does not require proof of surgical treatment.

Sex between members of the same gender has been legal nationwide in the United States since 2003 (Lawrence v. Texas), and marriage is currently recognized by the federal government. The United States has allowed gay people to serve openly in the military since 2011, though the status of openly transgender members has been in limbo since 2018. While currently there is no federal anti-discrimination laws for LGBT people, there are in 21 states and there is currently a bill passed in the US Senate that may provide protection on a federal level. The Matthew Shepard Act it expands the 1969 United States federal hate-crime laws to include crimes motivated by a victim's actual or perceived gender, sexual orientation, gender identity, or disability.

The Employment Non-Discrimination Act (ENDA), a bill that would make discriminating against LGBT people in the workplace illegal, passed in the US Senate on 7 November 2013. This was the first time in history where a transgender employment non-discrimination bill passed in the Senate. This bill was passed with a bipartisan majority.

In 2017, the Trump administration, through the Department of Justice, reversed the Obama-era policy which used Title VII of the Civil Rights Act to protect transgender employees from discrimination.

Bostock v. Clayton County, 590 U.S. ___ (2020), was a landmark Supreme Court case in which the Court ruled (on 15 June 2020) that Title VII of the Civil Rights Act of 1964 protects employees against discrimination because of their gender identity (or sexual orientation). A plaintiff in the case was Aimee Stephens, an openly transgender woman.

== Transgender inequality in Asia ==
Transgender individuals are often marginalized and encounter stigma and discrimination due to their sexual orientations, gender identities, and expressions in various Asian countries. Stigma on transgender identities is spread in various Asian societies through the cultural and social atmosphere, and it is rarely discussed openly in Asian culture, resulting in little support towards transgender individuals.

=== Social exclusion ===
Transgender individuals are usually subjected to enormous social weight to conceal their identity due to their social pressure. The environment is depressive to transgender's visibility as it is considered abnormal. Asian governments exhibit small resistance to social activism promoting transgender rights. Lost resources about such activism will not be published in mainstream media, and transgender individuals felt excluded in society and in their families. They hesitate to come out to their family because of the projected rejection.

=== Health ===
Transgender individuals are not categorized into the gender binary. Hence they are not covered by insurance and legal protection They are not protected by primary health care and refuse publicly funded gender-affirming health services. Transformation surgery in Asia is expensive but of low quality. It is illegal in India.

Besides physical health, transgender people confront mental health inequality as well. They experienced a high level of stress, which lead to a high rate of depression, anxiety, and suicidal ideation and behaviour. Since mental health awareness is not widespread in Asia, transgender individuals are declined access to mental health care.

=== Employment ===
It is difficult for transgender people to receive employment as official identification documents are required when entering the workplace, and they miss the relevant document. Job interviews eliminate most transgender individuals. Those who obtain an offer work in hostile surroundings and eventually decided to quit the job. Exclusion from mainstream occupations leads to their engagement in sex work as it becomes a means of income.

=== Law ===
Laws are constituted against transgender individuals and a barrier to equality. For instance, government regulation prohibited cross-dressing, and there is no restriction toward transgender discrimination. Public nuisance and vagrancy laws is used to unjustly abuse trans females in many parts of Asia, including Thailand, Singapore, Indonesia, Cambodia, Nepal, Malaysia and the Philippines. Dedicated religious police are accused of arresting trans individuals under these laws in some nations, such as Malaysia and Indonesia. Restrictive public policy on utilizing the concept of legal gender places restrictions on one's privacy and family life as well.

== See also ==
- Legal status of transgender people
- LGBT people in prison#Transgender issues
- LGBTQ health
- Mental health of LGBTQ people
- Right to personal identity
- Suicide among LGBTQ people
- Transgender disenfranchisement in the United States
- Transgender rights movement
- Transgender sex worker
- Transgender youth
