= Cum =

Cum, CUM or cu m may refer to:

== Transport ==
- Antonio José de Sucre Airport, Venezuela (IATA airport code CUM)
- Culham railway station, Oxfordshire, England (station code CUM)
- Cumberland station (Maryland), US (station code CUM)
- Chiba Urban Monorail, Chiba Prefecture, Japan

== Songs ==
- "Cum", a song by Mykki Blanco from the 2012 EP Mykki Blanco & the Mutant Angels
- "Cum", a song by Brooke Candy featuring Iggy Azalea from the 2019 album Sexorcism

== Other uses ==
- Sexual slang meaning semen, or to orgasm
- A Latin preposition meaning "with"
- cu m, or cubic metre, a measure of volume
- Montreal Urban Community (French: Communauté urbaine de Montréal), a former regional government in Quebec from 1970 to 2001
- Canada, the United States, and Mexico

== See also ==
- Come (disambiguation)
- Cwm (disambiguation)
