= Felton, Delaware =

- Town
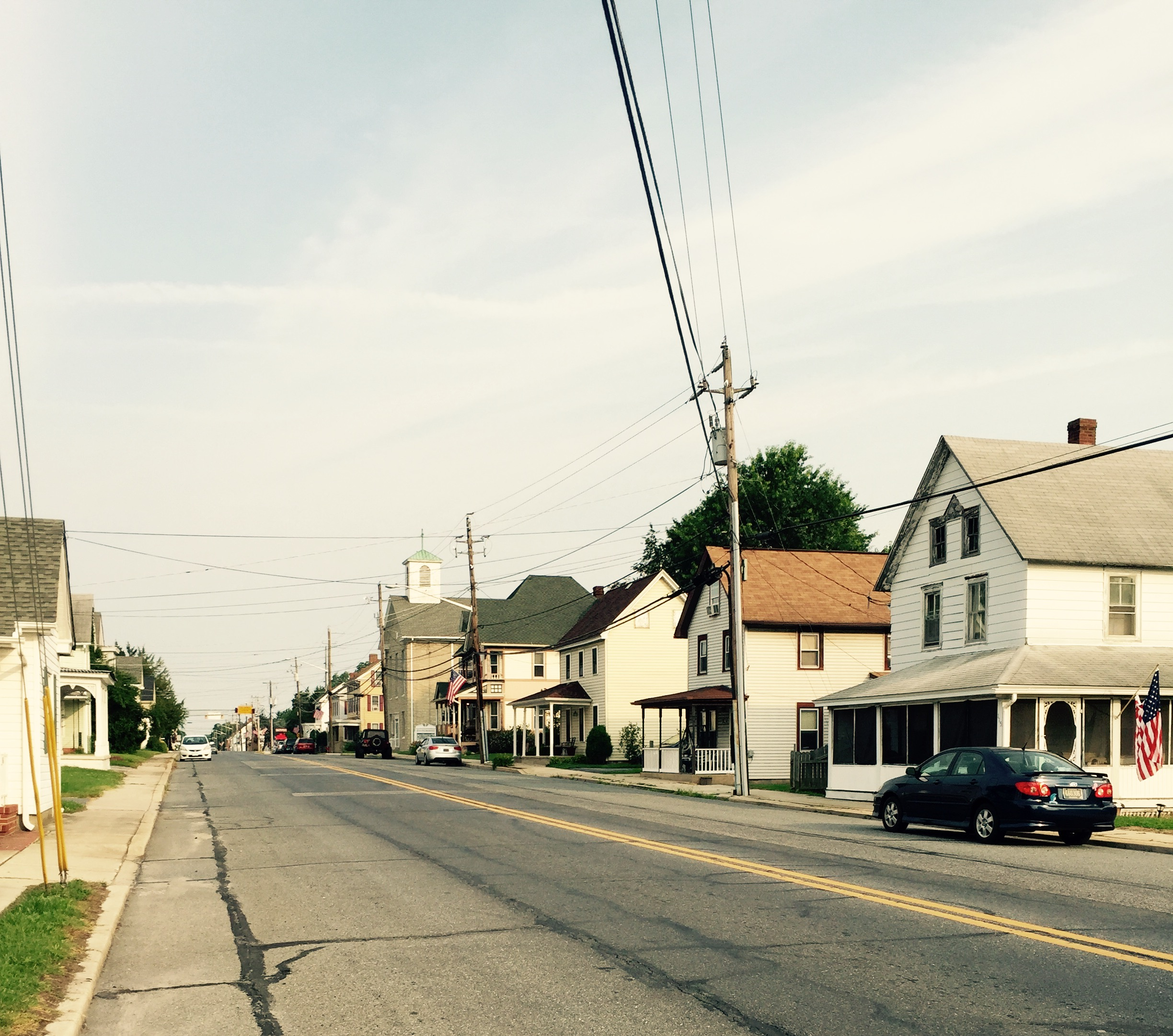
- Main Street in downtown Felton, July 2015

- Seal
- Etymology: President of the Philadelphia, Wilmington and Baltimore Railroad Samuel M. Felton Sr.
- Location of Felton in Kent County, Delaware.

- Location within the state of Delaware Felton (the United States)
- Coordinates: 39°00′30″N 75°34′41″W
- Country: United States
- State: Delaware
- County: Kent
- Incorporated: February 2, 1861

Area
  - Total: 0.78 sq mi (2.02 km^{2})
  - Land: 0.78 sq mi (2.02 km^{2})
  - Water: 0 sq mi (0.00 km^{2})
- Elevation: 56 ft (17 m)

Population (2020)
  - Total: 1,316
  - Density: 1,683.7/sq mi (650.07/km^{2})
- Time zone: UTC−5 (Eastern (EST))
  - Summer (DST): UTC−4 (EDT)
- ZIP code: 19943
- Area code: 302
- FIPS code: 10-26620
- GNIS feature ID: 215321
- Website: felton.delaware.gov

Felton is a town in Kent County, Delaware, United States. It is part of the Dover metropolitan statistical area. The population was 1,316 in 2020.

== History ==
Established in 1856 as a whistle stop along the Delaware Railroad, Felton was named after Samuel M. Felton Sr., then-president of the Philadelphia, Wilmington and Baltimore Railroad. As president, he was responsible for developing the Railroad in Delaware's rural areas, and by extension, the town's existence. Felton was incorporated on February 2, 1861, and passenger rail service would continue to the town until the early 1950s.

The Coombe Historic District, Thomas B. Coursey House, Felton Historic District, Felton Railroad Station, and Hughes Early Man Sites are listed on the National Register of Historic Places.

== Geography ==
Felton is located at 39°00′30″N 75°34′41″W (39.0084464, –75.5779807).

According to the United States Census Bureau, the town has a total area of 0.6 square miles (1.6 km^{2}), all land.

== Demographics ==
Historical population
Census	Pop.	Note	%±
1870	437		—
1880	383		−12.4%
1890	403		5.2%
1900	400		−0.7%
1910	451		12.8%
1920	771		71.0%
1930	463		−39.9%
1940	442		−4.5%
1950	453		2.5%
1960	423		−6.6%
1970	495		17.0%
1980	547		10.5%
1990	683		24.9%
2000	784		14.8%
2010	1,298		65.6%
2020	1,316		1.4%
U.S. Decennial Census

=== 2020 census ===
As of the 2020 census, Felton had a population of 1,316 people. The median age was 39.5 years. 22.6% of residents were under the age of 18 and 18.7% were 65 years of age or older. The male population was 602 and the female population was 714. For every 100 females there were 84.3 males, and for every 100 females age 18 and over there were 82.3 males age 18 and over. The median age was 38.0 for males and 41.2 for females.

99.2% of residents lived in urban areas, while 0.8% lived in rural areas.

There were 545 households, of which 34.5% had children under the age of 18 living in them. Of all households, 42.0% were married-couple households, 7.3% were cohabiting couple households, 15.6% had a male householder with no spouse or partner present, and 35.0% had a female householder with no spouse or partner present. About 28.3% of all households were made up of individuals, 15.6% had someone living alone who was 65 years of age or older, and 34.7% had an individual aged 65 or over.

There were 586 housing units, of which 7.0% were vacant. The homeowner vacancy rate was 3.1% and the rental vacancy rate was 7.0%.

The age distribution was 5.5% under 5 years old, 7.3% from 5 to 9, 6.2% from 10 to 14, 6.3% from 15 to 19, 5.2% from 20 to 24, 6.8% from 25 to 29, 7.3% from 30 to 34, 6.2% from 35 to 39, 5.5% from 40 to 44, 6.0% from 45 to 49, 5.5% from 50 to 54, 7.5% from 55 to 59, 6.0% from 60 to 64, 6.7% from 65 to 69, 5.6% from 70 to 74, 3.1% from 75 to 79, 2.0% from 80 to 84, and 1.0% aged 85 or older.

Racial composition as of the 2020 census
Race	Number	Percent
White	825	62.7%
Black or African American	328	24.9%
American Indian and Alaska Native	7	0.5%
Asian	13	1.0%
Native Hawaiian and Other Pacific Islander	1	0.1%
Some other race	43	3.3%
Two or more races	99	7.5%
Hispanic or Latino (of any race)	74	5.6%

=== Income and poverty ===
By 2023, the American Community Survey estimated the median income was $62,000. It estimated median income by types of families as married-couple families $100,938, families $98,056, and non-family households $40,565. Poverty was estimated at 7.4% compared to 9.6% for the rest of Delaware. 10.3% of those projected to be in poverty were under 18 years old, 7.0% were between 18 and 64 years, and 6.3% were 65 years and over.

== Education ==
Public school students in Felton are served by the Lake Forest School District. Schools include Lake Forest High School as well as Lake Forest North, the elementary school (Grades K–3), and Lake Forest Central, the older elementary school (Grades 4–5). Other schools in the district are located in Harrington and Frederica.

== Infrastructure ==
=== Transportation ===
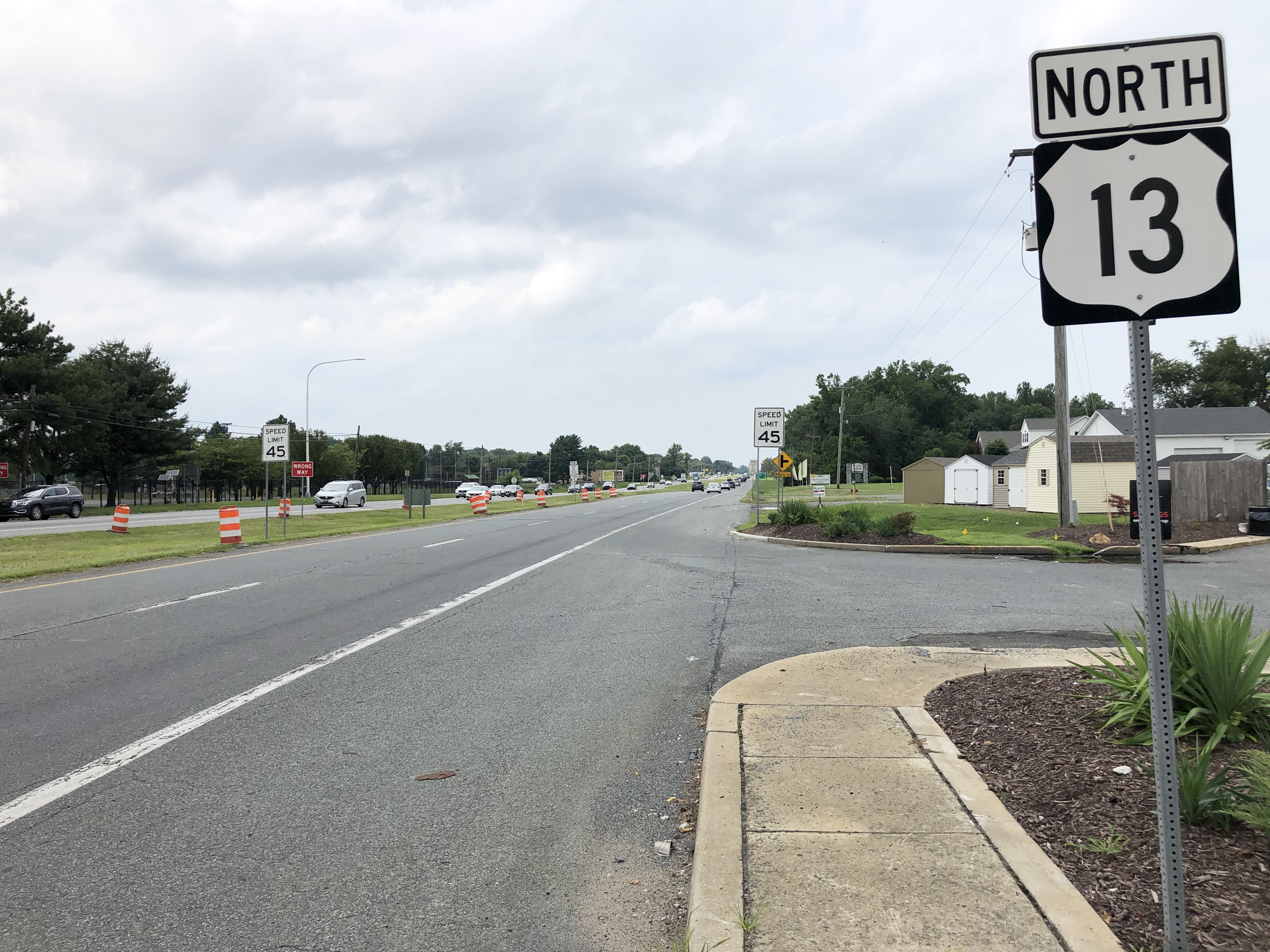
US 13 northbound in Felton

U.S. Route 13 runs north–south through Felton on Dupont Highway, heading north toward Dover and south toward Harrington. Delaware Route 12 runs east–west through Felton on Main Street, heading west toward Greensboro, Maryland and east toward Frederica. DART First State provides bus service to Felton along Route 117, which heads north toward Camden to connect to the local bus routes serving the Dover area and south toward Harrington. The Delmarva Central Railroad's Delmarva Subdivision line passes north–south through Felton.

=== Utilities ===
Delmarva Power, a subsidiary of Exelon, provides electricity to Felton. Chesapeake Utilities provides natural gas to the town. The Felton Water Department provides water to Felton, serving 550 homes, multiple businesses, and three schools. Trash and recycling collection in Felton is provided under contract by Waste Management.

== Notable people ==
- M. Evelyn Killen (1871–1951), President, Felton W.C.T.U.; President, Delaware State W.C.T.U.
- James H. Hughes (1867-1953), American lawyer and U.S senator
- C. J. Faison (born 1993), American stock car racing driver

== See also ==
- List of towns in Delaware
