= Felton station =

Railroad station in Delaware, US

Felton
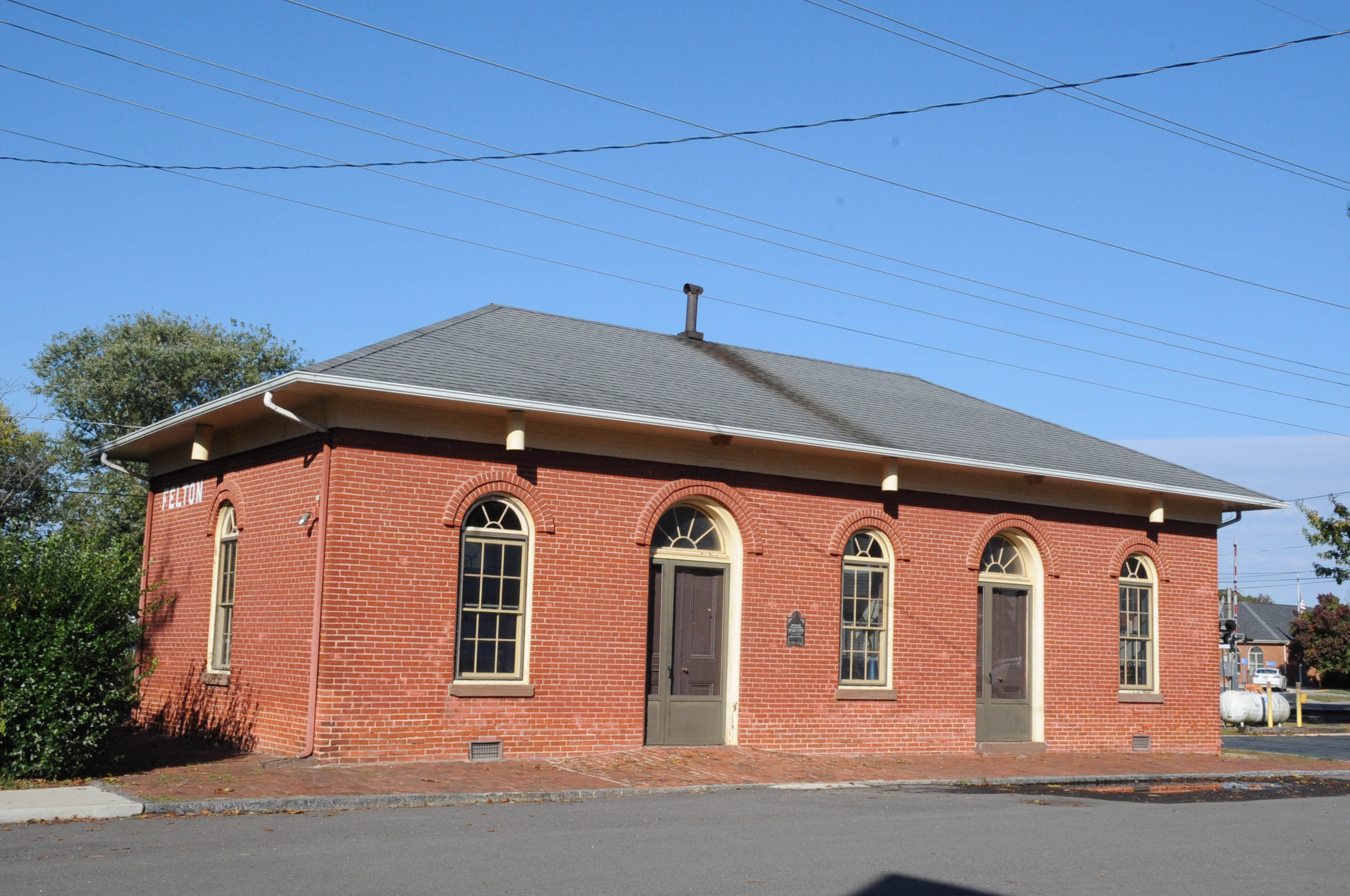
- Felton station in July 2017

General information
- Location: 215 East Railroad Avenue, Felton, Delaware

Former services
Preceding station	Pennsylvania Railroad	Following station
Harrington toward Cape Charles	Delmarva Division	Viola toward Wilmington
- Felton Railroad Station
- U.S. National Register of Historic Places
- Location within Delaware Location within the United States
- Location: 215 East Railroad Avenue; Felton, Delaware; United States
- Coordinates: 39°0′39″N 75°34′33″W
- Area: 0.2 acres (0.081 ha)
- Built: 1868
- Built by: Delaware Railroad Co.
- Architectural style: Italianate
- NRHP reference No.: 81000191
- Added to NRHP: July 13, 1981
Location

Felton Railroad Station is a historic railway station located at Felton, Delaware, United States, that is listed on the National Register of Historic Places.

== Description ==
The station was built by the Delaware Railroad in 1868, and is a one-story, five-bay, brick, Italianate-style building. It as a low hipped roof with shallow eaves, round-headed doorways and windows, and a projecting bow-front window. The station has been renovated for use as a museum.

It was added to the National Register of Historic Places July 13, 1981.

== See also ==
- National Register of Historic Places listings in Kent County, Delaware
