= Coombs (disambiguation) =

Coombs is a surname.

Coombs may also refer to:

- Coombs, British Columbia, a small community in British Columbia, Canada
- Coombs Lake, a lake in Minnesota

== See also ==
- Coombs test, a test for the presence of antibodies or antigens
- Coombs reagent, the reagent used in the Coombs test
- Coombs' method, a type of voting designed by the psychologist Clyde Coombs
- Coombes, a village and civil parish in the Adur District of West Sussex, England
- Coombe (disambiguation)
- Combs (disambiguation)
- Coomes (disambiguation)
