= Felton Historic District =

Historic district in Delaware, United States

- U.S. National Register of Historic Places
- U.S. Historic district
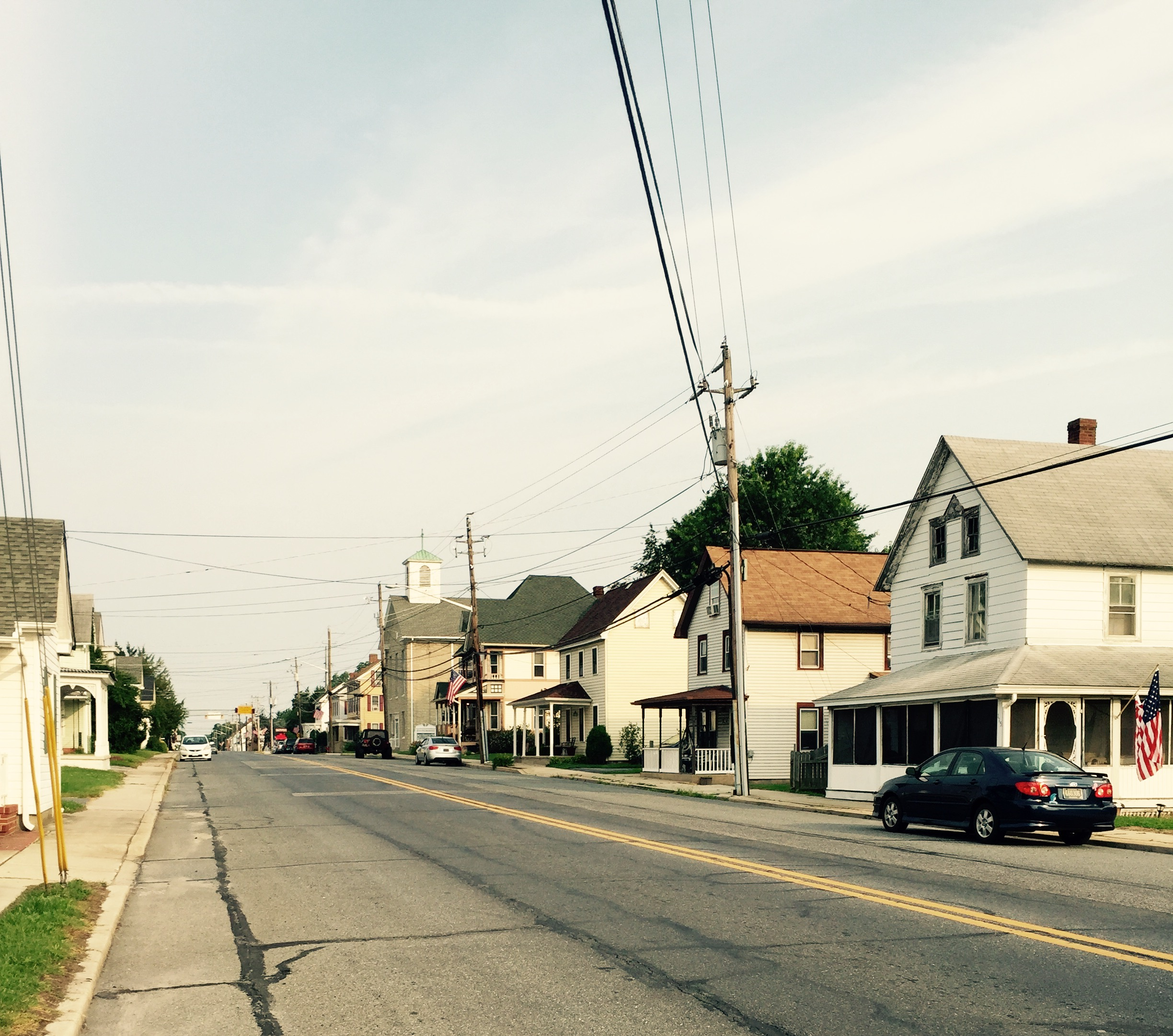
- East Main Street looking west, July 2015. The Felton United Methodist Church steeple is visible on the right.

- Location within Delaware Location within the United States
- Location: Roughly bounded by North, Walnut, Main, and Niles streets Felton, Delaware; United States
- Coordinates: 39°00′27″N 75°34′56″W
- Area: 38 acres (15 ha)
- Architectural style: Queen Anne, Delaware vernacular
- NRHP reference No.: 87002433
- Added to NRHP: January 26, 1988

The Felton Historic District is a historic district located at Felton, Delaware, United States, that is listed on the National Register of Historic Places.

== Description ==
The district encompasses 162 contributing buildings and 2 contributing structures in the town of Felton built between 1856 and 1940. The district includes a number of 19th and 20th century commercial, institutional, and residential buildings in a variety of popular architectural styles including Queen Anne and Delaware vernacular. Notable buildings include the United Methodist Church, Fountain House Hotel, Odd Fellows Hall, the Jackson hotel, Knights of Pythias Hall, the Alvin B. Connor House, the Godwin house, Hargardine House, and the Former Public School.

It was listed on the National Register of Historic Places January 26, 1988.

== See also ==
- National Register of Historic Places listings in Kent County, Delaware
