= Hughes Early Man Sites =

Archaeological site in Delaware, United States

- U.S. National Register of Historic Places
- Nearest city: Felton, Delaware
- Area: 119.5 acres (48.4 ha)
- NRHP reference No.: 79000623
- Added to NRHP: July 24, 1979

The Hughes Early Man Sites are a complex of prehistoric archaeological sites in central Kent County, Delaware, near the town of Felton. The complex includes six areas of concentrated finds located on well-drained knolls. Finds include a Clovis projectile point, a collection of notched projectile points, bifaces, and remnants of stone tool-making activities.

The sites were listed on the National Register of Historic Places in 1979.

== See also ==
- National Register of Historic Places listings in Kent County, Delaware
