= Michelle Coombs =

American geologist

Dr. Michelle L. Coombs Ph.D.
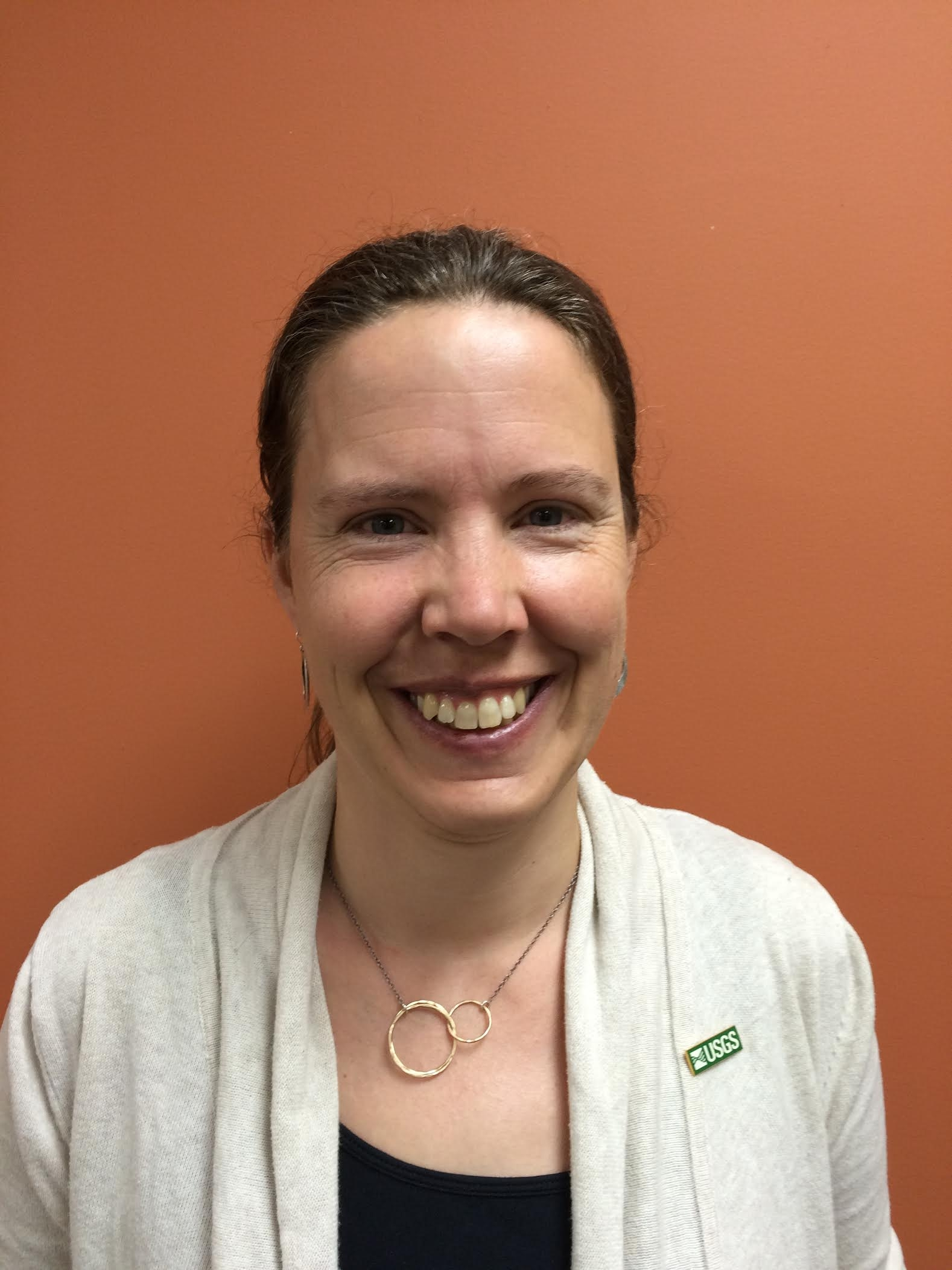
- Coombs pictured in 2016
- Title: Geologist and Past SIC (AVO); Affiliate Faculty (UAF)

Academic background
- Education: Williams College (BA); University of Alaska Fairbanks (PhD)
- Website: www.usgs.gov/staff-profiles/michelle-l-coombs

Michelle Lynn Coombs is a geologist at the Alaska Volcano Observatory (AVO). She was the Scientist-in-Charge from 2016 to 2023. Coombs is a fellow of the Geological Society of America.

== Education ==
- 1994: B.A. Geology (Williams College)
- 2001: Ph.D. Geology (University of Alaska Fairbanks)

== Personal life ==
Coombs is married to USGS geologist Evan Thoms.

Michelle is originally from Maine, where Coombs is a common last name.

== Career ==
Coombs was the Scientist-in-Charge (SIC) of AVO from 2016 to 2023. As the SIC, she was in charge of coordinating emergency responses to volcanic eruptions, and guides the process of monitoring volcanic activity in Alaska. She is frequently quoted in the news as a subject-matter expert on volcanoes in and around Alaska. As the SIC, she was also the main contact from the media to AVO. Dr. Matthew Haney became the new SIC of AVO in August 2023, succeeding Coombs.

She is the second woman in AVO history to serve as the Alaskan SIC, as Terry Keith held the position from 1994–99. When she became SIC in 2016, she was one of 3 women serving as a Scientist-in-Charge of a USGS-operated Volcano Observatory, but as of March 2023, she was the only one.

She has worked with the AVO since 2004, before which she worked for the USGS's Volcano Hazards Program out of Menlo Park, California; which she joined after completing her Ph.D.

While Coombs was in college, she was a field assistant to Judy Fierstein. Once she began working at AVO, she became a mentee of Terry Keith and Tina Neal.

Coombs was the advisor to a 2011 internship studying the 2006 eruption of Augustine Volcano. She had previously co-edited a 2010 U.S. Geological Survey Professional Paper on the eruption.

Coombs has also been a participant of a volcanic eruptions workshop from the National Academies.

=== Research ===
Coomb's main research focus is volcanology. Much of her research is on volcanic geology in Alaska, but she has also published research on volcanoes in Hawaii, and her doctoral dissertation was on Mount Desert Island, Maine.

Coombs is an expert on the geology of the Aleutian Arc, having published extensively on it.

In 2019, Coombs and a group of collaborators were awarded a NSF grant to model eruptions of Alaskan volcanoes.

== Affiliations ==
As well as currently being a fellow to the Geological Society of America (GSA), she stood on the Student Awards Committee for the American Geophysical Union (AGU) from 2011–2015.

Coombs was an Associate Editor for the Bulletin of Volcanology (2013–2016), and was on the editorial board of Journal of Volcanology and Geothermal Research (2007–2018). She has also served as a Steering Committee member for the Community Network for Volcanic Eruption Response (CONVERSE).
