= Lacombe =

Lacombe may refer to:

== Places ==
- Lacombe, Alberta, Canada
- Lacombe County, Alberta, Canada
- Lacombe, Louisiana, United States
- Lacombe, Aude, France
- Lacombe (provincial electoral district), Canada
- Lacombe (territorial electoral district), Canada

== People ==
- Albert Lacombe (1827–1916), oblate missionary to the Cree and Blackfoot
- Bernard Lacombe (1952–2025), French football (soccer) player and manager
- Bernard Lacombe (rugby union) (born 1963), French rugby union and rugby league player
- Brigitte Lacombe (born 1950), French photographer
- Claire Lacombe (1765–?), French actress and revolutionary
- Diane Lacombe (born 1976), French former backstroke swimmer
- Emile Henry Lacombe (1846–1924), American judge
- François Lacombe (born 1948), Canadian ice hockey player
- Georges Lacombe (painter) (1868–1916), French sculptor and painter
- Georges Lacombe (director) (1902–1990) French film director and writer
- Grégory Lacombe (born 1982), French football (soccer) player
- Guy Lacombe (born 1955), French football (soccer) player
- Hervé Lacombe (born 1963), French musicologist
- Jackson LaCombe (born 2001), American ice hockey player
- Jacques Lacombe (writer) (1724–1811), French bookseller and lawyer
- Jacques Lacombe (born 1963), Canadian conductor
- Louis Lacombe (1818–1884), French pianist and composer
- Mathieu Lacombe, Canadian politician
- Michel Lacombe (born 1973), Canadian comic artist
- Normand Lacombe (born 1964), Canadian ice hockey player
- Xavier Lacombe (born 1965), French politician

== Other uses ==
- Lacombe, Lucien, a 1974 French war drama film by Louis Malle
- Lacombe pig, a breed of domestic pig
- Combe (disambiguation)
