= Kombe =

Kombe may refer to:

- Kombe people
- Kombe language
- Kombe (Lycia), an ancient city
- Kömbe, a baked filled pastry of Turkey and Azerbaijan

== People with the surname ==
- Paulin Tokala Kombe (born 1977), DR Congolese football player
- Saviour Kombe (born 1991), Zambian track and field sprinter
- Imran Kombe, Tanzanian military officer

== See also ==
- Katakokombe, a region in the Democratic Republic of Congo
  - Katako'kombe Airport
  - Katako-Kombe Territory
- Strophanthus kombe, a vine found in the tropical regions of Eastern Africa
