= Coomb =

Coomb is an alternate spelling of combe.

It may also refer to:

- Arthur Coomb (born 1929), English cricketer
- Coomb (unit), a unit of measure by volume.
- Coombs test, an aid to medical diagnosis.
- Coomb Teak or Gmelina arborea, a medicinal tree.

== See also ==
- Deeping Coomb, a fictional deep valley in The Lord of the Rings.
- Coombe (disambiguation)
- Combe (disambiguation)
- Cwm (disambiguation)
