= Thomas B. Coursey House =

Historic house in Delaware, United States

- U.S. National Register of Historic Places
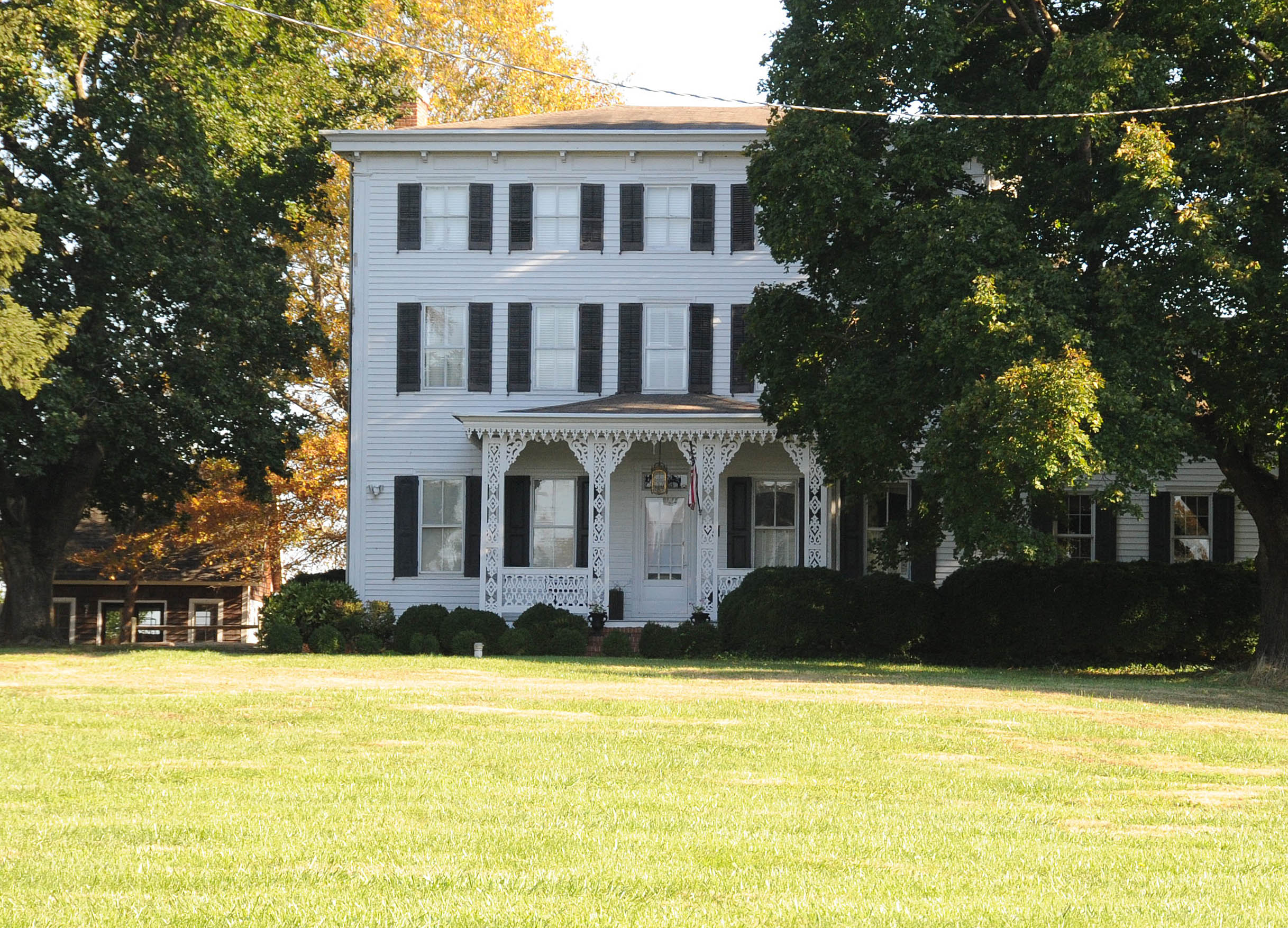

- Location within Delaware Location within the United States
- Location: 5578 Canterbury Road, Felton, Delaware 19943
- Coordinates: 38°59′27″N 75°30′42″W
- Area: 5.5 acres (2.2 ha)
- Built: 1867
- Architectural style: Italianate
- NRHP reference No.: 90001069
- Added to NRHP: July 23, 1990

Thomas B. Coursey House is a historic home located north of Coursey Pond near Felton, Kent County, Delaware. It was built in 1867, and is a three-story, five-bay, low hip-roofed, center-hall passage, single-pile, rectangular-plan, large frame house. It has Italianate-style design details. Attached to the main house are a two-story, shed-roofed north wing and to the east there is a recently added one-story, shed-roofed wing. It was the home of Thomas B. Coursey, a prominent figure in 19th century Kent County.

It was listed on the National Register of Historic Places in 1990.
