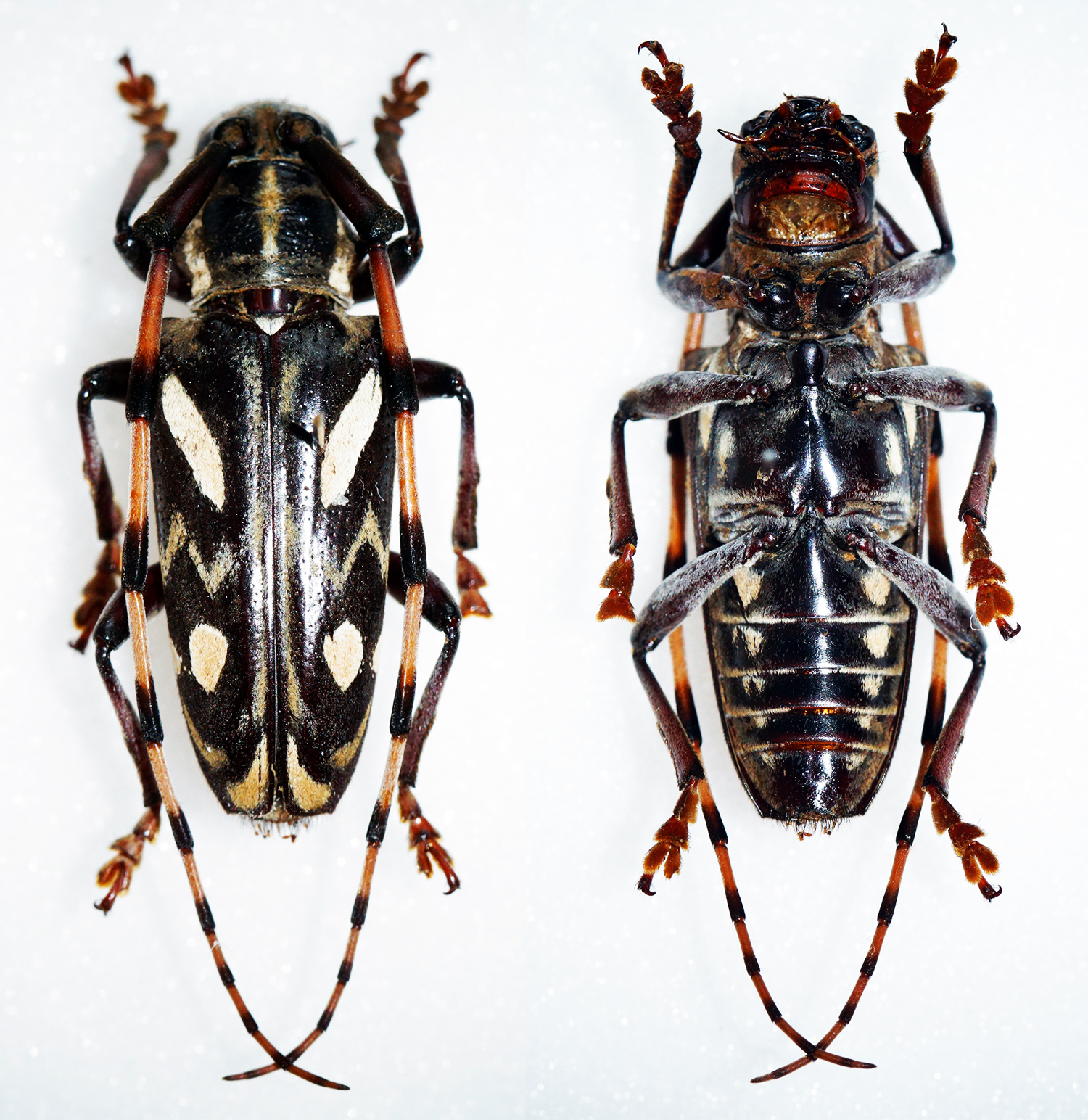

Scientific classification
- Domain: Eukaryota
- Kingdom: Animalia
- Phylum: Arthropoda
- Class: Insecta
- Order: Coleoptera
- Suborder: Polyphaga
- Infraorder: Cucujiformia
- Family: Cerambycidae
- Tribe: Monochamini
- Genus: Combe; Thomson, 1864
- Species: C. brianus

Binomial name
- Combe brianus (White, 1858)

= Combe brianus =

Species of beetle

Combe brianus is a species of beetle in the family Cerambycidae, and the only species in the genus Combe. It is found in Indonesia, Malaysia, and Nepal.
