= Christian Witness Ministries =

Non-denominational church affiliation

Christian Witness Ministries (CWM) is a non-denominational church affiliation founded by the former National General Secretary of the Assemblies of God in Australia 1989–1992, Philip Powell. CWM publishes a quarterly magazine, Contending Earnestly for The Faith (CETF), of which Philip Powell is the editor (B. Michael Bigg assistant editor) and to which a number of authors from different backgrounds contribute, including Dave Hunt (Christian apologist), Bill Randles, Mike Gendron, Aeron Morgan, Jeffrey Whittaker, Mark Mullins, Roger Winter-Smith, and Larry DeBruyn. CWM also runs a bookshop and conducts Bible conferences and ministry tours featuring the above speakers plus Justin Peters and Peter Stokes. CWM is a watchman discernment ministry.

== History ==
Philip Powell left the Australian Assemblies of God in 1992, believing that the church was preaching false doctrines and supporting false prophets and teachers. After his departure from the AOG, Powell became associated with others, who have come to similar conclusions. Philip with his wife, Kathleen launched Christian Witness Ministries in 1994, and began to publish a quarterly magazine entitled Contending EARNESTLY for THE Faith (CETF) out of Hamilton, New Zealand. There are now clearing offices in Australia and the UK as well as in New Zealand. The magazine is now published from Brisbane, Australia.

== Ministry ==
Christian Witness Ministries is committed to spreading the Bible based Gospel (Good News) of Jesus Christ and to maintaining "the faith which was once [for all] delivered unto the saints" - Jude 3. With this mission in mind CWM, fearlessly identifies the teachers in the church who spread aberrant non-biblical teaching, their false works and utterances, that abound in our time. They believe in the present day reality of the Holy Spirit and His work in and through the believer in the fruit and the gifts.

CWM is biblical in basis, Evangelical in emphasis, and Evangelistic in purpose. They endeavour to follow Paul the Apostle's example in preaching the good news of Christ to both Jews & Gentiles.

CWM is therefore both a teaching and a warning ministry. They endeavour to keep a balance, in line with the Bible on both aspects, in the spoken and written word. They refuse to entertain doctrinally or morally suspect teachings and teachers and have no desire or intention to establish a hierarchical denomination or movement. They do however recognise all who are sound in their teaching about Jesus Christ and His Gospel, as fellow believers — those who the New Testament calls "saints".

With these things in mind CWM recognises a group of voluntary networking churches and fellowships without reference to Christian denomination. CWM has a Statement of Faith and Mission.

CWM has made a stand against Australian Assemblies of God pastor Frank Houston, the father of Hillsong Church's Brian Houston. CWM is also a major critic of Hillsong Church. CWM is mentioned in Tanya Levin's controversial book about Hillsong, People in Glass Houses.
