= Justice Combs =

Justice Combs may refer to:

- Dan Jack Combs (1924–2002), associate justice of the Kentucky Supreme Court
- Doug Combs (born 1951), associate justice and chief justice of the Oklahoma Supreme Court
- Sara Walter Combs (born 1948), associate justice and chief justice of the Kentucky Court of Appeals

== See also ==
- William H. Coombs (1808–1894), associate justice of the Supreme Court of Indiana
