= Coombe Hill Wood =

Protected area in London, England

Coordinates: 51.41866°N 0.25121°W

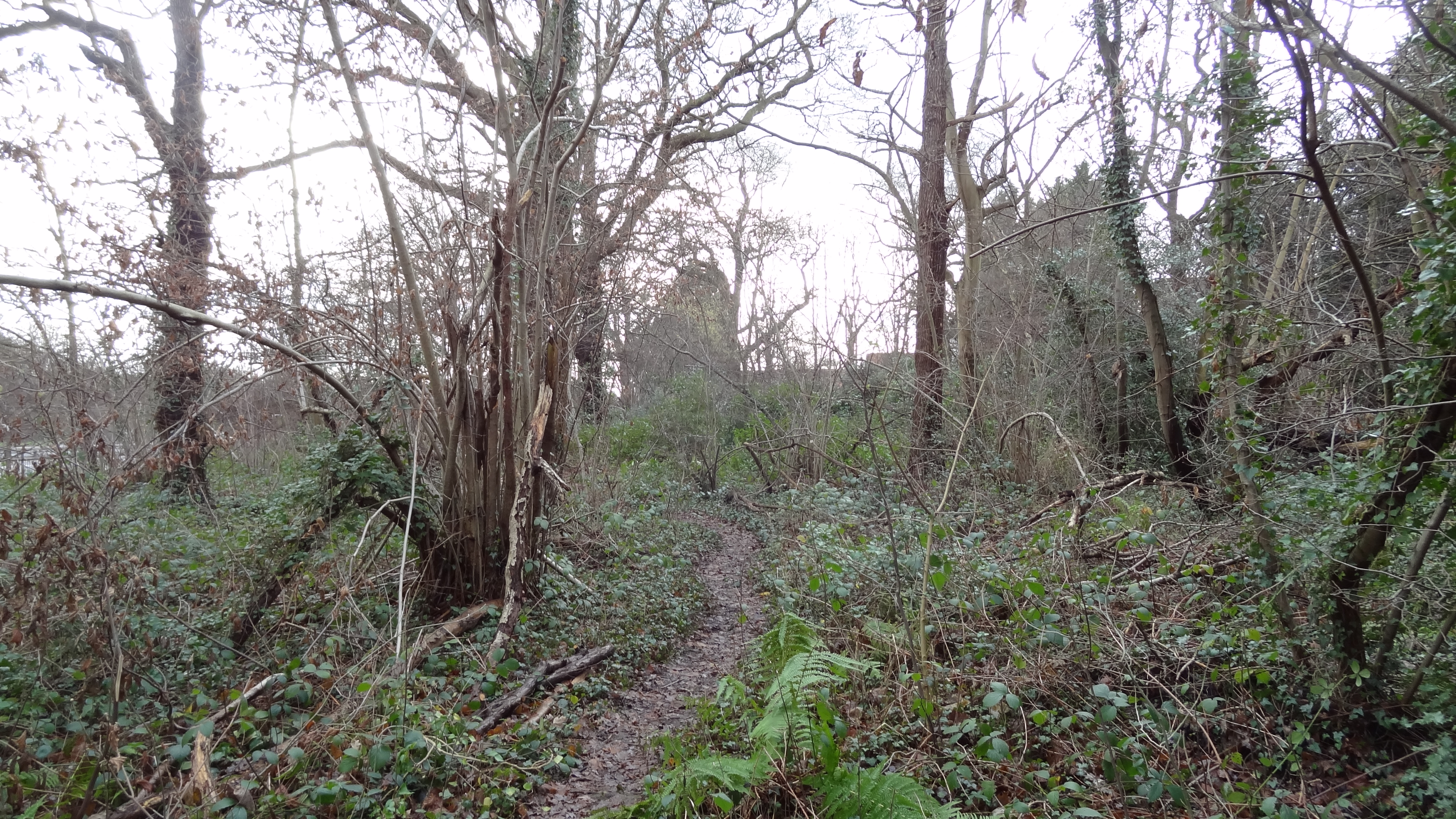

Coombe Hill Wood is a 2-hectare (4.9-acre) local nature reserve in Coombe in the Royal Borough of Kingston upon Thames in London. It is owned and managed by Kingston Council, and was declared a local nature reserve in 1992.

The site is ancient woodland, with oaks and an understorey of hazel. It is located between Robin Hood Way (A3 road) and Henley Drive.
