= Coombe Clipless Pedal =

Type of bicycle pedal

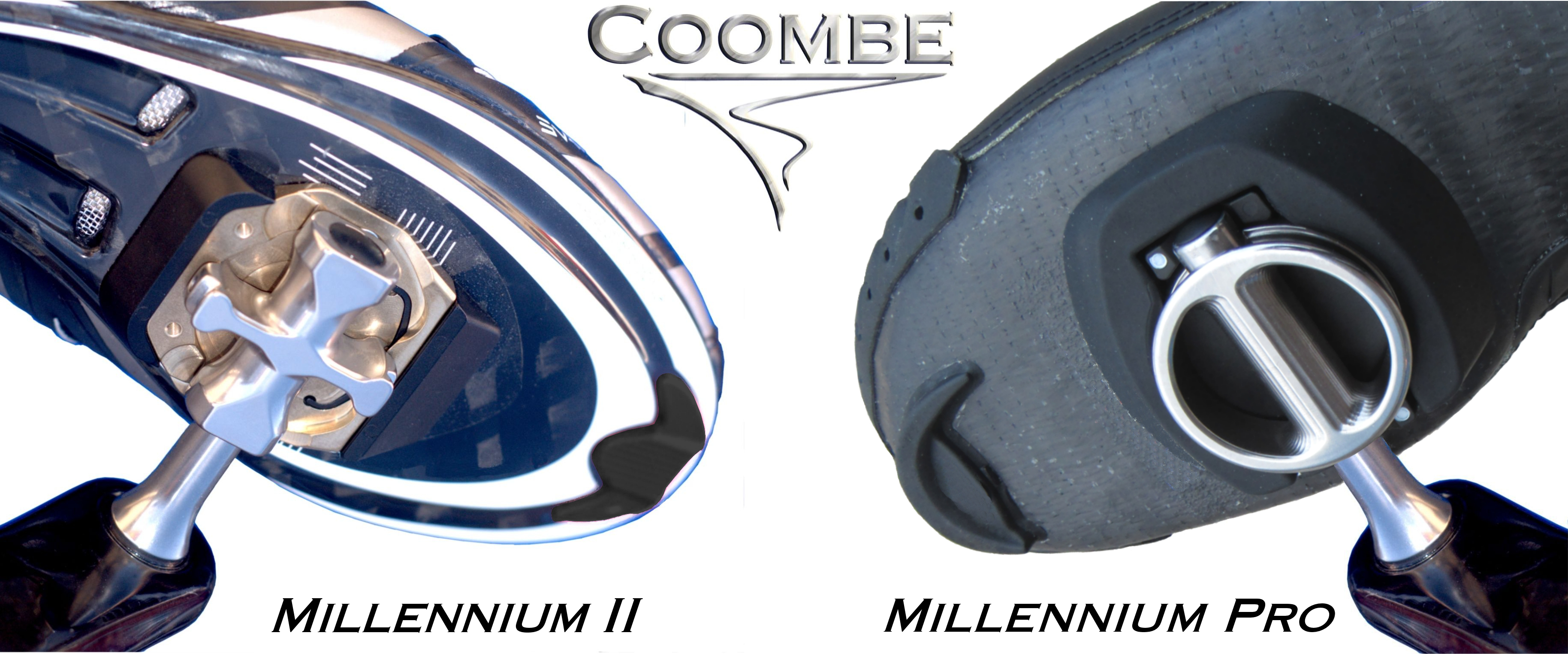
Coombe Millennium II and Millennium Pro pedal systems.

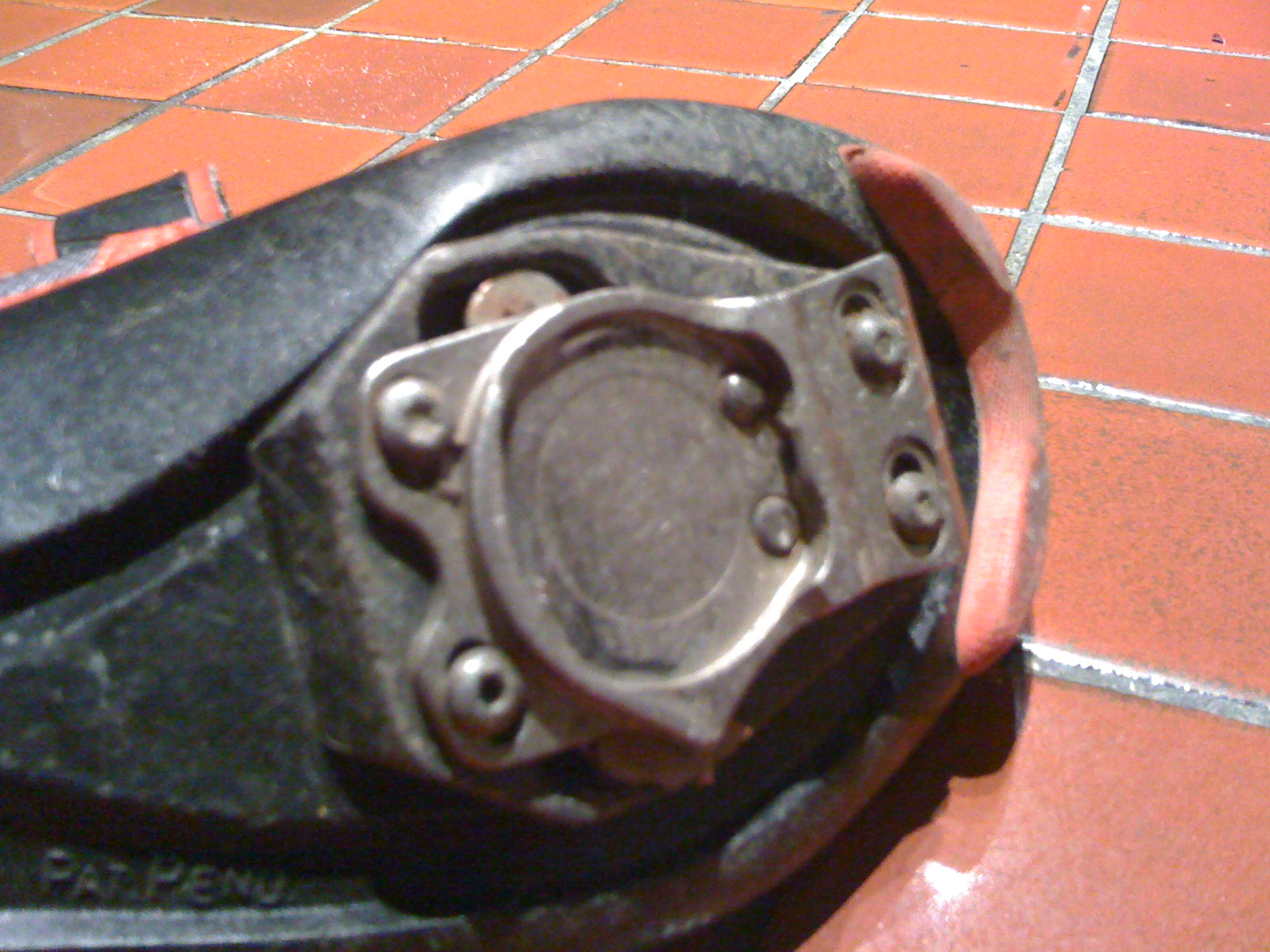
Coombe Pro 4 bolt cleat

Coombe Pedal Systems are high performance clipless bicycle pedals, manufactured by W. Coombe Engineering Ltd. in Boulder, Colorado, USA.

The original "Coombe Pro" pedal system, released in 1999, featured an exceptionally reliable, twist-in to engage, retention mechanism, along with a compact, yet highly load rated, triple row bearing design, both of which were patented by William Coombe in Boulder, Colorado in May 2001, under US Patents #6234046 and #6227071.

Though hailed by many cyclists to be the "best pedal" made, due to its high quality materials, low stack height, and secure retention mechanism, this model was discontinued in 2006 after most road cycling shoe soles changed to only having the 3 bolt cleat mounting pattern, which the Pro cleats were not directly compatible with.

Subsequently, the "Millennium II" and "Millennium Pro" pedal systems were introduced. Both of these pedal systems feature the same high quality materials, low stack heights, and triple row bearings, like the original Pro pedals, however, the pedal bodies and cleats are directly mounted to standard 3 bolt hole road cycling shoes.

In February 2026, the company announced that a new high performance pedal system, with separate cleats made for both road, and mountain shoes, would be available later in the year.
