= Terry Keith =

American geologist

Terry E. C. Keith

Terry E. C. Keith is a geologist from the U.S. Geological Survey and former Scientist-in-Charge of the Alaska Volcano Observatory.

== Career ==
Keith served as the Scientist-in-Charge (SIC) of the Alaska Volcano Observatory (AVO) from 1994–99. She is one of two women to serve as Alaska SIC, the other one being Michelle Coombs. During her tenure at AVO, she was a mentor to Coombs.

As the SIC, Keith was often in charge of media statements, and as such has often been quoted in the news as an authoritative figure on Alaskan geology.

Keith has also published geologic research on Yellowstone National Park.
