= Everett R. Combs =

American politician (1876–1957)

Personal details
- Born: Everett Randolph Combs; January 18, 1876 Russell County, Virginia, U.S.
- Died: January 5, 1957 (aged 80) Richmond, Virginia, U.S.
- Resting place: Lebanon Baptist Church Cemetery; Lebanon, Virginia, U.S.
- Party: Republican; Democratic
- Spouse: Rassa Candler (m. 1897; died 1949)
- Children: 7
- Education: Tazewell College
- Occupation: Politician

Everett Randolph Combs (January 18, 1876 – January 5, 1957) was an American politician from Virginia. He served as the first comptroller of Virginia in the 1930s and as clerk of the Virginia Senate from 1940 to 1957.

== Early life ==
Everett Randolph Combs was born January 18, 1876, in Russell County, Virginia, to Jane (née Kiser) and John Williams Combs. He attended Tazewell College from 1896 to 1897. He then taught school and farmed.

== Career ==
Combs was originally a Republican before becoming a Democrat. In 1911, Combs ran for clerk of the Russell County Circuit Court. He won the election by 600 votes. In 1919, he was re-elected as clerk and remained in office until 1927. By the 1920s, he allied with Democratic political leader Harry F. Byrd. In 1923, he helped Byrd fight a highway bond proposal. In 1925, he managed Byrd's campaign for governor in the 9th district. In 1928, Byrd, now governor, appointed Combs as Comptroller of Virginia. He served in the role throughout the early 1930s, except for a period of six months in 1938 when he was manager of the Reconstruction Finance Corporation in Richmond. In 1934, he became the first chairman of the State Compensation Board. In 1940, he was elected as clerk of the Virginia Senate. He was re-elected as clerk successive terms and remained in the role until his death. In 1954, he took a leave of absence to recuperate from illness in Florida. In 1942, he returned as chairman of the Compensation Board. In 1950, he resigned his role as chairman. While on the board, he was criticized as "the operating boss of the Byrd machine" and for making the board "a political agency". He went by the nickname "The Chief". He was a Virginia delegate at the 1940, 1944 and 1948 Democratic National Conventions.

In 1956, he traveled with Governor Thomas B. Stanley on a five-week tour of Europe to prepare for the 1957 Jamestown Festival.

== Personal life ==
Combs married Rassa Candler in 1897. They had two sons and five daughters, Carlton E., Earl B., Willie A., Bernice, Nancy, Mrs. Joseph A. Leslie Jr. and Mrs. Paul P. Spring. His wife died in 1949. He was a Mason and a member of the First Baptist Church in Richmond.

Towards the end of his life, Combs lived at Hotel Richmond. He died following a heart attack on January 5, 1957, at Johnston-Willis Hospital in Richmond. He was buried in West Hill Cemetery in Lebanon.
