= Robert Coombs (cricketer) =

English cricketer

Personal information
- Full name: Robert Vincent Jerome Coombs
- Born: 20 July 1959 (age 67); Chipping Barnet, Hertfordshire, England
- Batting: Right-handed
- Bowling: Left-arm orthodox spin
- Role: Bowler

Domestic team information
- Years: Team
- 1985–1986: Somerset
- First-class debut: 14 August 1985 Somerset v Middlesex
- Last First-class: 19 August 1986 Somerset v Surrey

Career statistics
Competition	First-class
Matches	13
Runs scored	32
Batting average	5.33
100s/50s	–/–
Top score	18
Balls bowled	2099
Wickets	32
Bowling average	34.75
5 wickets in innings	1
10 wickets in match	–
Best bowling	5/58
Catches/stumpings	3/–
- Source: CricketArchive, 11 March 2011

Robert Vincent Jerome Coombs (born 20 July 1959) played first-class cricket for Somerset in 1985 and 1986. He was born at Barnet, Hertfordshire.

Coombs was a tall left-arm orthodox spin bowler and a tail-end right-handed batsman. Educated at Exeter University, he had played Minor Counties cricket for Dorset and second eleven cricket for Hampshire before arriving at Somerset in 1985. Brought into the first-team late in an unexpectedly poor season for the county side, Coombs made an immediate impact, taking the first five Middlesex wickets to fall in a rain-ruined match at Weston-super-Mare at a cost of 58 runs. In a soggy end to the 1985 season, Coombs bowled in only three further first-class innings spread across three rain-affected matches, but he took 11 further wickets in those and his 16 wickets at an average of 16.75 put him at the top of Somerset's bowling for the season. Wisden Cricketers' Almanack noted approvingly his "good bowling action and attacking bent". More frequent games in 1986, however, brought little success and the bowling figures from his first match remained the best of his short first-class career. In 1987, he was back playing Minor Counties cricket for Dorset and remained there until 1990. He did not play any List A cricket.
