= James Coombes =

James Coombes may refer to:

- James Coombes (actor) (born 1956), British actor
- France v James Coombes & Co, a UK labour law case
- Jamie Coombes, Gibraltarian footballer
