= Coombs Lake =

Lake in the state of Minnesota, United States

- Location within Minnesota
- Location: Meeker County, Minnesota
- Coordinates: 44°58′49″N 94°32′36″W
- Type: Lake

Coombs Lake is a lake in Meeker County, in the U.S. state of Minnesota.

Coombs Lake was named for Vincent Coombs, a pioneer who settled there.

== See also ==
- List of lakes in Minnesota
