= Combes =

Combes may refer to:

== Places ==
- Combes, Hérault, a commune in Hérault, France
- Combes, Switzerland, a former municipality that merged with Le Landeron in 1875
- Combes, Texas, United States

== People ==
- Charles Combes (1801–1872), French engineer
- Émile Combes (1835–1921), French statesman and one of the originators of the concept of Separation of Church and State
- Laura Combes (1953–1989), American bodybuilder
- Françoise Combes (born 1952), French astrophysicist
- Michel Combes, (born 1962), French business executive
- Caroline Combes (born 1972), French voice actress
- Ted Combes, American politician

== See also ==
- 3446 Combes, a minor planet
- Les Combes, a commune in Bourgogne-Franche-Comté, France
- Combs (disambiguation)
