= Joe Coombs =

British canoe slalom athlete

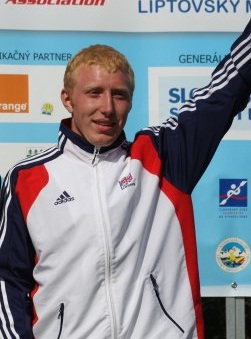
- Coombs on Podium in 2009

Personal information
- Nationality: British
- Born: 17 March 1991 (age 35) Salisbury, Wiltshire
- Height: 1.78 m (5 ft 10 in) (2011)
- Weight: 76 kg (168 lb) (2011)
- Website: www.joecoombs.co.uk

Sport
- Sport: Canoe slalom
- Event: Mens Kayak - K1M
- College team: Nottingham Trent University
- Club: Salisbury Canoe Club
- Team: Great Britain Under 23 Team
- Coached by: Mark Ratcliffe

Achievements and titles
- Highest world ranking: 107th (2010)
Medal record
Representing Great Britain and England
Men's canoe slalom
European Championships
Silver medal – second place	2009 Liptovsky Mikulas	K1-team

Joe Coombs (born 17 March 1991 in Salisbury) is a British canoe slalom athlete who competed between 2003 and 2014. His results include a Silver Medal at the Junior European Championships in 2009 (team-event), 15th at the ICF Senior Pre-world Championships in 2010, and a UK ranking of 5th.

Coombs also competed for Nottingham Trent University and took 3 golds in the 2011 BUCS Canoe Slalom Championships.
