= Coombe Historic District =

Historic district in Delaware, United States

- U.S. National Register of Historic Places
- U.S. Historic district
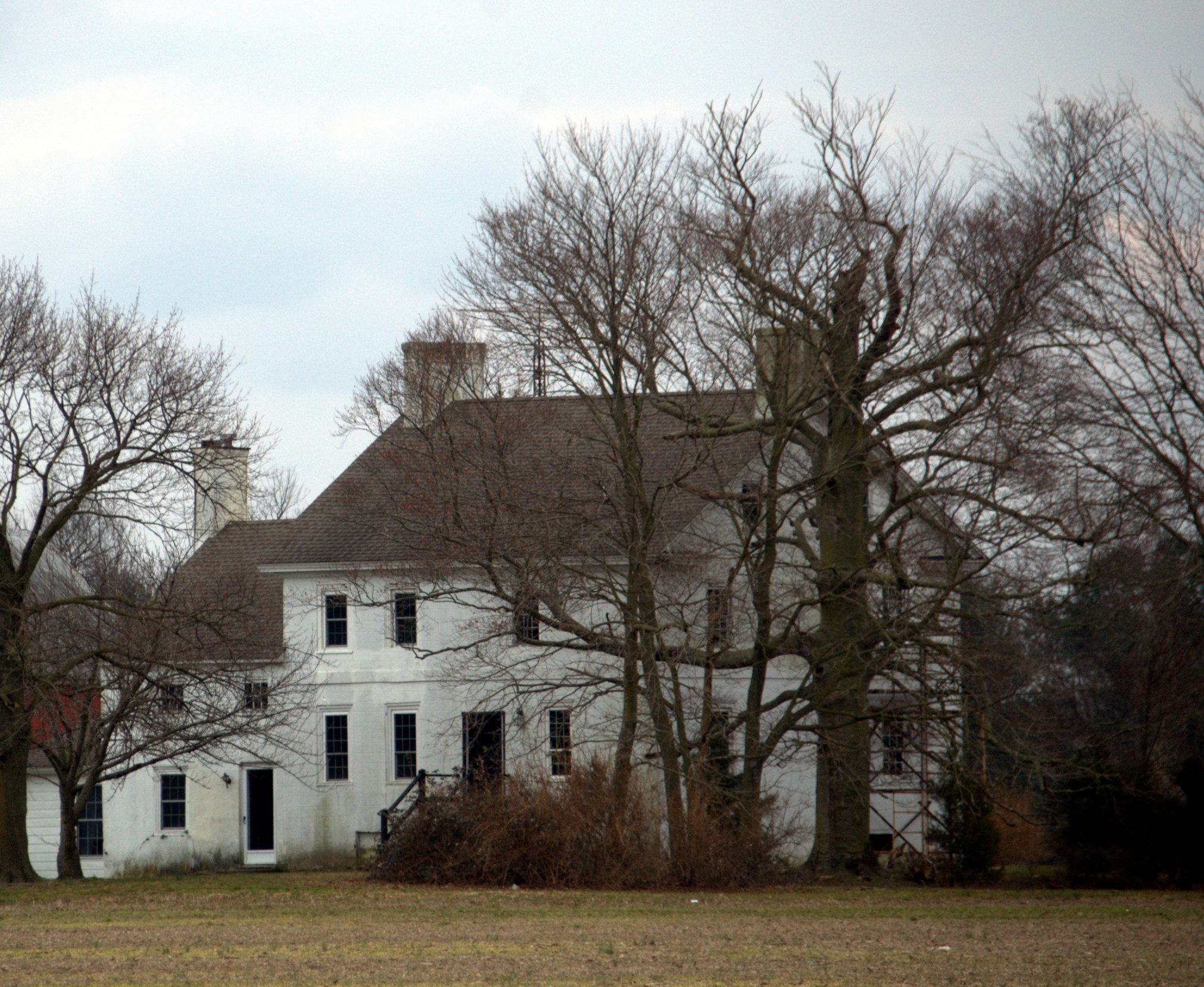
- Benjamin Coombe House

- Location within Delaware Location within the United States
- Location: West of Felton on Delaware Route 12 and Road 281, near Felton, Delaware
- Coordinates: 39°00′09″N 75°37′10″W
- Area: 34 acres (14 ha)
- Built: 1778
- Architectural style: Victorian Eclectic
- NRHP reference No.: 82002313
- Added to NRHP: April 8, 1982

The Coombe Historic District is a national historic district located at Felton, Kent County, Delaware. It encompasses two contributing buildings and one contributing structure near the town of Felton representing an unusual mixture of archaeological resources, both prehistoric and historic, in combination with two excellent examples of domestic architecture from the 18th and 19th centuries. They are the brick Benjamin Coombe House, built in 1778, and the frame Caldwell House, built in 1882 with their respective outbuildings. It also includes the Hopkins Cemetery, begun in the late-19th century, and three historic archaeological house sites, as well as an area of prehistoric occupation that was listed in the National Register of Historic Places in 1979 as "Area F" in the Hughes Early Man Complex.

It was listed on the National Register of Historic Places in 1982.

== Description ==
To the east, the eighteenth-century facade stands among a group of trees and frame outbuildings, about 400 feet south of the road where the Coombe House lies. In the 1880s, the orientation of the house was reversed by remodeling the exterior. A full facade hip-roofed veranda supported by 4 hollow wooden columns was added to the west elevation, proclaiming the change. The exterior was coated with stucco, which was scored in blocks measuring 10 inches by 18 inches to imitate common bond coursing, and as a result, the original brickwork's bonding pattern is now concealed. Members of the present owner's family recall an oral account indicating that thirteen steel hatchets were worn down in the process of scoring the brick to insure a good bond for the new stucco. The residence is 2 stories high and 2 rooms deep with an unbalanced 4-bay arrangement of openings on the original facade and a symmetrical 3-bay on the opposite elevation (currently the facade). Centrally located interior end chimneys rise from the gable ends of the principal block to vent corner hearths within. The eaves of the wood-shingled gable roof, which now overhangs the gable ends and is covered by composition shingles, are defined by a shallow box cornice with partial returns added during the remodeling. Additionally, on the west elevation of the second story, incised in the stucco between the central and south windows, is the date ‘1778’ within a five-point star.

On the south gable end is a low two-story, single-pile kitchen wing featuring a most unusual exterior end chimney with sloped weatherings. The kitchen wing is also stuccoed but it is unscored and has a steeply-sloped, shed-roofed, wraparound porch on the west elevation now covered with corrugated tin.

The windows of the principal block have heavy mortise and tenoned architraves with ovolo moldings, holding nine-over-six pane sashes on the first floor and six-over-six sash on the second floor. Dating back to the 1880s remodeling, the few remaining shutters on the first story feature flat panels framed by applied Grecian ogee moldings against the stiles and rails. The shutters, which are mounted on cast iron pintles screwed to the window jambs, are secured in an open position by wrought iron shutter dogs featuring scrolled rat tails and "penny" terminals.
