= Coomes =

Coomes may refer to:

- Sam Coomes (born 1964), an American musician, and one-half of the Portland-area indie band Quasi, along with drummer and ex-wife Janet Weiss.
- Penny Coomes, an English ice dancer who represents the United Kingdom.

== See also ==
- Coombs (disambiguation)
