= Combe Hill =

Combe Hill may refer to:

- Combe Hill, East Sussex, a causewayed enclosure, near Eastbourne in East Sussex, UK
- Combe Hill, Berkshire, a summit on the North Hampshire Downs in Berkshire, UK
