= Rosemary J. Coombe =

Canadian anthropologist and lawyer

Rosemary Coombe

Academic background
- Education: B.A., 1981, University of Western Ontario; J.S.M., JsD., Stanford University
- Thesis: Cultural appropriations: intellectual property laws and the cultural politics of postmodernism.

Academic work
- Institutions: University of Toronto; York University
- Main interests: Law and Justice, Cultural, political, and social implications of intellectual property laws, Communications and Culture
- Website: rcoombe.blog.yorku.ca

Rosemary J. Coombe is a Canadian anthropologist and lawyer, She is a professor in the Department of Anthropology at York University and Tier 1 Canada Research Chair in Law, Communication and Cultural Studies. Previously, she was a full professor in the Faculty of Law at the University of Toronto.

== Education ==
Coombe earned her J.S.D. from Stanford University.

== Career ==
She was a faculty member at the University of Toronto (U of T) for 12 years before accepting a position at York University in 2001 as their Tier 1 Canada Research Chair in Law, Communication and Cultural Studies. Before leaving U of T, she published "The Cultural Life of Intellectual Properties: Authorship, Appropriation and the Law" through the Duke University Press. Three years later, she accepted an Ida Beam Visiting Professorship from the University of Iowa. Coombe was renewed as a Tier 1 Canada Research Chair (CRC) in Law, Communication and Cultural Studies in 2009.

In 2013, Coombe co-edited "Dynamic Fair Dealing: Creating Canadian Culture Online" through the University of Toronto Press. She was again renewed as a Tier 1 Canada Research Chair in 2016. That year, she was also recognized by York as a Research Leader. Two years later, she was a T. C. Bierne Visiting Fellow at the University of Queensland's TC Beirne School of Law. Coombe is also part of the Intellectual Property Issues in Cultural Heritage research team.

== Selected publications ==
The following is a list of selected publications:

- Intellectual property: casebook (1988)
- Cultural appropriations: authorship, alterity, and the law (1998)
- Copyright law: course materials (1998)
- Cultural appropriations: intellectual property laws and the cultural politics of postmodernism. (1994)
- Copyright, neighbouring rights and moral rights (2000)
- Dynamic Fair Dealing: Creating Canadian Culture Online (2013)

Rosemary J. Coombe has written about many important elements within the realm of intellectual property law. In her writing, Coombe focuses on the social and cultural implications of intellectual property law and its constraints. Coombe has written many articles addressing these topics. For example, Coombe wrote Objects of Property and Subjects of Politics: Intellectual Property Laws and Democratic Dialogue, 69 Tex. L. Rev. 1853 (1991). This article highlighted the relationship between democratic freedoms, copyright concepts, and the subsequent effects that stifle cultural expression.
