= Kömbe =

Type of pastry in Turkish cuisine

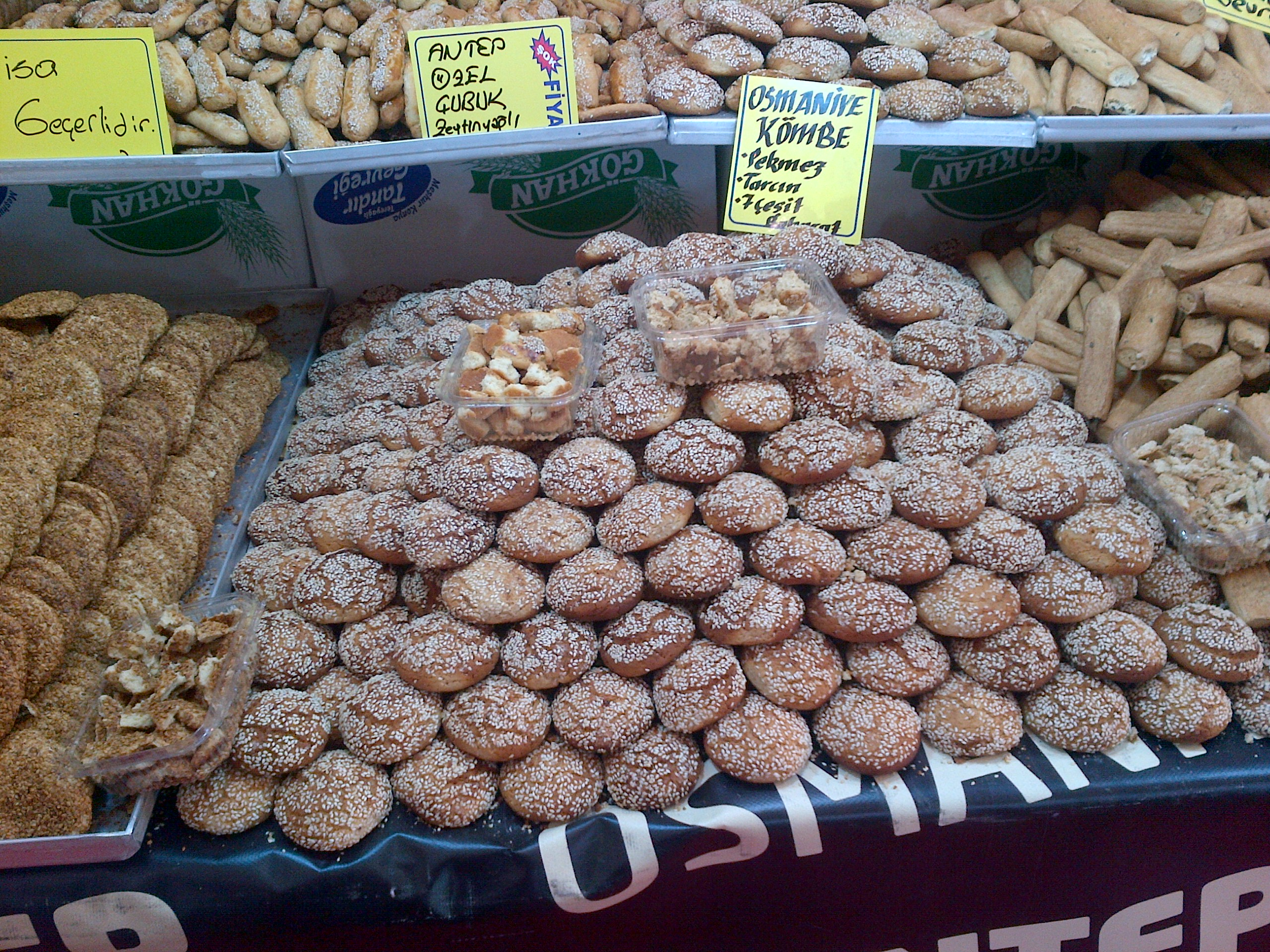
- Region or state: Turkey
- Serving temperature: Hot

Kömbe is a kind of börek from Sivas, Elazig, Malatya, Kahramanmaras, Osmaniye Province Turkey. It exists in Turkish cuisine and is popular among Turkish people.
