= Combe =

Type of valley used in place names

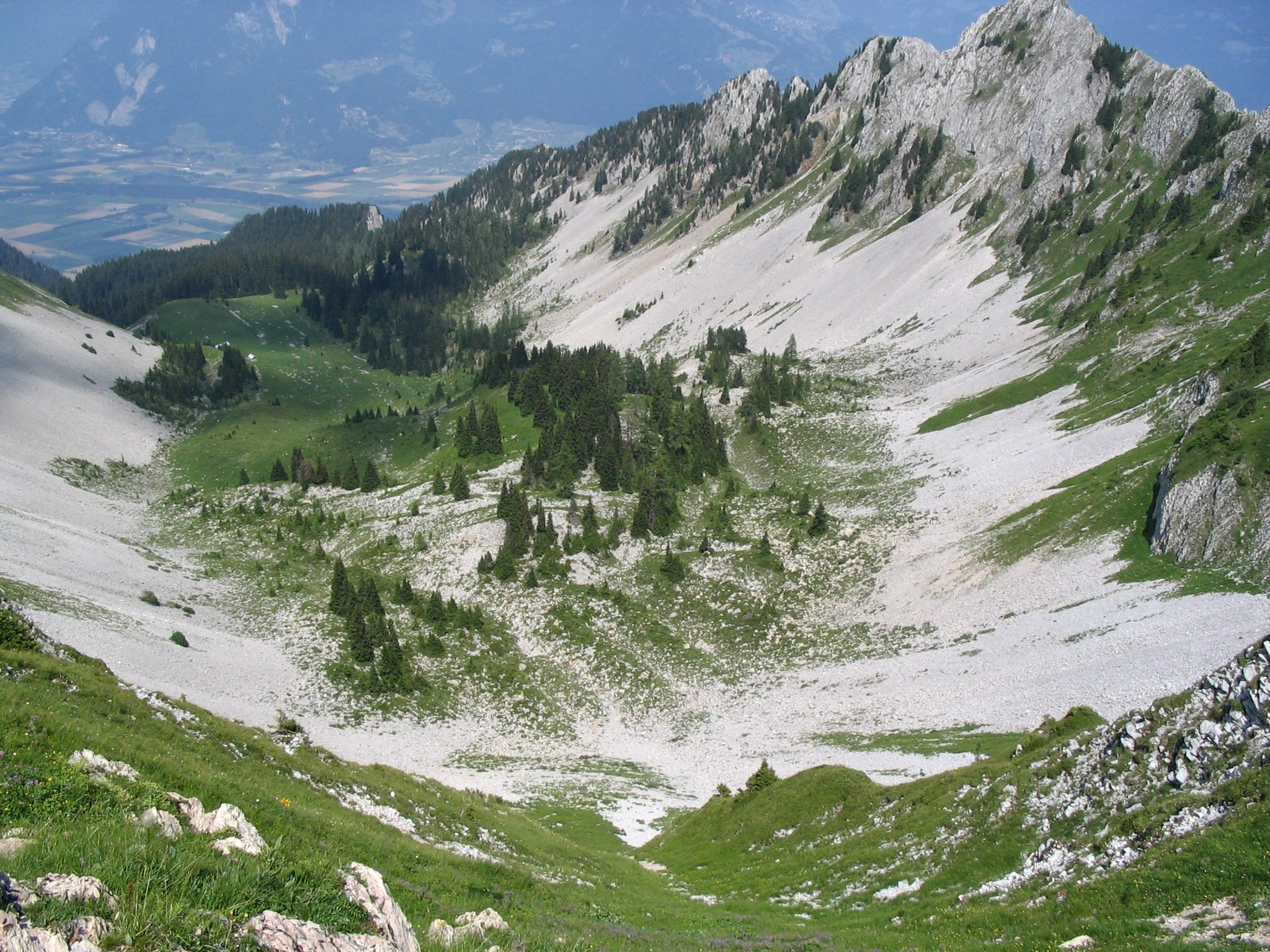
The "Combe de Dreveneuse" in Valais, Switzerland.

A combe (/kuːm/; also spelled coombe or coomb and, in place names, comb) can refer either to a steep, narrow valley, or to a small valley or large hollow on the side of a hill; in any case, it is often understood simply to mean a small valley through which a watercourse does not run.

The word "combe" derives from Old English cumb and is unrelated to the English word "comb". From Middle English coumbe, cumbe, from Old English cumb, ultimately from Proto-Germanic *kumbaz; compare Dutch kom ("bowl, basin"), German Kump ("vessel"). Related to Welsh cwm ("a hollow valley"), of identical meaning, through Proto-Indo-European *ḱumbʰ-.

Today, the word is used mostly in reference to the combes of southern and southwestern England.

== Examples ==
The following is a list places in the British Isles named for having combes:

- Addiscombe, in south London
- Addiscombe, in the London Borough of Croydon
- Alcombe, in Minehead, Somerset
- Allercombe, Devon
- Ansty Coombe, Wiltshire
- Appuldurcombe, on the Isle of Wight
- Ashcombe, Devon
- Ashcombe, Somerset
- Ashcombe, Wiltshire
- Awliscombe, Devon
- Babbacombe, Devon
- Balcombe, West Sussex
- Barcombe, East Sussex
- Barcombe Cross, East Sussex
- Batcombe, Dorset, England (named for Batcombe Down)
- Batcombe, Somerset
- Battlescombe, Gloucestershire
- Batts Combe, Somerset
- Beercrocombe, Somerset
- Bencombe, Gloucestershire
- Bettiscombe, Dorset
- Bincombe, Dorset
- Black Combe, Cumbria
- Bocombe, Devon
- Bodmiscombe, Devon
- Boscombe, Dorset
- Bowcombe, Isle of Wight
- Bramblecombe, Dorset
- Branscombe, Devon
- Brenscombe Heath, Dorset
- Brimscombe, Gloucestershire
- Brockley Combe, North Somerset
- Burcombe, Wiltshire
- Burcombe Down, Wiltshire
- Burlescombe, Devon
- Burrington Combe, North Somerset
- Butcombe, Somerset
- Castle Combe, Wiltshire
- Chacombe, Northamptonshire
- Chaffcombe, Somerset
- Chalcombe, Northamptonshire
- Challacombe, Somerset
- Chambercombe, Devon
- Charlcombe, Somerset
- Chilcombe, Dorset
- Combe, Berkshire
- Combe, Devon
- Combe, Devon
- Combe, Herefordshire
- Combe, Oxfordshire
- Combe Almer, Dorset
- Combe Bottom, Surrey
- Combe Common, Surrey
- Combe Door Top, Glaramara, Cumbria
- Combe Down, Somerset
- Combe Fishacre, Devon
- Combe Florey, Somerset
- Combe Gill, Glaramara, Cumbria
- Combe Haven, East Sussex
- Combe Hay, Somerset
- Combe Head, Glaramara, Cumbria
- Combe Martin, North Devon
- Combe Moor, Herefordshire
- Combe Pafford, Devon
- Combe Raleigh, Devon
- Combe St Nicholas, Somerset
- Combe Sydenham, Somerset
- Combebow, Devon
- Combeinteignhead, Devon
- Combpyne, Devon
- Combwich, Somerset
- Compton, Berkshire
- Compton, Devon
- Compton, Hampshire
- Compton, Isle of Wight
- Compton, Surrey
- Compton, Surrey
- Compton, West Midlands
- Compton, West Sussex
- Compton Abbas, Dorset
- Compton Abdale, Gloucestershire
- Compton Bassett, Wiltshire
- Compton Beauchamp, Oxfordshire
- Compton Bishop, Somerset
- Compton Dando
- Compton Dundon
- Compton Greenfield
- Compton Martin
- Compton Pauncefoot
- Compton Valence
- Coombe Bissett
- Coombe Dingle, Bristol
- Coombe Fields
- Coombe Hill
- Coombe Hill, a flank of Haddington Hill
- Coombe Hill, Buckinghamshire
- Coombe Hill, East Sussex
- Coombe Hill (Cotswolds), Gloucestershire
- Coombe Hill, Tewkesbury, Gloucestershire
- Coombe Keynes
- Coombe, Buckinghamshire
- Coombe, Bude
- Coombe, Camborne
- Coombe, Cornwall
- Coombe, Croydon
- Coombe, Devon
- Coombe, Gloucestershire
- Coombe, Hampshire
- Coombe, Kent
- Coombe, Kingston upon Thames
- Coombe, Liskeard
- Coombe, London
- Coombe, Redruth
- Coombe, Sidmouth, Devon
- Coombe, Somerset
- Coombe, St Austell
- Coombe, Taunton, Somerset
- Coombe, Teignmouth, Devon
- Coombe, Tiverton, Devon
- Coombe, Truro
- Coombe, Wiltshire
- Coombes
- Corscombe
- Croscombe
- Crowcombe
- Cutcombe
- Danescombe, Cornwall
- Doccombe, Devon
- Drascombe
- Drizzlecombe
- Eastcombe, Gloucestershire
- Eastcombe, Mendip, Somerset
- Eastcombe, Taunton Deane, Somerset
- Ellacombe
- Ellacombe, Devon
- Englishcombe
- Faccombe
- Farncombe
- Flexcombe
- Fordcombe
- Gatcombe
- Gatcombe Park
- Goblin Combe
- Halecombe
- Harptree Combe
- Hascombe
- Hascombe Hill
- Hawkcombe Woods
- Hestercombe House
- High Wycombe
- Higher Melcombe
- Holcombe Rogus
- Holcombe, Devon
- Holcombe, East Devon
- Holcombe, Greater Manchester
- Holcombe, Somerset
- Holcombe, Teignbridge
- Hollycombe
- Huntercombe
- Huntercombe, Slough
- Ilfracombe
- Letcombe
- Luccombe, Isle of Wight
- Luccombe, Somerset
- Luscombe Castle
- Maidencombe, Devon
- Maplescombe
- Melcombe Regis
- Milcombe
- Milton Combe
- Monkton Combe
- Motcombe
- Moulsecoomb
- Nether Compton
- Nettlecombe
- Nettlecombe Court
- Nettlecombe, Isle of Wight
- Nettlecombe, Somerset
- Occombe Valley Woods
- Odcombe
- Oddicombe Beach
- Orcombe Point
- Overcombe
- Over Compton
- Parracombe
- Pencombe
- Peppercombe Castle
- Picklecombe Fort
- Pincombe Down
- Pitcombe
- Pitcombe Down
- Postcombe
- Prescombe Down
- Prior's Park & Adcombe Wood
- Pyecombe
- Ranscombe Farm, Medway
- Riddlecombe
- River Swincombe
- Ruscombe
- Saddlescombe
- Salcombe
- Salcombe Castle
- Salcombe Regis
- Seacombe
- Sedlescombe
- Shalcombe
- Sheepscombe
- Shoscombe
- Slewton Combe
- Smallcombe
- Snorscombe
- Stinchcombe
- Swanscombe
- Swyncombe
- Telscombe
- Templecombe
- The Coombe, Dublin
- The Coombes, Hinton Parva
- Thorncombe
- Timberscombe
- Totcombe, Dorset
- Uggescombe (hundred)
- Ulcombe
- Upton Coombe
- Warcombe Farm
- Welcombe
- West Wycombe
- Westcombe
- Westcombe Park
- West Compton
- Whitcombe, Dorset
- Widcombe, Bath
- Widdecombe
- Widecombe-in-the-Moor
- Winchcombe
- Winscombe
- Witcombe
- Withycombe
- Wiveliscombe
- Woolacombe
- Wycombe
- Yarcombe
- Yarnscombe
