= List of United Kingdom locations: Bas-Baz =

The United Kingdom

This is part of the list of United Kingdom locations: a gazetteer of place names in the United Kingdom showing each place's locality and geographical coordinates.

== Ba (continued) ==
=== Bas-Baz ===
Location	Locality	Coordinates (links to map & photo sources)	OS grid reference
Baschurch	Shropshire	52.78°N 02.86°W	SJ4221
Bascote	Warwickshire	52.26°N 01.41°W	SP4063
Bascote Heath	Warwickshire	52.25°N 01.43°W	SP3962
Base Green	Suffolk	52.22°N 00.94°E	TM0163
Basford	Shropshire	52.45°N 02.89°W	SO3985
Basford	Staffordshire	53.01°N 02.22°W	SJ8546
Basford Green	Staffordshire	53.05°N 02.01°W	SJ9951
Bashall Eaves	Lancashire	53.88°N 02.47°W	SD6943
Bashley	Hampshire	50.77°N 01.66°W	SZ2497
Bashley Park	Hampshire	50.77°N 01.66°W	SZ2497
Basildon	Essex	51.57°N 00.49°E	TQ7389
Basingstoke	Hampshire	51.26°N 01.09°W	SU6352
Baslow	Derbyshire	53.24°N 01.62°W	SK2572
Bason Bridge	Somerset	51.20°N 02.94°W	ST3445
Bassaleg	City of Newport	51.56°N 03.05°W	ST2786
Bassenthwaite	Cumbria	54.67°N 03.19°W	NY2332
Bassett	City of Southampton	50.94°N 01.41°W	SU4116
Bassett	Sheffield	53.35°N 01.58°W	SK2884
Bassett Green	City of Southampton	50.94°N 01.40°W	SU4216
Bassingbourn	Cambridgeshire	52.06°N 00.06°W	TL3343
Bassingfield	Nottinghamshire	52.92°N 01.07°W	SK6237
Bassingham	Lincolnshire	53.12°N 00.64°W	SK9159
Bassingthorpe	Lincolnshire	52.84°N 00.57°W	SK9628
Bassus Green	Hertfordshire	51.90°N 00.11°W	TL3025
Basta	Shetland Islands	60.62°N 01.05°W	HU5294
Basted	Kent	51.27°N 00.29°E	TQ6055
Baston	Lincolnshire	52.71°N 00.35°W	TF1114
Bastonford	Worcestershire	52.14°N 02.27°W	SO8150
Bastwick	Norfolk	52.69°N 01.58°E	TG4217
Baswich	Staffordshire	52.79°N 02.09°W	SJ9422
Batch	Somerset	51.29°N 02.97°W	ST3255
Batchcott	Herefordshire	52.32°N 02.74°W	SO4970
Batchfields	Herefordshire	52.13°N 02.51°W	SO6549
Batchley	Worcestershire	52.30°N 01.97°W	SP0267
Batchworth	Hertfordshire	51.63°N 00.46°W	TQ0694
Batchworth Heath	Hertfordshire	51.61°N 00.45°W	TQ0792
Batcombe	Somerset	51.14°N 02.44°W	ST6939
Batcombe	Dorset	50.83°N 02.55°W	ST6104
Bate Heath	Cheshire	53.30°N 02.48°W	SJ6879
Bateman's Green	Worcestershire	52.38°N 01.89°W	SP0776
Bateman's Hill	Pembrokeshire	51.69°N 04.88°W	SN0104
Batemoor	South Yorkshire	53.31°N 01.47°W	SK3580
Batford	Hertfordshire	51.82°N 00.34°W	TL1415
Bath	Bath and North East Somerset	51.37°N 02.37°W	ST7464
Bathampton	Bath and North East Somerset	51.39°N 02.33°W	ST7766
Bathealton	Somerset	51.00°N 03.32°W	ST0724
Batheaston	Bath and North East Somerset	51.40°N 02.31°W	ST7867
Bathford	Bath and North East Somerset	51.39°N 02.30°W	ST7966
Bathgate	West Lothian	55.90°N 03.64°W	NS9769
Bathley	Nottinghamshire	53.12°N 00.85°W	SK7759
Bathpool	Somerset	51.02°N 03.07°W	ST2526
Bathpool	Cornwall	50.54°N 04.42°W	SX2874
Bath Side	Essex	51.94°N 01.27°E	TM2532
Bath Vale	Cheshire	53.16°N 02.19°W	SJ8763
Bathville	West Lothian	55.88°N 03.71°W	NS9367
Bathway	Somerset	51.26°N 02.58°W	ST5952
Bathwick	Bath and North East Somerset	51.38°N 02.36°W	ST7565
Batlers Green	Hertfordshire	51.66°N 00.33°W	TQ1598
Batley	Kirklees	53.71°N 01.63°W	SE2424
Batley Carr	Kirklees -	53.70°N 01.65°W	SE2323
Batsford	Gloucestershire	51.99°N 01.73°W	SP1833
Batson	Devon	50.23°N 03.78°W	SX7339
Batsworthy	Devon	50.95°N 03.68°W	SS8219
Batten's Green	Somerset	50.95°N 03.01°W	ST2918
Battenton Green	Worcestershire	52.28°N 02.25°W	SO8365
Battersby	North Yorkshire	54.45°N 01.09°W	NZ5907
Battersea	Wandsworth	51.46°N 00.15°W	TQ2876
Battisford	Suffolk	52.14°N 00.99°E	TM0554
Battisford Tye	Suffolk	52.14°N 00.95°E	TM0254
Battle	East Sussex	50.91°N 00.47°E	TQ7416
Battle	Powys	51.95°N 03.45°W	SO0030
Battledown	Gloucestershire	51.88°N 02.05°W	SO9621
Battledown Cross	Devon	50.85°N 04.20°W	SS4509
Battlefield	Shropshire	52.73°N 02.72°W	SJ5116
Battlefield	City of Glasgow	55.82°N 04.26°W	NS5861
Battle Hill	North Tyneside	55.00°N 01.53°W	NZ3068
Battlesbridge	Essex	51.61°N 00.55°E	TQ7794
Battlescombe	Gloucestershire	51.75°N 02.13°W	SO9106
Battlesden	Bedfordshire	51.94°N 00.60°W	SP9628
Battlesea Green	Suffolk	52.32°N 01.25°E	TM2275
Battleton	Somerset	51.03°N 03.55°W	SS9127
Battlies Green	Suffolk	52.24°N 00.76°E	TL8964
Battram	Leicestershire	52.67°N 01.38°W	SK4209
Battramsley	Hampshire	50.78°N 01.57°W	SZ3099
Battramsley Cross	Hampshire	50.78°N 01.56°W	SZ3198
Batt's Corner	Hampshire	51.16°N 00.84°W	SU8141
Battyeford	Kirklees	53.67°N 01.71°W	SE1920
Batworthy	Devon	50.65°N 03.82°W	SX7185
Baugh	Argyll and Bute	56.48°N 06.84°W	NM0243
Baughton	Worcestershire	52.06°N 02.19°W	SO8741
Baughurst	Hampshire	51.33°N 01.16°W	SU5860
Baulking	Oxfordshire	51.60°N 01.55°W	SU3190
Baumber	Lincolnshire	53.24°N 00.18°W	TF2174
Baunton	Gloucestershire	51.73°N 01.97°W	SP0204
Baverstock	Wiltshire	51.07°N 01.97°W	SU0231
Bawburgh	Norfolk	52.62°N 01.17°E	TG1508
Bawdeswell	Norfolk	52.73°N 01.02°E	TG0420
Bawdrip	Somerset	51.14°N 02.94°W	ST3439
Bawdsey	Suffolk	52.00°N 01.40°E	TM3440
Bawsey	Norfolk	52.74°N 00.48°E	TF6819
Bawtry	Doncaster	53.43°N 01.02°W	SK6593
Baxenden	Lancashire	53.73°N 02.35°W	SD7726
Baxterley	Warwickshire	52.57°N 01.60°W	SP2797
Baxter's Green	Suffolk	52.19°N 00.55°E	TL7558
Bay	Dorset	51.03°N 02.27°W	ST8126
Bay	Highland	57.48°N 06.57°W	NG2653
Baybridge	Hampshire	51.00°N 01.26°W	SU5223
Baybridge	Northumberland	54.84°N 02.07°W	NY9550
Baycliff	Cumbria	54.13°N 03.10°W	SD2872
Baydon	Wiltshire	51.49°N 01.59°W	SU2877
Bayford	Somerset	51.05°N 02.40°W	ST7229
Bayford	Hertfordshire	51.75°N 00.11°W	TL3008
Bay Gate	Lancashire	53.93°N 02.38°W	SD7549
Bayhead (North Uist)	Western Isles	57.58°N 07.45°W	NF7468
Bayhead (Harris)	Western Isles	57.75°N 06.94°W	NG0685
Bayherivagh	Western Isles	56.99°N 07.43°W	NF7002
Bay Horse	Lancashire	53.97°N 02.77°W	SD4953
Bayles	Cumbria	54.79°N 02.46°W	NY7044
Bayley's Hill	Kent	51.23°N 00.16°E	TQ5151
Baylham	Suffolk	52.11°N 01.06°E	TM1051
Baylis Green	Worcestershire	52.32°N 01.88°W	SP0870
Baynard's Green	Oxfordshire	51.95°N 01.21°W	SP5429
Baynhall	Worcestershire	52.12°N 02.22°W	SO8547
Baysham	Herefordshire	51.94°N 02.62°W	SO5727
Bayston Hill	Shropshire	52.66°N 02.78°W	SJ4708
Bayswater	Royal Borough of Kensington and Chelsea	51.50°N 00.20°W	TQ2580
Baythorne End	Essex	52.04°N 00.50°E	TL7242
Baythorpe	Lincolnshire	52.95°N 00.15°W	TF2441
Bayton	Worcestershire	52.35°N 02.45°W	SO6973
Bayton Common	Worcestershire	52.34°N 02.42°W	SO7172
Bay View	Kent	51.39°N 00.88°E	TR0170
Bayworth	Oxfordshire	51.70°N 01.27°W	SP5001
