= Combe, Devon =

Combe, Devon may refer to various places in Devon, England:

- Combe, Buckfastleigh, Devon
- Combe, Yealmpton, Devon
- Combe Fishacre
- Combe Martin
- Combe Pafford
- Combe Raleigh

== See also ==
- Coombe, Devon (disambiguation)
