= Royal Forestry Society =

British charity

- Abbreviation: RFS
- Formation: 1882
- Founder: Henry Clark, John W Robson
- Founded at: Northumberland
- Type: Registered charity
- Purpose: Woodland management
- Headquarters: Banbury, Oxfordshire
- Region served: England, Wales, Northern Ireland
- Main organ: The Quarterly Journal of Forestry (QJF)
- Website: www.rfs.org.uk
- Formerly called: English Arboricultural Society

The Royal Forestry Society (RFS) is an educational charity and one of the oldest membership organisations in England, Wales and Northern Ireland for those actively involved in woodland management.

The RFS has a broad membership which includes woodland owners, managers, countryside professionals (land agents, ecologists, conservationists), academics, students and others with a general interest in woodland management. Membership is open to all.

== History ==
The Royal Forestry Society was established in 1882 in Northumberland, England. Originally known as the English Arboricultural Society, the organisation was founded by forester Henry Clark and nurseryman John W Robson, both from Hexham. The Society's first President was John Lambton, 1st Earl of Durham. In 1905 it was granted a Royal Charter by King Edward VII and was renamed the Royal English Arboricultural Society. It was renamed The Royal English Forestry Society in 1931, and in 1962 its title was changed to the Royal Forestry Society of England, Wales and Northern Ireland.

A separate organisation operates in Scotland, the Royal Scottish Forestry Society, which was established in 1854.

== Woodlands ==
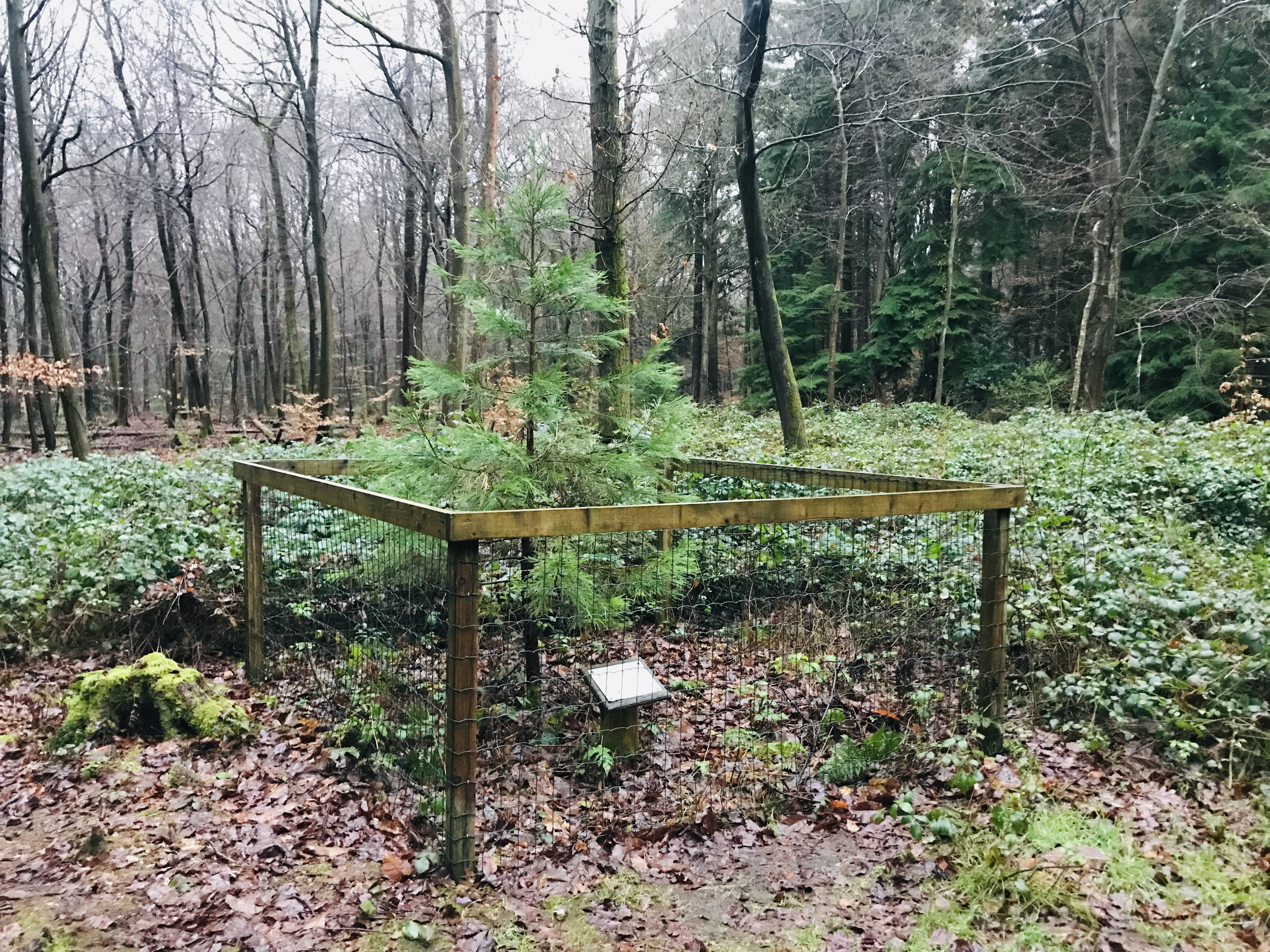
A Wellingtonia (Sequoiadendron giganteum) sapling, planted in Hockeridge Woods in 2015 by Mary Wellesley, great-great-granddaughter of the Duke of Wellington, to commemorate the 200th anniversary of the Battle of Waterloo

Although the Society is not a major woodland owner, it manages three working woodlands:

- Hockeridge and Pancake Woods in the Chilterns, on the Hertfordshire/Buckinghamshire border and close to Berkhamsted and Chesham, gifted to the RFS in 1986 by Mary Wellesley, great-great-granddaughter of the Duke of Wellington;
- a 50-hectare (0.50 km^{2}) woodland in the National Forest, close to Battram in Leicestershire;
- Charles Ackers Redwood Grove and Naylor Pinetum at Leighton Hall, Powys near Welshpool, Powys, the largest and oldest grove of coast redwoods in Europe.

These are managed as examples of good practice and lessons learned are shared with members.

Map of RFS managed woodlands in the UK

== Activities ==
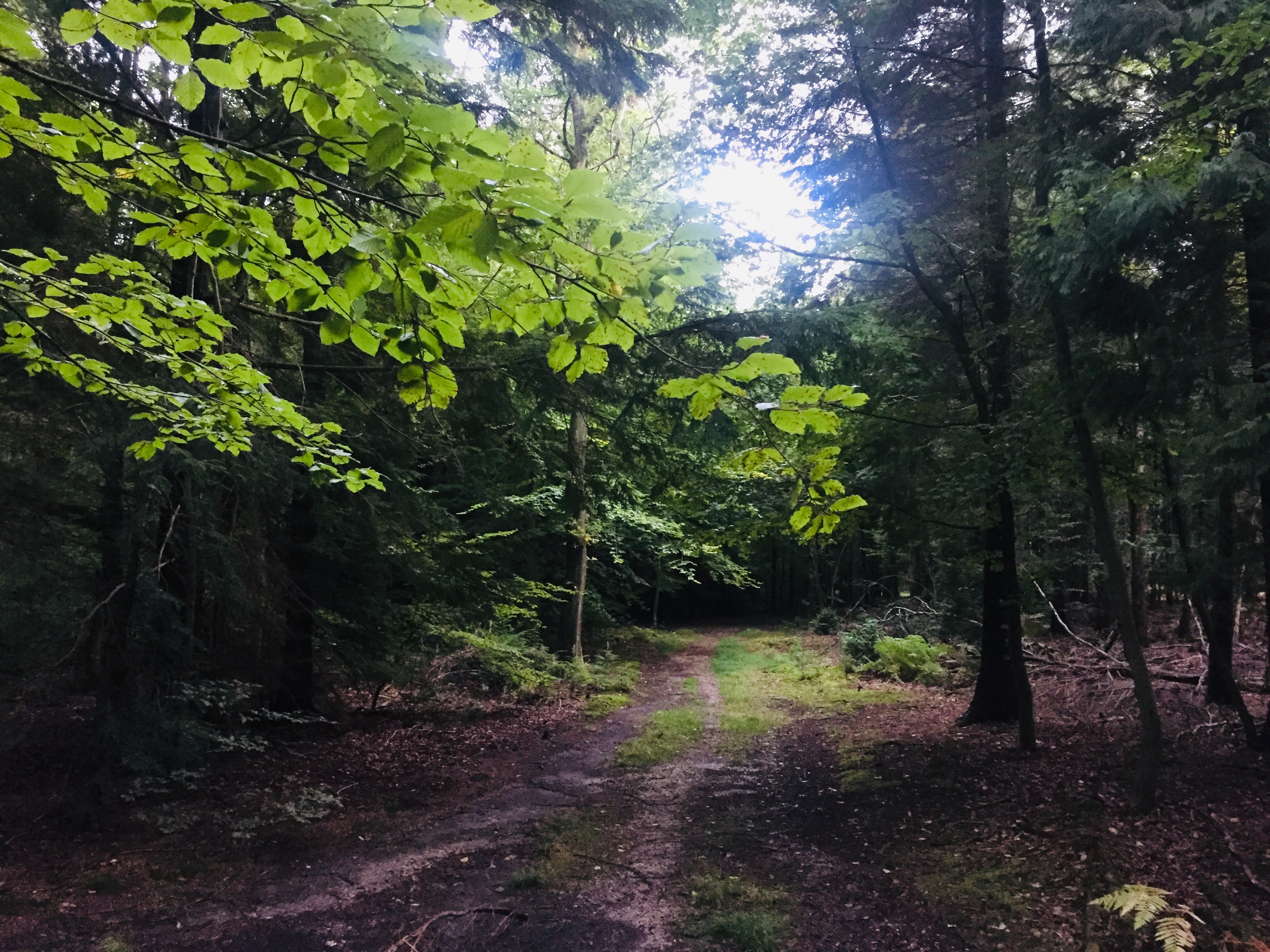
Hockeridge Woods in early autumn

The Society has 20 Divisions which between them organise up to 100 woodland field meetings a year on topics that span seed to sawmill. Annually: a top-level conference is held; there is a 4 or 5 day woodland study tour in England, Wales or Northern Ireland; Excellence in Forestry Awards take place, there is a travel bursary for forestry study abroad, and workshops, seminars and knowledge transfer events. Overseas study tours are held every other year.

The RFS helps shape formal forestry qualifications and its own Certificate of Arboriculture is recognised across the sector; it encourages students with a range of awards, bursaries and internships; has launched a research programme with colleges and has partnered with a number of organisations to help share knowledge. A professional qualification is offered by the RFS, the Professional Diploma of Arboriculture. The RFS Teaching Trees project is expanding, introducing primary schools and their pupils to their local woodlands and their benefits to the economy, environment and society.

The RFS maintains a library of forestry related books for members.

The society is headquartered in the grounds of Upton House, Warwickshire, near Banbury.

=== Journal ===
The primary publication of The Royal Forestry Society is the Quarterly Journal of Forestry (since 1907).

== Arms ==
Coat of arms of Royal Forestry Society
Notes Granted 20 November 1963 Crest On a wreath Argent and Vert, in front of an oak sapling leaved and fructed, a woodman's axe and a spade, handles upward, in saltire Proper, all enfiled of an annulet Or. Escutcheon Per fess Tenne and Argent, a pale counterchanged, in chief between two fir trees Proper a rose Gules surmounted of a rose Argent barbed and seeded, and in base a fir tree between a daffodil flower and a flax flower Proper. Supporters On either side a lion guardant Vert, gorged with an ancient coronet Or, supporting an oak sapling leaved and fructed Proper.
