= Nettlecombe =

Nettlecombe may refer to:

- Nettlecombe, Dorset
- Nettlecombe, Isle of Wight
- Nettlecombe, Somerset
