= Coombe, Devon =

Coombe, Devon may refer to various places in Devon, England:

- Coombe, East Devon
- Coombe, Tiverton, Devon
- Coombe, Teignmouth, Devon

See also:

- Combe, Devon (disambiguation)
