= Batcombe =

Batcombe may refer to:

- Batcombe, Dorset, England
- Batcombe, Somerset, England
