= Goodleigh, Mid Devon =

Village in Devon, England

Goodleigh
- Village
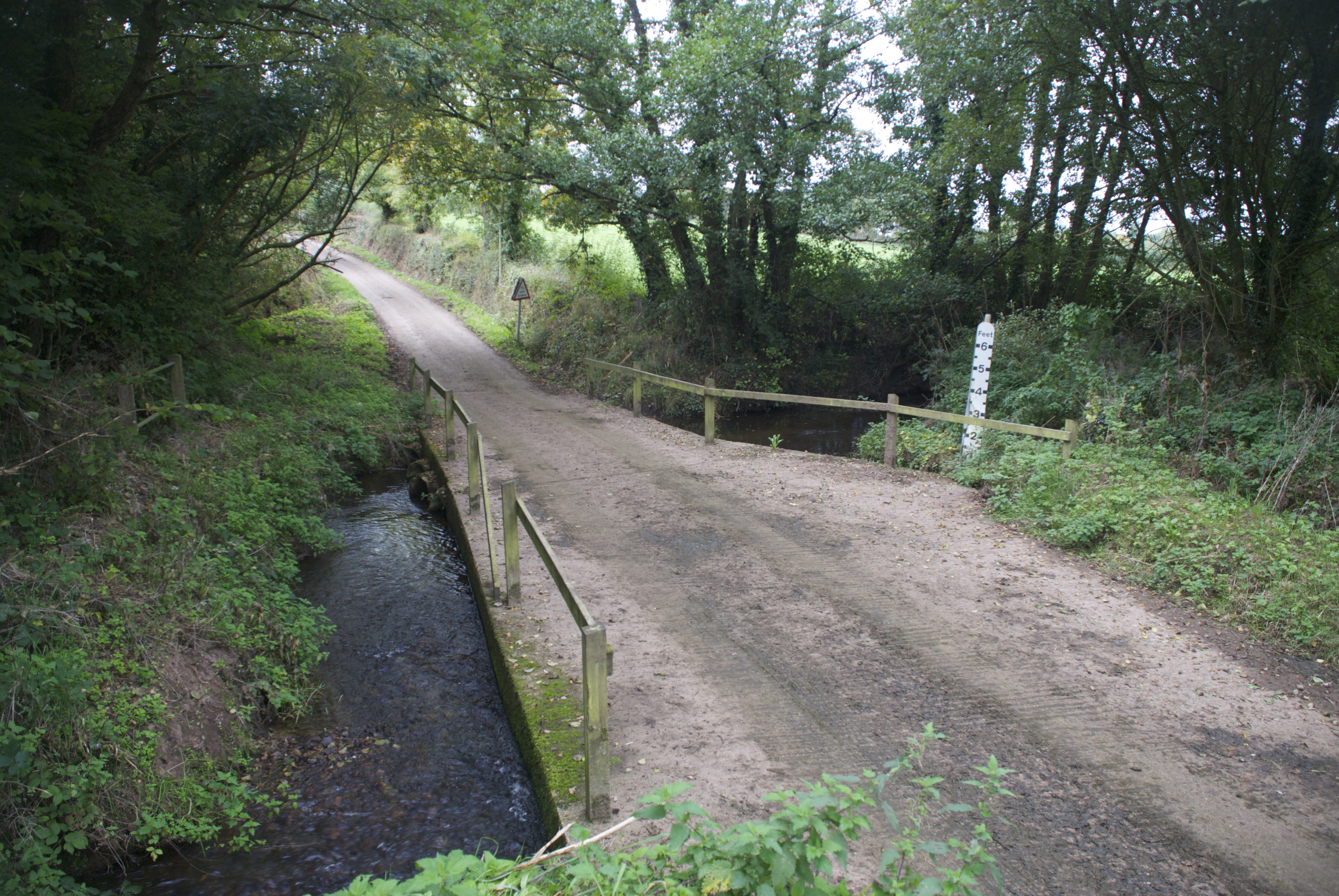
- The ford at Goodleigh

- Location within Devon Location within the United Kingdom
- Coordinates: 50°53′12″N 3°15′30″W
- Country: England
- County: Devon
- District: Mid Devon
- Time zone: UTC+0:00 (GST)

Goodleigh is a village about 1 km northeast of Bodmiscombe in the county of Devon, England.

The origin of the place-name is from the Old English words Goda and leah meaning a woodland clearing of a man named Goda.
