= Huntercombe (disambiguation) =

Huntercombe may refer to:

- Huntercombe, Slough, an area between Cippenham and Slough in Berkshire, England
- Huntercombe (HM Prison), an adult male category C prison located near Nuffield in Oxfordshire, England
- The Huntercombe Group, a United Kingdom-based private hospital and clinic provider
- Walter de Huntercombe, 1st Baron Huntercombe (1247 - 1313), English military commander
