= Smallacombe =

Smallacombe is a surname. Notable people with the surname include:

- Gordon Smallacombe (1907–1957), Canadian long jumper, triple jumper, and high jumper
- Patrea Smallacombe (born 1961), Australian writer
- Penny Smallacombe, Head of Indigenous at Screen Australia

== See also ==
- Smallcombe, a surname from south-west England
