= Burcombe Down =

Grassland in Wiltshire, England

Coordinates: 51.06480°N 1.91004°W

Burcombe Down (grid reference SU064295) is an area of chalk grassland situated on a north-facing scarp slope to the south of Burcombe in Wiltshire, England. Because of its species-rich plant communities, an area of 47.1 hectares (116 acres) of the Down has been notified as a biological Site of Special Scientific Interest, notification originally taking place in 1971.

== Sources ==
- Natural England citation sheet for the site (accessed 22 March 2022)
