= Beggearn Huish =

Hamlet in Somerset, England

Coordinates: 51.147744°N 3.3670390°W

- Hamlet
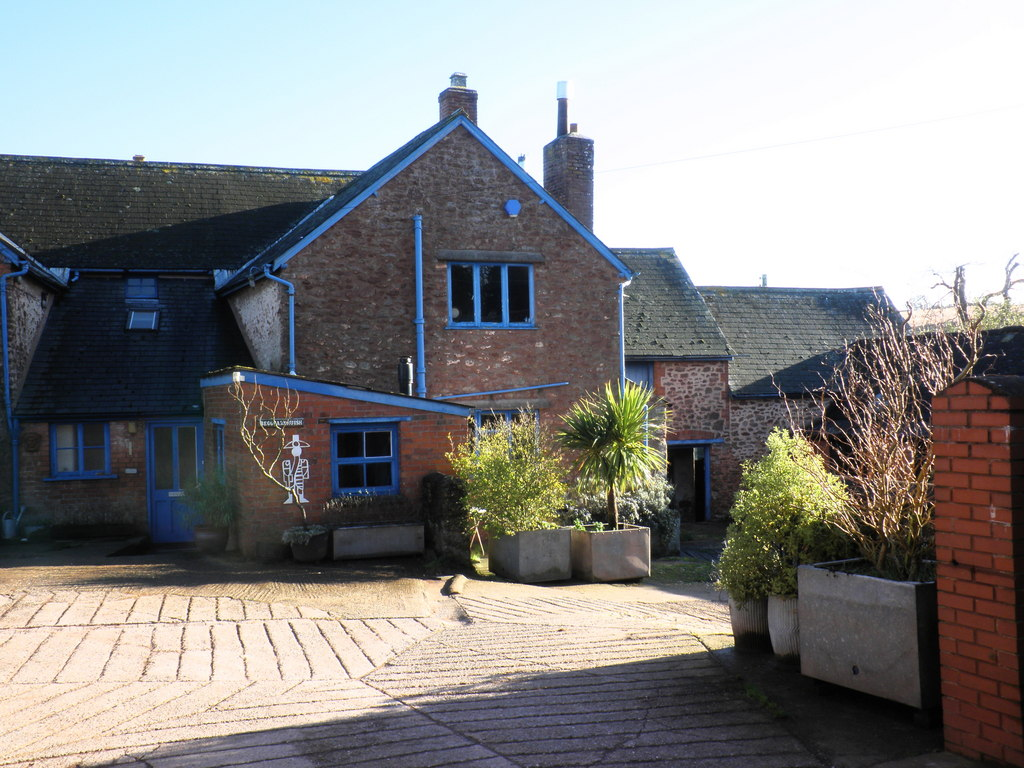
- Beggearn Huish farm

- Location within Somerset
- OS grid reference: ST0447639609
- Civil parish: Nettlecombe
- Unitary authority: Somerset
- Ceremonial county: Somerset
- Region: South West
- Country: England
- Sovereign state: United Kingdom
- Post town: Taunton
- Postcode district: TA4
- Dialling code: 01984
- Police: Avon and Somerset
- Fire: Devon and Somerset
- Ambulance: South Western
- UK Parliament: Tiverton and Minehead

Beggearn Huish is a small hamlet in the civil parish of Nettlecombe, in Somerset, England.

== History ==
There was a mill at Beggearn Huish in 1086, but the location is unknown and no later reference exists. The settlement was previously known only as Huish, and was held in 1066 by Mærleswein, a Yorkshire thegn, according to the Domesday Book.

The name Beggearn Huish is of uncertain etymology. It has been recorded as Huish and Beggerhywys. It is possibly related to the Middle English word beggere or beggare, and could have referred to the poor quality of the land.

From 1974 to 2019 it was in the West Somerset district. From 2019 to 2023 it was in the Somerset West and Taunton district, and since 2023 it is part of Somerset district.
