= Church of St Mary the Virgin, Nettlecombe =

Church in Somerset, England

Church of St Mary the Virgin
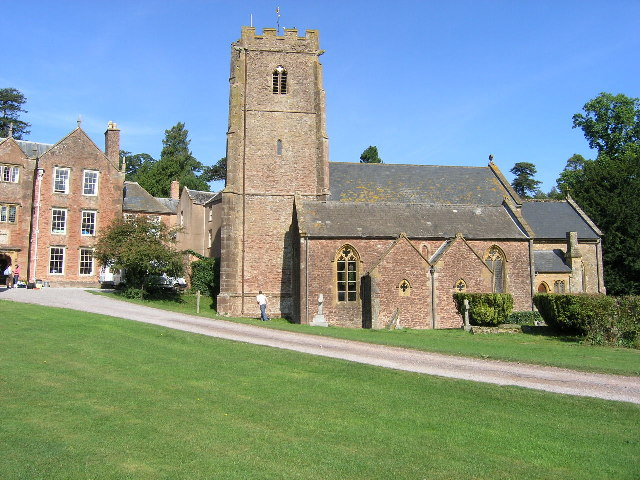

- Location within Somerset

General information
- Location: Nettlecombe, England
- Coordinates: 51.1289°N 3.3518°W
- Completed: 14th century

The Church of St Mary the Virgin in Nettlecombe, Somerset, England dates from the 13th and 14th centuries, and has been designated as a Grade I listed building.

The church which lies within the grounds of Nettlecombe Court, which was built as a large country manor house, becoming a girls' boarding school in the early 1960s and since 1967 has been the Leonard Wills Field Centre run by the Field Studies Council. The house is surrounded by Nettlecombe Park, a 90.4 hectares (223 acres) Site of Special Scientific Interest (SSSI). The house and park are set in a secluded valley on the northern fringes of the Brendon Hills, within the Exmoor National Park.

Although there was a previous church in the village the current red sandstone building was dedicated in 1440. The chancel includes a north chapel and south organ chamber. The nave has a clerestory with north and south aisles, north porch, and west tower. Restoration work was carried out around 1820 by Richard Carver, with further work undertaken between 1858 and 1870 by Charles Edmund Giles.

Within the church is a seven sided font with the sacraments of the church and Christ in Glory carved into each of the faces.

The parish is within the Quantock Towers benefice which is part of the Quantock deanery.

== See also ==
- Grade I listed buildings in West Somerset
- List of Somerset towers
- List of ecclesiastical parishes in the Diocese of Bath and Wells
