= Nettlecombe Court =

Country house in Somerset, England

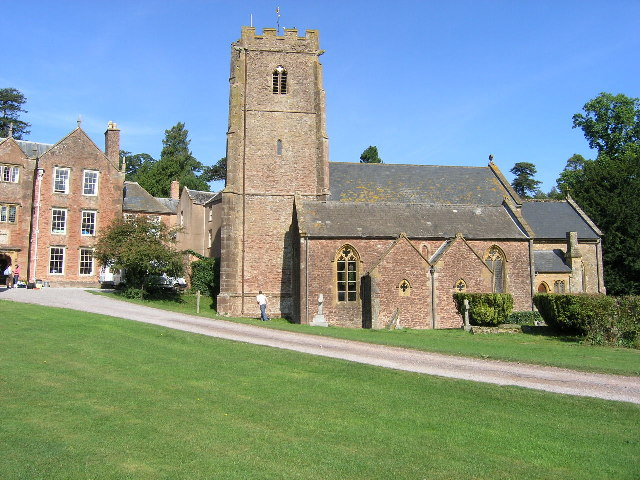
- Nettlecombe Court Field Centre and the Church of St Mary the Virgin

- Location within Somerset

General information
- Location: Williton, England
- Coordinates: 51.131°N 3.35°W

Nettlecombe Court and park is an old estate on the northern fringes of the Brendon Hills, within the Exmoor National Park. They are within the civil parish of Nettlecombe, named after the house, and are approximately 3.6 miles (5.8 km) from the village of Williton, in the English county of Somerset. It has been designated by English Heritage as a Grade I listed building.

The 16th-century Elizabethan, Tudor and Medieval architecture with Georgian refinements includes a mansion, Medieval hall, church, monumental oak grove, and a farm. It is surrounded by 60 hectares (150 acres) of estate parkland situated within the Exmoor National Park, once a part of the estate. It lays sheltered at the northeast incline of the Brendon Hills. The park surrounding the house is Grade II listed on the National Register of Historic Parks and Gardens.

Nettlecombe Park blends into woodlands, with the house serving as the Leonard Wills Field Centre for field scientists who wish to study the surrounding natural environment, which is the best example of this type of ecosystem remaining in England. Today, nearby hills and woodlands, including Exmoor National Park, have provided opportunities for general scientific introductory field courses on environmental themes and botany. Habitats include marine, freshwater and heather moorland and the surrounding settlements range from hamlets to villages to the country town of Taunton. An archaeological excavation on the edge of the property, near the sea coast, has revealed the remains of Danish Vikings who were defeated there circa 900.

== History ==
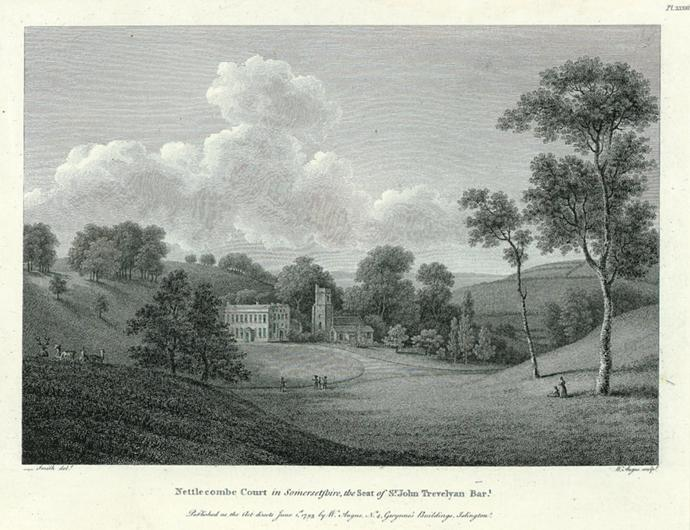
Nettlecombe Court in Somersetshire (1793). Engraved by W. Angus, after a picture by Smith.

Nettlecombe was originally spelled Netelcumbe and by 1245 Nettelcumbe meaning the place or valley where the nettles grow.

Nettlecombe has never been bought or sold. It was held before the Norman Conquest by Prince Godwine, son of King Harold. William the Conqueror assumed possession of Nettlecombe after defeating King Harold at the Battle of Hastings. In 1160, Henry II granted it to Hugh de Raleigh, and to his heirs in perpetuity. It passed to Warine de Raleigh, and on through direct blood heirs until the nineteenth century, a claim strengthened by marriages between deep ancestral cousins. The estate became a seat of the Trevelyan baronets (previously spelled as Trevilian), who also held another manor at Basil, by the marriage of Sir John Trevilian in 1481 to Lady Whalesborough, heiress of Nettlecombe via her Raleigh maternal line. Nettlecombe was held in continuity by Trevilian successors until the 20th century following the death of Joan Trevelyan and her husband Garnet Wolsey.

It became a boarding school for girls (St. Audries Junior School) in the late 1950s. Since 1967 it has been the home of the Leonard Wills Field Centre run by the Field Studies Council an educational charity. The house is surrounded by Nettlecombe Park, a 90.4 hectares (223 acres) Site of Special Scientific Interest (SSSI).

== House ==
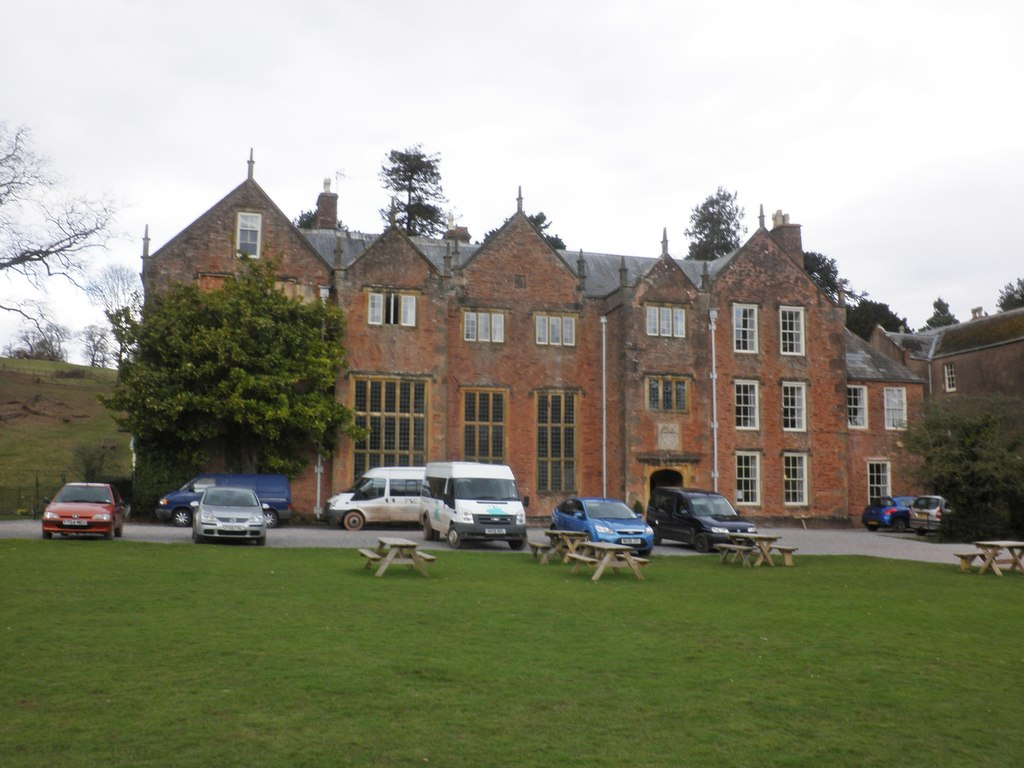
Nettlecombe Court Field Studies Centre

Nettlecombe Court is an Elizabethan country mansion, in addition to earlier-built structures including a late Medieval hall, entrance front, porch, a great hall, and church. A Tudor parlour was added in 1599. In the 1640s there were further additions to the rear of the great hall following a fire started by roundheads opposed to George Trevelyns support of the monarchy during the English Civil War.

During the reign of George I, between 1703 and 1707, the South West front was extended. The south west wing was decorated in the 1780s and the north east service range was added in the early 19th century. The house contains plaster work from each of these eras.

In the seventeenth century, an organ built by John Loosemore was installed, at a cost of £100. This was converted from a single-manual to two-manual operation in the 1830s. In the 1980s, this was partly dismantled and the original parts removed to the John Loosemore Centre in Buckfastleigh, where they are still located, awaiting restoration.

== Family ==
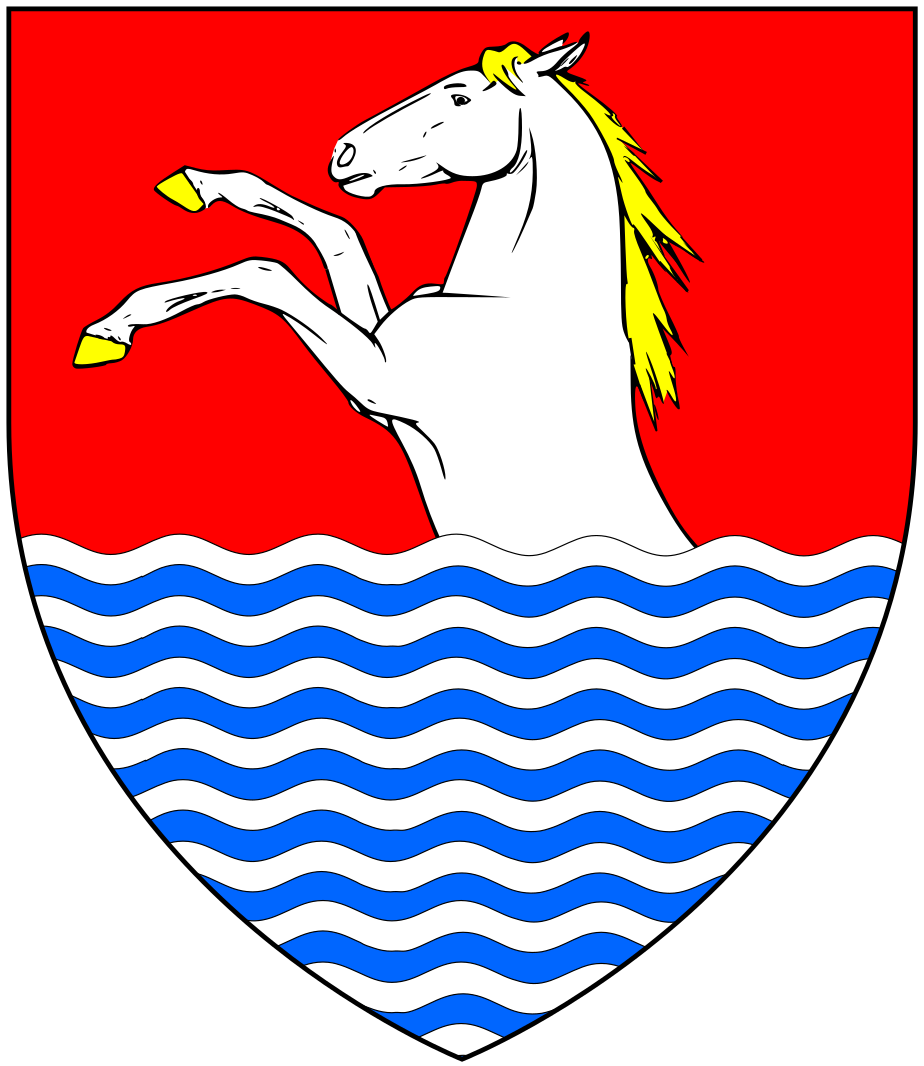
Arms of Trevelyan: Gules, the base barry wavy argent and azure a demi-horse issuant of the second maned and hoofed or

R. J. E. Bush in his Nettlecombe Court says,"Nettlecombe is first mentioned in the Domesday book of 1086, when it was stated to be held by William the Conqueror, and in the charge of his Sheriff for Somerset, William de Mohun." A family lineage published in Nettlecombe Court shows that the estate passed into the Trevelyan family in 1452, upon the marriage of heiress Elizabeth Whalesburgh to a knight companion of the king: Sir John Trevilian, Esquire of the Kynge's Body to Henry VI, Gentleman Usher of the King's Chamber. He also served as a Member of Parliament representing Somerset and as High Sheriff of Cornwall. In the 17th century, the spelling of Trevilian became variably spelt as Trevelyan.

== Intellectual salon ==
In the 19th century, Lady Trevelyan made use of the family estates Wallington and Nettlecombe with its great house and 20,000 acres of land, to host a sophisticated intellectual and artistic salon of the day, renowned for the Pre-Raphaelite Brotherhood. The sister of Lord Thomas Macaulay, eminent British historian as author of the History of England, Hannah Macaulay, married into the Trevelyan family resulting in another eminent historian George Macaulay Trevelyan, whose ancestors lived at Nettlecombe.

== Arms and legend ==
One version of the Trevelyan coat of arms

Nettlecombe Court has several emblems and carvings bearing the image of a horse rising from the sea, which are the Trevilian family arms, found throughout the house. The source story of the arms is the Lyonesse legend of Trevilian, as follows: Lyonesse were the lands, now submerged, on the west coast that was said to be the lands of Camelot of King Arthur and the site of the final mortal battle between King Arthur and Mordred. Tennyson's Idylls of the King claims Lyonesse as the final resting place of King Arthur himself. Perhaps this is why the grave of the king cannot be found, as it lies beneath the sea. Roman writings also speak of a Leonis, now submerged off the coast. Lyonesse was also the home of Tristan and Isolde. Legend relates that when Lyonesse suddenly sank, it was inundated as sea levels rushed in. The sole surviving knight of King Arthur's Lyonesse was said to be only one knight, Trevilian, who escaped by riding his white horse through the rising waters to higher ground before Lyonesse was submerged. Trevilian urged the other knights to join him in his attempt to escape, who counter-urged Trevilian to stay put and wait for the floodwaters to pass. The sedentary knights jovially bet wagers amongst themselves around the supper table, as to whether or not Trevilian and his white horse could survive swimming through the incoming flooding and make it to higher ground. None of the other Arthurian knights of Lyonesse, except Trevilian, was said to have survived the great sinking and inundation of Lyonesse. Submerged Medieval church bells of the lost land of Lyonesse were later said to be heard ringing, muffled under the water, when turbulent storms created rough seas. The surviving Trevilian became the founder of the current British Trevilian-Trevelyan family, whose coat of arms still bears a white horse issuing forth from the sea. In some cases the Trevilian white horse arms may be seen combined at Nettlecombe with other related family arms, indicating marriages to Raleigh, Luttrell, Wyndham, Chichester and Strode.

== Park ==
Nettlecombe Park
- Site of Special Scientific Interest
- Location of Nettlecombe Park.
- Area of search: Somerset
- Grid reference: ST055375
- Interest: Biological
- Area: 90.4 ha (223 acres)
- Notification date: 1990
- Location map: English Nature

Nettlecombe Park is important for its lichen flora. Records suggest this site has been wood pasture or parkland for at least 400 years. There are some very old oak pollards which may be of this age or older. The oldest standard trees are over 200 years of age. The continuity of open woodland and parkland, with large mature and over-mature timber, has enabled characteristic species of epiphytic lichens and beetles to become established and persist. Many of the species in the park are now nationally scarce because this type of habitat has been eliminated over large areas of Great Britain. The park was notified as an SSSI in 1990.

Nettlecombe is known to have had a deer park by 1532. In 1556 it covered 80 acres (32 ha) and in 1619 70 acres (28 ha). In the 1690s large areas of parkland were enclosed and four new gardens created, including a water garden, which has now disappeared but is remembered in the name 'Canal Field'. The park was extended in the 18th century which included the removal of the houses that made up the village. In 1792 Thomas Veitch laid out the landscape in the style of Capability Brown including the construction of a Ha-ha between the deer park and the meadows. This included the removal of cottages and relocation of the residents. The parkland is now listed, Grade II, on the Register of Historic Parks and Gardens of special historic interest in England.

Within the grounds is the Church of St Mary the Virgin which is also a Grade I listed building.

=== Oak trees ===
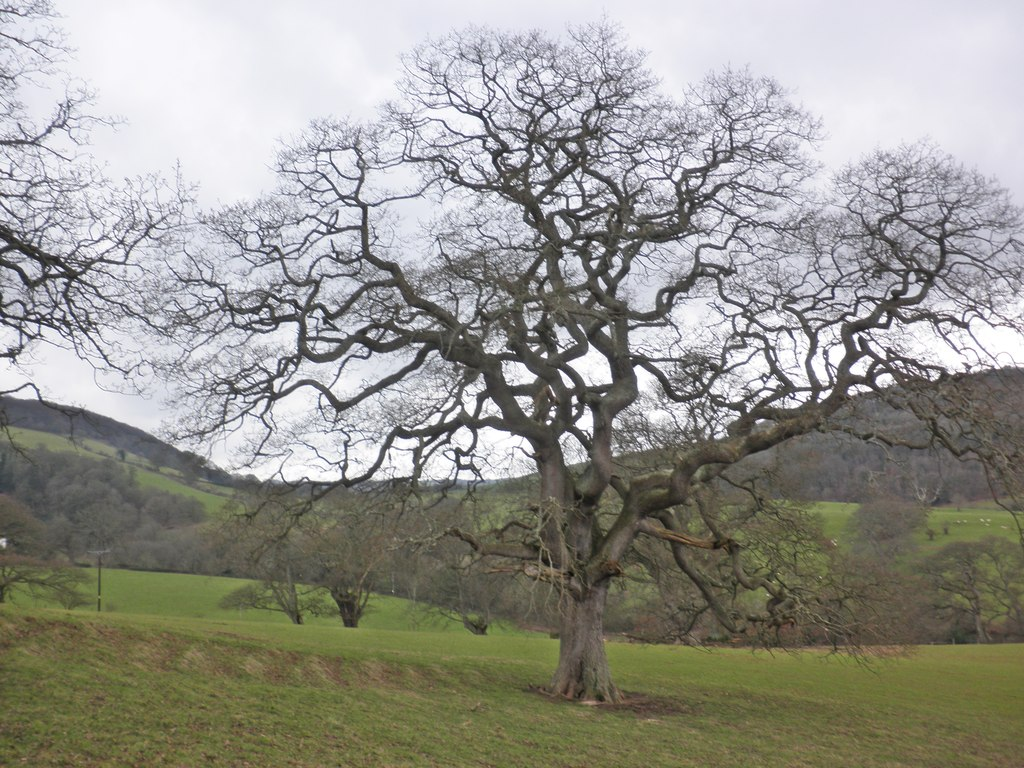
A mature tree at Nettlecombe Park

Nettlecombe Park is 223 acres (90 ha) of undulating parkland boasting monumental solitary trees and treegroups. It was probably once an oak forest in the main. Today, among these, oaks and sweet chestnuts are still the most common. Several sessile oaks are outstandingly large and were famous from ancient accounts for their great size. Nettlecombe oaks once provided tall strong trees for shipbuilding. During the reign of Queen Elizabeth I, timber hewn from the oaks of Nettlecombe were hand-selected to help build the ships of the English fleet commanded by Sir Walter Raleigh that defeated the Spanish Armada. A number of other English ships that sailed the world to establish British colonies, its navy, and trading empire were built making use of prime Nettlecombe oaks. In the 19th century very good prices were offered to the Trevelyan baronet to cut down and sell the great oaks, but the owner left them standing and the trees have been protected ever since. Some have now grown to a girth of 23 feet (7.0 m). As of 2013, Nettlecombe acorns were sold to nurseries to begin new sapling oak trees.

== See also ==
- List of Grade I listed buildings in West Somerset

== Bibliography ==
- Rose, Francis; Wolseley, Pat (1984). Nettlecombe Park: Its History and Its Epiphytic Lichens — An Attempt at Correlation. Field Studies Council. ISBN 1-85153-165-3.
