= Smallcombe =

Smallcombe is an English locational surname originating from South West England, particularly the West Country counties of Wiltshire, Devon and Somerset. Small is a description of size and combe is a local word meaning cleft or valley (cf Welsh 'cwm' and Celtic 'cumb'). A 'small combe' is, then, a geographical feature and combe is found in many place names in South West England.

Notable persons with the surname include:

- Max Smallcombe (born 1999), Welsh footballer
- William Albert Smallcombe (1892–1992), British writer and curator

== See also ==
- Smallacombe
- Smallcombe Cemetery
