= Allercombe =

Hamlet in Devon, England

Coordinates: 50°44′34″N 3°20′55″W

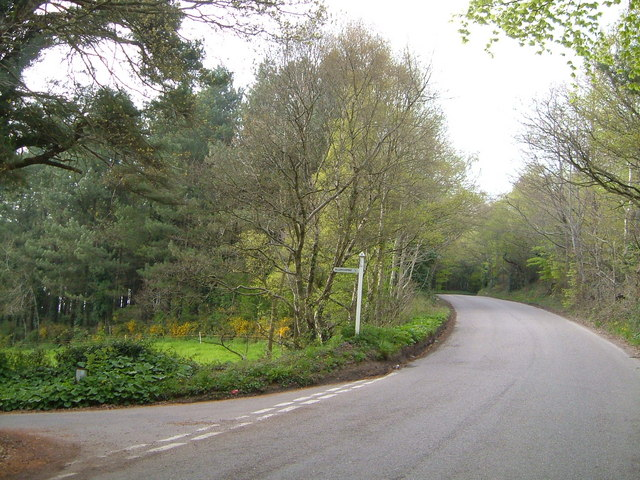

- Location within Devon
- OS grid reference: SY0494
- Shire county: Devon
- Region: South West
- Country: England
- Sovereign state: United Kingdom
- Police: Devon and Cornwall
- Fire: Devon and Somerset
- Ambulance: South Western
- UK Parliament: Exmouth and Exeter East

Allercombe is a hamlet in east Devon, England. It lies just south of the A30 road between the villages of Whimple and Aylesbeare.
