= Nettlecombe, Isle of Wight =

Hamlet on the Isle of Wight, England

Coordinates: 50°36′07″N 1°15′29″W

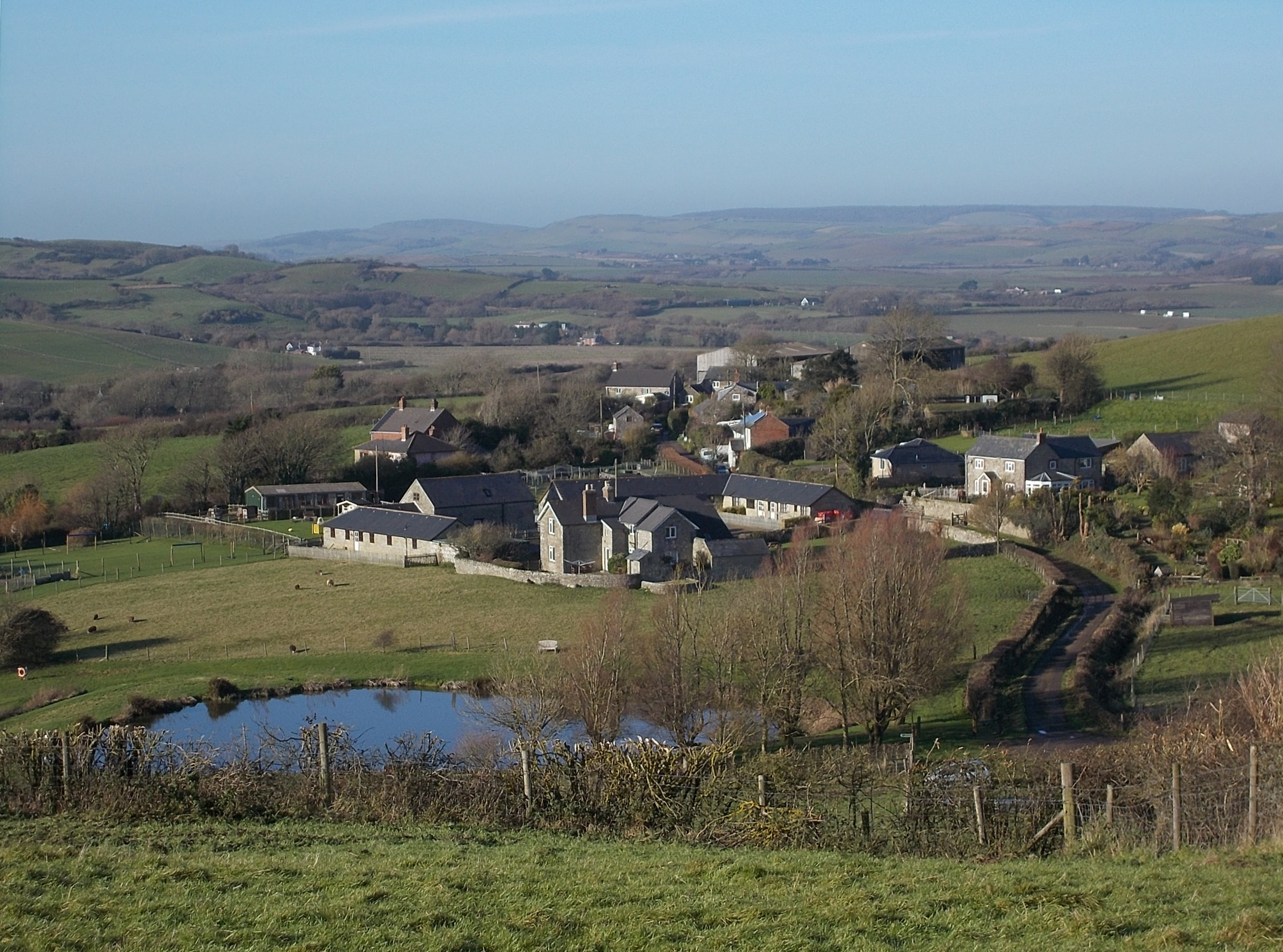
Nettlecombe

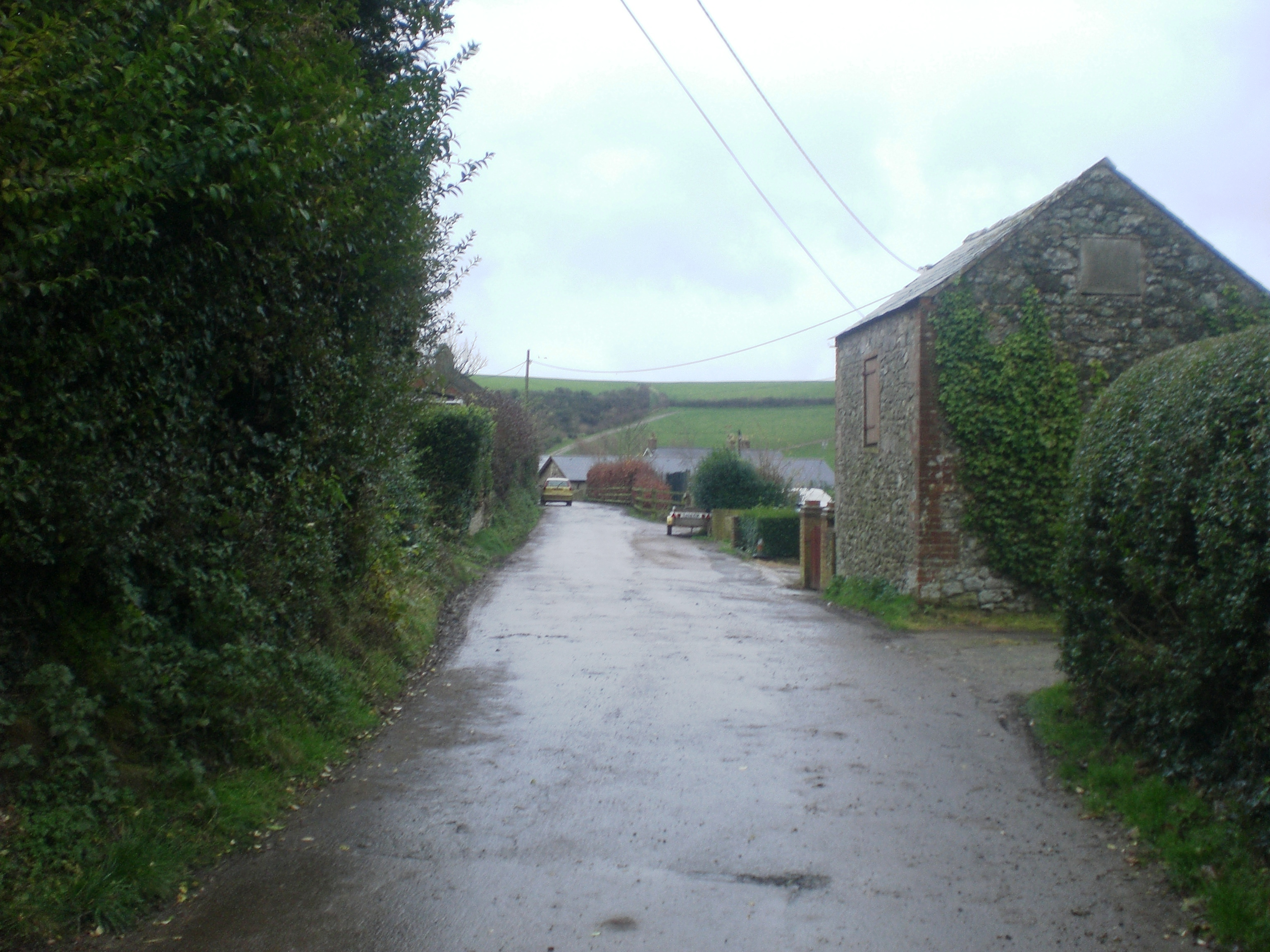
The main road through Nettlecombe.

Nettlecombe is a farming hamlet on the Isle of Wight. It is the site of a deserted medieval village, and there is evidence of earthworks close to the present hamlet. There are several fishing lakes in Nettlecombe.

It lies along Nettlecombe Lane, about half a mile north-east of Whitwell. Until 1952, the Isle of Wight Central Railway had a station on Nettlecombe Lane.

== Name ==
The name means 'the valley where nettles grow', from Old English netele and cumb. There are places with the same name in Dorset and Somerset.

~1200: Netelcumba

1253: Netelcumbe

1271: Ntelcumbe

1351: Netelcombe

1417: Netylcombe
