= Chambercombe =

Suburb of Ilfracombe, North Devon, England

Coordinates: 51°12′24″N 4°06′42″W

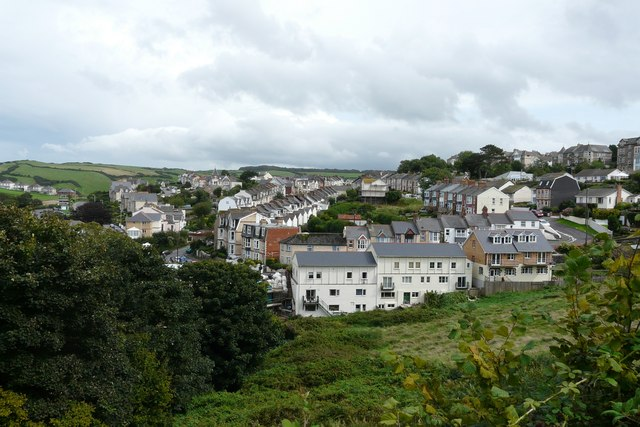
Chambercombe

Chambercombe is a hilly suburb in the North Devon town of Ilfracombe.
