= Brenscombe Heath =

Protected area in Dorset, England

Coordinates: 50.64578°N 2.02258°W

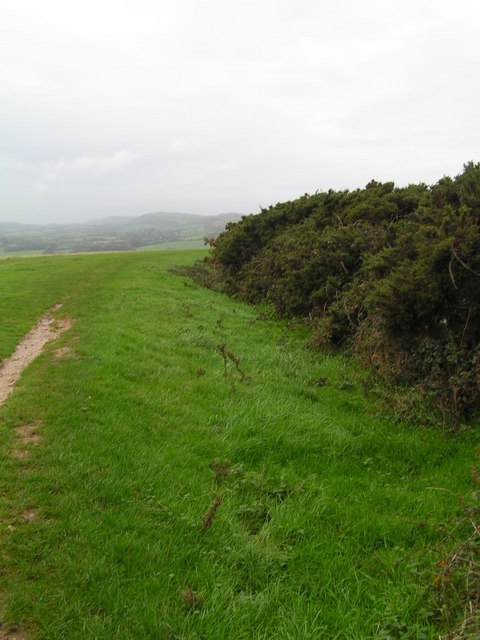
Gorse on Brenscombe_Hill

Brenscombe Heath (grid reference SY985829) is a 34.7 hectare biological Site of Special Scientific Interest in Corfe Castle, Dorset, notified in 1985.

== Sources ==
- English Nature citation sheet for the site (accessed 31 August 2006)
