= Chilcombe =

Hamlet in Dorset, England

Coordinates: 50.7173°N 2.6695°W

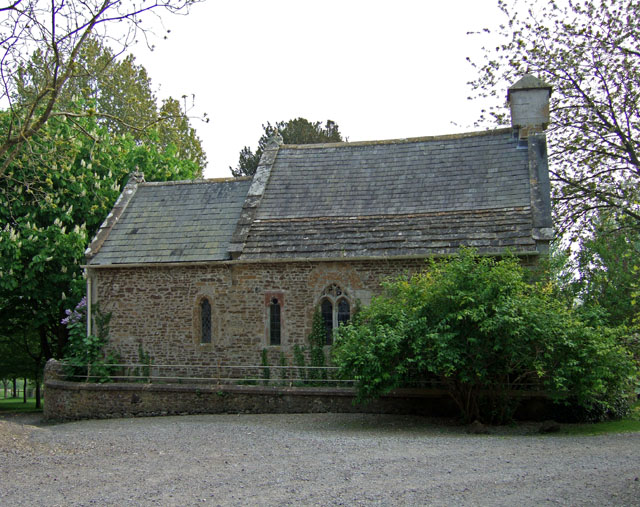
- Chilcombe church

- Location within Dorset
- Population: 10
- OS grid reference: SY528910
- Civil parish: Chilcombe
- Unitary authority: Dorset
- Ceremonial county: Dorset
- Region: South West
- Country: England
- Sovereign state: United Kingdom
- Post town: Bridport
- Postcode district: DT6
- Dialling code: 01308
- Police: Dorset
- Fire: Dorset and Wiltshire
- Ambulance: South Western
- UK Parliament: West Dorset

Chilcombe is a hamlet and civil parish in Dorset, England, situated in the Dorset unitary authority administrative area about 4 miles (6.4 km) east of Bridport and 10 miles (16 km) west of the county town, Dorchester. It comprises a church, an 18th-century farmhouse with farm buildings, and a couple of cottages. In 2013 the estimated population of the parish was 10.

In 1086 in the Domesday Book Chilcombe was recorded as Ciltecome; it had 14 households, 3 ploughlands, 25 acres (10 ha) of meadow, 20 acres (8.1 ha) of pasture and one mill. It was in Uggescombe Hundred and the lord and tenant-in-chief was Brictwin the reeve.

The manor of Chilcombe together with the manor and rectory of Toller Fratrum formerly comprised an estate of the Knights Hospitaller, returned as the 'camera' of Chilcombe (camera meaning in this context an estate with no community and farmed out to a tenant) in 1338, when it was valued at £4 5s. 4d. and paid 30 marks into the Order's treasury at Clerkenwell Priory.

Parts of Chilcombe parish church — the south wall of the nave and probably also the chancel — date from the 12th century. The Tudor manor house was demolished in 1939.
