= West Compton =

West Compton can refer to:

- West Compton, California, USA
- West Compton, Dorset, England
- West Compton, Somerset, England
