= Bascote =

Coordinates: 52.26°N 1.41°W

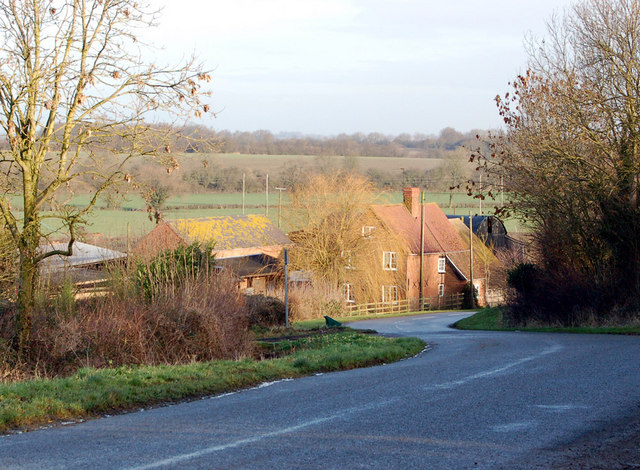
- Bascote, south end

- Location within Warwickshire
- OS grid reference: SP4063
- Shire county: Warwickshire
- Region: West Midlands
- Country: England
- Sovereign state: United Kingdom
- Post town: Southam
- Postcode district: CV47 2
- Police: Warwickshire
- Fire: Warwickshire
- Ambulance: West Midlands

Bascote is a hamlet in rural Warwickshire, England, within the civil parish of Long Itchington. The nearest town is Southam, 1.5 miles away. Bascote consists of a small number of large houses, a post box and a telephone box. Nearby is Bascote Heath home to a few country mansions, facility, several country cottages, farms, a war memorial, and the Fox and Hen public house.

== Environmental issues ==
The planned HS2 rail line will be under the Bascote Woods. There is also a planned solar farm.
