= Batworthy =

Village in Devon, England

Coordinates: 50.65°N 03.82°W

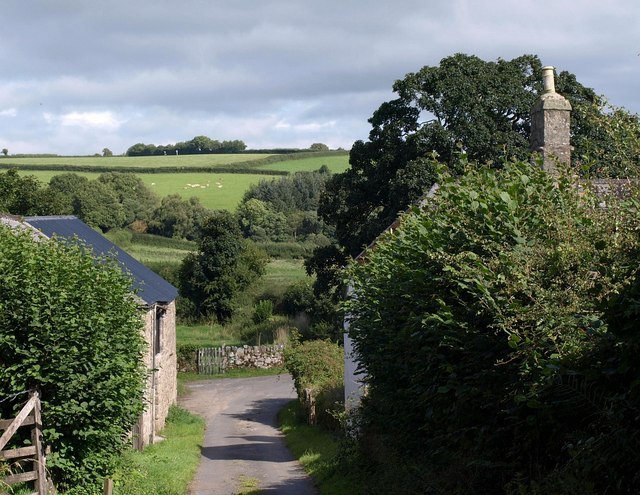
- Batworthy

- Location within Devon
- OS grid reference: SX7185
- Shire county: Devon
- Region: South West
- Country: England
- Sovereign state: United Kingdom
- Police: Devon and Cornwall
- Fire: Devon and Somerset
- Ambulance: South Western

Batworthy is a village in Devon, England.
