= Occombe Valley Woods =

Local Nature Reserve in Devon, England

Coordinates: 50.454608°N 3.582423°W

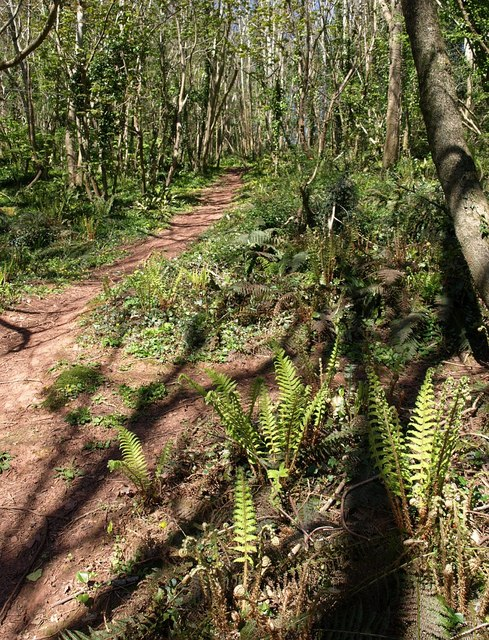
Ferns in Occombe Valley Woods

Occombe Valley Woods is a Local Nature Reserve near Paignton in Devon. It is an ancient woodland owned by Torbay Borough Council, and managed by the Torbay Coast and Countryside Trust.
