= Batsworthy =

Village in Devon, England

Coordinates: 50.95°N 03.68°W

- Location within Devon
- OS grid reference: SS8219
- Shire county: Devon
- Region: South West
- Country: England
- Sovereign state: United Kingdom
- Police: Devon and Cornwall
- Fire: Devon and Somerset
- Ambulance: South Western

Batsworthy is a village in Devon, England.
