= Pitcombe Down =

Protected area in Dorset, England

Coordinates: 50.70545°N 2.58906°W

Pitcombe Down (grid reference SY585897) is a 13.2 hectare biological Site of Special Scientific Interest in Dorset, notified in 1954.

== Sources ==
- English Nature citation sheet for the site (accessed 31 August 2006)
