= Flexcombe =

Hamlet in Hampshire, England

Coordinates: 51.037418°N 0.911447°W

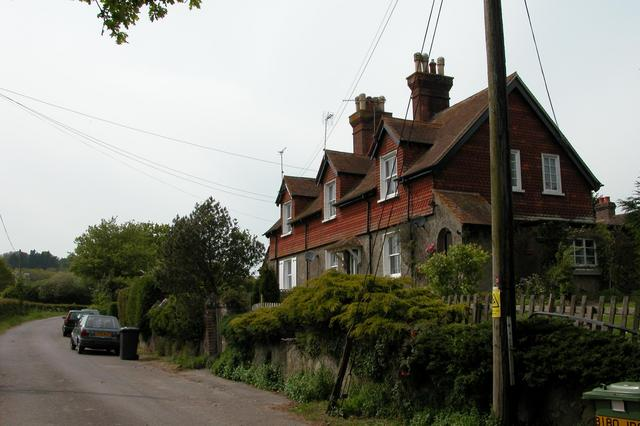
- Cottages at Flexcombe

- Location within Hampshire
- OS grid reference: SU7642027015
- District: East Hampshire
- Shire county: Hampshire
- Region: South East
- Country: England
- Sovereign state: United Kingdom
- Post town: LISS
- Postcode district: GU33
- Dialling code: 01420
- Police: Hampshire and Isle of Wight
- Fire: Hampshire and Isle of Wight
- Ambulance: South Central
- UK Parliament: East Hampshire

Flexcombe is a two housed place in the civil parish of Liss, in the East Hampshire district of Hampshire, England. The hamlet is situated in the South Downs National Park, just off the A3 bypass near Petersfield. Its nearest town is Petersfield, which lies approximately 3.3 miles (4.9 km) south-west from the hamlet. Although, it lies closer to Liss.
