= Prescombe Down =

Protected area in Wiltshire, England

Coordinates: 51.02886°N 2.02276°W

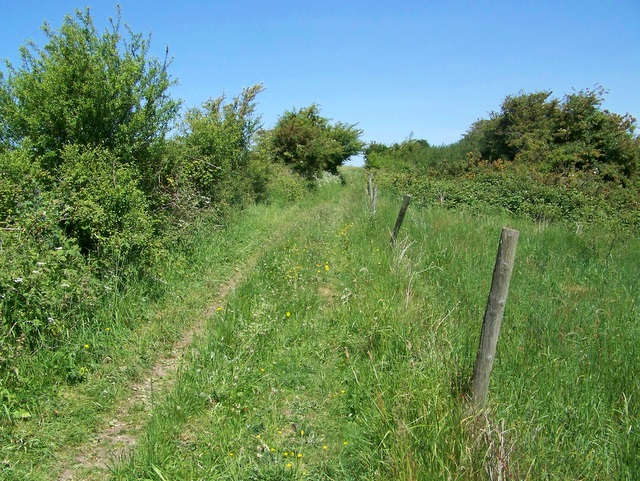
Byway, Prescombe Down

Prescombe Down (grid reference ST985255) is a biological Site of Special Scientific Interest in Wiltshire, notified in 1951.

== Sources ==
- Natural England citation sheet for the site (accessed 25 May 2023)
