= Combebow =

Village in Devon, England

Coordinates: 50.66°N 04.15°W

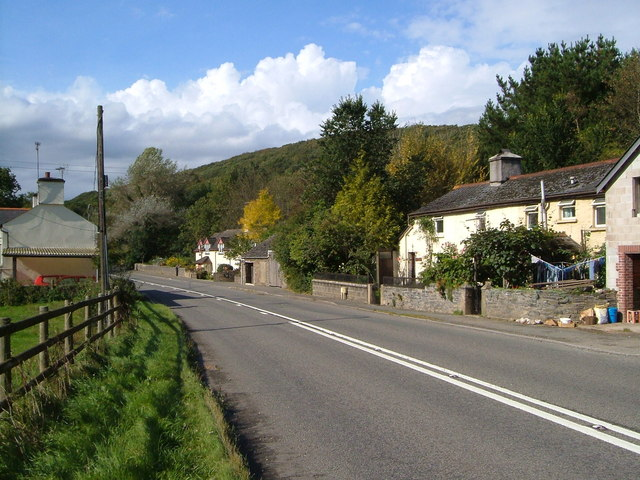

- Location within Devon
- OS grid reference: SX4887
- Shire county: Devon
- Region: South West
- Country: England
- Sovereign state: United Kingdom
- Police: Devon and Cornwall
- Fire: Devon and Somerset
- Ambulance: South Western

Combebow is a hamlet in Devon, England. It is situated by the River Lew.
