= Holcombe, East Devon =

Hamlet in Devon, United Kingdom

Coordinates: 50.73346°N 2.972°W

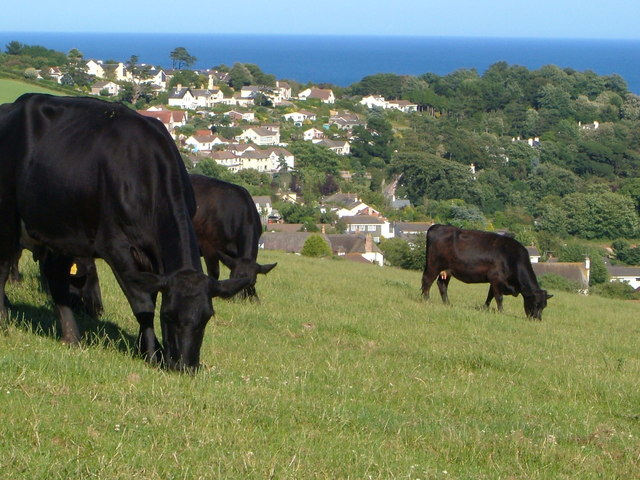
Cattle at Holcombe

Holcombe is a hamlet in Uplyme civil parish in the district of East Devon in the English county of Devon.

Holcombe is located northwest of the town of Lyme Regis about a mile west of Uplyme village. The Iron Age "Holcombe Mirror", now in the British Museum, was found on a farm here in 1970 by Devon Archaeological Society when excavating the site of a Roman villa.
