= Coombe, Kea =

Village in Cornwall, England

Coordinates: 50.22841°N 5.03543°W

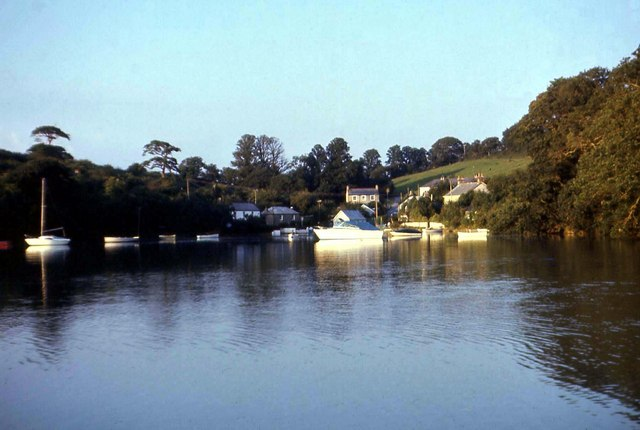
Coombe, Kea

Coombe (Cornish: Komm) is a village in Kea parish in Cornwall, England, United Kingdom.

The village lies beside the River Fal approximately 2 1/2 miles (4 km) south of Truro at grid reference SW836409.

Coombe lies within the Cornwall Area of Outstanding Natural Beauty (AONB).
