= Bocombe =

Hamlet in Devon, England

Coordinates: 50.96°N 04.30°W

- Location within Devon
- OS grid reference: SS3821
- Shire county: Devon
- Region: South West
- Country: England
- Sovereign state: United Kingdom
- Police: Devon and Cornwall
- Fire: Devon and Somerset
- Ambulance: South Western

Bocombe is a hamlet in Devon, England.
