= Huntercombe =

Area of Buckinghamshire, England

Coordinates: 51.5202°N 0.6547°W

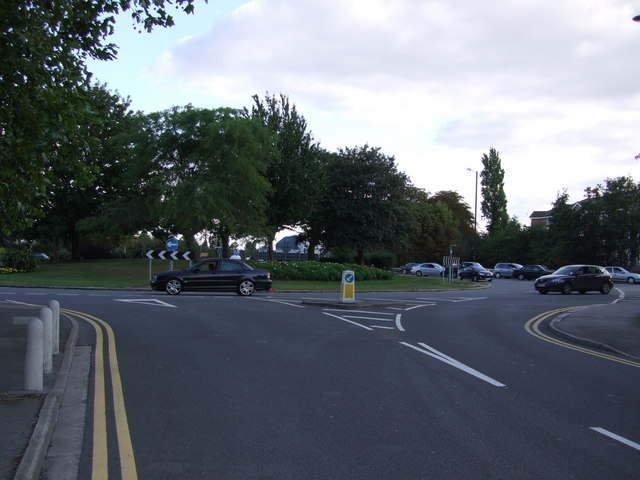
Huntercombe roundabout

Huntercombe is an area of Cippenham in Slough in the English historic county of Buckinghamshire, although it was administered as part of Berkshire between 1974 and 1996. It adjoins Burnham in Buckinghamshire. The district is well known to residents of Slough and Burnham, but is usually not listed on maps of the area.

The area includes the public house Ye Olde Huntercombe Arms, situated on the Huntercombe Roundabout. This leads to the Huntercombe Spur, a dual carriageway to J7 on the M4 Motorway. On the Burnham side of the area, it includes the Maidenhead Huntercombe Hospital (formerly Huntercombe Manor), which is part of The Huntercombe Group, and Burnham Abbey.
