= Coombe, Camborne =

Hamlet in Cornwall, England

Coordinates: 50.23394°N 5.32610°W

Coombe: Cornish: Komm
- Hamlet
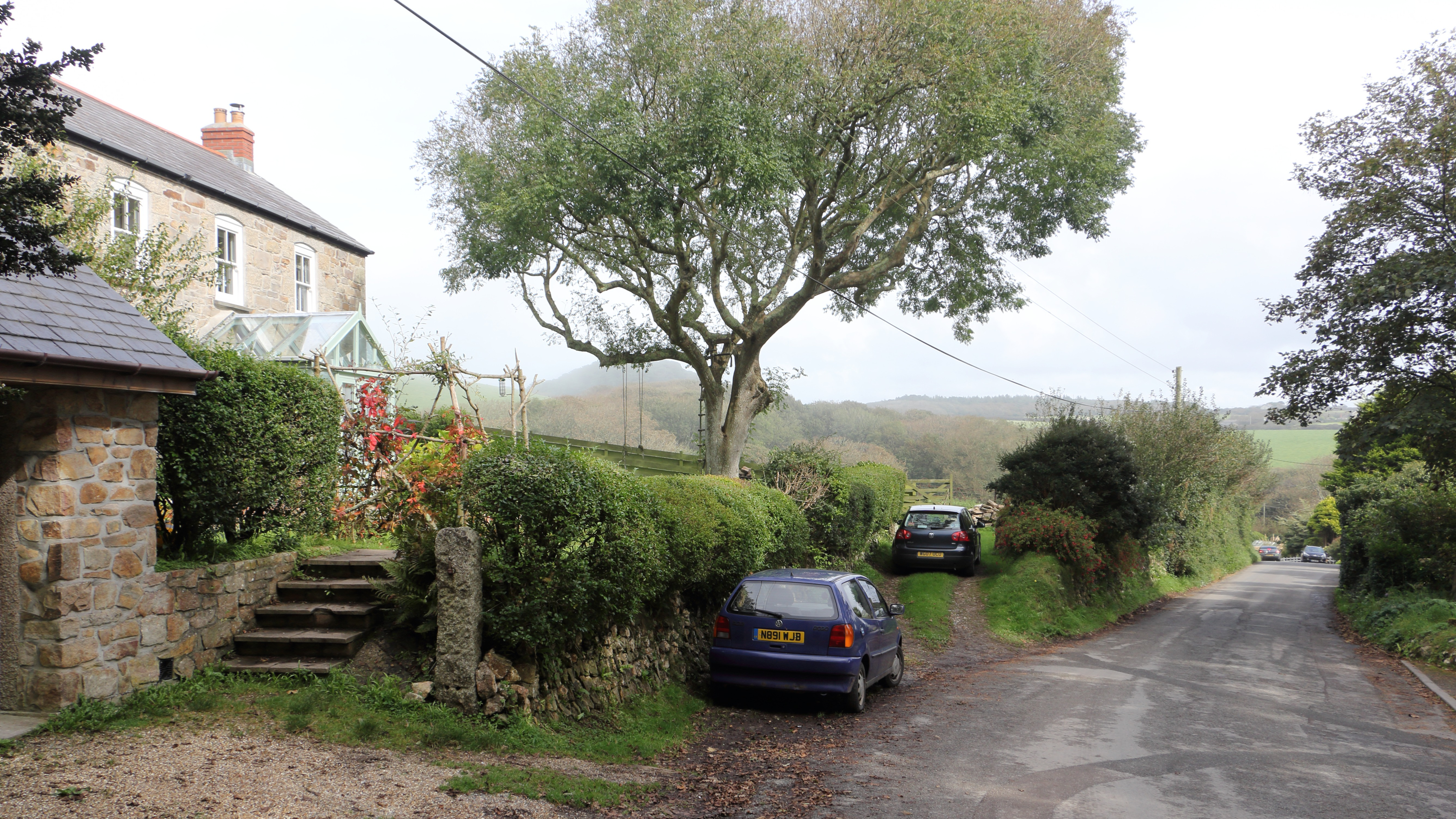
- A road in Coombe

- Location within Cornwall
- Unitary authority: Cornwall
- Region: South West
- Country: England
- Sovereign state: United Kingdom
- Police: Devon and Cornwall
- Fire: Cornwall
- Ambulance: South Western

Coombe (Cornish: Komm) is a hamlet in west Cornwall, England, United Kingdom. It is situated two miles (3 km) north of the town of Camborne in the valley of the Red River at grid reference SW 629 424.
