= Upton Coombe =

Protected area in Gloucestershire, England

Coordinates: 51.58775°N 2.30595°W

- Site of Special Scientific Interest
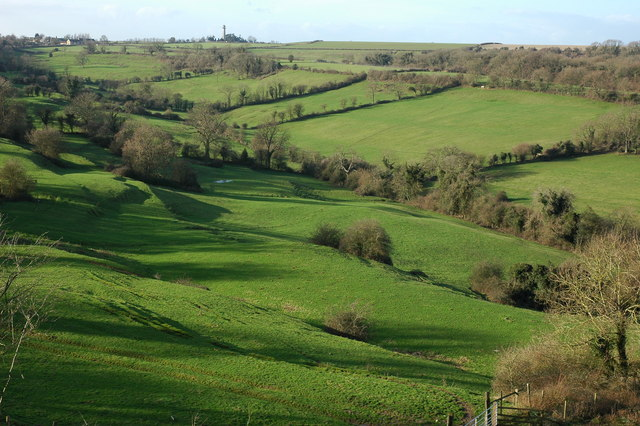
- Location of Upton Coombe.
- Area of search: Avon
- Grid reference: ST789877
- Interest: Biological
- Area: 7.4 ha (18 acres)
- Notification date: 1989
- Location map: English Nature

Upton Coombe (grid reference ST789877) is a 7.4 hectare biological Site of Special Scientific Interest near the village of Hawkesbury Upton, South Gloucestershire, notified in 1989.

== Sources ==
- English Nature citation sheet for the site (accessed 17 July 2006)
