= Combe Bottom =

Nature reserve in Surrey, England

Coordinates: 51.229°N 0.47°W

- Site of Special Scientific Interest
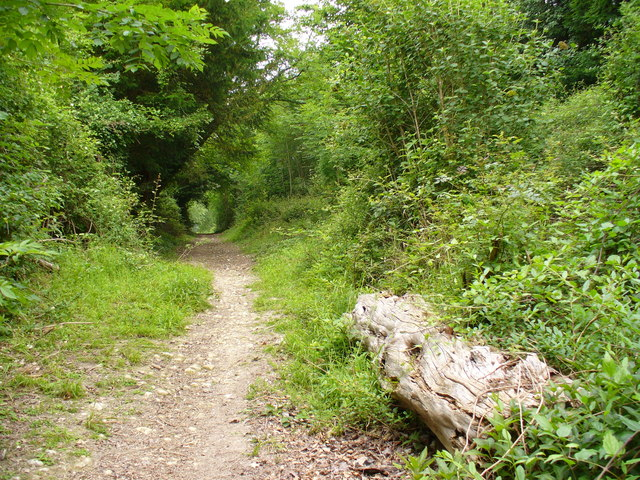
- Location of Combe Bottom.
- Area of search: Surrey
- Grid reference: TQ 069 489
- Interest: Biological
- Area: 42.1 hectares (104 acres)
- Notification date: 1988
- Location map: Magic Map

Combe Bottom is a 42.1-hectare (104-acre) biological Site of Special Scientific Interest north of Shere in Surrey. It is designated a Local Nature Reserve called Shere Woodlands, and is managed by the Surrey Wildlife Trust.

This site on a slope of the North Downs is mainly woodland and scrub, with a small area of unimproved chalk grassland. The woodland is dominated by beech and yew. There is a wide variety of bryophytes, including the rare moss Herzogiella seligeri.

There is access from Staple Lane and Combe Lane.
