= Combe Pafford =

Village in Devon, England

Coordinates: 50.49°N 3.53°W

Location of Combe Pafford in Devon

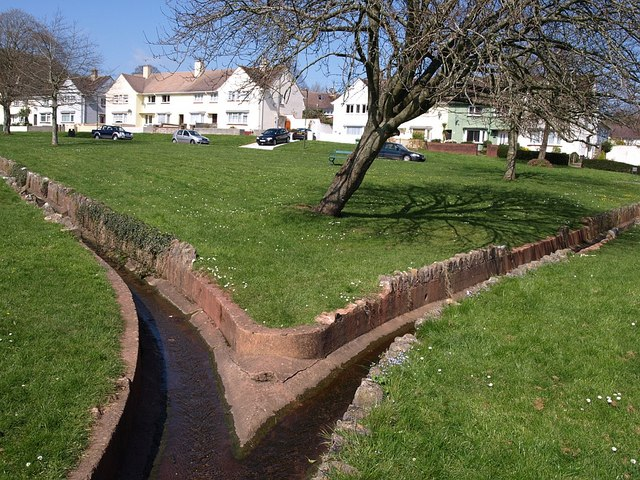
Water channels on Firlands Road in Combe Pafford

Combe Pafford is a village in Torbay in the English county of Devon.
