= Batcombe, Dorset =

Village in Dorset, England

Coordinates: 50.8347°N 2.5437°W

Batcombe
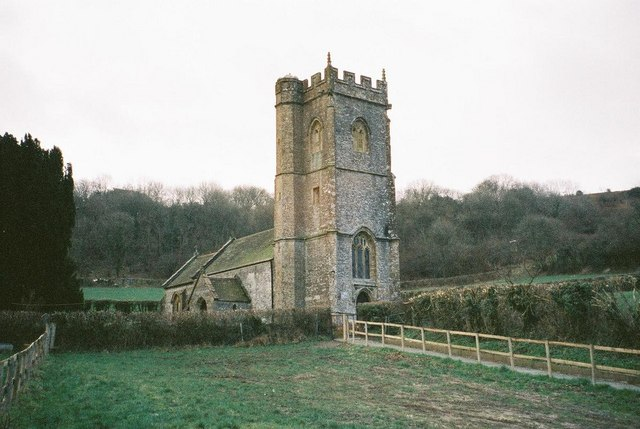
- Batcombe parish church of St Mary

- Location within Dorset
- Population: 120 (2013 estimate)
- OS grid reference: ST617038
- Civil parish: Batcombe
- Unitary authority: Dorset
- Ceremonial county: Dorset
- Region: South West
- Country: England
- Sovereign state: United Kingdom
- Post town: DORCHESTER
- Postcode district: DT2
- Dialling code: 01305
- Police: Dorset
- Fire: Dorset and Wiltshire
- Ambulance: South Western
- UK Parliament: West Dorset
- Website: http://www.batcombe.co.uk/

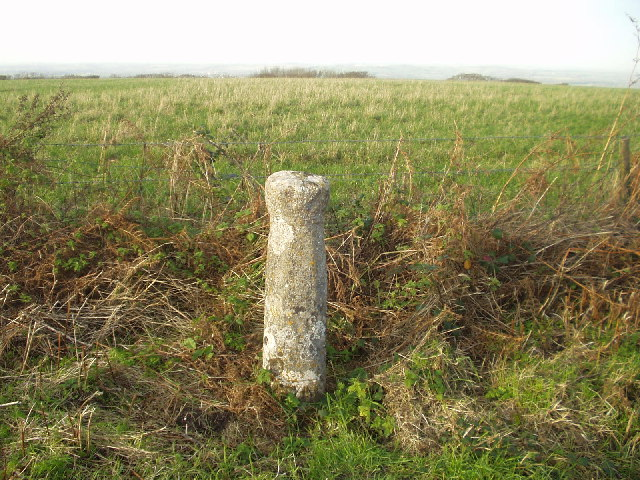
The "Cross in Hand" on Batcombe Down

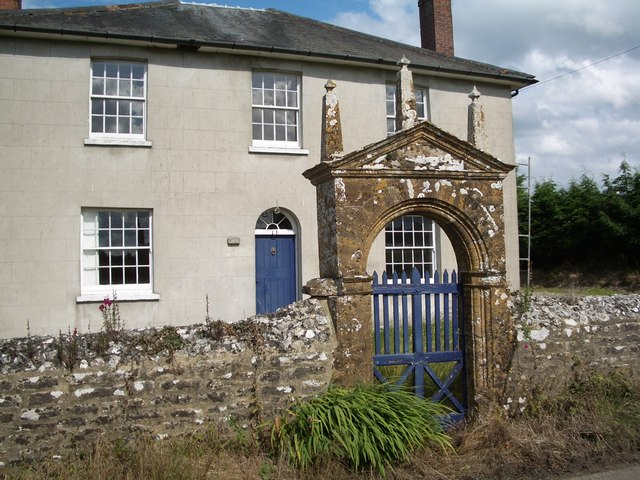
Newlands Farm with its archway dated 1622

Batcombe is a small straggling village and civil parish in Dorset, England, situated 12 miles (19 km) north-west of Dorchester below the northern scarp slope of the Dorset Downs. The name Batcombe derives from the Old English Bata, a man's name, and cumb, meaning valley. In 1201 it was known as Batecumbe. The local travel links are located 3 miles (4.8 km) from the village to Chetnole railway station and 31 miles (50 km) to Bournemouth Airport. The main road running through the village is Stile Way. Dorset County Council's 2013 mid-year estimate of the population of the civil parish was 120. The civil parish is served by High Stoy Parish Council, which also covers Hermitage and Hilfield parishes.

== Parish church ==
The church of St Mary Magdalene is on an ancient site. There has probably been a church there from the 11th century. The current building comprises a chancel, nave and 15th-century tower. The interior contains a font that has a Norman column (made from Ham Hill stone) with a cube-shaped limestone basin (probably made from Portesham stone); the basin is probably older than the column. The church interior also contains an elaborate stone screen, which is also made from Ham Hill stone.

== Cross-in-Hand ==
Above the village rises Batcombe Down and, further east, Gore Hill, near the top of which is a small stone pillar known as the Cross-in-Hand (or Cross and Hand). The pillar, a Grade II listed structure and a Scheduled Ancient Monument, is a little over 1 metre (3.3 ft) in height and may date from before the Norman Conquest, as do other shafts such as the Pillar of Eliseg. At one time there may have been a hand carved on one face, but nothing is visible today, though the pillar has acquired stories about images of a ghostly hand being seen grasping a bowl at its top. Thomas Hardy used the pillar in his novel Tess of the D'Urbervilles, in a scene in which Alec d'Urberville instructs Tess to "put your hand upon that stone hand, and swear that you will never tempt me—by your charms or ways." The pillar also features in Hardy's poem "The Lost Pyx".

== Manor house ==
The Minterne family was for a long time the Lords of the Manor and Newlands Farm was the manor house between the 16th and 18th centuries. The front roadside wall of the farmhouse has an ashlar hamstone archway dating from 1622.

== Folklore ==
The parish church is the subject of one of Dorset's more curious tales, in which the local squire—who was known as 'Conjuring Minterne'—once rode his horse off Batcombe Hill and knocked off one of the pinnacles on the tower. He dabbled in magic and was regarded with a great deal of fear and superstition locally. After setting off to ride over steep Batcombe Hill one day, he suddenly remembered he had left his magic book open on the table, where his servants might find it. To save going back by the road, he turned his horse round and spurred it to attempt a massive leap over the church, knocking off the pinnacle as he soared clear over the tower. The fearful villagers were afraid that they might offend the devil by repairing the damage, so for a hundred years they left it alone. When it was repaired, they repaired it at a crooked angle. It is said that Minterne vowed that he would be buried neither in nor out of the church, so he was buried half in and half out of the Minterne Chapel. Much of the church was rebuilt by John Hicks in 1864, which resulted in the loss of the Minterne chapel. The memorial tablets were repositioned on the north side of the tower.

A "conjurer" used to be an important character in a Dorset village, and was generally of good reputation. He was supposed to be gifted with supernatural power, which he exercised for good, and by his incantations and ceremonies he cured many sicknesses.
