= Combe, Yealmpton, Devon =

Village in Devon, England

Coordinates: 50.351°N 4.047°W

Combe
- Location within Devon
- OS grid reference: SX5452
- District: South Hams
- Shire county: Devon
- Region: South West
- Country: England
- Sovereign state: United Kingdom
- Post town: PLYMOUTH
- Postcode district: PL8
- Police: Devon and Cornwall
- Fire: Devon and Somerset
- Ambulance: South Western
- UK Parliament: South West Devon

Combe is a village near Yealmpton in the county of Devon, England.
