= Bodmiscombe =

Hamlet in Devon, England

Coordinates: 50.87°N 03.28°W

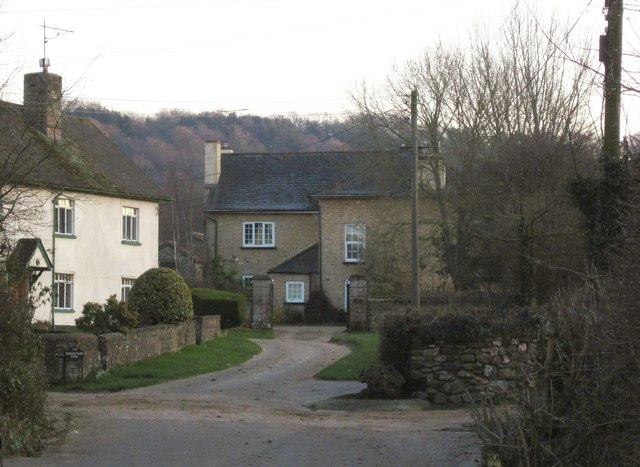
- Bodmiscombe

- Location within Devon
- OS grid reference: ST1009
- Shire county: Devon
- Region: South West
- Country: England
- Sovereign state: United Kingdom
- Police: Devon and Cornwall
- Fire: Devon and Somerset
- Ambulance: South Western

Bodmiscombe is a Hamlet in Devon, England.
