= Battram =

Village in North West Leicestershire, England

Coordinates: 52.67°N 01.38°W

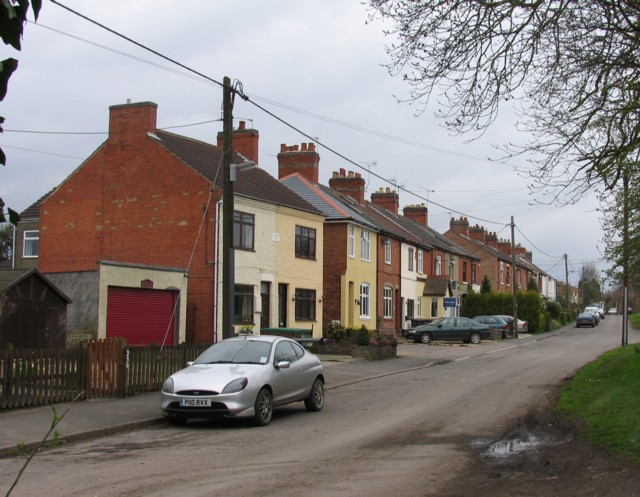
- Older-style terraced housing in Battram

- Location within Leicestershire
- OS grid reference: SK4209
- Civil parish: Ibstock
- District: North West Leicestershire
- Shire county: Leicestershire
- Region: East Midlands
- Country: England
- Sovereign state: United Kingdom
- Police: Leicestershire
- Fire: Leicestershire
- Ambulance: East Midlands

Battram is a village forming part of the Ibstock civil parish in North West Leicestershire, England.

Battram is named after Johnny Battram, who had the original cottage, but very much expanded with the coming of coal mining in the area. The village was in the shadow of Nailstone pit and not far from the Ellistown and Ibstock Collieries. Nailstone is in the National Forest and has a newly planted wood on its eastern side.
