= Coombe, Mid Devon =

Village in Devon, England

Coordinates: 50.945°N 3.423°W

Coombe is a settlement in the English county of Devon, situated some 5 miles (8 km) north-east of the town of Tiverton.
