= Batcombe Down =

18.6 hectare biological site of special scientific interest in Dorset, England

Coordinates: 50.83430°N 2.53672°W

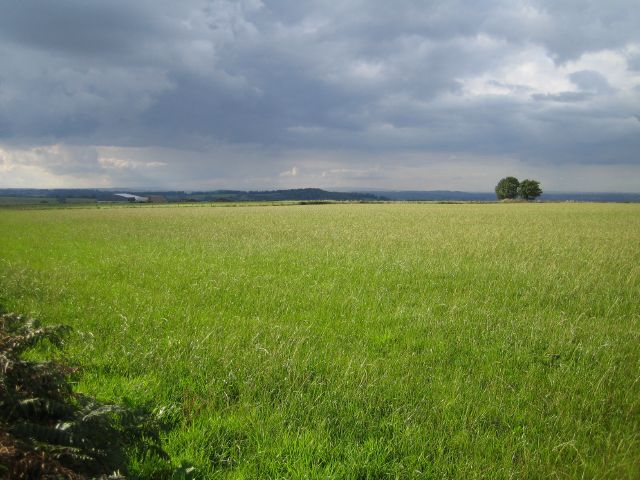

Batcombe Down (grid reference ST623040) is an 18.6 hectare biological Site of Special Scientific Interest in Dorset, England: notified in 1952.

== Sources ==
- English Nature citation sheet for the site (accessed 29 August 2006)
