= The Huntercombe Group =

British private mental health provider

- Company type: Private
- Founded: 1998
- Headquarters: United Kingdom

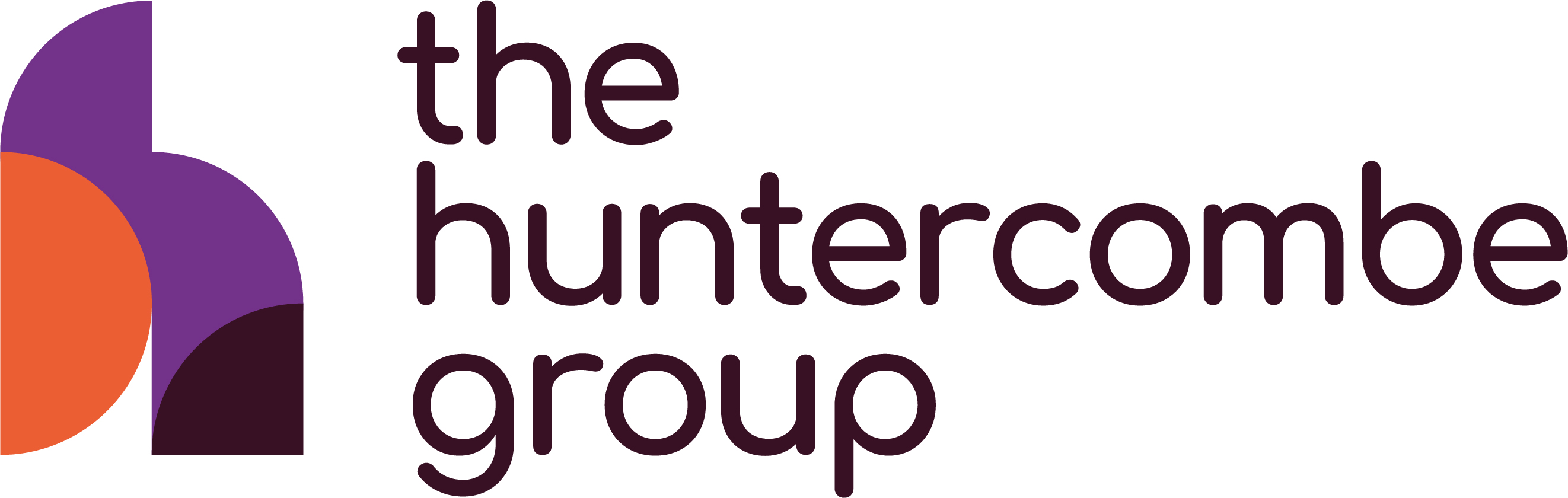
The Huntercombe Group Logo ( 2021 onwards )

The Huntercombe Group is a specialist health provider in the United Kingdom specialising in the Child and Adolescent Mental Health Services (CAMHS), Adult Mental Health, Brain Injury Rehabilitation and Neurological Care Centre, Adult Learning Disability and Children's Complex Needs. It operates 12 hospitals and specialist centres located throughout England and Scotland.

In March 2021, Huntercombe was acquired by Montreux Capital Management and the company has a new senior leadership team. Sites include included Huntercombe Brain Injury and Neurological Care Centre in Murdostoun, Scotland; Huntercombe Hospital Maidenhead; Frenchay Brain injury Centre; Huntercombe Hospital Stafford, Huntercombe Hospital Roehampton and Blackheath Brain Injury Centre.

== Funding ==
Patients are funded largely by the NHS and Local Authorities and, since the changes in NHS commissioning, provides some of its services under the NHS England Contract.

== Performance ==
The Huntercombe Hospital, Stafford was criticised heavily for a lack of staff and failing to intervene when a patient self-harmed with contraband items in 2016. The Care Quality Commission rated it as good in 2018 but in 2022 downgraded it to ‘inadequate’, saying that the staff failed to provide kind and compassionate care and did not treat children with respect.

Linden House was a Huntercombe assessment and treatment unit (ATU) in the East Riding, which has been closed since December 2014. Stephanie Bincliffe, who had a learning disability and autism, was placed there when she was 18 and kept in a padded room where she had little or no fresh air or exercise for almost seven years until her death. She gained ten stone during her time in the unit, becoming morbidly obese and yet she had no independent access to food. Some of the evidence at the inquest into her death criticised the hospital’s management of her physical health and obesity. It was alleged that hospital staff failed to act in her best interests regarding her weight gain, contrary to the requirements of the Mental Capacity Act 2005. However, the inquest into the death of Miss Bincliffe found there was no evidence of neglect and that her weight could not have been easily managed due to her severe autism and the level of self-harming which would have resulted from any attempt to alter her diet or get her to exercise more. Furthermore, due to a pre-existing heart condition (which ultimately proved fatal) surgery was not an option.

Watcombe Hall in Torquay, was closed to new admissions on the second day of an inspection by the Care Quality Commission in May 2017. Young people with malnutrition and dehydration had been repeatedly admitted to Torbay Hospital. The CQC found staff had not received specific training in caring for young people with eating disorders. Inspectors saw a young person climb a fence and abscond.

It was told by the Care Quality Commission to improve its corporate governance in 2018, and to recruit more experienced Child and Adolescent Mental Health Services staff.

Cedar House, a low secure unit for 39 people with learning disabilities and autism, in Barham, Kent was inspected by the Care Quality Commission in February 2020 and put into special measures because of excessive use of restraint measures, much on one inappropriately placed patient.

The Maidenhead hospital, which provides specialist child and adolescent mental health inpatient services, was put into special measures by the Care Quality Commission in February 2021 after young people ‘appeared to be over sedated’ during an inspection. The hospital’s overall rating was reduced from “good” to “inadequate”. Although it had been rated “good” by the CQC in 2016 and 2019 there had been earlier complaints. It was upgraded to “requires improvement” in September 2021, although there were still concerns about staffing levels. As of 2022, Huntercombe Hospital in Maidenhead was run by the Active Care Group, when a 15-year old patient died while she should have been under constant watch, and by 2025 the hospital had closed.
