= Battlescombe =

Hamlet in Gloucestershire, England

Coordinates: 51.753°N 2.119°W

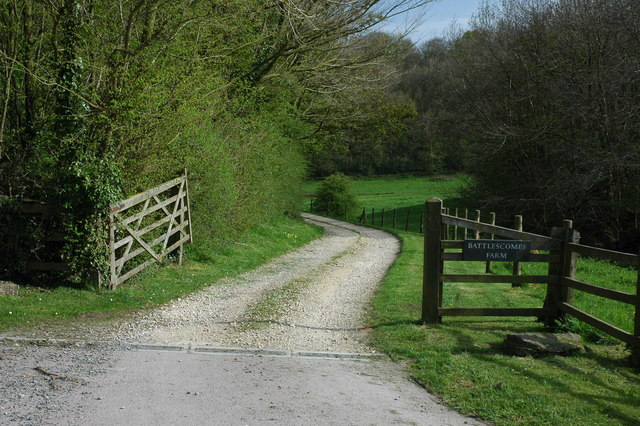
- Entrance to Battlescombe Farm

- Location within Gloucestershire
- OS grid reference: SO918060
- Civil parish: Bisley-with-Lypiatt
- District: Stroud
- Shire county: Gloucestershire
- Region: South West
- Country: England
- Sovereign state: United Kingdom
- Police: Gloucestershire
- Fire: Gloucestershire
- Ambulance: South Western

Battlescombe is an hamlet in the village of Bisley in Gloucestershire, England.
