= Coombe, East Devon =

Village in Devon, England

Coordinates: 50.7198°N 3.2735°W

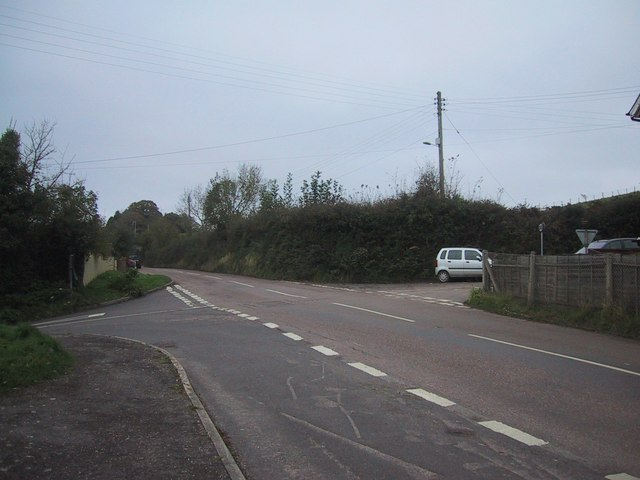
Coombe, East Devon

Coombe is a hamlet in the English county of Devon, about 3 miles (5 km) northwest of the town of Sidmouth at grid reference SY102919.
