= Burcombe =

Village in Wiltshire, England

Coordinates: 51.078°N 1.902°W

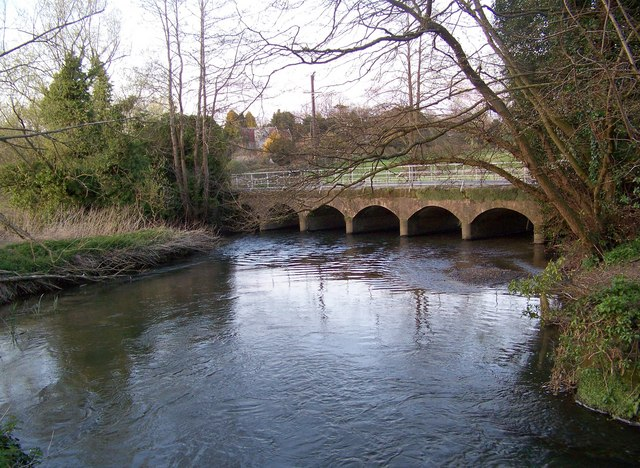
- River Nadder, Burcombe

- Location within Wiltshire
- Population: 156 (in 2011)
- OS grid reference: SU070310
- Civil parish: Burcombe Without
- Unitary authority: Wiltshire
- Ceremonial county: Wiltshire
- Region: South West
- Country: England
- Sovereign state: United Kingdom
- Post town: Salisbury
- Postcode district: SP2
- Dialling code: 01722
- Police: Wiltshire
- Fire: Dorset and Wiltshire
- Ambulance: South Western
- UK Parliament: Salisbury
- Website: Parish Council

Burcombe is a village in the civil parish of Burcombe Without, in Wiltshire, England. The village is about 4.5 miles (7 km) west of Salisbury city centre and lies each side of an unclassified road. Burcombe is an unspoiled village with many of the houses' gardens leading down to the River Nadder. The parish includes the hamlet of Ugford which is on the A30 road near the boundary with Wilton parish.

== History ==
The name is thought to derive from the Saxon name of Brydancumb or Bryda's Valley. At one time in antiquity the village was called South Burcombe and had a twin, North Burcombe, which stood on the north side of what is now the A30 road. Nothing remains of North Burcombe but the church.

Evidence of Neolithic or Bronze Age activity in the area includes, in the south of the parish, a round barrow at the top of a steep slope overlooking Punch Bowl Bottom, a deep valley in the downland with a semicircular head. Part of the northern boundary of Burcombe parish follows Grovely Ditch or Grim's Ditch, an Iron Age earthwork.

Small settlements at Bredecube (Burcombe) and Ocheforde (Ugford) were recorded in the 1086 Domesday survey, when some of the land was held by Wilton Abbey.

Ugford House is dated 1636. Much of the housing in Burcombe village was built by the Wilton estate, including Burcombe Manor, a farmhouse dated 1865.

The ancient parish of Burcombe extended further west towards Ditchampton and Wilton. In 1891 the parish of "Burcombe" had a population of 330. On 30 September 1894 the parish was abolished and split with the rural part going to form "Burcombe Without" and the rest going to Wilton. In 1885 Wilton's boundaries were enlarged to include part of Burcombe, which was known for a short time as Burcombe Within; in 1934 a further small part of Burcombe was transferred to Wilton.

Until 1884, North Ugford (comprising the present-day hamlet and an area of farmland, all north of the river) was part of South Newton parish. A church stood in the 13th century but there is no record of it after 1535. The 1934 enlargement of Wilton took some of the Ugford land, thus Wilton's western boundary is now just east of Ugford hamlet.

== Church of St John the Baptist ==
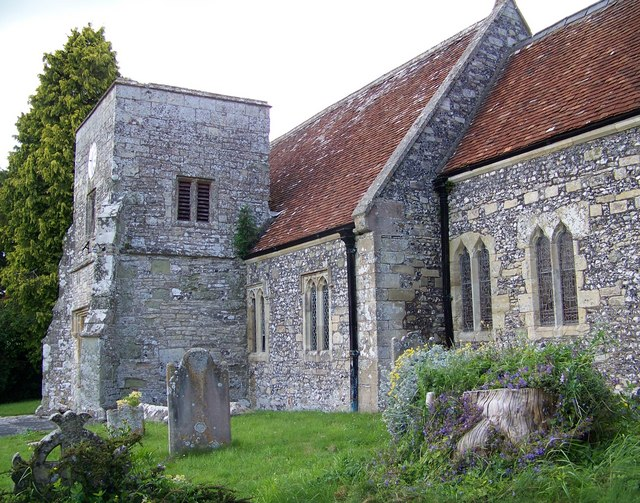
The church in 2008, with its stunted tower

The Church of England parish church of St John is built on higher ground near the A30 road, to the north of the village centre, it is assumed to protect it from the possibility of flooding from the river in the lower part of the valley. It was permitted by the Abbesses of Wilton and has features in the corner work of the masonry which indicate strongly that it was originally of Saxon construction, although it has undergone many changes, including restoration in 1859 by T.H. Wyatt. The church is unusual in that it has a tower, rebuilt in 1667, which is lower than the nave roof.

In 1960 the church was designated as a Grade II* listed building. It was declared redundant in 2005 and its sale was proposed in 2007.

== The Quaere placename ==
In the early 17th century, when John Speed prepared a map of Wiltshire he copied a version by Christopher Saxton, which showed but did not name North Burcombe. On his own map, Speed labelled the village Quaere (Latin for query), presumably because he intended to check the name later, but never did, and his engraver copied the annotation as if it were the village's name. Later map printers in turn copied Speed's map and 'Quaere' appeared on maps of Wiltshire for 145 years until Emanuel Bowen corrected the mistake in his 1755 map of the county.

== Amenities ==
The Ship Inn at Burcombe is a 17th-century village pub with whitewashed walls, low ceilings with oak beams and a large open fire. The village has a butcher's shop and a small suite of rented offices.
