= Combe Fishacre =

Village in Devon, England

Coordinates: 50°28′06″N 3°37′42″W

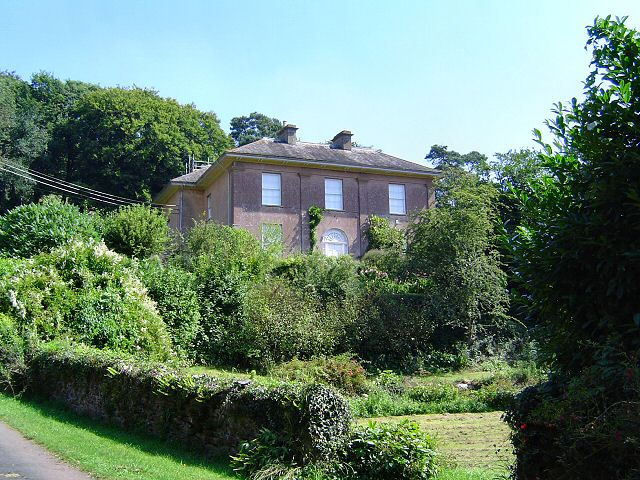
Combefishacre House

Combe Fishacre is a village in the English county of Devon.
