= Nettlecombe, Somerset =

Civil parish in Somerset, England

Coordinates: 51.132°N 3.349°W

Nettlecombe
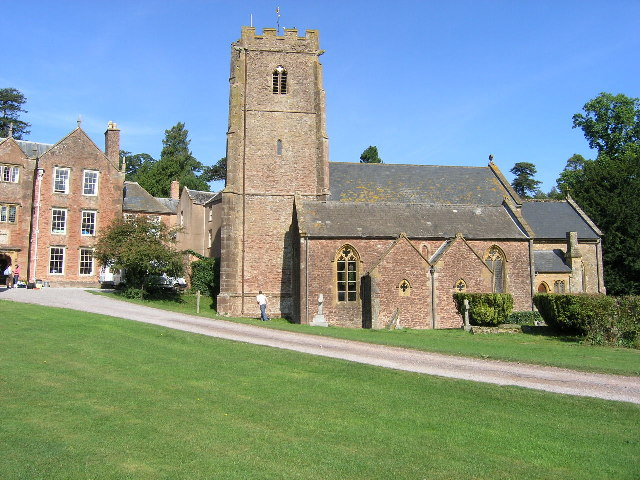
- Nettlecombe Court

- Location within Somerset
- Population: 426 (in 2021)
- OS grid reference: ST057378
- Civil parish: Nettlecombe
- Unitary authority: Somerset
- Ceremonial county: Somerset
- Region: South West
- Country: England
- Sovereign state: United Kingdom
- Post town: Taunton
- Postcode district: TA4
- Dialling code: 01984
- Police: Avon and Somerset
- Fire: Devon and Somerset
- Ambulance: South Western
- UK Parliament: Tiverton and Minehead
- Website: Parish Council

Nettlecombe is a civil parish in the English county of Somerset. The parish covers a rural area below the Brendon Hills, comprising the small hamlets of Beggearn Huish, Torre, Woodford, and Yarde, together with isolated individual farms and homes. The parish population at the 2021 census was 426.

The parish takes its name from Nettlecombe Court, an Elizabethan manor house which was once the manorial centre of the area. There are no shops or other services within the parish, which is instead served by the village of Williton, to the north-east.

== History ==
The manor was held before the Norman Conquest by Godwin, son of King Harold, and subsequently was the property of the crown. In 1160 it was granted to Hugh de Ralph and has never been sold since. It passed down through the family to John Trevelyan in 1481 and is still held by his successors.

The parish of Nettlecombe was part of the Williton and Freemanners Hundred.

== Governance ==
The parish council has responsibility for local issues, including setting an annual precept (local rate) to cover the council's operating costs and producing annual accounts for public scrutiny. The parish council evaluates local planning applications and works with the local police, district council officers, and neighbourhood watch groups on matters of crime, security, and traffic. The parish council's role also includes initiating projects for the maintenance and repair of parish facilities, as well as consulting with the district council on the maintenance, repair, and improvement of highways, drainage, footpaths, public transport, and street cleaning. Conservation matters (including trees and listed buildings) and environmental issues are also the responsibility of the council.

For local government purposes, since 1 April 2023, the parish comes under the unitary authority of Somerset Council. Prior to this, it was part of the non-metropolitan district of Somerset West and Taunton (formed on 1 April 2019) and, before this, the district of West Somerset (established under the Local Government Act 1972). It was part of Williton Rural District before 1974.

It is also part of the Tiverton and Minehead county constituency, represented in the House of Commons of the Parliament of the United Kingdom. It elects one member of parliament (MP) by the first past the post system of election.

== Religious sites ==
The Church of St Mary the Virgin dates from the thirteenth and fourteenth centuries, with further alterations since. It lies within the grounds of Nettlecombe Court, and has been designated as a grade I listed building.

== Climate ==
Nettlecombe

Climate chart (precipitation, max. and min. temperature)
J	F	M	A	M	J	J	A	S	O	N	D
118 8 2	84 8 2	79 11 3	70 13 4	67 16 7	56 19 9	61 21 11	67 21 11	76 18 9	117 15 7	115 11 4	123 9 2
- █ Average max. and min. temperatures in °C
- █ Precipitation totals in mm
Imperial conversion
J	F	M	A	M	J	J	A	S	O	N	D
4.7 47 36	3.3 47 35	3.1 51 38	2.7 55 39	2.6 61 44	2.2 66 49	2.4 70 52	2.6 69 52	3 65 49	4.6 58 45	4.5 52 40	4.8 47 36
- █ Average max. and min. temperatures in °F
- █ Precipitation totals in inches

Along with the rest of South West England, Nettlecombe has a temperate climate which is generally wetter and milder than the rest of England. The annual mean temperature is about 10 °C (50 °F) with seasonal and diurnal variations, but due to the modifying effect of the sea, the range is less than in most other parts of the United Kingdom. January is the coldest month with mean minimum temperatures between 1 and 2 °C (34 and 36 °F). July and August are the warmest months in the region with mean daily maxima around 21 °C (70 °F). In general, December is the dullest month and June the sunniest. The south west of England enjoys a favoured location, particularly in summer, when the Azores High extends its influence north-eastwards towards the UK.

Cloud often forms inland, especially near hills, and reduces exposure to sunshine. The average annual sunshine totals around 1,600 hours. Rainfall tends to be associated with Atlantic depressions or with convection. In summer, convection caused by solar surface heating sometimes forms shower clouds and a large proportion of the annual precipitation falls from showers and thunderstorms at this time of year. Average rainfall is around 800–900 mm (31–35 in). About 8–15 days of snowfall is typical. November to March have the highest mean wind speeds, with June to August having the lightest. The predominant wind direction is from the south-west.
