= Grade I listed buildings in West Somerset =

West Somerset is a former local government district in the English county of Somerset. In the United Kingdom, the term listed building refers to a building or other structure officially designated as being of special architectural, historical or cultural significance; Grade I structures are those considered to be "buildings of exceptional interest". Listing was begun by a provision in the Town and Country Planning Act 1947. Once listed, severe restrictions are imposed on the modifications allowed to a building's structure or its fittings. In England, the authority for listing under the Planning (Listed Buildings and Conservation Areas) Act 1990 rests with Historic England, a non-departmental public body sponsored by the Department for Digital, Culture, Media and Sport; local authorities have a responsibility to regulate and enforce the planning regulations.

The district of West Somerset covers a largely rural area, with a population, according to the 2011 census, of 35,300 in an area of 740 square kilometres (290 sq mi). The largest centres of population are the coastal towns of Minehead and Watchet. The council's administrative headquarters are in the village of Williton.

There are 33 Grade I listed buildings in West Somerset. The oldest is either Culbone Church, one of the smallest churches in England, and pre-Norman in origin, or Tarr Steps, which may originate in the Bronze Age, although other sources date them from around 1400. Dunster has the greatest concentration of Grade I listed buildings, including Dunster Castle, which was built in 1617 on a site which had supported a castle for the previous 600 years; the Yarn Market, which was built in 1609; Gallox Bridge, which dates from the 15th century and the Priory Church of St George which is predominantly from the 15th century but includes part of the earlier church on the same site. Other sites include manor houses such as the medieval buildings at Nettlecombe Court and Orchard Wyndham. Somerset has many religious structures, most of which are from the Norman or medieval eras. Some of the churches are part of the Somerset towers, a collection mostly spireless Gothic church towers.

== Buildings ==
Name	Location	Type	Completed (Note: The date given is the date used by Historic England as significant for the initial building or that of an important part in the structure's description.)	Grid ref. (Note: The grid reference is based on the British national grid reference system, sometimes known as OSGB36, used by the Ordnance Survey.) Geo-coordinates	Entry number (Note: The "List Entry Number" is a unique number assigned to each listed building and scheduled monument by Historic England.)	Image	Ref.
All Saints Church	Dodington	Parish Church	15th century	ST1719840561; 51°09′30″N 3°11′08″W	1057420	All Saints Church More images	
Bratton Court	Minehead Without	Manor House	14th century	SS9460346291; 51°12′22″N 3°30′36″W	1174996	Bratton Court More images	
Church of All Saints	Monksilver	Parish Church	12th century	ST0727937429; 51°07′43″N 3°19′35″W	1296069	Church of All Saints More images	
Church of All Saints	Selworthy	Parish Church	14th century	SS9198446807; 51°12′37″N 3°32′52″W	1296005	Church of All Saints More images	
Church of All Saints	Wootton Courtenay	Parish Church	13th century	SS9383143437; 51°10′49″N 3°31′13″W	1345750	Church of All Saints More images	
Church of St Andrew	Old Cleeve	Parish Church	12th century	ST0409741914; 51°10′06″N 3°22′23″W	1295868	Church of St Andrew More images	
Church of St Andrew	Stogursey	Parish Church	1107	ST2047442876; 51°10′46″N 3°08′21″W	1057404	Church of St Andrew More images	
Church of St Decuman	Watchet	Parish Church	13th century	ST0649842709; 51°10′33″N 3°20′20″W	1057662	Church of St Decuman More images	
Church of St Dubricius	Porlock	Parish Church	13th century	SS8863946664; 51°12′30″N 3°35′44″W	1173524	Church of St Dubricius More images	
Church of St George	Bicknoller	Parish Church	15th century	ST1107539428; 51°08′50″N 3°16′22″W	1057465	Church of St George More images	
Church of St John the Baptist	Carhampton	Parish Church	1863	ST0093042658; 51°10′28″N 3°25′07″W	1345731	Church of St John the Baptist More images	
Church of St Mary	Luccombe	Parish Church	c. 1300	SS9109044521; 51°11′22″N 3°33′35″W	1057328	Church of St Mary More images	
Church of St Mary	Stogumber	Parish Church	13th century	ST0981237291; 51°07′40″N 3°17′25″W	1057500	Church of St Mary More images	
Church of St Mary Magdalene	Winsford	Parish Church	13th century	SS9046134986; 51°06′13″N 3°33′57″W	1174169	Church of St Mary Magdalene More images	
Church of St Mary the Virgin	Nettlecombe	Parish Church	13th century	ST0568337749; 51°07′52″N 3°20′57″W	1173837	Church of St Mary the Virgin More images	
Church of St Nicholas	Brushford	Parish Church	15th century	SS9194925738; 51°01′15″N 3°32′31″W	1263949	Church of St Nicholas More images	
Church of St Nicholas	Withycombe	Parish Church	13th century	ST0153041301; 51°09′45″N 3°24′35″W	1057311	Church of St Nicholas More images	
Church of St Peter	Huish Champflower	Parish Church	15th century	ST0491029200; 51°03′15″N 3°21′29″W	1248030	Church of St Peter More images	
Church of St Petrock	Timberscombe	Parish Church	15th century	SS9559742055; 51°10′05″N 3°29′41″W	1057303	Church of St Petrock More images	
Church of the Holy Ghost	Crowcombe	Parish Church	14th century	ST1407336710; 51°07′24″N 3°13′45″W	1174327	Church of the Holy Ghost More images	
Cleeve Abbey	Washford	Remains of Cistercian abbey	1198	ST0474440703; 51°09′27″N 3°21′49″W	1057579	Cleeve Abbey More images	
Combe Sydenham	Stogumber	Manor House	Late 15th century	ST0761236743; 51°07′21″N 3°19′17″W	1057497	Combe Sydenham More images	
Court House	East Quantoxhead	Manor House	1614	ST1364243687; 51°11′09″N 3°14′13″W	1057409	Court House More images	
Crowcombe Court and attached stables to west	Crowcombe	Country House	1793	ST1399536916; 51°07′30″N 3°13′49″W	1345656	Crowcombe Court and attached stables to west More images	
Culbone Church	Culbone	Parish Church	Pre-Norman	SS8421648226; 51°13′17″N 3°39′34″W	1058037	Culbone Church More images	
Dunster Castle and gatehouse	Dunster	Castle	11th century	SS9919643490; 51°10′54″N 3°26′37″W	1057643	Dunster Castle and gatehouse More images	
Gallox Bridge	Dunster		15th century	SS9895143213; 51°10′45″N 3°26′49″W	1296207	Gallox Bridge More images	
Gatehouse and barn abutting west end at Bratton Court	Minehead Without	Gatehouse and barn	14th century	SS9461946319; 51°12′23″N 3°30′36″W	1345727	Gatehouse and barn abutting west end at Bratton Court More images	
Nettlecombe Court (Leonard Wills Field Centre)	Nettlecombe		Late medieval	ST0564637755; 51°07′53″N 3°20′59″W	1173856	Nettlecombe Court (Leonard Wills Field Centre) More images	
Orchard Wyndham and belvedere adjoining to north east	Williton	Country House	Medieval	ST0721439931; 51°09′04″N 3°19′41″W	1295578	Orchard Wyndham and belvedere adjoining to north east More images	
Priory Church of St George	Dunster	Parish Church	15th century	SS9903943663; 51°11′00″N 3°26′45″W	1057646	Priory Church of St George More images	
Tarr Steps	Dulverton	Clapper bridge	Medieval	SS8677032116; 51°04′38″N 3°37′04″W	1247822	Tarr Steps More images	
Yarn Market	Dunster		1609	SS9915243812; 51°11′05″N 3°26′40″W	1173428	Yarn Market More images	

== See also ==
- List of Grade I listed buildings in Somerset
- List of towers in Somerset
