= St Petrock's Church =

St Petrock's or St Petroc's Church may refer to:

- St Petroc's Church, Bodmin
- St Petroc's Church, Egloshayle
- St Petrock's Church, Exeter
- St Petrock's Church, Parracombe
- St Petrock's Church, Timberscombe
