= Church of All Saints, Wootton Courtenay =

Church in Somerset, England

Church of All Saints
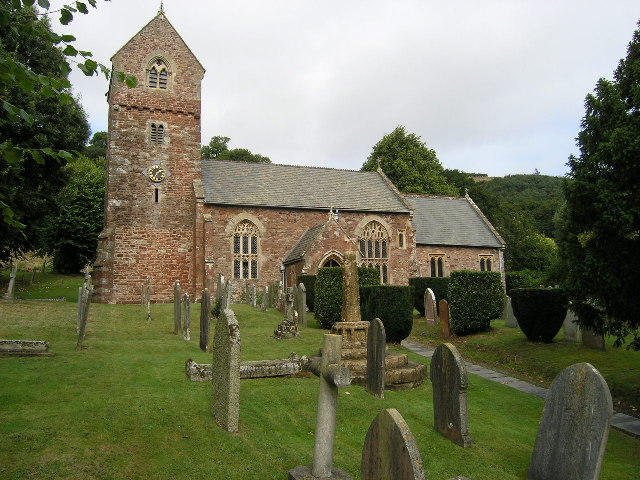

- Location within Somerset

General information
- Location: Wootton Courtenay, England
- Coordinates: 51.1802°N 3.5204°W
- Completed: 13th century

The Church of All Saints in Wootton Courtenay, Somerset, England, dates from the 13th century and has been designated as a Grade I listed building.

A previous church on the site was given to the Priory of St. Andrews of the Ards in the 12th century. The three-bay nave, chancel and four-stage tower survive from the 13th century. They were built of local red sandstone with Hamstone dressings. In the 15th century the nave was given a new roof and the north aisle was added around the same time. Major restoration was undertaken in the 19th century when the porch was rebuilt and the height of the tower increased. Much of the woodwork in the church was carved by local craftsmen. In 1964 the roof had to be replaced because of deathwatch beetle. Inside the church is a 15th-century iron bound chest which was used to secure the plate and other valuables of the church. The stained glass is from the 19th century.

In the churchyard is an early 15th-century cross. The calvary at the top was replaced in the mid 19th century.

The parish is part of the benefice of Dunster, Carhampton, Withycombe with Roduish, Timberscombe and Wootton Courtenay within the Exmoor deanery.

== See also ==
- Grade I listed buildings in West Somerset
- List of Somerset towers
- List of ecclesiastical parishes in the Diocese of Bath and Wells
