= Church of All Saints, Monksilver =

Church in Somerset, England

Church of All Saints
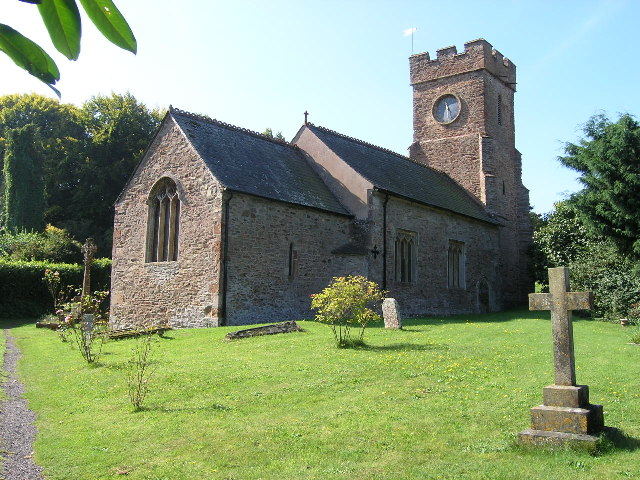
- Church of All Saints in 2007

- Location within Somerset

General information
- Location: Monksilver, England
- Coordinates: 51.1286°N 3.3263°W
- Completed: 12th century

The Church of All Saints in Monksilver, Somerset, England dates from the 12th century and has been designated by English Heritage as a Grade I listed building. The church has a square west tower, built in the 14th century,

== Architecture ==
The church shows fragments of 12th-century masonry and the tower at the west end is 14th-century. It is built of red sandstone with a slate roof with decorative ridge tiles. The plan consists of a four bay nave, south aisle, chancel, south chapel and south porch. The tower has three stages with crenelations on top which were added during restoration between 1843 and 1863, at which time the south chapel was also added. There is a ring of five bells including one by Roger Semson of Ash Priors which was cast between 1530 and 1570. The interior is whitewashed, the nave having a wagon roof which is thought to be 13th-century and an alms box by the door is from 1634. There is also an extremely rare Easter Sepulchre, which resembles a tomb, dating to before the Reformation. There is a 12th-century window on the north side of the chancel. The pulpit is sixteenth-century, the screen is Jacobean and the lectern is possibly older. The south aisle has "some of the most entertaining gargoyles in the county".

The yew tree in the churchyard is believed to date from 1770. There is a historic cross dated 1863 in the churchyard, just south of the chancel, which is a Grade II listed structure.

In 1583 the church was the venue for the marriage of Sir Francis Drake and his second wife Elizabeth Sydenham of nearby Combe Sydenham in the parish of Stogumber.

The parish is part of the Quantock Towers benefice within the Quantock deanery.

== See also ==
- Grade I listed buildings in West Somerset
- List of Somerset towers
- List of ecclesiastical parishes in the Diocese of Bath and Wells
