= Combe Sydenham =

Historic manor in Somerset, England

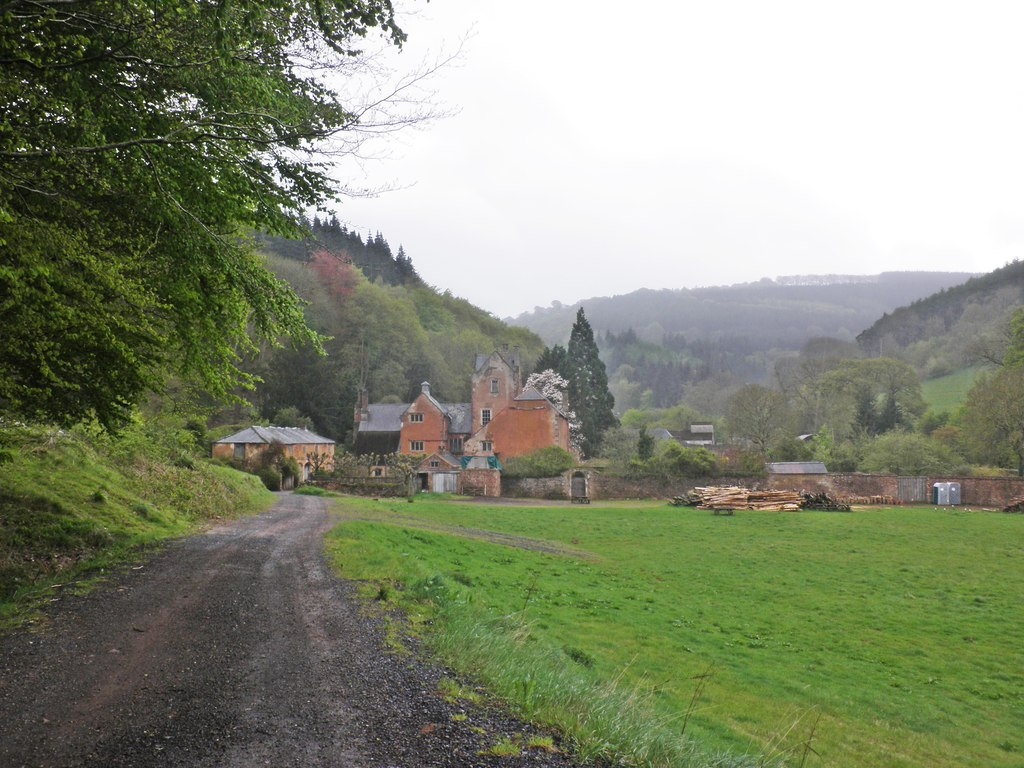
Setting of Combe Sydenham

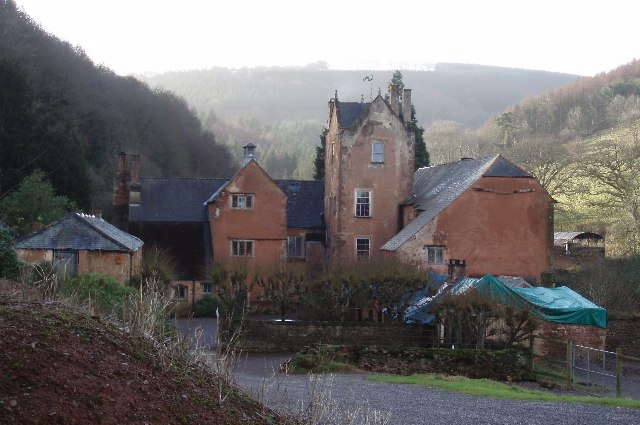
Combe Sydenham Hall

Combe Sydenham is an historic manor in Somerset, England. The 15th-century manor house, called Combe Sydenham House is in the parish of Stogumber, Somerset and is situated just within the boundary of Exmoor National Park. It is a Grade I listed building.

== Restoration and additions ==
The porch was added in 1580 to the south front of the building. The west front was re-fenestrated, and at least two stair turrets were added in about 1600. The south front has been re-fenestrated and buildings to the north and east were demolished.

== Estate ==
The house is set in a 500 acres (200 ha) estate which contains a deer park and a variety of walks.

== History ==
=== de Moyon/Mohun ===
Combe Sydenham is mentioned in the Domesday Book of 1086 as one of the many manors held by William de Moyon, 1st feudal baron of Dunster, seated at nearby Dunster Castle, Somerset.

=== Sydenham ===
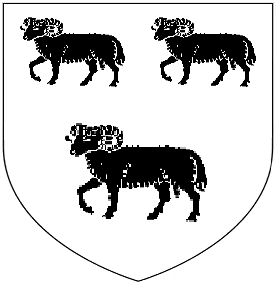
Arms of Sydenham: Argent, three rams passant guardant sable

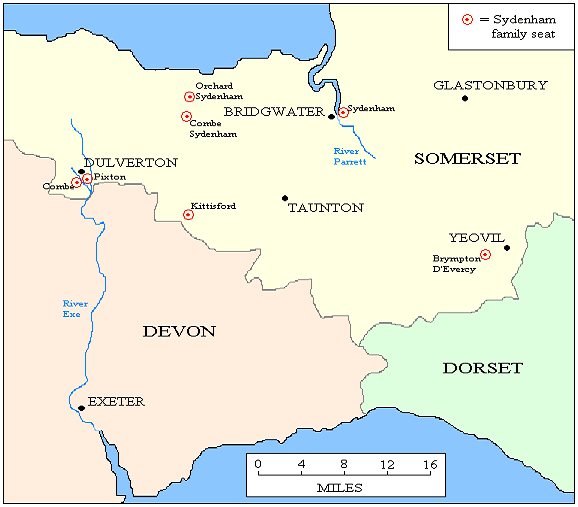
Map showing locations of historic seats of the Sydenham family of Somerset: Sydenham; Orchard Sydenham; Combe Sydenham; Brympton D'Evercy; Combe, Dulverton; Pixton

Combe Sydenham Hall was the home of a junior branch of the Sydenham family of Sydenham, Bridgwater, from the 15th century to 1693. In 1585, Admiral Sir Francis Drake (c.1540-1596) married Elizabeth Sydenham (born c.1562), the only child and sole heiress of Sir George Sydenham (d.1597), of Combe Sydenham, the Sheriff of Somerset, whose monument, with effigy, survives in the Sydenham Chapel of Stogumber Church. Before the marriage, however, Drake left on a long voyage and her father arranged for her to be married instead to a son of the Wyndham family of nearby Orchard Wyndham. Tradition states that, on the wedding day, as the couple approached the Church of St Mary at Stogumber, a loud clap of thunder was heard and a large meteorite crashed through the roof. This was seen as a bad omen and the wedding was cancelled. Drake had arrived back in Plymouth on that same day and they were later married at the Church of All Saints in Monksilver. The 14 inches (360 mm) diameter iron meteorite, known as "Drake's cannon ball", has remained at the house ever since and has become smooth from being rolled on the ground. After Drake's death in 1596, Elizabeth Sydenham was remarried to Sir William V Courtenay (1553–1630) of Powderham, Devon, as his second wife.

Sir John Sydenham, 1st Baronet (c. 1620–1643) married a certain Alice, but died before the birth of his son and heir, Sir John Posthumous Sydenham, 2nd Baronet (1643–1696). His widow was remarried to Sir Francis Dodington, who resided at Combe Sydenham as a Royalist during the Civil War and, in 1651, during his tenure, Combe Sydenham was confiscated by the Parliamentarians. Parliament purported to sell Combe Sydenham to John Ware but, following the 1660 Restoration of the Monarchy, it was restored to the 2nd Baronet, who in 1693 sold the entire estate to George Musgrave (d. 1721).

=== Musgrave ===
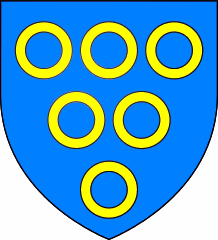
Arms of Musgrave of Musgrave, Hartley and Edenhall in Cumberland: Azure, six annulets three, two, one, or These are the arms of Baron Musgrave created 1350, being a difference of the arms of Vipont, the powerful Westmorland family and overlords whose many feudal tenants and followers adopted for arms variants of Vipont

Several monuments to the Musgrave family survive in the "Sydenham Chapel" (South Aisle Chapel) of Stogumber Church, which display the arms of Musgrave (Azure, six annulets three, two, one, or). The Musgrave family was previously seated, for most of the 17th century, at Huish Barton in the parish of Nettlecombe, Somerset, in which house is a plaster overmantel displaying the date 1698 and the monogram of the Musgraves. William Musgrave (1655–1721) of Exeter, a physician and antiquary, was the youngest son of Richard Musgrave of Nettlecombe. He attended the Trevelyan family of Nettlecombe Court, long time lords of the manor of Nettlecombe, and wrote several treatises on arthritis and four volumes of Antiquitates Brittanno-Belgicae. The descent of Combe Sydenham in the Musgrave family was as follows:

- George I Musgrave (d.1721), who in 1693 purchased Combe Sydenham from Sir John Posthumous Sydenham, 2nd Baronet (d. 1696). In 1671, he married Juliana Beare (born 1651), a daughter of Thomas Beare (1631–1680), lord of the manor of Huntsham, Devon. His mural monument in Stogumber Church, sculpted on slate, shows the quartered arms of Musgrave impaling the canting arms of Beare (Argent, three bear's heads erased sable muzzled or), here shown couped, not erased, quartering the canting arms of Clavell (de Claville), of Burlescombe, Devon & Loman Clavell of Uplowman, Devon (Or, three keys gules).
- George II Musgrave (d. 1724)
- George III Musgrave (1717–1742), of Nettlecombe, Somerset. In 1740, at Sherwell in North Devon, he married Catherine Chichester, eldest daughter of Sir John Chichester, 4th Baronet (1689–1740) of Youlston Park, Sherwell. He died aged 25, and his mural monument in Stogumber Church was erected by his daughter, and eventual heiress, Juliana Musgrave.
- Thomas Musgrave (1741–1766), son and heir, who died unmarried, aged 25 like his father. In 1765 he gave Combe Sydenham to his sister, Juliana Musgrave.
- Juliana Musgrave (Lady Langham) who, after 1765, married Sir James Langham, 7th Baronet (1736–1795). In 1796, following her husband's death, she sold Combe Sydenham to George Notley of Chillington.

=== Notley ===
The descent of Combe Sydenham in the Notley family between 1796 and 1958 was as follows:

- George Notley (d.1831) of Chillington House, Somerset (which he had purchased in about 1766), purchased Combe Sydenham from Lady Langham, née Juliana Musgrave, in 1796 and, circa 1800, acquired the adjoining manor of Monksilver. The present public house in Monksilver is called the "Notley Arms" and displays on its sign the armorials of Notley (Or, on a bend cotised azure three bezants) quartering Marwood (Gules, a chevron between three goat's heads erased ermine attired or). In 1800, as part of his marriage settlement, he settled part of the estate on his wife Mary Marwood (d.1829), who predeceased her husband, whereupon her share reverted to him. Mary was heiress to her brother James Thomas Benedictus Marwood (d.1811), a lunatic, of Widworthy Barton, whose mural monument survives in Widworthy Church, Devon.
- James I Thomas Benedictus Notley (d.1851), 2nd son, his elder brother, George Notley (d.1857), being a lunatic who was legally incapable of owning property.
- James II Thomas Benedictus Notley (d.1872), 2nd son, his elder brother George Notley having been "sent abroad to Belgium". He died without progeny.
- Marwood I Notley (1833–1903), younger brother and heir, who had a common law wife Matilda Venn Poole, by whom he had 9 children. He bequeathed his estates jointly to his two youngest sons Montague Notley (born 1878) and Marwood II Notley (1880-c.1958), the latter of whom received, as his share, Combe Sydenham.
- Marwood II Notley (1880-c.1958), youngest son, who left a daughter and sole heiress Molly Louise Rosewell who, in 1958, sold the estate to Group Captain E. G. Campbell-Voullaire, Royal Air Force.

=== Campbell-Voullaire ===
Group Captain E. G. Campbell-Voullaire, Royal Air Force, after a distinguished service during World War II, purchased Combe Sydenham from the Notley heiress in 1958. He noted that "it had been terribly run down, and he was putting it all together again". He employed as his farm manager the young John Edwards (b.1926), recently qualified in agriculture at Seale-Hayne College near Exeter, Devon. Edwards went on to farm for himself at Westermill Farm on Exmoor and to serve as a county councillor, an active member of the National Farmers Union, and as a member of the Exmoor National Park Committee since 1972. He stated of his time at Combe Sydenham:

"And that really was an experience, being farm manager for somebody like Voullaire. He was an extraordinary man, but (we) have remained very good friends ever since because he's such a remarkable man. But incredible difficult. It was very interesting, and very interesting...coping with a rather difficult employer. But he thinks they both respected each other, and he found that interesting. He saw the job written up and applied. Campbell-Voullaire had a succession of farm managers and (Edwards and his wife) were easily the longest inhabitants. He was only just over a year there. As farm manager at Combe Sydenham he worked bloody hard. Running the farm. Peter Batchelor from Exford used to work for them. He was the shepherd. They had a cowman and a tractor driver and one other chap, so he had to organise them. And there was corn, cows, sheep, beef. The estate was about 500 acres he thinks, but Campbell-Voullaire was taking in more and more land and putting the estate back together again, putting a lot of money into it. And woodland. Which they didn't actually have anything to do with. Campbell-Voullaire wasn't really interested. Whereas Theed, who has now bought it, has done the opposite. No, there wasn't a working mill there in those days, though there is now of course because Theed has put that in order. It was just an ordinary Williton area farm. Good land, steep land but a good bit of ground. And they did quite a bit of reclamation, on the steep ground. They had Sid Sherring doing a lot of the steep work. It was a very good experience. Very interesting."

=== Theed ===
- William A.C. Theed purchased Combe Sydenham in 1979. His estate at Combe Sydenham includes 130 hectares of commercial woodland, which are open to public access for various leisure activities such as off-road vehicle and mountain biking. In 2012, he won the Royal Forestry Society Duke of Cornwall Multipurpose Woodlands Award.

=== 2020 sale ===
In 2020, substantial forest land near Combe Sydenham was sold to SMH Woodland Ltd, a UK company believed to be controlled by Lord Hintze, an Anglo-Australian landowner, philanthropist and investor, while the sporting rights were sold separately to a London-based investment group. <inadequate citation>

== See also ==
- Grade I listed buildings in West Somerset
