= Church of the Holy Ghost, Crowcombe =

Church in Somerset, England

Church of the Holy Ghost
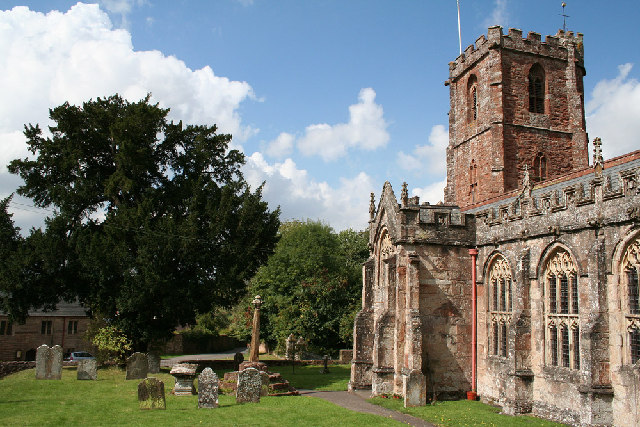

- Location within Somerset

General information
- Location: Crowcombe, England
- Coordinates: 51.1233°N 3.2294°W
- Completed: 15th century

The Church of the Holy Ghost in Crowcombe, Somerset, England has a tower dating from the 14th century with the rest of the building being dated at the 15th century. It has been designated by Historic England as a Grade I listed building.

There was a previous church on the site, possible dating from the Saxon era. The north chapel is known as the Carew Chapel and was used by the lords of the manor who lived in the nearby Crowcombe Court.

In 1724 the spire was damaged by a lightning strike. The top section of the spire was removed and is now planted in the churchyard and stone from the spire was used in the flooring of the church. Inside the church carved bench-ends, dating from 1534, depict such pagan subjects as the Green Man and the legend of the men of Crowcombe fighting a two-headed dragon.

In the churchyard is a medieval cross. The octagonal 2.8 metres (9 ft 2 in) high shaft sits on a base of three steps. It has been scheduled as an ancient monument.

The parish is part of the Quantock Towers benefice within the Quantock deanery.

Opposite the church is the Church House and Pound which was built around 1515 for parish functions. It is a Grade II* listed building and was refurbished in 2007.

The family of noted Battle of Britain pilot Peter Townsend (later linked romantically with Princess Margaret) lived in Crowcombe during Townsend's teenage years. In a memoir of his youth, he writes movingly of his father's death in the family home, when Townsend was 19, and of the care shown the family by the Congregation:

They came, the village sexton and the pall-bearers, to the house, bringing with them a simple, old-fashioned bier – a hand-barrow upon which they set my father’s coffin. Through the village they took him on his last journey to the church where, as evening fell, they laid him before the altar. [When, the evening before the service, Townsend and one of his sisters paid a last, private, homage to their father] . . . peace filled the little mediaeval church, with its narrow pews and oaken benches, lavishly carved at their ends, where we had worshipped at my father’s side. Beside our pew, in the aisle, a stone slab marked the vault of the Sweeting family . . . They buried my father next day . . . I led the little cortège down the aisle. The massive oak door creaked open and we moved out into the sunlight . . . I am glad that my father – and, later, my mother – were laid to rest in Crowcombe, for the village . . . entered into my soul. I felt a regular villager. With my father at rest in the bosom of his beloved West Country, I again took to the air.

== See also ==
- Grade I listed buildings in West Somerset
- List of Somerset towers
- List of ecclesiastical parishes in the Diocese of Bath and Wells
