= Church of St Mary Magdalene, Winsford =

Church in Somerset, England

Church of St Mary Magdalene
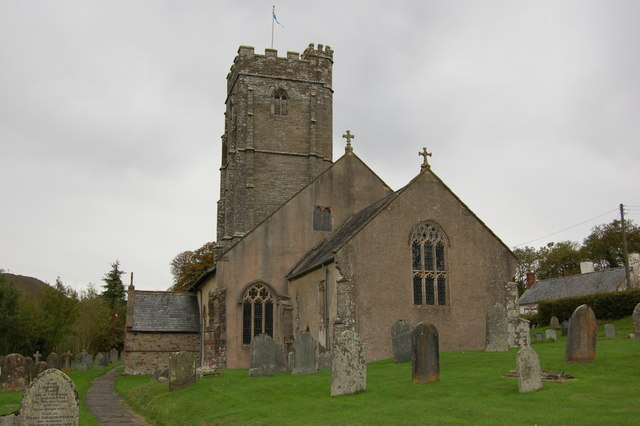

- Location within Somerset

General information
- Location: Winsford, England
- Coordinates: 51.1037°N 3.5659°W
- Completed: 13th century

The Church of St Mary Magdalene in Winsford, Somerset, England, dates back to the Norman period before the 13th century and has been designated by English Heritage as a Grade I listed building.

Winsford church is dedicated to St Mary Magdalene and was partly restored in 1858. The tower, which is 90 feet (27.4 m) high, was constructed in three stages. There are six bells; the four heaviest were made by Thomas Bilbie in Cullompton in 1765.

Within the church is a fine painted panel created in 1609 during the reign of King James I. The ironwork on the inner doors of the church is thought to date from the 13th century, originating from the priory of St Nichola in Barlynch, and the font is from the Norman period. The organ was installed c. 1900, being delivered by horse-drawn wagon from nearby Dulverton. The church register dates back to 1660.

== See also ==
- Grade I listed buildings in West Somerset
- List of Somerset towers
- List of ecclesiastical parishes in the Diocese of Bath and Wells
