= Church of St Nicholas, Withycombe =

Church in Somerset, England

Church of St Nicholas
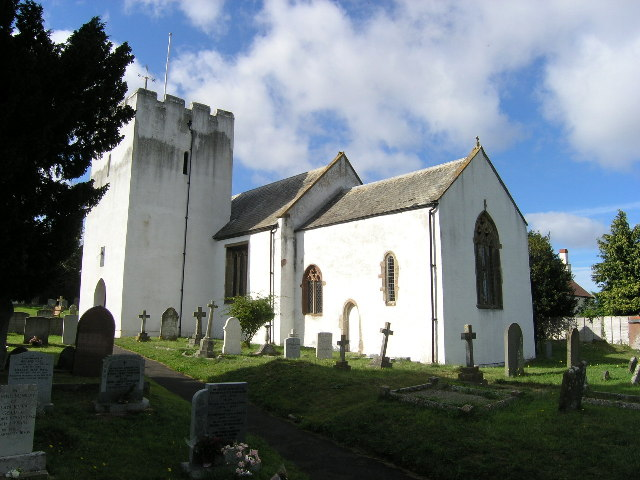

- Location within Somerset

General information
- Location: Withycombe, England
- Coordinates: 51.1642°N 3.4100°W
- Completed: 13th century

The Church of St Nicholas in Withycombe, Somerset, England dates from the 13th century and has been designated by English Heritage as a Grade I listed building.

The tower was built in the 14th century, although there is some stonework in the north wall which dates from the 12th century and was part of an earlier building. The nave was refenestrated in the 15th century. The tower was repaired in the early 19th century when the gallery was also moved. Further restoration was carried out in the 1850s, when oil lighting was installed and further restored and re-roofed 1912 to 1913. The vestry was extended and the west end gallery removed 1934–1936.

Hidden in a wall recess is a figure of an unknown man with long hair and a hat, which is one of the earliest church monuments to include a hat. He is carrying a heart-shaped case to show he died elsewhere and only his heart was brought to the church for burial.

The parish is part of the benefice of Dunster, Carhampton, Withycombe with Roduish, Timberscombe and Wootton Courtenay within the Exmoor deanery.

== See also ==
- Grade I listed buildings in West Somerset
- List of Somerset towers
- List of ecclesiastical parishes in the Diocese of Bath and Wells
