= Alice Chestre =

Alice Chestre (sometimes written "Chester" or "Chestour") (died 1485) was a merchant and a benefactor of the city of Bristol, England. She married Henry Chestre (or Chester), a draper who traded in Spain, Lisbon, Bordeaux and Brittany, exporting cloth and importing other goods. He was the third son of Robert Chester of Stow St Edward.

Henry died on 14 February 1471, while he was Mayor of Bristol. After a few benefactions, he left all of his possessions to Alice in his short will. Alice took over her husband's business after his death. As a businesswoman, she was a trader like her deceased husband, and imported iron and wine from Spain while exporting textiles to Ireland, Lisbon, Spain, and Flanders, often in her own ships. She amassed a very large fortune in this manner and donated freely to both her city and her local parish church, that of All Saints, Bristol.

Most of her donations were ecclesiastical. She donated a house in Broad Street to All Saints, established a chantry for her husband, commissioned a weekly Jesus mass and two anniversary masses for her husband. She also gave her church numerous embroideries (including a black and gold hearse cloth for funerals, bearing the words "Orate pro animabus Henrici Chester et Aliciae uxoris eius" ), ornate altar fronts, plate, a silver cross, and paid for a new rood loft. The church's record of benefactors refers to her, somewhat effusively, as "this blessed woman". In religious terms, she was a pious woman who was dedicated to the emergent cultus of the holy name of Jesus. As a widow, she was vigorously engaged in the world of business affairs and civic duties. She gave the Port of Bristol a crane in 1475, at the Welsh Back which is the first evidence of a crane in the port. Record of the construction can be seen in the churchwardens' accounts for All Saints' church (Ref. P/AS/Chw/1) (online catalogue), held by Bristol Archives, which are currently on display at the M Shed museum.

In November 1472, she commissioned a carpenter, Stephen Morgan, to rebuild a house in the High Street, next to the Bull Inn (later the Angel Inn). Extraordinarily, the building contract survives in the parish collection of All Saints' church (Ref. P/AS/D/HS/C/9) (online catalogue), in the collections of Bristol Archives, currently on display at M Shed museum. The timber-framed house was completed in March the following year, with a shop on the ground floor, a hall above with an oriel window, a chamber above the hall with another oriel window, and another chamber above the first. The house is shown in drawings and photographs made before it collapsed in 1865.

One of her sons was Prior of Barlynch Priory in Somerset. A second son inherited her house in High Street, and later donated it to All Saints.
