= Septimus Ridsdale =

English cricketer and civil servant

Personal information
- Full name: Septimus Otter Barnes Ridsdale
- Born: 2 August 1840; Crowcombe, Somerset, England
- Died: 15 November 1884 (aged 44); Fatehpur, North-Western Provinces, British India
- Batting: Unknown

Domestic team information
- Years: Team
- 1862: Oxford University

Career statistics
Competition	First-class
Matches	2
Runs scored	29
Batting average	7.25
100s/50s	–/–
Top score	28
Catches/stumpings	2/–
- Source: Cricinfo, 10 March 2020

Septimus Otter Barnes Ridsdale (2 August 1840 – 15 October 1884) was an English first-class cricketer and an officer in the Indian Civil Service.

The son of George William Hughes Ridsdale, he was born in August 1840 at Crowcombe, Somerset. He was educated at Tonbridge School, before going up to Wadham College, Oxford. While studying at Oxford, he made two appearances in first-class cricket for Oxford University in 1862 against the Marylebone Cricket Club and Cambridge University in The University Match. Ridsdale was also a member of the Oxford University Boat Club and was a cox for the winning Oxford team in the 1861 Boat Race.

After graduating from Oxford, Ridsdale entered into the Indian Civil Service later in 1861. While traveling to Indian to take up his post, he was noted for saving the life of a man who fallen into the Nile, for which he was awarded a medal by the Royal Humane Society. He eventually rose to the position of officiating commissioner for Berar Province. Ridsdale died in British India at Fatehpur in October 1884.
