= Roebuck Meadows =

- Site of Special Scientific Interest
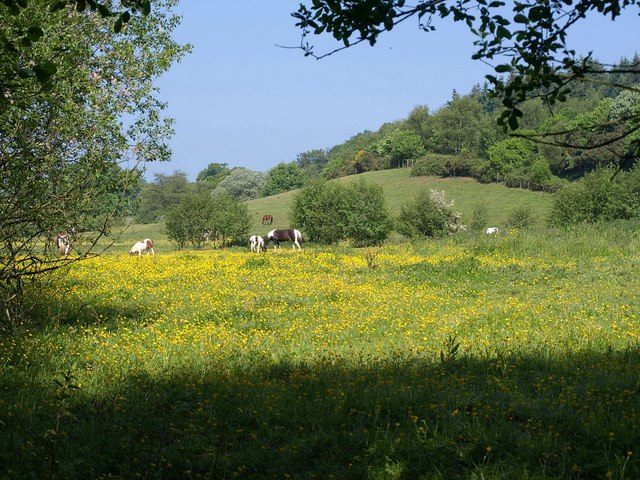

- Location within Somerset
- Location of Roebuck Meadows.
- Area of search: Somerset
- Grid reference: ST132354
- Coordinates: 51.11130°N 3.24133°W
- Interest: Biological
- Area: 3.6 hectares (0.036 km^{2}; 0.014 sq mi)
- Notification date: 1988

Roebuck Meadows (grid reference ST132354) is a 3.6 hectare (8.9 acre) biological Site of Special Scientific Interest south of Crowcombe in Somerset, notified in 1988.

Roebuck Meadows have a very varied and herb-rich vegetation composed of mire and grassland communities together comprising an important example of lowland mire, which is a nationally scarce habitat. The meadows contain Cornish moneywort (Sibthorpia europaea), a nationally scarce plant restricted to south-west Britain.
