= Stogumber railway station =

Heritage railway station in Somerset, England

Stogumber
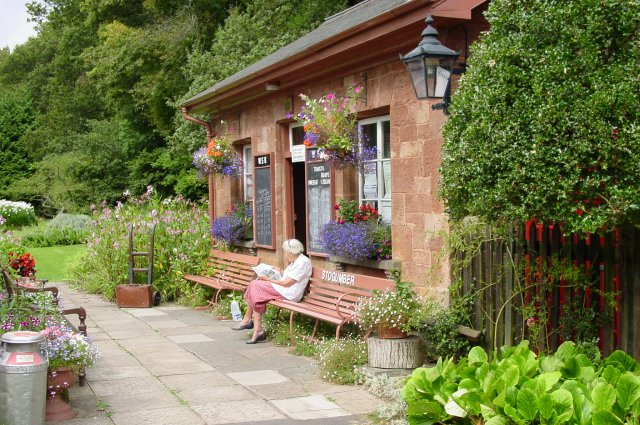

General information
- Location: Stogumber, Somerset; England
- Coordinates: 51.1274°N 3.2722°W
- Grid reference: ST110372
- System: Station on heritage railway
- Operator: West Somerset Railway
- Platforms: 1

History
- Original company: West Somerset Railway
- Post-grouping: Great Western Railway

Key dates
- 1862: Opened
- 1971: Closed
- 1978: Opened in preservation
Location

Stogumber railway station is a station in Kingswood, Somerset, England which serves the nearby village of Stogumber. It was opened by the West Somerset Railway in 1862 and closed by British Rail early in 1971. It was subsequently reopened in 1978 by the West Somerset Railway, a heritage line. It has a different layout to most stations, in that the main building lies on the opposite side of the tracks to the platform.

== History ==
The station was first opened on 31 March 1862 when the West Somerset Railway was brought into use between Norton Junction and Watchet. The small station building was put on the east side of the track and the platform on the west; access between the two was across a pedestrian level crossing. A loop line served a goods shed opposite the platform to the north of the station building.

The railway was operated from the start by the Bristol and Exeter Railway, which became a part of the Great Western Railway (GWR) in 1876; but the West Somerset Railway remained an independent company until 1922, when it too was absorbed by the GWR. The platform was extended northwards in 1900 and again in 1933; a small signal box was in use here for a few years but was closed on 6 April 1926. The GWR undertook many projects to increase the capacity of the line in the 1930s. Because of the position of the goods shed opposite the platform it was not possible to add a second track and platform at Stogumber, so a passing loop was instead constructed at Leigh Bridge just 0.75 miles (1.21 km) south of the station. It was opened on 16 July 1933 but the signal box was generally only used during the daytime each summer. A GWR camping coach was placed in the goods yard from 1934 to 1939. A camping coach was also positioned here by the Western Region of British Railways from 1952 to 1964; the lack of facilities at this remote location meant that this was accompanied by a water tanker and stores van.

Nationalisation in 1948 saw the line become a part of British Railways. The goods facilities were withdrawn on 17 August 1963, and the goods shed was demolished before the end of the year. Leigh Bridge loop was taken out of use from 5 May 1964 as it was due for renewal. The station, along with the whole line, was closed on 4 January 1971, but on 7 May 1978 trains returned. The new West Somerset Railway operated trains from Minehead to Stogumber, and these were extended to Bishops Lydeard from 9 June 1979.

== Description ==
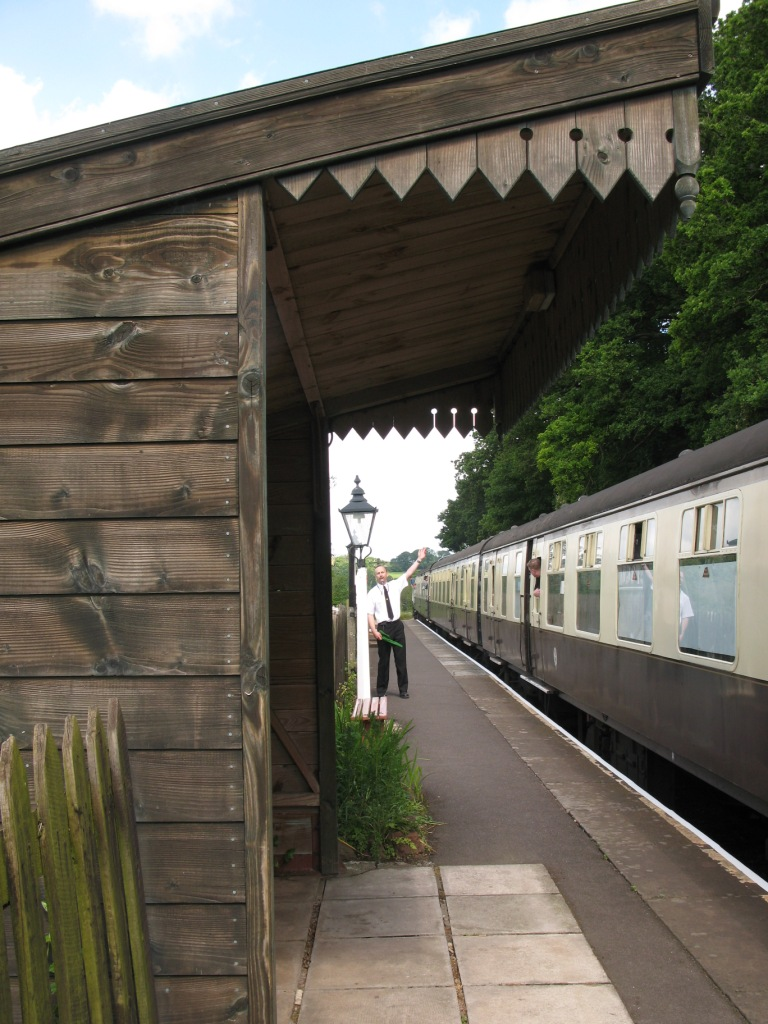
A train to Minehead restarts after its call at Stogumber

The original stone-built station building is still in use on the east side of the line and is situated in gardens. The platform with its waiting shelters is on the west side of the line.

The approach road is on the east side of the line and drops down to the road that passes beneath the line at the south end of the platform. A footpath from the south end of the platform leads down to join this road which leads to Stogumber itself, but a side road to the north by the old railway hotel passes through the smaller settlement of Kingswood, which is nestled below the railway line.

== Services ==
Trains run between Minehead and Bishops Lydeard at weekends and on some other days from March to October, daily during the late spring and summer, and on certain days during the winter.

Preceding station	Heritage railways	Following station
Williton towards Minehead	West Somerset Railway	Crowcombe Heathfield towards Bishops Lydeard
