= All Saints' Church, Bristol =

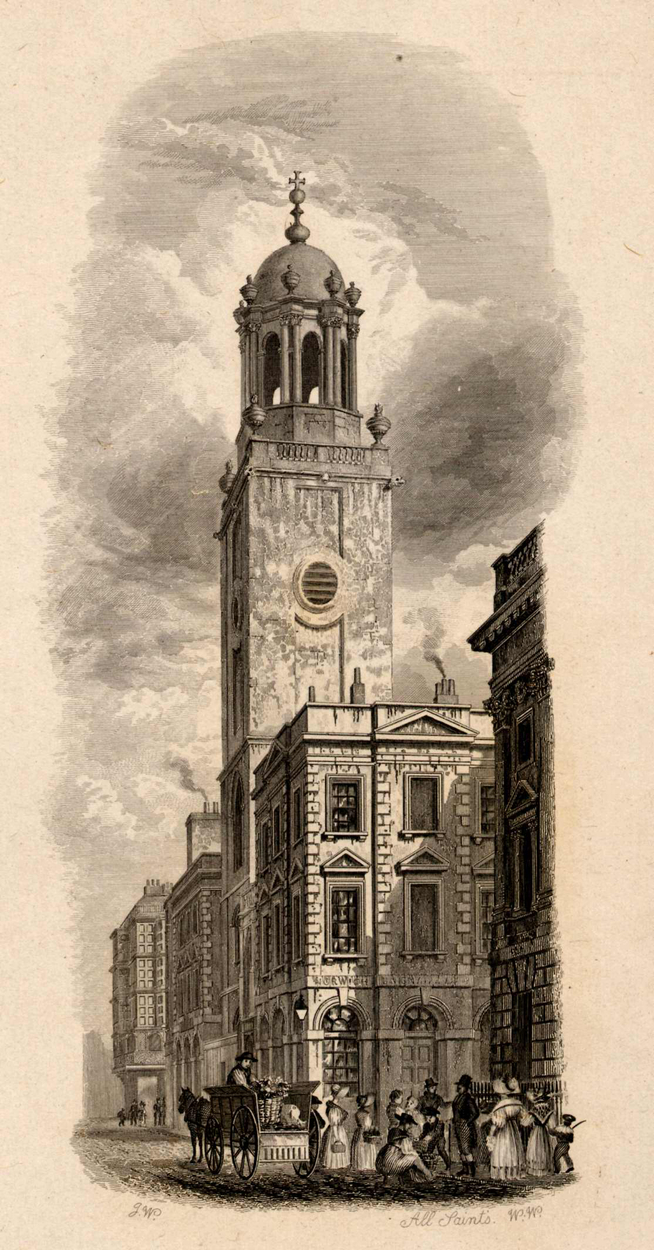
- Printed engraving of All Saints' from around 1838

- shown within Bristol
- 51°27′17″N 2°35′36″W
- Location: Bristol
- Country: England
- Denomination: Church of England

Architecture
- Heritage designation: Grade II* listed building
- Designated: 8 January 1959
- Completed: 12th century
- Closed: 1984

All Saints is a closed Anglican church in Corn Street, Bristol. For many years it was used as a Diocesan Education Centre, but this closed in 2015. The building has been designated as a Grade II* listed building.

== History ==
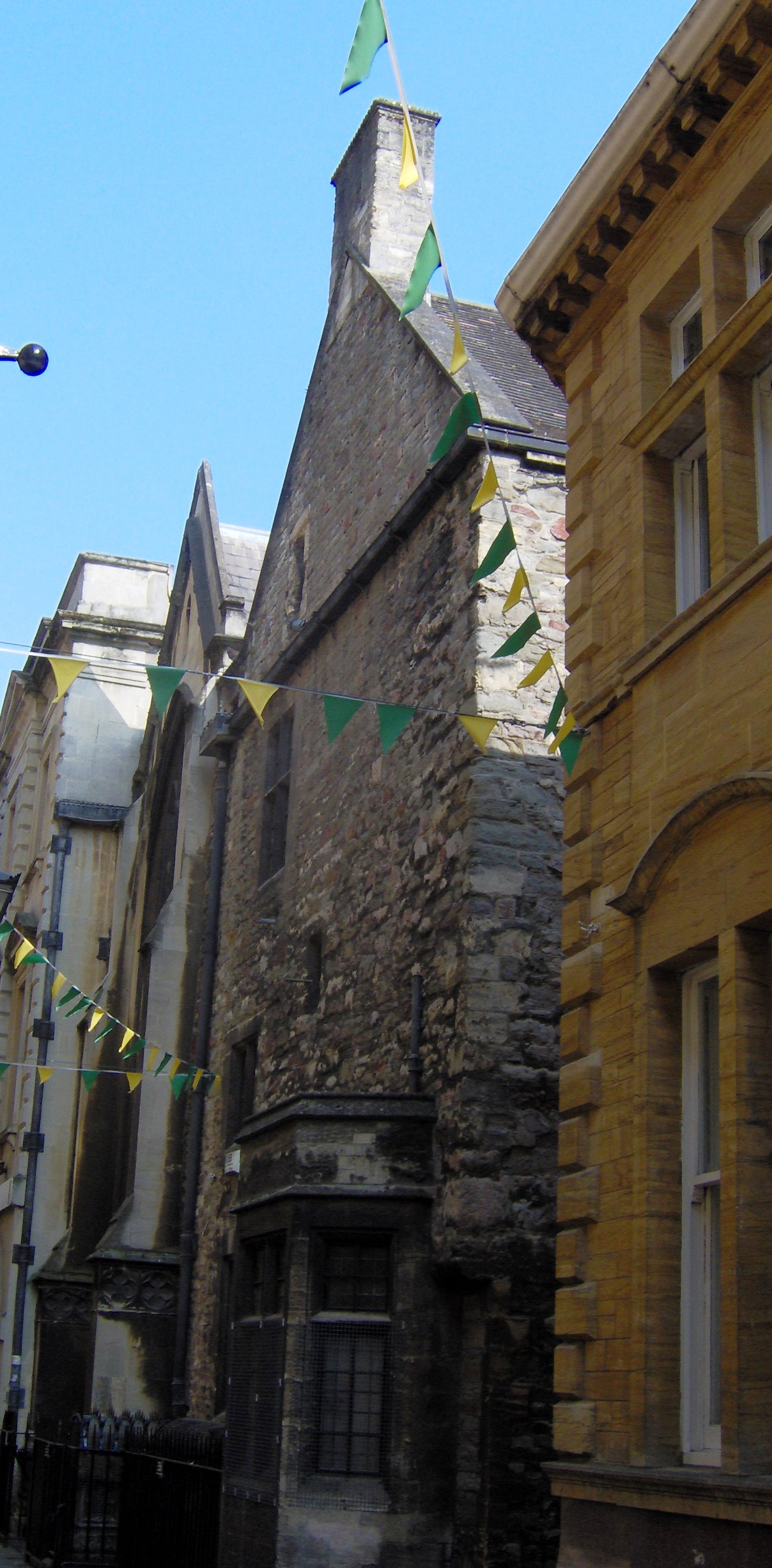
All Saints' Bristol

The west end of the nave survives from the original 12th-century church, and the east nave and aisles were built in the 15th century. Alice Chestre made major donations to the church. The north-east tower was added in 1716 by William Paul, and completed by George Townesend. The lantern was rebuilt by Luke Henwood in 1807, and the chancel rebuilt in the mid-19th century.

The Kalendars, a brotherhood of clergy and laity attached to All Saints, built a library over the north aisle of the church in the fifteenth century; by a deed of 1464 they gave free access to all who wished to study. This was the first 'public' library in the kingdom. In 1466 fire destroyed many of the manuscript books. The composer William Brygeman was a parish clerk at the church in the 16th century.

The church is surrounded on three sides by pedestrian passageways and built into surrounding buildings. Over the south nave is a priests' room and over the north a Georgian coffee room. The most notable monument marks the grave of Edward Colston, the slave trader and philanthropist. It was designed by James Gibbs and carved by John Michael Rysbrack.

The church was closed to the public in 1984. The Diocese of Bristol has tried to sell the church without success. Bristol City Council rejected the suggestion of converting it into a museum. Demolishing the church would be too costly as the church shares walls with neighbouring buildings. In 2026, when the roof became a potential danger to the public, the diocese agreed to repair the roof at about £500,000 cost.

== Archives ==
Parish records for All Saints' Church, Bristol are held at Bristol Archives (Ref. P.AS) (online catalogue), including baptism, marriage and burial registers. The archive also includes records of the incumbent, overseer of the poor, churchwardens, charities, chantries and vestry, plus deeds, maps, plans and surveys.

== See also ==
- Grade II* listed buildings in Bristol
- Churches in Bristol
