= St George's Church, Bicknoller =

Church in Somerset, England

Church of St George
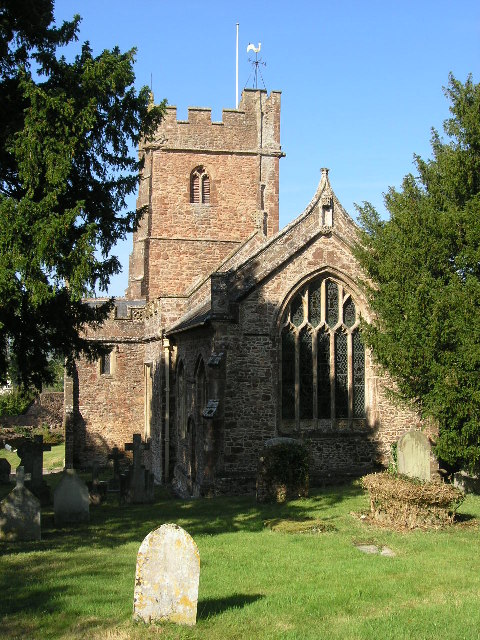

- Location within Somerset

General information
- Location: Bicknoller, England
- Coordinates: 51.1471°N 3.2727°W
- Completed: 12th century

The Church of St George in Bicknoller, Somerset, England dates from the 12th century and has been designated as a Grade I listed building.

The church is dominated by a 1000-year-old yew tree in its grounds.

The church, which is decorated with a collection of carved angels and nightmarish animal heads, was largely rebuilt in the 15th and 16th centuries.

The interior includes a 12th-century pillar piscina. There is a memorial to William Temple, Archbishop of Canterbury, who spent his holidays in the village from 1933 to 1944.

The organ dates from 1922 and has a carved oak case. It was built by the Positive Organ Company. The bells in the tower include one which was previously at St Saviour's in Larkhall, Bath. In 2012 plans were underway to install and sixth bell.

The parish is part of the Quantock Towers benefice within the Taunton archdeaconry.

In May 2026, the church doors were dedicated to the memory of local cricketer Harold Gimblett (1914–1978); the newly-installed doors feature handles in the shape of cricket bats.

== See also ==
- Grade I listed buildings in West Somerset
- List of Somerset towers
- List of ecclesiastical parishes in the Diocese of Bath and Wells
