= Church of St Bartholomew, Rodhuish =

Church in Somerset, England

Church of St Bartholomew
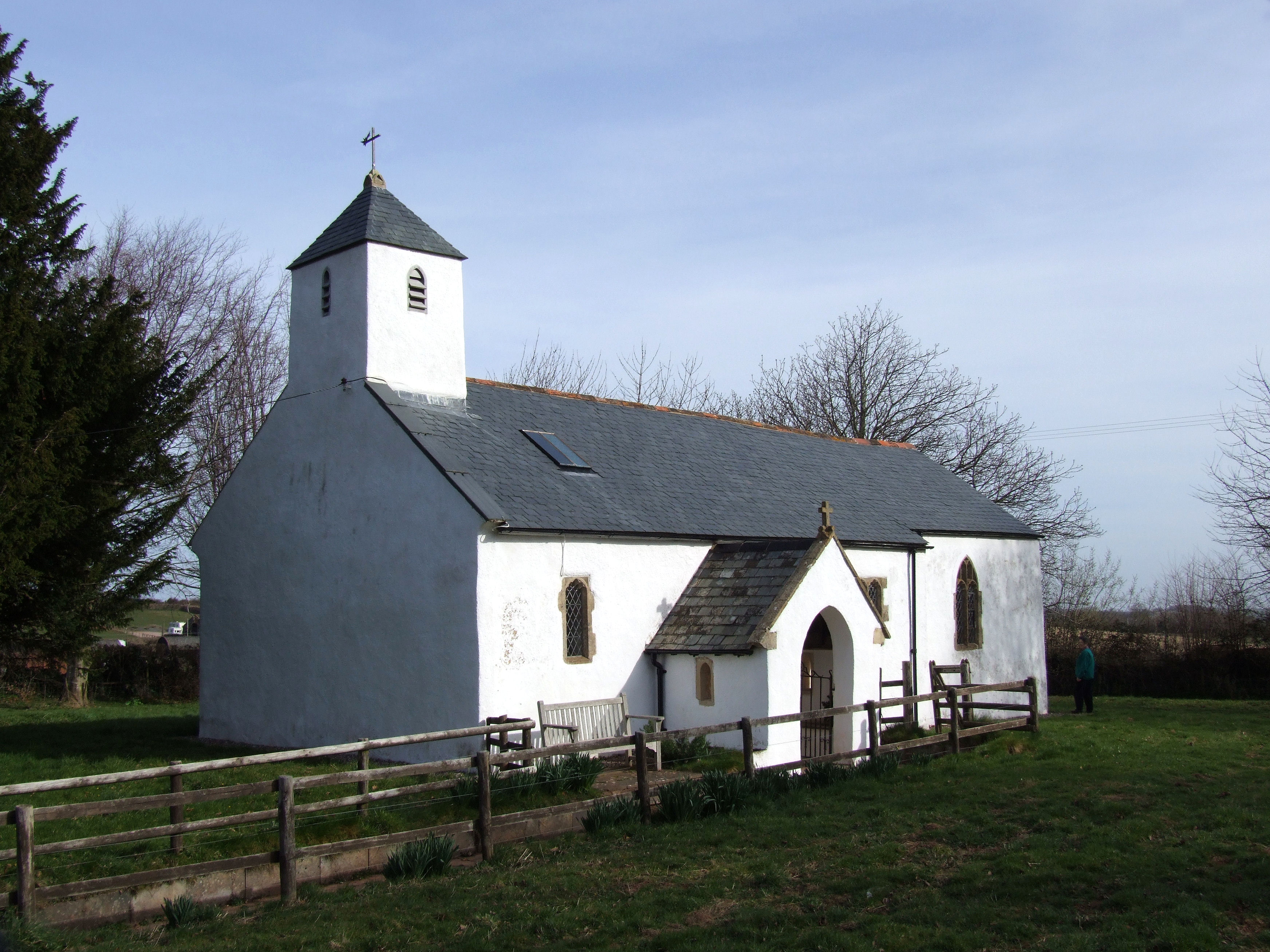

- Location within Somerset
- 51.1471°N 3.4136°W
- Location: Rodhuish, Somerset, England

History
- Built: 15th century

Listed Building – Grade II*
- Official name: Church of St Bartholomew
- Designated: 22 May 1969
- Reference no.: 1175299

The Anglican Church of St Bartholomew in Rodhuish, Somerset, England was built in the 15th century. It is a Grade II* listed building.

== History ==
The church was built as a chapel of ease in the 15th century. It has been revised and reroofed in the 16th, 18th and 20th centuries.

The parish of Withycombe with Rodhuish is part of the benefice of Dunster, Carhampton, Withycombe with Roduish, Timberscombe and Wootton Courtenay within the Diocese of Bath and Wells.

== Architecture ==
The stone building has a slate roof and consists of a nave, chancel and small single stage west bell tower.

The interior has carved chairs depicting biblical scenes which were made in the late 16th or early 17th century and a wooden ambry. The circular font is Norman.
