= Crowcombe =

Village in Somerset, England

Coordinates: 51.1240°N 3.2273°W

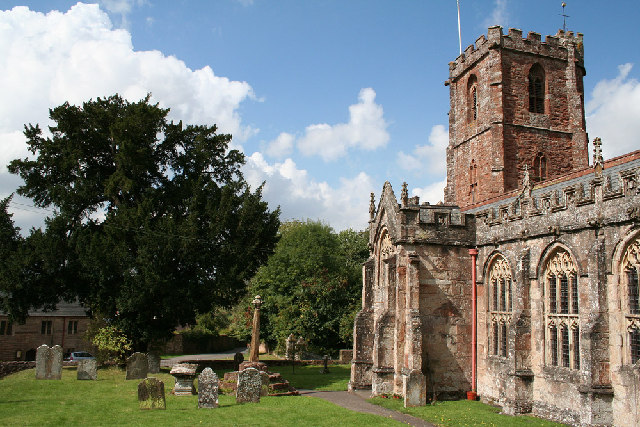
- Crowcombe Church

- Location within Somerset
- Population: 489 (2011)
- OS grid reference: ST142368
- Unitary authority: Somerset
- Ceremonial county: Somerset
- Region: South West
- Country: England
- Sovereign state: United Kingdom
- Post town: Taunton
- Postcode district: TA4
- Police: Avon and Somerset
- Fire: Devon and Somerset
- Ambulance: South Western
- UK Parliament: Tiverton and Minehead

Crowcombe is a village and civil parish under the Quantock Hills in Somerset, England, 5.5 miles (9 km) southeast of Watchet, and 8 miles (13 km) from Taunton. The village has a population of 489.

The parish covers the hamlets of Crowcombe Heathfield, Flaxpool, Halsway, Lawford and Triscombe.

The village is on the route of the Samaritans Way South West.

== History ==
The name Triscombe is believed to derive from the Old English words treows and cumb.

The first documentary evidence of the village is by Æthelwulf of Wessex in 854, where it was spelt 'Cerawicombe'. At that time the manor belonged to Glastonbury Abbey. Later Gytha Thorkelsdóttir, wife of Earl Godwin, gave it to the monks of Winchester to make amends for her husband's "treacherous abuses of divers monastic institutions".

The Domesday Book of 1086 lists the village as 'Crawcombe', which is believed to come from the Old English words craw and cumb. The parish of Crowcombe was part of the Williton and Freemanners Hundred.

The medieval cross of red sandstone is 170 metres (560 ft) north west of Holy Ghost Church. The octagonal shaft is 3 metres (9.8 ft) high, topped by a Greek cross added in the 19th century, standing on an octagonal base.

Crowcombe Heathfield railway station is two miles from the village on the West Somerset Railway, a heritage railway. A small part of the filming of The Beatles' first feature film, A Hard Day's Night, took place here.

== Governance ==
The parish council has responsibility for local issues, including setting an annual precept (local rate) to cover the council's operating costs and producing annual accounts for public scrutiny. The parish council evaluates local planning applications and works with the local police, district council officers, and neighbourhood watch groups on matters of crime, security, and traffic. The parish council's role also includes initiating projects for the maintenance and repair of parish facilities, as well as consulting with the district council on the maintenance, repair, and improvement of highways, drainage, footpaths, public transport, and street cleaning. Conservation matters (including trees and listed buildings) and environmental issues are also the responsibility of the council.

For local government purposes, since 1 April 2023, the parish comes under the unitary authority of Somerset Council. Prior to this, it was part of the non-metropolitan district of Somerset West and Taunton (formed on 1 April 2019) and, before this, the district of West Somerset (established under the Local Government Act 1972). It was part of Williton Rural District before 1974.

There is an electoral ward termed 'Crowcombe and Stogumber'. This extends westerly from Crowcombe via Stogumber to Willett. The total population at the 2011 Census was 1,191.

It is also part of the Tiverton and Minehead county constituency represented in the House of Commons of the Parliament of the United Kingdom. It elects one Member of Parliament (MP) by the first past the post system of election.

== Geography ==
It is the central point on the Quantock Greenway a footpath exploring the Quantock Hills.

Roebuck Meadows is a biological Site of Special Scientific Interest for their very varied and herb-rich vegetation composed of mire and grassland communities together comprising an important example of lowland mire, which is a nationally scarce habitat. The meadows contain Cornish moneywort (Sibthorpia europaea), a nationally scarce plant restricted to south-west Britain.

== Landmarks ==
=== Crowcombe Court ===
Crowcombe Court is a large country house dating from 1724 to 1739, by Thomas Parker and finished by Nathaniel Ireson of Wincanton. Minor alterations were carried out by Edward Middleton Barry around 1870. It is Grade I listed. It has previously been used as a nursing home and today the Court is hired out for weddings and other functions.

=== Halsway Manor ===
Halsway Manor is England's National Centre for Traditional Music, Dance and Song. It is the only residential folk centre in the UK. The eastern end of the building dates from the 15th century with the western end as an addition in the 19th century.

=== Village cross ===
The village cross is 30 metres (98 ft) east of The Carew Arms and 170 metres (560 ft) north west of the Church of the Holy Ghost dates from the 14th century. It is made of red sandstone. The octagonal shaft is 3 metres (9.8 ft) high, topped by a Greek cross added in the 19th century, standing on an octagonal base. It has been scheduled as an ancient monument and designated as a Grade II* listed building.

== Religious sites ==
The Church of the Holy Ghost has a tower dating from the 14th century with the rest of the building being dated at the 15th century. It has been designated by English Heritage as a Grade I listed building.

In 1724 the spire was damaged by a lightning strike. The top section of the spire was removed and is now planted in the churchyard and stone from the spire was used in the flooring of the church. Inside the church carved bench-ends, dating from 1534, depict such pagan subjects as the Green Man and the legend of the men of Crowcombe fighting a two-headed dragon.

=== Church House ===
The Church House and Pound was built around 1515 for parish functions, later being used to house the poor of the village on the lower floor and a school on the upper. Following an appeal for public funds to repair the building in 1907, the ground floor is now being used as a village hall and the upper to house exhibitions. It is a Grade II* listed building. Further grants and public fund raising in 2007 enabled a major refurbishment.

== Notable people ==
- Septimus Ridsdale (1840–1884), cricketer
