= George F. Curtis =

Canadian law professor and dean

1st Dean of University of British Columbia Faculty of Law
- In office 1945–1971
- Succeeded by: Albert McClean

Personal details
- Born: George Fredrick Curtis; 1906 Stogumber, England
- Died: October 23, 2005 (aged 99)
- Spouse: Doris Curtis
- Education: University of Saskatchewan; Oxford University
- Occupation: Law Professor; Dean
- Website: History of UBC Law

George Fredrick Curtis OC OBC QC (1906 – October 23, 2005), was the founding dean of the University of British Columbia Faculty of Law.

== Early life and career ==
Born 1906 in Stogumber, England, Curtis came to Canada in 1913. He attended Moose Jaw Collegiate and then earned his law degree at the University of Saskatchewan in 1927, being awarded the Governor-General's Gold Medal on graduation. He then went on to study at Oxford University as a Rhodes Scholar, where he earned his Bachelor of Arts in Jurisprudence in 1930 and his BCL in 1931, both with first class honours.

Curtis was in private legal practice in Halifax, Nova Scotia, and taught at Dalhousie University until he was appointed the founding Dean of the University of British Columbia Faculty of Law in 1945. He arrived at a time when there was very little money, no facility to house classes, and no library. Undaunted by these challenges, Curtis took the initiative and recruited judges and practitioners as voluntary lecturers to supplement himself and one other professor. He served in this capacity until 1971. He was later named Dean Emeritus by the university.

UBC’s Faculty of Law began its first classes in September 1945, operating from old army huts transplanted to UBC at the end of World War II. Founding Dean Curtis fought hard for proper facilities for B.C.’s first law school, and on September 4, 1952, the University officially opened the first purpose-built law school building in Canada. By the 1970s, the Faculty had outgrown its first building and embarked on a major renovation including the addition of a new multi-story concrete structure built in the Brutalist style fashionable at the time. The new Law building re-opened on September 17, 1976, as the "George F. Curtis Building." Curtis kept an office in the building until 2005, when he died at the age of 99. In August 2011, UBC Law will move into a brand new building on the same site named Allard Hall. A significant space in the building will be named "The George F. Curtis Dean's and Student Government Suite" which will house deans and administrative offices as well as offices and meeting space for the Law Student Society.

== Important dates ==
- 1957 - Named Queen's Counsel
- 1960s - Helped draft the BC University Act
- 1964 - Named a member of the Order of the Coif in 1964
- 1986 - First recipient of the Law Society Award
- 1995 - Named a member of the Order of British Columbia
- 1995 - Received the Canadian Bar Association’s Ramon John Hnatyshyn Award for Law
- 2003 - Received the Queen's Jubilee Gold Medal
- 2003 - Appointed an officer of The Order of Canada

== Bibliography ==
- UBC Archives
