= St Peter's Church, Huish Champflower =

Church in Somerset, England

Church of St Peter
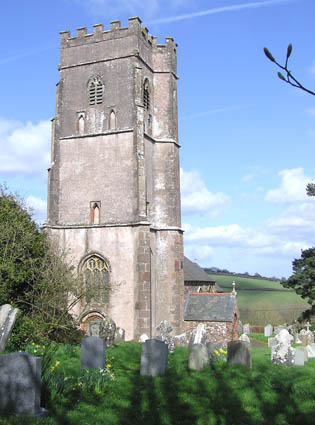

- Location within Somerset

General information
- Location: Huish Champflower, England
- Coordinates: 51.0543°N 3.3580°W
- Completed: 15th century

The Church of St Peter in Huish Champflower, Somerset, England dates from the 15th century, with the north aisle being built in 1534. It has been designated by English Heritage as a Grade I listed building.

It was built on the site of an earlier Norman church although nothing of the previous structure remains.

The tower arch dates from 1703, and the building was restored in 1875–80 when the chancel arch was rebuilt. It includes a tower with five bells, one of which was made in 1790 by Thomas Bilbie of the Bilbie family in Cullompton.

The church includes stained glass claimed to be from the remains of a Jesse window from Barlynch Priory near Dulverton, and a 15th-century lectern.

The parish is part of the Wiveliscombe and the Hills mbenefice within the Tone deanery. A service is held at the church once a month.

== See also ==
- Grade I listed buildings in West Somerset
- List of Somerset towers
- List of ecclesiastical parishes in the Diocese of Bath and Wells
