= St Mary's Church, Stogumber =

Church in Somerset, England

Church of St Mary
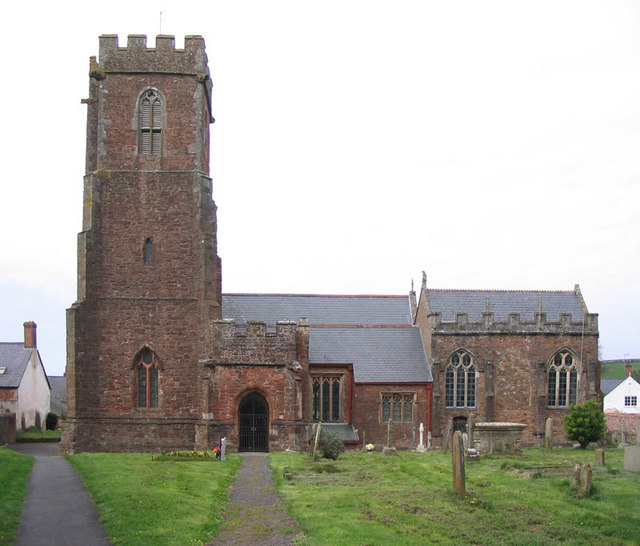

- Location within Somerset

General information
- Location: Stogumber, England
- Coordinates: 51.1278°N 3.2903°W
- Completed: late 13th century

The Church of St Mary in Stogumber, Somerset, England dates from the late 13th century. It has been designated as a Grade I listed building.

The church was founded as a Saxon minster with a chapelry at Bicknoller and other dues payable from property in Monksilver, Clatworthy and Elworthy.

The oldest portions of the church are the tower and south porch. The tower can be dated from a will bequeathing money for its construction in 1401. The north aisle is traditionally held to have been built by Cardinal Beaufort as a penance for his behaviour at his hunting lodge Halsway Manor. The red sandstone church was restored in the 1870s to designs by John Dando Sedding. The interior includes a chandelier built around 1770. The font is from the 15th century. The church has a stone pulpit.

The churchyard contains the war graves of two Gunners of World War I.

The Old Vicarage, which is now a private dwelling, was built in the 15th century. The old brewhouse behind the vicarage is medieval in origin.

The parish is part of the Quantock Towers benefice within the Quantock deanery.

== See also ==
- Grade I listed buildings in West Somerset
- List of Somerset towers
- List of ecclesiastical parishes in the Diocese of Bath and Wells
