= Crowcombe Heathfield railway station =

Heritage railway station in Somerset, England

Crowcombe Heathfield
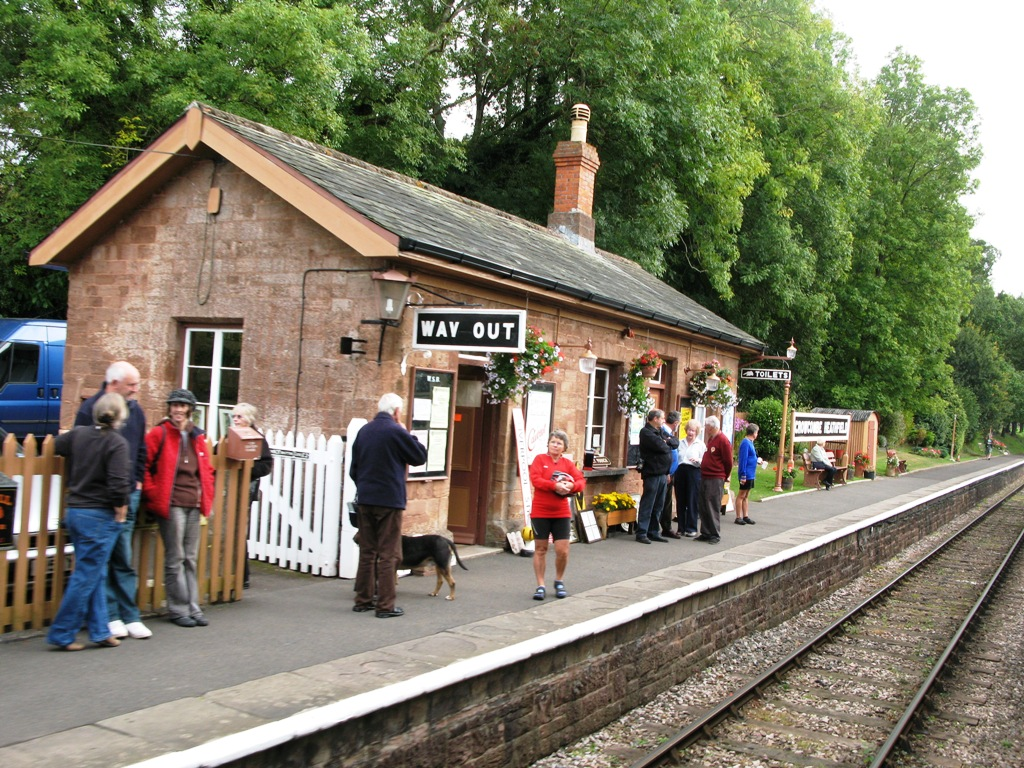

General information
- Location: Crowcombe, Somerset; England
- Coordinates: 51.101°N 3.2333°W
- Grid reference: ST136343
- System: Station on heritage railway
- Operator: West Somerset Railway
- Platforms: 2

History
- Original company: West Somerset Railway
- Post-grouping: Great Western Railway

Key dates
- 1862: Opened
- 1971: Closed
- 1979: Reopened
Location

Crowcombe Heathfield railway station is a station on the West Somerset Railway, a heritage railway in Somerset, England. It is situated 2 miles (3.2 km) from the village of Crowcombe.

== History ==
Crowcombe Heathfield station was first opened on 31 March 1862 when the West Somerset Railway was opened from Norton Junction to Watchet. The railway was operated by the Bristol and Exeter Railway which became a part of the Great Western Railway in 1876, but the West Somerset Railway remained an independent company until 1922 when it too was absorbed by the Great Western.

When the station first opened there was just one platform, on the east side of the line, on what is now the "up" side towards Taunton. A "down" loop line and second platform were opened in 1879, together with an accompanying signal box at its north eastern end. The developments also included an extension of the existing goods siding west of the station, accessed via the western throat, which was extended to the road overbridge. W.G.King's had a quarry at Triscombe, and had built their own 2 ft (610 mm) tramway transporting stone from the quarry to a stone-crusher, and then onwards to either: a tarmac/concrete plant located adjacent to the Station Master's House; or a tipper parallel to the goods siding, and hence loaded on to its own set of 5 plank 10 long tons (10,000 kg) private owner wagons.

On 1 December 1889 the station was renamed as plain "Crowcombe" to avoid confusion with Heathfield (Devon) on the Moretonhampstead branch in Devon. The loop was extended in 1934 to cope with long holiday trains running to Minehead, leaving the signal box now sited midway down the western platform; the eastern ends of the platforms to this day are made up of different materials.

Nationalisation in 1948 saw it become a part of the Western Region of British Railways. British Rail closed the railway on 4 January 1971, during which they demolished a number of buildings on the stations platforms, and burnt down the original "squat" B&ER signal box.

=== WSR ===
The station reopened on 9 June 1979; the West Somerset Railway was now a heritage railway operating steam and diesel trains from Minehead to and Bishops Lydeard. The WSR removed the goods siding, and left the down side loop out of action. The station was still known as Crowcombe for a while, but the name was returned to Crowcombe Heathfield in 1991.

== Description ==
Located in a small local valley, the station stands at the highest point on the line, just under 400 feet (120 m) above sea level. The station has been designated by English Heritage as a grade II listed building. The railway workers' cottages and station master's house, together with the main station building, are the only original structures left. A display of permanent way can be found on the western platform and includes a portion of 7 ft (2,134 mm) broad gauge "baulk road" as was originally used on the line.

== Loop and signal box ==
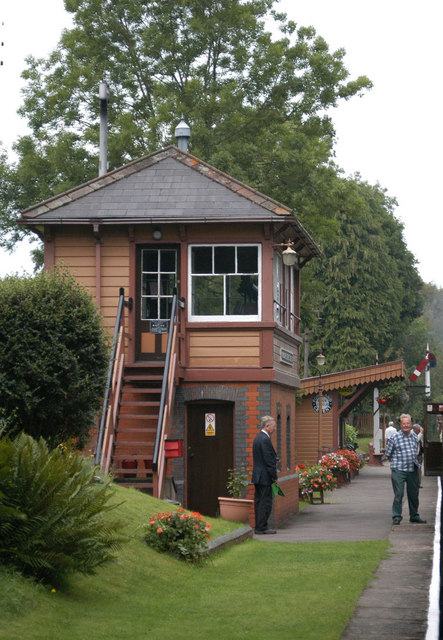
The signal box, looking towards Minehead. The grassed sections of the platform are located on the 1934 extension

The station stands at the highest point on the line, just under 400 feet (120 m) above sea level, approached by a 1:86 gradient either side. This has always slowed the operating time on the long section between Bishops Lydeard and Williton, resulting in total capacity restrictions on the whole line to Minehead. Increasing seasonal passenger traffic to Minehead, was the driver behind the B&ER installing a loop at the station in 1879, doubling maximum traffic to a total of four trains per hour.

When the WSR reopened the line only the eastern "up" platform line was certified for operation. The resultant long-section between Bishops Lydeard and Williton meant that the line could only operate a maximum of two trains which were timed to pass at Williton which is about halfway along the 20 miles (32 km) line. The station's loop was reinstated in May 1994 so a new signal box was required. A small standard-pattern GWR signal box was made using an upper wooden section reclaimed from the closed Ebbw Vale Sidings South in South Wales which was mounted on a newly constructed standard-height brick locking room. This has access steps on the southern side rather than the northern side as before. The 34 lever tappet-locking frame was first installed at Marsh Junction, Bristol, and then moved to Frome North in 1970. It was bought directly by the WSR after that signal box closed in 1984, and reinstalled in its current location, with 29 operating levers. The two loops were purposefully installed with linked-operated catch-points, which allows full two-train operations.

The signalling design allows the signal box to be switched-out of operation at quiet times when trains do not need to pass here. Three token boxes are hence provided at the signal boxes at Bishops Lydeard and Williton, and the signal box has two extra levers to allow the signalman to passover section control.

== Films made at Crowcombe ==
Several films and television programmes have been shot at Crowcombe:

- A Hard Day's Night (1964) featured The Beatles and was filmed in 1964 at London Marylebone station and on the Taunton to Minehead branch line. A scene in which the band ran alongside a train was filmed near Crowcombe.
- The Flockton Flyer (1976-7) was a children's television drama series about a preserved railway that was filmed on the West Somerset Railway and included scenes filmed at many stations, including Crowcombe Heathfield.
- The Land Girls (1997) was filmed on the West Somerset Railway; Crowcombe Heathfield featured as Bamford station.
- The Lion, the Witch and the Wardrobe (1988), a BBC television mini-series, where the four Pevensie children arrived at the start of the film after being evacuated by train from London.

== Services ==
Trains run between Minehead and Bishops Lydeard at weekends and on some other days from March to October, daily during the late spring and summer, and on certain days during the winter.

| Preceding station | Heritage railways | Following station |
|---|---|---|
| Stogumber towards Minehead | West Somerset Railway | Bishops Lydeard Terminus |
| Stogumber towards Minehead | West Somerset Railway Special events only | Bishops Lydeard towards Taunton |
