= All Saints Church, Dodington =

Church in Somerset, England

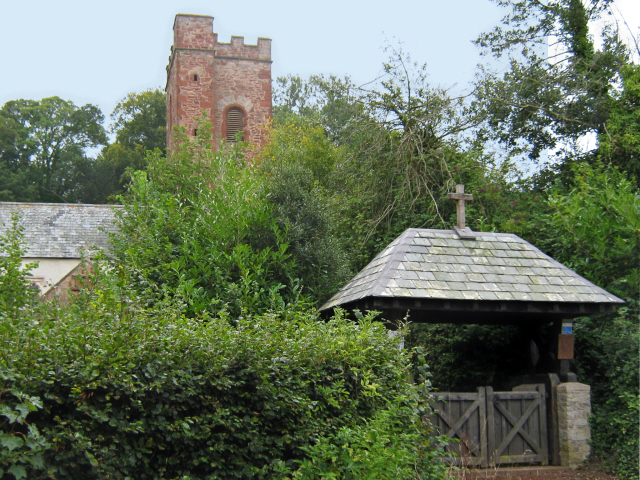

- Location within Somerset

General information
- Location: Dodington, Holford, England
- Coordinates: 51.1585°N 3.1850°W
- Completed: 15th century

All Saints Church at Dodington in the parish of Holford, Somerset, England was rebuilt and enlarged in the 15th century. It has been designated by English Heritage as a Grade I listed building.

The nave was refenestrated and re-roofed in the 16th century, and the chancel refenestrated early in the 17th century, having been previously rebuilt in the 15th century. A chapel was added in 1610, and the upper stage of the tower added in 1772. New pews were added in 1874 and further restoration, including the building of the lych gate took place after World War I. The tower had four bells in 1933 but they are no longer rung.

In the church is a memorial to Admiral Sir Edward Codrington.

== See also ==
- Grade I listed buildings in West Somerset
- List of Somerset towers
