= Church of St John the Baptist, Carhampton =

Church in Somerset, England

Church of St John the Baptist
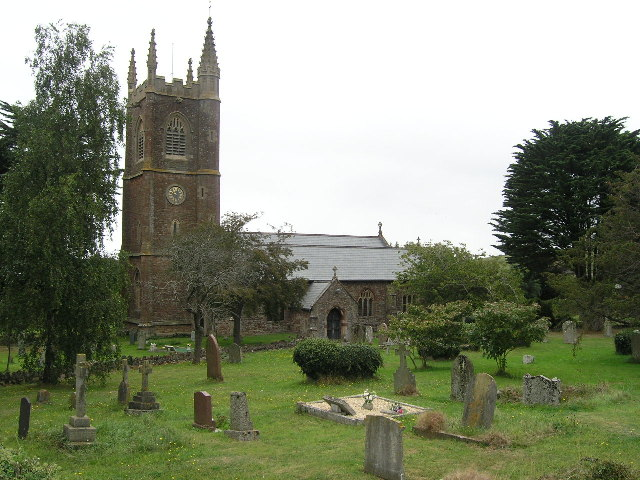

- Location within Somerset

General information
- Location: Carhampton, England
- Coordinates: 51.1746°N 3.4186°W
- Completed: 1863

The Church of St John the Baptist in Carhampton, Somerset, England is a Grade I listed Anglican church.

The first church in the village stood to the east of the present church and was dedicated to St Carannog, a Welsh monk of the 6th century.

The present church was mainly built in the Perpendicular period of the fifteenth century. It was largely rebuilt in 1862–1863, and further work in 1868–1870 rebuilt the tower and added a vestry. It previously had a low tower with a tiled top.

The wooden pulpit and a painted wooden screen are from the previous building and date from around 1500, along with some of the monuments and bells from the earlier church.

The church is within the benefice of Dunster, Carhampton, Withycombe w Roduish, Timberscombe and Wootton Courtenay, which is part of the Exmoor deanery and the Taunton archdeanery.

== See also ==
- Grade I listed buildings in West Somerset
- List of Somerset towers
- List of ecclesiastical parishes in the Diocese of Bath and Wells
