= Bratton Court =

Building in Somerset, England

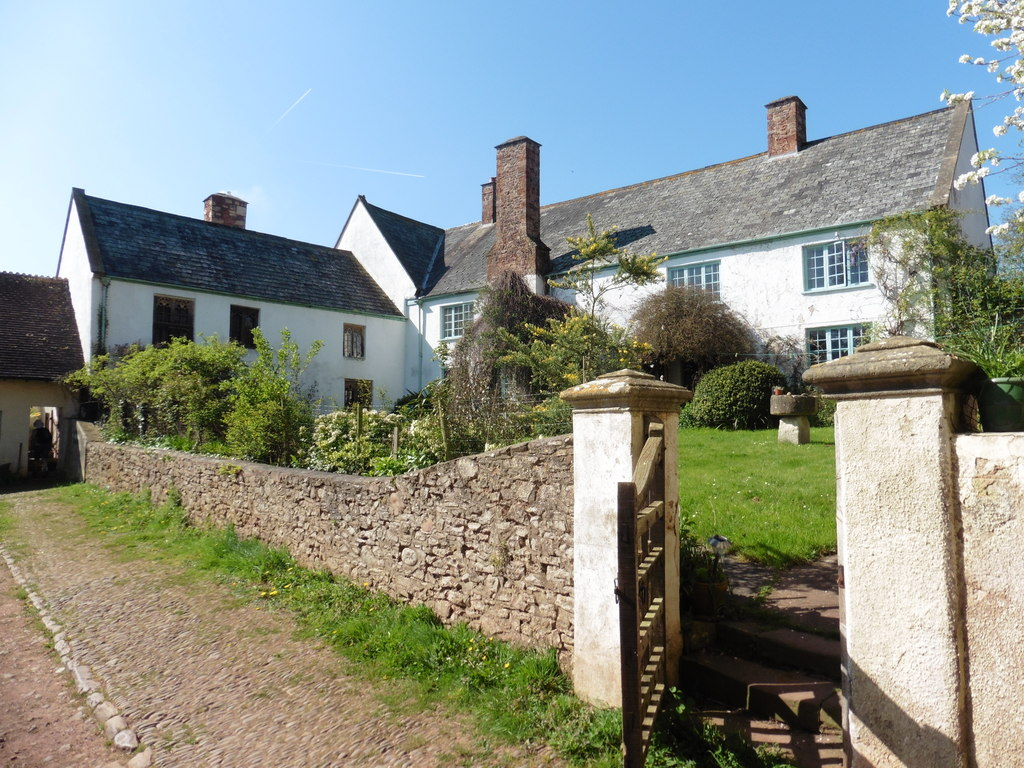

- Location within Somerset

General information
- Location: England
- Coordinates: 51.2060°N 3.5096°W
- Completed: 14th century

Bratton Court in the hamlet of Bratton within the parish of Minehead Without, Somerset, England was built as a manor house, with a 14th-century open hall and 15th-century solar hall. It is within the Exmoor National Park and has been designated as a Grade I listed building. It was enlarged in the 17th century and extensively altered in the late 19th and early 20th centuries. It is now a farmhouse divided into 2 dwellings. The gatehouse and the barn at the west end of the courtyard date from the fifteenth century and are also listed as Grade I buildings.

== Architecture ==
Bratton Court was built as a manor house in the fourteenth century, when the open hall was constructed, and fifteenth century when the solar hall was added. Further additions were made in the seventeenth century and considerable alterations were made in the late nineteenth and early twentieth centuries. It has a T-shaped plan and is built of rubble stone, now rendered, with slate roofs, large stone chimney stack to the left of the entrance and a smaller one to the right. The main block is two storeys high with nineteenth century casement windows. It is a three cell unit with an open hall, with one bay to the left of the wooden entrance porch and two bays to the right. A cross passage is orientated north and south, and there is a solar wing to the east; this wing was at one time thought to have been the chapel but is now recognised as the solar. It has a featureless ground floor while the first floor has three pairs of jointed cruck trusses, one of which is fully arch braced. There is a chamfered pointed arched opening in the east gable wall, another opening to the left, and a chamfered lintel over the fireplace.

The stone mullion windows are irregularly arranged; some have trefoil heads with pierced spandrels showing a foliage design while others have cusped heads. On the rear of the building beside the archway is a single storey, slated roof extension with a chimney stack which houses a bread oven. The interior of the house has been much altered, but there is the remains of an aisle post near the entrance, forming the jam of a door-frame that once separated the servants quarters, and another, octagonal aisle post with splayed plinth and four curved braces at the south end of the house. The upper storey has seven pairs of arch braced collar beam trusses which are smoke-blackened in the roof space.

Bratton Court was designated as a Grade I listed building on 22 May 1969. At the time of listing, the building was in use as a farmhouse and had been divided into two dwellings. The associated gatehouse and barn which abut the west end of the court date from the fifteenth century and are also designated as Grade I buildings.

In 2002 a planning application was submitted to convert the stables into a cafe, craft centre, smokery and offices.

== See also ==
- Grade I listed buildings in West Somerset
