= St Petroc's Church, Egloshayle =

Coordinates: 50°30′46″N 4°49′16″W

- St Petroc's Church
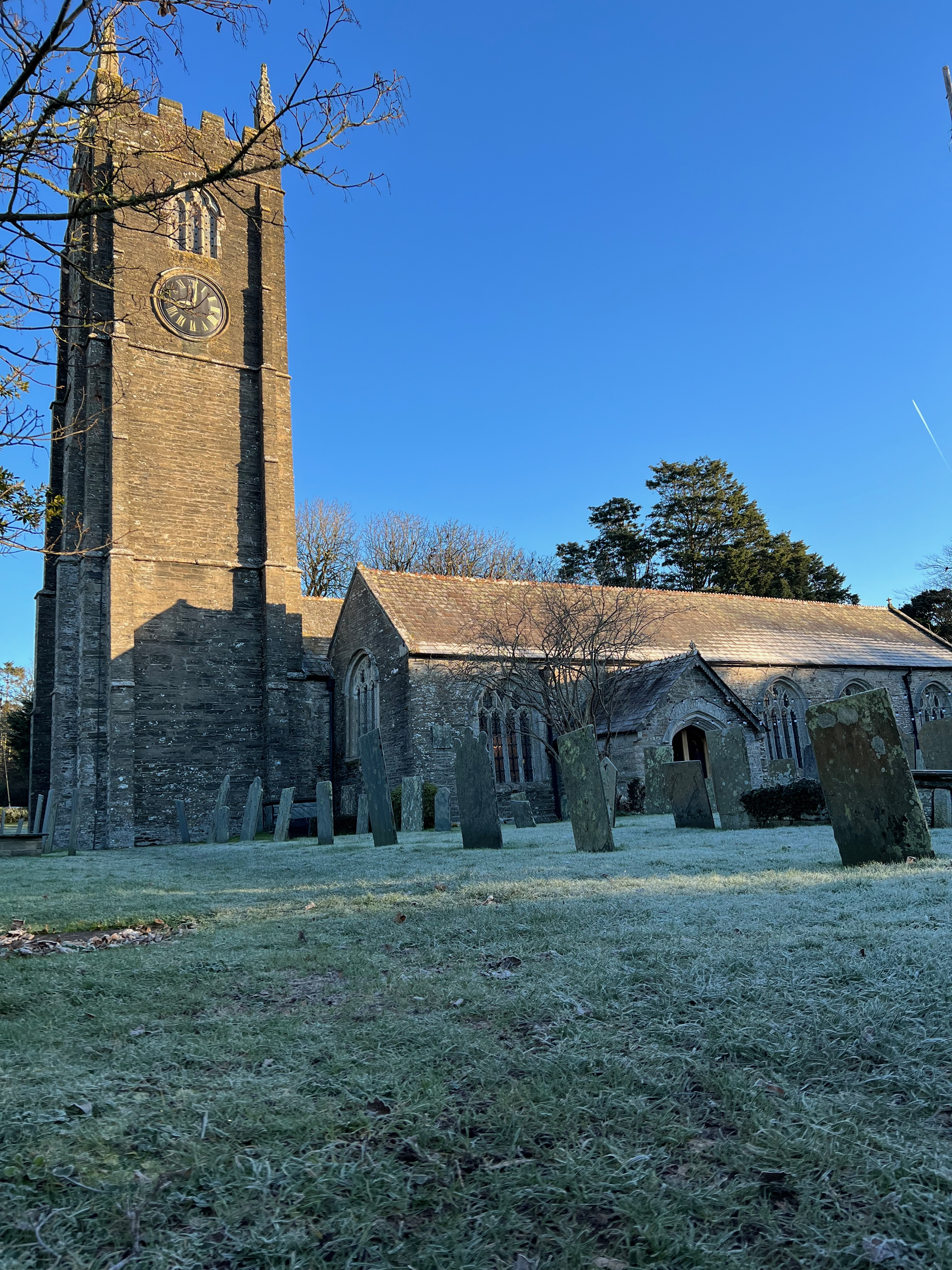
- St Petroc's Church, Egloshayle
- St Petroc's Church, Egloshayle
- Location: Egloshayle, Wadebridge, Cornwall
- Country: England
- Denomination: Church of England

History
- Dedication: St Petroc

Architecture
- Heritage designation: Grade I listed
- Designated: 26 January 1951
- Architectural type: Parish church
- Style: Norman and Gothic

Administration
- Province: Province of Canterbury
- Diocese: Diocese of Truro
- Archdeaconry: Bodmin
- Deanery: Trigg Minor and Bodmin
- Parish: St Breoke and Egloshalye in Wadebridge

Clergy
- Rector: Rev'd Jules Williams

St Petroc's Church, Egloshayle, commonly known as Egloshayle Church, is an Anglican parish church in the village of Egloshayle, near Wadebridge in Cornwall, England. It is a Grade I listed building and is recognised for its medieval architecture and historical significance.

== History ==
A church at Egloshayle has been recorded since at least the 12th century. The patronage of the church was historically held by the Earl of Gloucester, later passing to the Benedictine order and subsequently to the See of Exeter. Following the establishment of the Diocese of Truro in 1876, the church became part of that diocese.

The church is dedicated to St Petroc, a prominent Cornish saint associated with early Celtic Christianity in the region.

== Architecture ==
The north and west walls of the nave date from the 12th century. Major rebuilding took place during the late 15th century, including the construction of the west tower. A south aisle and porch were added in later medieval periods.

In 1867 the church underwent a Victorian restoration overseen by architect Piers St Aubyn, during which structural repairs and alterations were carried out.

== Interior ==
Notable interior features include a Norman stone font with blind arcading and a 15th-century pulpit carved from Caen stone. The church also contains a number of historic monuments and memorials, including those associated with local families.

== Bells ==
The tower of St Petroc’s Church, Egloshayle contains a ring of eight bells hung for full-circle change ringing. The bells were cast over a period of more than 150 years, reflecting the gradual development of the ring.

Four bells (the 4th to 7th) date from 1756 and were cast by Abel Rudhall of Gloucester, making them the oldest bells still in use at the church. The third bell was added in 1876 and was cast by Mears & Stainbank of the Whitechapel Bell Foundry. The ring was completed in 1907 when John Taylor & Co supplied the treble, second and tenor bells and installed the present cast-iron bell frame.

The completed ring has a tenor weighing approximately 12 long hundredweight and is tuned in F♯. Bell ringing has long been associated with the church, and Egloshayle is referenced in the early 19th-century folk song The Ringers of Egloshayle, reflecting the historical significance of ringing in the parish.

== Heritage designation ==
St Petroc's Church was designated a Grade I listed building on 26 January 1951, recognising its architectural and historic importance.

== Parish status ==
The church is in a joint parish with:

- St Breoke Church, St Breock, Wadebridge
- St Conans Church, Washaway, Bodmin
- St Marys at the Betjeman Centre, Wadebridge (Closed and demolished)

== Clergy ==
=== Current clergy ===
- The Revd Jules Williams – Rector (2024)

=== Previous clergy ===
- The Revd Stephen Payne – Rector (2020)
- The Revd John Hereward – Rector (2013)
- The Revd Canon William Stuart-White – Priest-in-Charge (2009)

=== Rectors of Egloshayle (historical) ===
All earlier records prior to 1137 are lost. Known incumbents include:

- John de Esse (1274)
- William de Bisunay (1282)
- Sir Thomas de Bisunay (1311)
- Roger de Dupeford (1318)
- John de Boraston (1331)
- Richard de Hodynet (1333)
- Robert de Poghwelle (1337)
- Randolph Borlase (1349)
- John Warre (1363)
- Richard Alden (1376)
- John Dreyn (1386)
- Thomas Erryngne (1387)
- William Cornwayll (1392)
- Richard Coventre (1400)
- John Mychel (1403)
- John Lovybond (1461)
- Thomas Marshall (1475)
- John Ime (1476)
- Thomas Lovybond (14--)
- John Luke (14--)
- Thomas Wodington (14--)
- John Track (1506)
- Friar Thomas Vivian (1509)
- John Lewes (1533)
- Walter Burgoine (1536)
- Thomas Toppney (1551)
- John Hendy (1554)
- Robert Daniels (1560)
- Sir Nicholas Fawkeyor(1563)
- Christopher Bodley (1566)
- Robert Goldsmith (1567)
- Peter Horswill (1576)
- Richard Reynolds (1609)
- Christopher Collyer (1614)
- Robert Peterson (1633)
- Henry Hole (1634)
- William Mathew (1659)
- Nicholas May (1681)
- John Hatheway (1708)
- William Ford (1730)
- James Kendall (1731)
- Cornelius Crawford (1733)
- Robert Dennis (1753)
- Henry Peers (1761)
- Sir Henry Trelawny, Bart. (1793)
- Richard Cory (1804)
- Thomas Stackhouse Carlyon (1833)
- Edward Shuttleworth (1849)
- Edward Starke Shuttleworth (1888)
- Charles Edward Little (1889)
- George Durno (1891)
- Josiah Oake Adams (1904)
- George Peter Charles Sutton (1916)
- Arthur Long Price (1924)
- Charles Thomas Rowland (1929)
- Frank Peace Royle (1947)
- W.Norman Williams (1961)
- Malcolm R. Ellis (1973)
- H.Roger Watson (1983)
- Raymond Hayne (1985)
- Peter Twisleton (1990)
- Brian A. Anderson (1994)
- Timothy Cotton (2002)
- Nigel Thomas (2007)
