= Barlynch Priory =

- Interactive map of Barlynch Priory

Monastery information
- Other name: St Nicholas's Priory
- Order: Augustinian
- Established: Between 1154 and 1189
- Disestablished: 1539

People
- Founder: William de Say

Site
- Location: Brompton Regis, Somerset, England
- Coordinates: 51°03′01″N 3°31′46″W
- Grid reference: grid reference SS928289
- Visible remains: Walling at Barlynch Farm

Barlynch Priory (also known as St Nicholas's Priory and sometimes spelled Barlinch Priory) in Brompton Regis, Somerset, England was an Augustinian priory founded by William de Say between 1154 and 1189 and dissolved in 1537.

In the late 15th century the prior was John Chester, one of the sons of Alice Chestre who made donations to the church. In 1524 the priory was at its largest with nine canons.

The only visible remains are some fragments of walling attached to Barlynch farmhouse, which have been designated as a Scheduled Ancient Monument (Somerset County No 182). It has been added to the Heritage at Risk Register because of the risk of collapse.

Some of the stained glass from a Jesse window at the Priory is now in the St Peter's Church in Huish Champflower.
