= Crowcombe Court =

Country house in Somerset, England

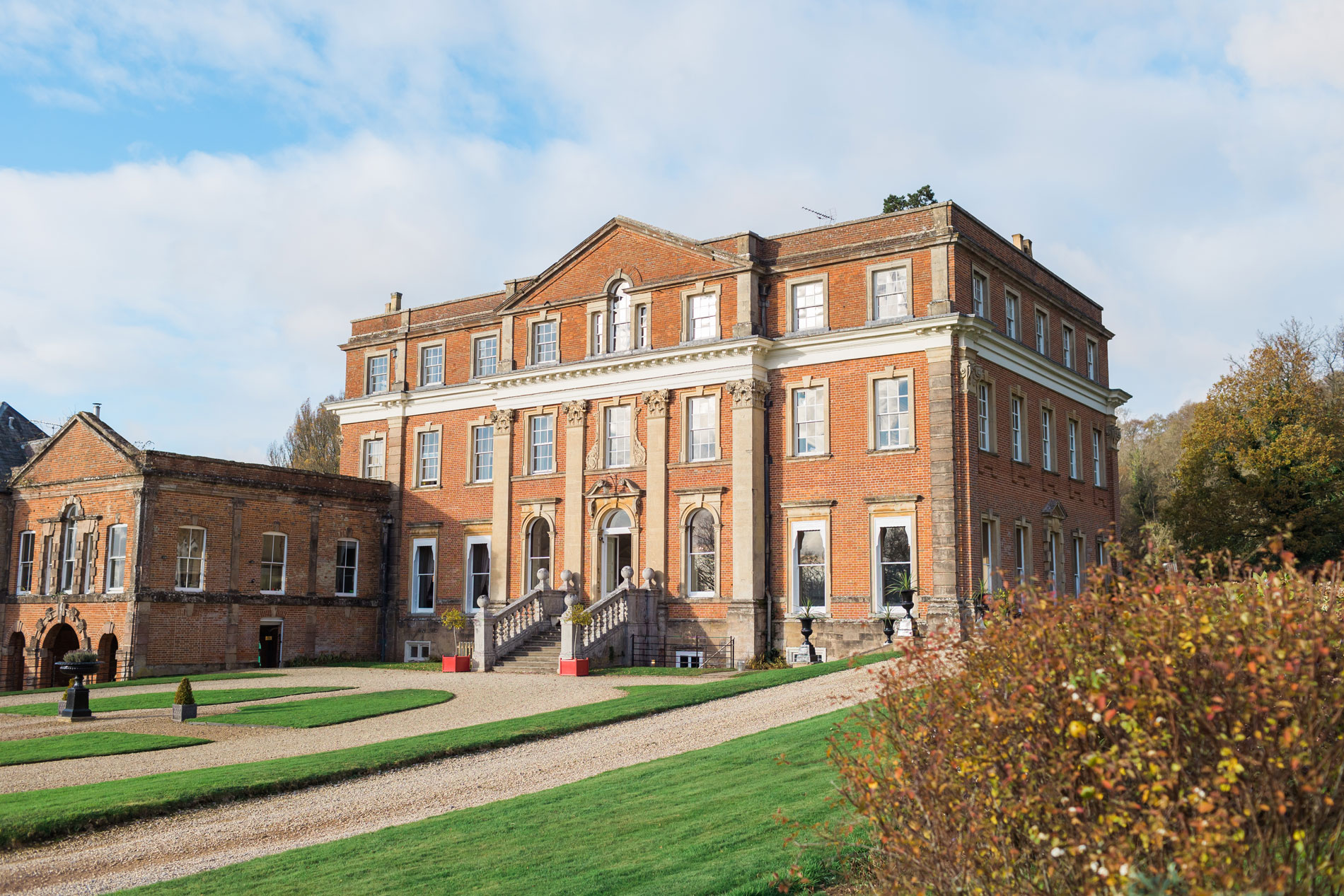
- Crowcombe Court

- Location within Somerset

General information
- Location: Crowcombe, England
- Coordinates: 51.1250°N 3.2305°W
- Completed: 1739

Crowcombe Court in Crowcombe, Somerset, England is a large country house dating from 1724 to 1739. It is Grade I listed.

It was built, in English regional baroque style, by Thomas Parker, for Thomas Carew, and finished by Nathaniel Ireson of Wincanton, after Carew found that Parker had taken old coins, found while demolishing the old house. Minor alterations were carried out by Edward Middleton Barry around 1870.

The house has terracotta coloured bricks complemented by Bath stone pilasters and frontispiece. The interior includes plasterwork by Grinling Gibbons. The house was described by Nikolaus Pevsner as "the finest house of its date in Somerset south of the Bath area".

Brympton School, previously at Brympton d'Evercy, occupied Crowcombe Court between 1974 and 1976. It has also been used as a nursing home.

The previous owners of the house David and Kate Kenyon purchased the property in 2011. Kate is a direct descendant of James Morrison.

The gardens and parkland are listed, Grade II, on the Register of Historic Parks and Gardens of special historic interest in England.

As of 2019, Crowcombe Court is owned by The Gilchrist Collection and is used as a Wedding Venue.

== See also ==
- Grade I listed buildings in West Somerset
