= Huish Champflower =

Village and civil parish in Somerset, England

Coordinates: 51.0568°N 3.3640°W

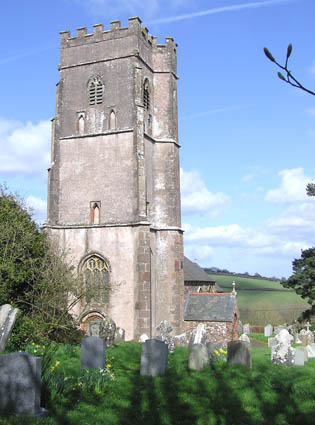
- St Peters Church

- Location within Somerset
- Population: 301 (Census 2011)
- OS grid reference: ST045295
- Unitary authority: Somerset Council
- Ceremonial county: Somerset
- Region: South West
- Country: England
- Sovereign state: United Kingdom
- Post town: TAUNTON
- Postcode district: TA4
- Dialling code: 01984
- Police: Avon and Somerset
- Fire: Devon and Somerset
- Ambulance: South Western
- UK Parliament: Tiverton and Minehead

Huish Champflower is a village and civil parish in Somerset, England, three miles north-west of Wiveliscombe and ten miles north of Wellington. It has a population of 301 (Census 2011).

== History ==
The name comes from the hiwisc, the Saxon for homestead, and it was recorded in the Domesday Book of 1066 as Hiwis, with the suffix marking its ownership by the family of Thomas de Champflower, who was Lord of the manor by 1166.

Just outside the village, on the road to the Brendon Hills and Clatworthy Reservoir, is Huish Champflower round barrow.

The parish of Huish Champflower was part of the Williton and Freemanners Hundred.

A house called Washbottle, which stands on the River Tone as it flows through the village, represents the watermill which ground the corn for the village from 1086 until World War I.

== Governance ==
The parish council has responsibility for local issues, including setting an annual precept (local rate) to cover the council’s operating costs and producing annual accounts for public scrutiny. The parish council evaluates local planning applications and works with the local police, district council officers, and neighbourhood watch groups on matters of crime, security, and traffic. The parish council's role also includes initiating projects for the maintenance and repair of parish facilities, as well as consulting with the district council on the maintenance, repair, and improvement of highways, drainage, footpaths, public transport, and street cleaning. Conservation matters (including trees and listed buildings) and environmental issues are also the responsibility of the council.

For local government purposes, since 1 April 2023, the parish comes under the unitary authority of Somerset Council. Prior to this, it was part of the non-metropolitan district of Somerset West and Taunton (formed on 1 April 2019) and, before this, the district of West Somerset (established under the Local Government Act 1972). It was part of Dulverton Rural District before 1974.

It is also part of the Tiverton and Minehead county constituency represented in the House of Commons of the Parliament of the United Kingdom. It elects one Member of Parliament (MP) by the first past the post system of election.

== Church ==
St Peter's Church dates from the 15th century, with the north aisle being built in 1534. The tower arch dates from 1703, and the building was restored in 1875–80 when the chancel arch was rebuilt. It includes a tower with five bells, one of which was made in 1790 by Thomas Bilbie of the Bilbie family in Cullompton. It has been designated by English Heritage as a Grade I listed building. The church includes stained glass claimed to be from the remains of a Jesse window from Barlynch Priory near Dulverton, and a 15th-century lectern.
