= St Petrock's Church, Timberscombe =

Church in Somerset, England

Church of St Petrock
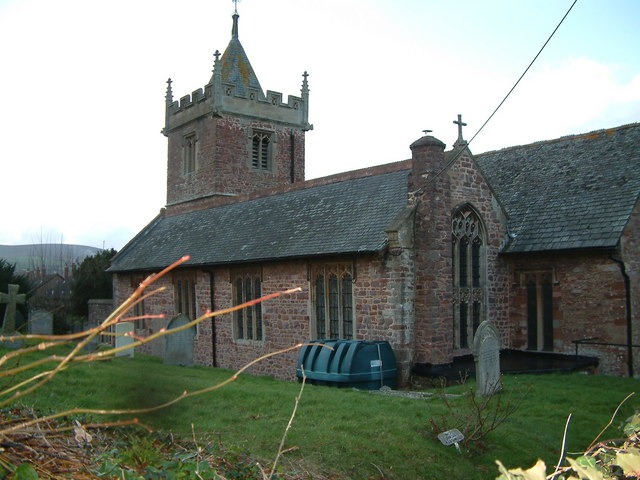

- Location within Somerset

General information
- Location: Timberscombe, England
- Coordinates: 51.168184°N 3.494716°W
- Completed: 1708

The Church of St Petrock in Timberscombe, Somerset, England has a 15th-century tower, the rest of the building dating from 1708. It has been designated by English Heritage as a Grade I listed building.

The church is dedicated to Saint Petroc, who probably visited the parish in the 6th century.

The chancel dates from around 1450, however sections of the nave walls may survive from an earlier building. Above the south doorway is a mural of David which dates from the Protestant Reformation. The font is 15th century and the pulpit from the 17th.

The tower which was built in the early 18th century, has a peal of eight bells.

The parish is part of the benefice of Grabbist Hill, which comprises Alcombe, Dunster, Timberscombe and Wootton Courtenay within the Exmoor deanery.

== See also ==
- Grade I listed buildings in West Somerset
- List of Somerset towers
- List of ecclesiastical parishes in the Diocese of Bath and Wells
