= Minehead Without =

Civil parish in Somerset, England

Coordinates: 51.204500°N 3.509000°W

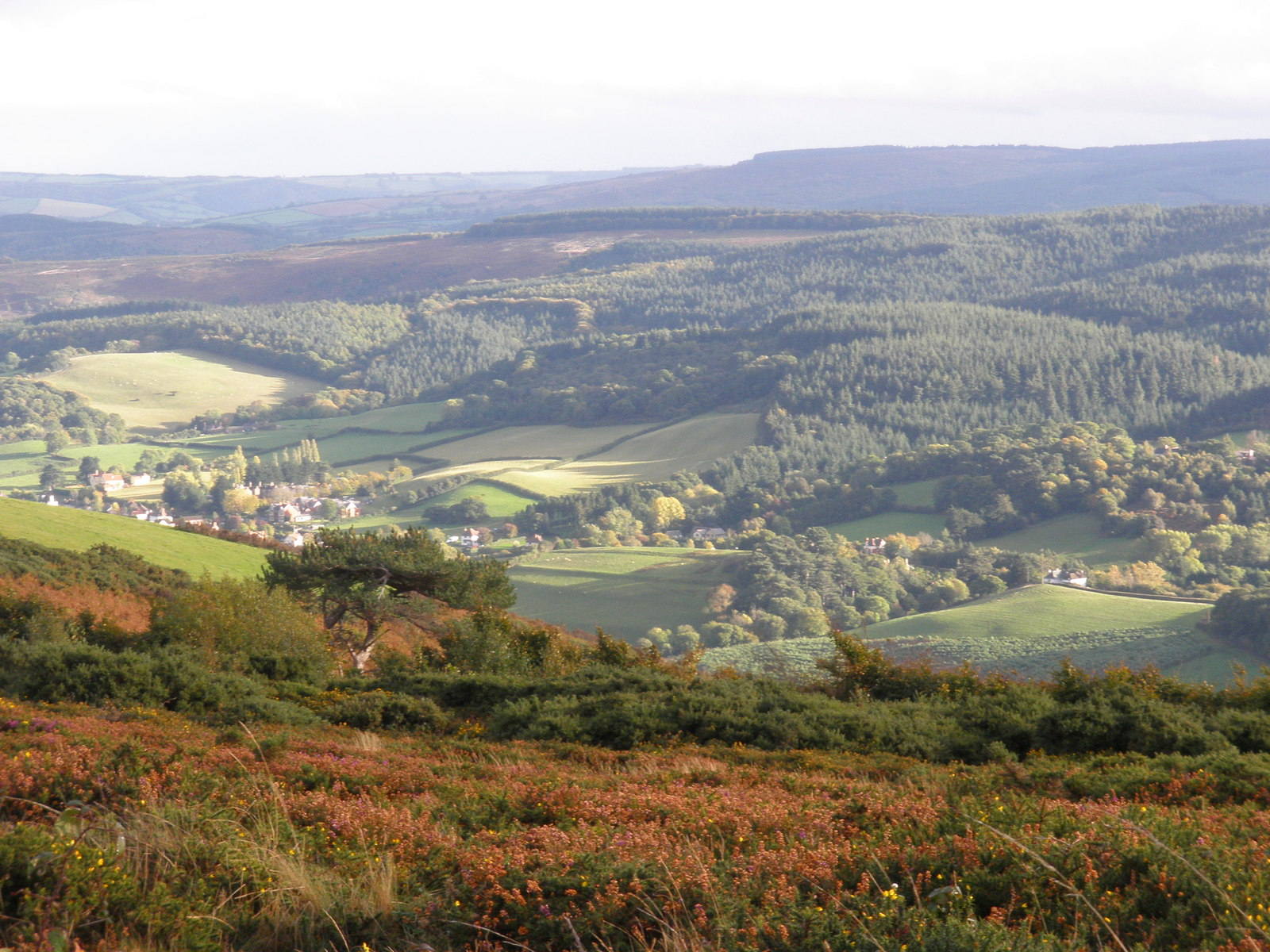
- Looking towards Bratton from the hill of Bratton Ball

- Location within Somerset
- Area: 10.31 km^{2} (3.98 sq mi)
- Population: 51 (Parish, 2021)
  - Density: 5/km^{2} (13/sq mi)
- OS grid reference: SS945461
- Civil parish: Minehead Without
- Unitary authority: Somerset Council
- Ceremonial county: Somerset
- Region: South West
- Country: England
- Sovereign state: United Kingdom
- Post town: Minehead
- Postcode district: TA24
- Dialling code: 01643
- Police: Avon and Somerset
- Fire: Devon and Somerset
- Ambulance: South Western
- UK Parliament: Tiverton and Minehead

Minehead Without is a civil parish in Somerset, England. It covers a rural area to the west of the coastal town of Minehead and lies within the Exmoor National Park. The parish was created in 1894 from the rural western part of the ancient parish of Minehead. The largest settlement in the parish is the hamlet of Bratton. At the 2021 census, the parish had a population of 51. It shares a grouped parish council with the neighbouring parish of Selworthy.

== History ==
The area historically formed part of the parish of Minehead. A local government district was established in 1891 covering the eastern part of Minehead parish around the town itself. Such districts were reconstituted as urban districts under the Local Government Act 1894, which also directed that civil parishes could no longer straddle district boundaries. The civil parish of Minehead was therefore reduced to match the urban district, and the remainder, covering the rural area to the west of the town, became a separate civil parish called Minehead Without.

Although a separate civil parish since 1894, Minehead Without remains part of the Church of England ecclesiastical parish of Minehead, which has its parish church of St Michael's in the town of Minehead.

== Governance ==
Minehead Without shares a grouped parish council with the civil parish of Selworthy. The parish council has responsibility for local issues, including setting an annual precept (local rate) to cover the council's operating costs and producing annual accounts for public scrutiny. The parish council evaluates local planning applications and works with the local police, district council officers, and neighbourhood watch groups on matters of crime, security, and traffic. The parish council's role also includes initiating projects for the maintenance and repair of parish facilities, as well as consulting with the district council on the maintenance, repair, and improvement of highways, drainage, footpaths, public transport, and street cleaning. Conservation matters (including trees and listed buildings) and environmental issues are also the responsibility of the council.

For local government purposes, since 1 April 2023, the parish comes under the unitary authority of Somerset Council. Prior to this, it was part of the non-metropolitan district of Somerset West and Taunton (formed on 1 April 2019) and, before this, the district of West Somerset (established under the Local Government Act 1972). It was part of Williton Rural District before 1974.

As Minehead Without falls within the Exmoor National Park some functions normally administered by district or county councils have, since 1997, fallen under the Exmoor National Park Authority, which is known as a ‘single purpose’ authority, which aims to "conserve and enhance the natural beauty, wildlife and cultural heritage of the National Parks" and "promote opportunities for the understanding and enjoyment of the special qualities of the Parks by the public", including responsibility for the conservation of the historic environment.

It is also part of the Tiverton and Minehead county constituency represented in the House of Commons of the Parliament of the United Kingdom. It elects one Member of Parliament (MP) by the first past the post system of election.

== Landmarks ==
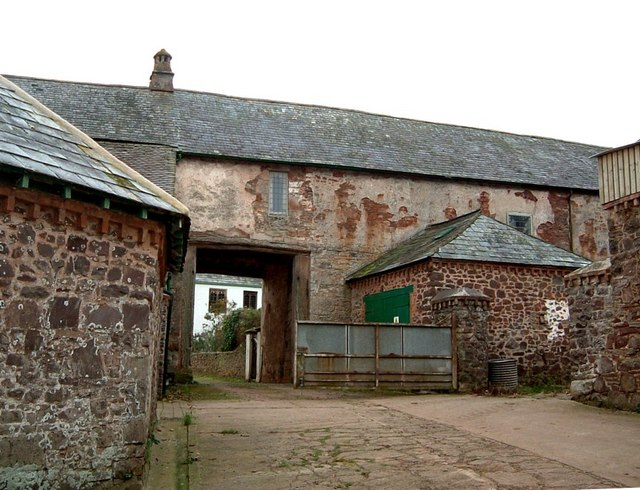
Bratton Court

Bratton Court is a manor house, parts of which date from the 14th century. It has been designated as a grade I listed building.
