= Monksilver =

Village in Somerset, England

Coordinates: 51.1322°N 3.3270°W

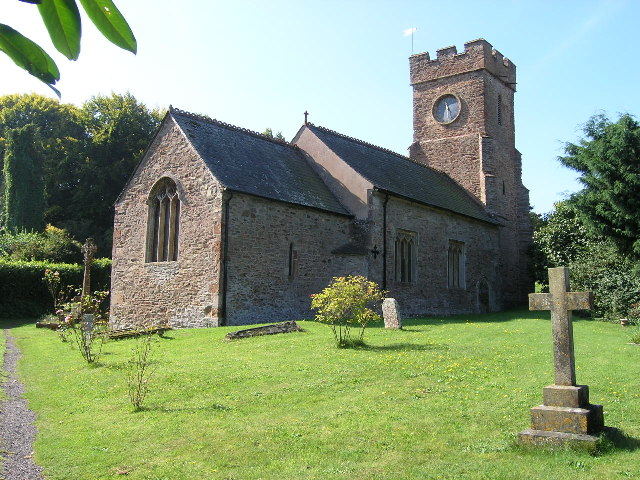
- Church of All Saints

- Location within Somerset
- Population: 113 (2011)
- OS grid reference: ST072378
- Unitary authority: Somerset Council
- Ceremonial county: Somerset
- Region: South West
- Country: England
- Sovereign state: United Kingdom
- Post town: Taunton
- Postcode district: TA4
- Dialling code: 01984
- Police: Avon and Somerset
- Fire: Devon and Somerset
- Ambulance: South Western
- UK Parliament: Tiverton and Minehead

Monksilver is a village 3 miles (5 km) west of the town of Williton in Somerset, England, on the eastern flank of the Brendon Hills and the border of the Exmoor National Park. The Coleridge Way footpath passes through the village.

== History ==
The name of the village means monk's wood. In the Domesday Book it was simply Selvre, from the Latin silva for a wood, although it has also been suggested that Sulfhere, in AD 897, referred to the silvery stream below the village.

In 1113 the manor was given by Robert de Chandos to endow Goldcliff Priory, which he had just established near Newport in Monmouthshire . In 1441 it passed, with the priory, to Tewkesbury Abbey and then in 1474 to the canons of Windsor. In the 14th century the name changed to "Monksilver".

The parish of Monksilver was part of the Williton and Freemanners Hundred. In the 16th and 17th centuries it was a centre for cloth making and field names such as "Rack", at nearby Woodford, suggest this activity.

== Governance ==
The parish council has responsibility for local issues, including setting an annual precept (local rate) to cover the council's operating costs and producing annual accounts for public scrutiny. The parish council evaluates local planning applications and works with the local police, district council officers, and neighbourhood watch groups on matters of crime, security, and traffic. The parish council's role also includes initiating projects for the maintenance and repair of parish facilities, as well as consulting with the district council on the maintenance, repair, and improvement of highways, drainage, footpaths, public transport, and street cleaning. Conservation matters (including trees and listed buildings) and environmental issues are also the responsibility of the council.

For local government purposes, since 1 April 2023, the parish comes under the unitary authority of Somerset Council. Prior to this, it was part of the non-metropolitan district of Somerset West and Taunton (formed on 1 April 2019) and, before this, the district of West Somerset (established under the Local Government Act 1972). It was part of Williton Rural District before 1974.

The village lies within the Tiverton and Minehead county constituency represented in the House of Commons of the Parliament of the United Kingdom. The constituency elects one Member of Parliament (MP) by the first past the post system of election.

== Religious sites ==
The parish church, dedicated to All Saints, has a square tower containing five bells. Inside is an Easter sepulchre. The pulpit is 16th-century, the screen is Jacobean and the lectern is possibly older. The wagon roof is thought to be 13th-century and an alms box by the door is from 1634. It has been designated by English Heritage as a Grade I listed building. In 1583 Sir Francis Drake married his second wife Elizabeth Sydenham, of nearby Combe Sydenham in the parish of Stogumber, at the church.

== Amenities ==
The village has a village hall (shared with the parishes of Nettlecombe and Elworthy), a telephone box and a newspaper hut. The village pub, The Notley Arms, serves locally sourced food. The village is served twice a week with a bus service connecting it to Taunton. The mobile library visits every three weeks.

The village lies on the route of both the Coleridge Way and Samaritans Way South West.
