= Withycombe =

Village and civil parish in Somerset, England

Coordinates: 51.1642°N 3.4100°W

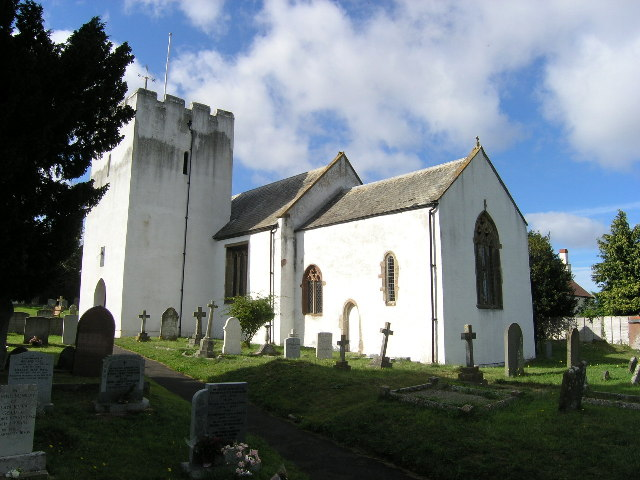
- Church of St Nicholas, Withycombe

- Location within Somerset
- Population: 293 (2011)
- OS grid reference: SS825385
- Unitary authority: Somerset Council
- Ceremonial county: Somerset
- Region: South West
- Country: England
- Sovereign state: United Kingdom
- Post town: Minehead
- Postcode district: TA24
- Police: Avon and Somerset
- Fire: Devon and Somerset
- Ambulance: South Western
- UK Parliament: Tiverton and Minehead

Withycombe is a village, civil parish, and former manor 2.5 miles (4 km) south east of Dunster, and 5 miles (8 km) from Minehead within the Exmoor National Park in Somerset, England. The parish includes the village of Rodhuish. The manor house of the manor of Withycombe survives as Sandhill Farm.

== History ==
The Domesday Book of 1086 lists Withycombe as one of the possessions of Geoffrey de Montbray, Bishop of Coutances, whose tenant there was Edmer. His heir was Robert Mowbray, who forfeited his estates to the crown for rebelling against William II, who regranted many of the Somerset estates to the Mohun family, henceforth feudal barons of Dunster.

The manor of Withycombe was centred on the village. In about 1212 the manor was split into two separate sub-manors, which took various names over time, dependent on the family name of their lords. By the 16th century the names of the two manors were "Withycombe Wyke" (or Weeke, etc.) and "Withycombe Hadley". The former manor house of Withycombe Hadley survives as Court Place in the village of Withycombe.

The Hadley family inherited the manor of Withycombe by marriage to the heiress of the Durborough family. The manor passed to the Lutterell family when Margaret Hadley married Thomas Luttrell in 1560. At some time before 1777 John Fownes Luttrell acquired the other sub-manor of Withycombe Weke, and thus the manor of Withycombe was unified to its pre-1212 position.

On Rodhuish Common, within the parish, is a univallate Iron Age hill fort.

Withycombe was part of the hundred of Carhampton.

== Governance ==
The parish council has responsibility for local issues, including setting an annual precept (local rate) to cover the council's operating costs and producing annual accounts for public scrutiny. The parish council evaluates local planning applications and works with the local police, district council officers, and neighbourhood watch groups on matters of crime, security, and traffic. The parish council's role also includes initiating projects for the maintenance and repair of parish facilities, as well as consulting with the district council on the maintenance, repair, and improvement of highways, drainage, footpaths, public transport, and street cleaning. Conservation matters (including trees and listed buildings) and environmental issues are also the responsibility of the council.

For local government purposes, since 1 April 2023, the parish comes under the unitary authority of Somerset Council. Prior to this, it was part of the non-metropolitan district of Somerset West and Taunton (formed on 1 April 2019) and, before this, the district of West Somerset (established under the Local Government Act 1972). It was part of Williton Rural District before 1974.

It is also part of the Tiverton and Minehead county constituency represented in the House of Commons of the Parliament of the United Kingdom. It elects one Member of Parliament (MP) by the first past the post system of election.

== Religious sites ==
The Church of St Nicholas dates from the 13th century and has been designated by English Heritage as a grade I listed building. Hidden in a wall recess is a figure of an unknown man with long hair and a hat, which is one of the earliest church monuments to include a hat. He is carrying a heartcase to show he died elsewhere and only his heart was brought to the church for burial.

The Church of St Bartholomew, Rodhuish was built in the 15th century. It is a Grade II* listed building.
