= Stogumber =

Village and civil parish in Somerset, England

Coordinates: 51.1296°N 3.2947°W

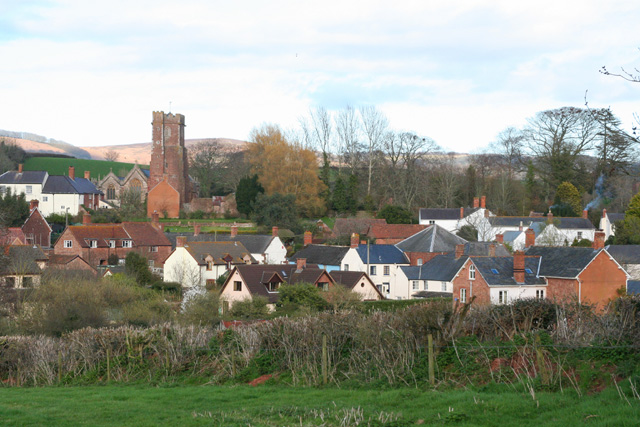

- Location within Somerset
- Population: 702 (2011)
- OS grid reference: ST095375
- Unitary authority: Somerset
- Ceremonial county: Somerset
- Region: South West
- Country: England
- Sovereign state: United Kingdom
- Post town: Taunton
- Postcode district: TA4
- Dialling code: 01984
- Police: Avon and Somerset
- Fire: Devon and Somerset
- Ambulance: South Western
- UK Parliament: Tiverton and Minehead

Stogumber (/stəˈɡʌmbər/) is a village and civil parish in Somerset, England, on the eastern flank of the Brendon Hills. Besides Stogumber village itself, the parish includes the hamlets of Ashbeer, Capton, Escott, Higher Vexford, Kingswood, Lower Vellow, Lower Vexford, Preston, and Vellow. The village is on the route of the Samaritans Way South West.

== History ==
The name comes from the Old English Stoke, meaning 'place' or 'dairy farm', with the addition in 1225 of the personal name Gunner.

Approximately 0.8 miles (1.3 km) north-west of the village is Curdon Camp a univallate Iron Age hill fort. The camp was nearly completely destroyed by quarrying and bulldozing.

The parish of Stogumber was part of the Williton and Freemanners Hundred.

The manor of Stogumber was held from 1286 by the Andleys family, and later by the Sydenhams (1396–1626) and Notleys (from 1896).

Five fulling mills were established in the village between the 13th and 18th century to support the clothmaking industry.

A 19th-century limekiln in Lower Vellow was originally attached to a quarry.

== Governance ==
The parish council has responsibility for local issues, including setting an annual precept (local rate) to cover the council's operating costs and producing annual accounts for public scrutiny. The parish council evaluates local planning applications and works with the local police, district council officers, and neighbourhood watch groups on matters of crime, security, and traffic. The parish council's role also includes initiating projects for the maintenance and repair of parish facilities, as well as consulting with the district council on the maintenance, repair, and improvement of highways, drainage, footpaths, public transport, and street cleaning. Conservation matters (including trees and listed buildings) and environmental issues are also the responsibility of the council.

For local government purposes, since 1 April 2023, the parish comes under the unitary authority of Somerset Council. Prior to this, it was part of the non-metropolitan district of Somerset West and Taunton (formed on 1 April 2019) and, before this, the district of West Somerset (established under the Local Government Act 1972). It was part of Williton Rural District before 1974.

It is also part of the Tiverton and Minehead county constituency represented in the House of Commons of the Parliament of the United Kingdom. It elects one Member of Parliament (MP) by the first past the post system of election.

== Landmarks ==
Combe Sydenham is a Grade I listed 15th-century manor house.

Hartrow Manor was a late-16th-century manor house.

== Transport ==
Stogumber railway station is an intermediate station on the West Somerset Railway, now a steam-operated heritage railway operating between Bishops Lydeard, near Taunton, and Minehead.

== Religious sites ==
The parish Church of St Mary dates from the late 13th century. It has been designated as a Grade I listed building. It was founded as a Saxon minster with a chapelry at Bicknoller and other dues payable from property in Monksilver, Clatworthy and Elworthy. The Old Vicarage which is a now private dwelling, was built in the 15th century. The old brewhouse behind the vicarage is medieval in origin.

The Chantry chapel in Vellow was licensed as the Chapel of Our Lady Sweetwell in 1542.

The Baptist Church in Brook Street dates from the 19th century.

== Notable residents ==
- George Fredrick Curtis (1906–2005), the founding dean of the University of British Columbia Faculty of Law was born in the village.
- Zilpha Margetts nee Major was born on 1 November 1825 in Stogumber, where her family worked in tailoring and shoe-making. C. 1854 she sailed for Salt Lake City where she married a fellow English expat Thomas Margetts. They decided to return to England but were caught in a skirmish on 10 September 1856, on the Oregon Trail near Fort Kearny in Nebraska. Thomas was killed and Zilpha was held captive by Cheyenne and never ransomed.
- Elizabeth Sydenham of Combe Sydenham married Sir Francis Drake in the village in 1583.
- Richard Tucker Founder of (now) Portland, Maine, in 1633 was born in Stogumber in 1594.

== In literature ==
John de Stogumber is the name of a chaplain in George Bernard Shaw's play Saint Joan. The name was selected after Shaw contacted the local rector to check that there was no-one living with the surname.

Gabriel Stogumber is the name of a Bow Street Runner investigating the robbery of a consignment of newly minted gold sovereigns in Georgette Heyer's novel The Toll-Gate.
