= Mackesy =

Mackesy is an anglicized surname of Irish origin - from the gaelic Ó Macasa.

== Origins and variants ==
The first known mention of the name is by the historian Giolla na Naomh Ua hUidhrín (O'Heerin) who died in 1420. He noted 'Macassa' among the principle families of the "Chonall" (probably the Ui Chonaill Gabhra) alongside Collins, Mulholland, MacEniry, O’Bilraidhe, and O’Bearga, and wrote the following poem:

"Corco Oiche of the delightful woods,
The country of white mantles and clear streams,
A fair land of great fertility,
Is governed by O'Maolmackessy."

The Corca Oíche were an ancient Irish tribe that lived in what is now south-west County Limerick, between Newcastle West and Cleanglass on the border of County Cork.

The eponymous ancestor is unclear. There could be three options:

1. It could mean 'descendant of Macus', possibly a form of Maghnus

2. It could refer to a "Maiccassa", whom the Book of Lecan specifically names as the ancestor of the Corca Oíche, providing the following pedigree:

Fergus Foga, mac Oiche, mac Fiachna, mac Fiachrach, mac Conall, mac Donnchad, mac Fedlimid, mac Aengusa, mac Maiccassa

3. It could come from Mac Cathasaigh. The Book of Lecan also mentions Clan Cathasaigh as one of several Clans of the Corca Oíche that descend from Maiccassa and also provide his pedigree:

Cathasach, mac Fiacha, mac Conall, mac Donnchad, mac Fedlimid, mac Aengusa, mac Maiccassa

The Corca Oíche likely became vassals to the FitzGeralds after the Norman invasion. After the Desmond rebellions, the lands of the O'Mackessy's (tuath Corca Oiche) were confiscated and awarded to protestant royalists. The last time the tuath Corca Oiche was mentioned was in Peyton's survey, calling it the Toghe Gortcoythe. It was then broken up into smaller parishes and townlands. The O'Mackessy's were likely displaced as a result.

Individuals carrying the surname do appear in various records from time to time. A Gillepatrik O'MaolMackessy is named in a pardons alongside Oliver FitzGerald of Shangenagh and Morett, Queen's county on May 31st, 1566. The 1766 Religious Census records several Mackessys near Cashel, County Tipperary and a Mackesy at Glanworth, County Cork as papists. However, a branch of Mackesys from Ballymackesy, County Wexford, married into the protestant Dillon family not long after. According to the Down Survey, Carey Dillon, 5th Earl of Roscommon was granted lands around Ballymackesy after they were confiscated from the Dorans in the mid 17th Century. This line of Mackesys also produced Rev. William Mackesy (Rector of Clashmore, Co. Waterford then Castletown, Co. Meath), probably the brother of Thomas Lewis Mackesy, confirming their religious affiliation.

Perhaps as a result of their displacement, the name has left its mark on several Irish place names:

- Ballymackesy (Baile Uí Mhacasa), County Limerick, situated a few kilometres south of Newcastle West.
- Ballymacasy, County Kerry near Ballylongford, formerly known as Ballymaccassey in tithe records from the 19th Century[30]
- Ballymackesy County Wexford (written as Ballimackisy in the Down Survey, also as Maxistowne, Ballymackissy, Ballymacassy, Ballinakissy among others).

Regardless of the origin, the name is often connected with the anglicized surname Mackesy, O'Mackesy, O'Mackesey, Mackessy, Macassy, Macasey, Maxey, M'Asey, M'Assie and M'Casey etc.

== Notable people with the surname: ==
- Thomas Mackesy (1790–1869), Irish surgeon
- William Mackesy (1837–1914), British and Indian Army officer, nephew of Thomas
- Pierse Joseph Mackesy (1883–1956), British Army officer, son of William
- Charles Ernest Randolph Mackesy (1861–1925), New Zealand farmer and army officer, nephew of William
- Piers Mackesy (born 1924), British military historian, son of Pierse
- Serena Mackesy (born 1962), English journalist and novelist, daughter of Piers
- Charlie Mackesy (born 1962), British artist, nephew of Piers
