= St Francis of Assisi Church, Notting Hill =

Coordinates: 51.5098°N 0.2108°W

St Francis of Assisi Church
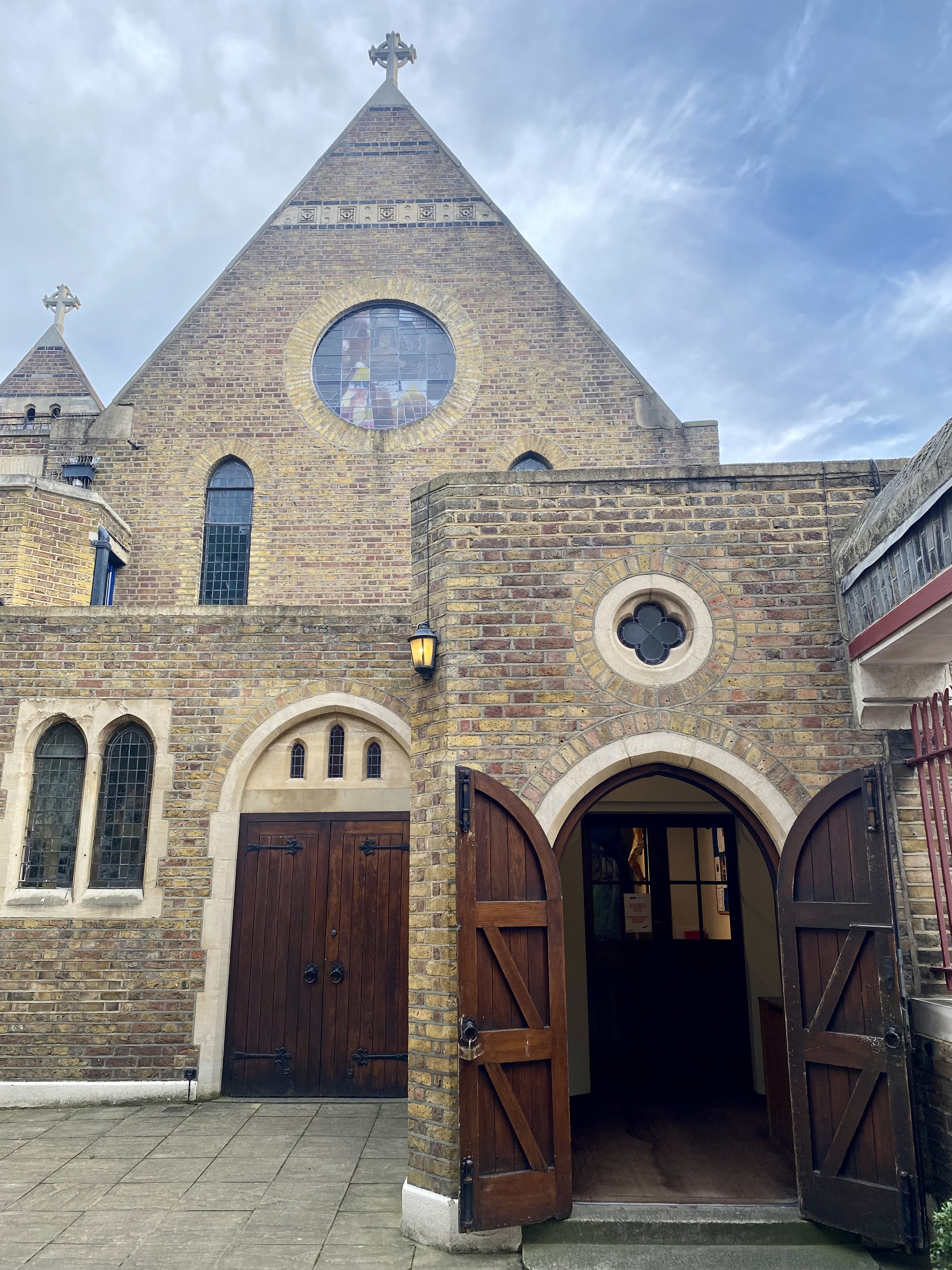
- St Francis of Assisi Church
- Location: Notting Hill
- Country: England
- Denomination: Roman Catholic
- Website: Official website

History
- Status: Parish church
- Founder: Henry Rawes
- Dedication: Francis of Assisi

Architecture
- Functional status: Active
- Heritage designation: Grade II* listed
- Designated: 15 April 1969
- Architect(s): Henry Clutton; John Francis Bentley
- Style: Gothic Revival
- Groundbreaking: 1859
- Completed: 2 February 1860

Administration
- Province: Westminster
- Archdiocese: Westminster
- Deanery: North Kensington
- Parish: Notting Hill

St Francis of Assisi Church is a Roman Catholic parish church on Pottery Lane in Notting Hill, Borough of Kensington and Chelsea, London. It was built from 1859 to 1860 and designed by Henry Clutton and John Francis Bentley. It is a Gothic Revival church founded by the Oblates of St Charles and particularly, Fr Henry Rawes who paid for it. It is situated on Pottery Lane, southwest of Avondale Park in Notting Hill, and is a Grade II* listed building.

== History ==
=== Foundation ===
In 1857, the Oblates of St Charles Borromeo were founded in Bayswater by Henry Edward Manning. They were a group of Catholic priests living in community, serving a local church. Manning was asked to start the mission there by the Archbishop of Westminster, Cardinal Wiseman. That mission soon grew and from it, was built St Mary of the Angels Church, Bayswater, which was designed by Henry Clutton and John Francis Bentley. Once the church was completed, Manning sent a group of Oblates headed by Henry Rawes to start a church on Pottery Lane in Notting Hill.

=== Construction ===
In 1859, work started on the construction of the church. The building of the church was entirely paid for by Henry Rawes, a priest and local superior of the Oblates in Notting Hill. Like the previous church, the Oblates also asked Henry Clutton and his assistant John Francis Bentley to design this one. The church was initially designed by Clutton. Bentley, under Clutton's supervision, designed the furnishings. On 2 February 1860, the church was opened.

=== Extensions by Bentley ===
Within a year of its opening, the church was too small to accommodate the growing congregation. From 1861, the church was extended, which Bentley was hired to design. It was his first independent architectural commission. A presbytery, baptistry, and porch were built. In March 1861, the St John side altar, designed by Bentley and Nathaniel Westlake, was built. In 1863, the lady chapel altar, high altar, reredos, reliquaries, and confessional were added. In 1864, the porch and chancel were renovated. In 1865, Bentley donated more furnishings to the church, such as the cover for the baptismal font, a monstrance, processional cross, candlesticks and vestments. Between 1865 and 1870, the stations of the cross, designed by Westlake, were constructed. In 1862, Bentley converted to Catholicism. He would go on to design numerous churches and in particular, Westminster Cathedral. According to Historic England, on 16 April 1862, Bentley was "apparently the first person to be baptised in the font he designed," and "he took his middle name, Francis, from the dedication of the church."

=== Further additions ===
In 1882, a dais was built over the baptistry and the presbytery was extended. From 1907 to 1913, Osmond Bentley, John Francis Bentley's son, worked on the church. He did more work on the baptistry (built by Hardman & Co.), added grilles and doors and did further work on the lady chapel. In 1917, Frederick Walters, was behind the addition of the piscina in the sanctuary. In 1926 and 1960, the church was again redecorated. In 1982, the primary school moved to a new site and its former building became the parish hall. On 4 October 1982, the hall was opened by David Konstant, then an auxiliary bishop of the Westminster archdiocese, who also blessed an Arthur Fleischmann–designed statue of St Francis of Assisi. In 1983–1984, in work by Williams & Winkley, the altar rails were removed and the altar was brought forward. In 2008, a new stained-glass window was added. It was designed by Benjamin Finn and blessed by the Archbishop of Westminster Cardinal Cormac Murphy O'Connor. In 2010, the stonework, floor and artwork around the sanctuary was repaired and restored.

== Interior ==
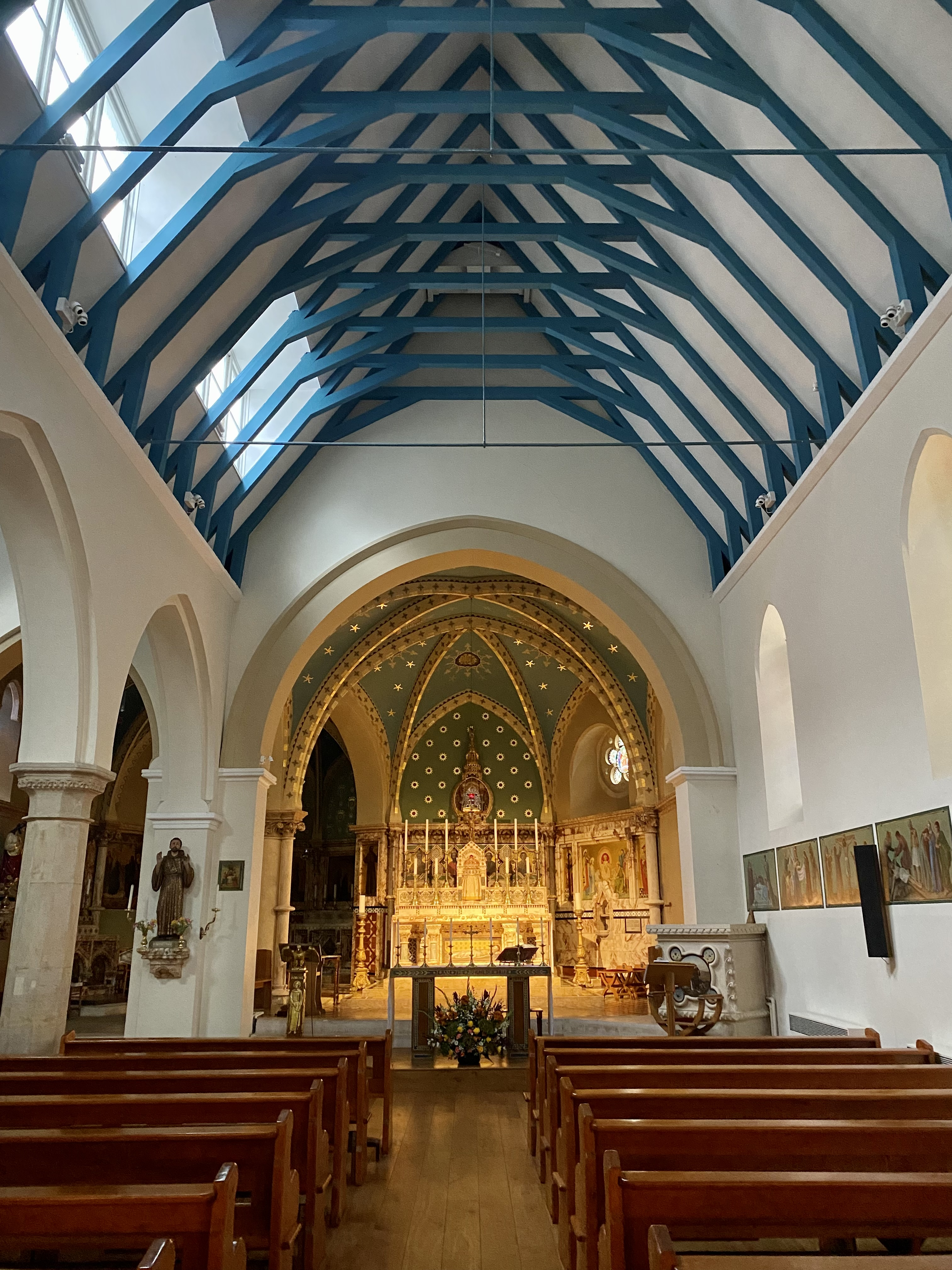
Main altar

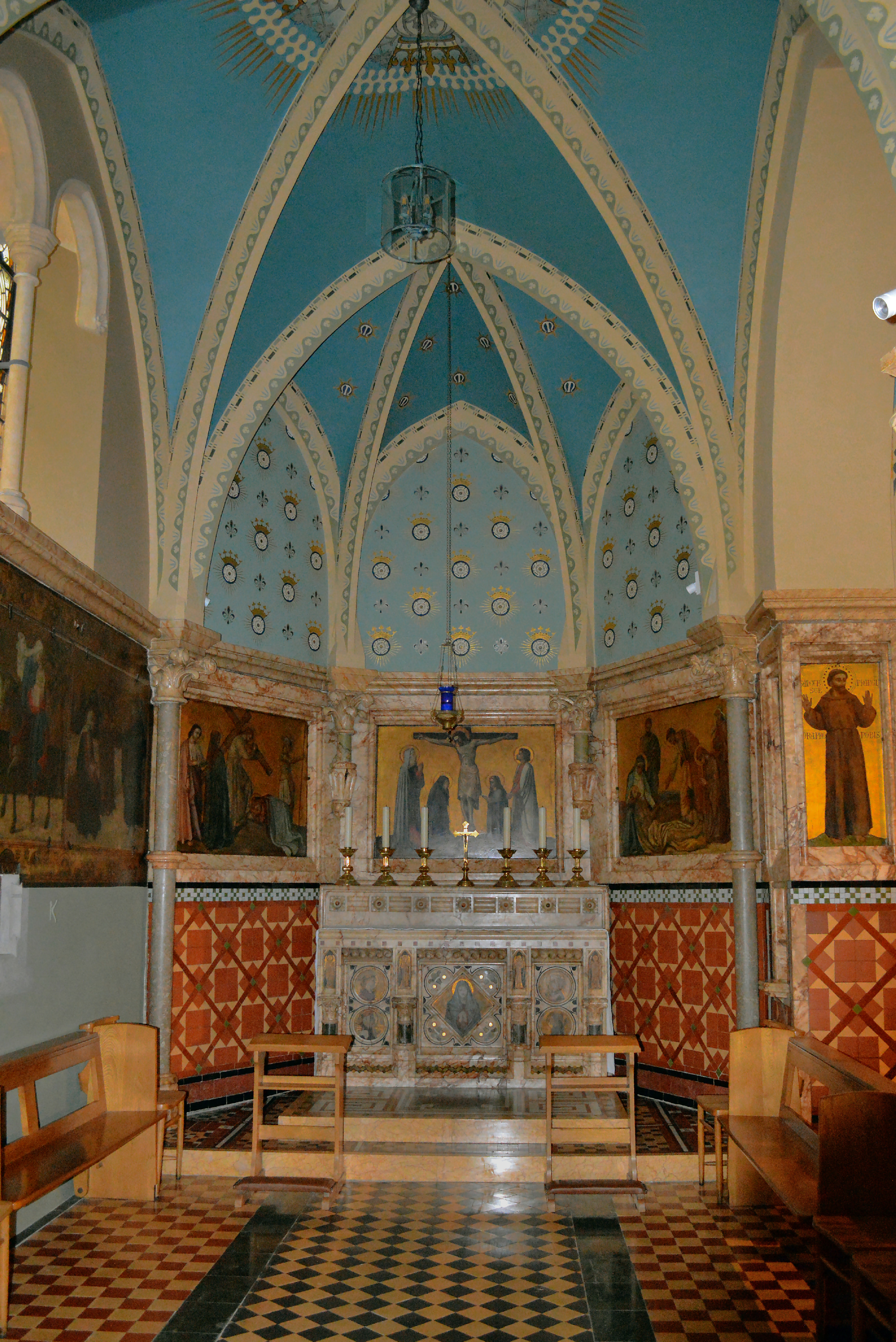
Side chapel

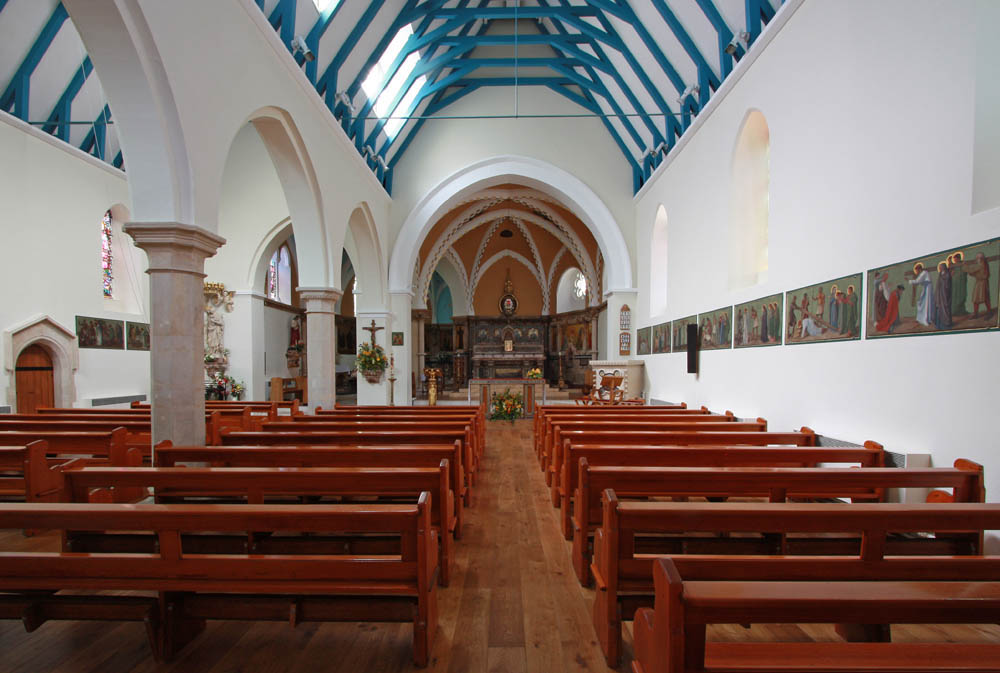
Interior before redecoration

== See also ==
- Archdiocese of Westminster
