= Henry Augustus =

Henry Augustus may refer to:

- Henry Augustus Buchtel (1847–1924), American public official and educator
- Henry Augustus Ellis (1861–1939), Irish Australian physician and federalist
- Henry Augustus Muhlenberg (1823–1854), American politician
- Henry Augustus Pilsbry (1862–1957), American biologist, malacologist, and carcinologist
- Henry Augustus Rawes (1826–1885), Catholic hymn writer and preacher
- Henry Augustus Rowland (1848–1901), U.S. physicist
- Henry Augustus Stephen (1941–2021), Venezuelan singer
- Henry Augustus Ward (1834–1906), American naturalist

== See also ==
- Augustus Henry
