= Serena Mackesy =

British novelist and journalist

Serena E. Mackesy (born 1962), pen name Alex Marwood, is a British novelist and journalist who lives in London.

== Education and career ==
Born in Ploughley, Oxfordshire, in 1962, Serena Mackesy is the daughter of the Scots-born Oxford military historian Piers Mackesy. She is also the granddaughter on her mother's side of the novelist Margaret Kennedy and on her father's side of Leonora Mackesy (born 1902), who wrote Harlequin romances as Leonora Starr and Dorothy Rivers, and her husband Pierse Joseph Mackesy. Her great-grandfather, Lieutenant-General William Mackesy, came from a family of Irish doctors. She is the cousin of artist-writer Charlie Mackesy and grew up on the Oxfordshire/Gloucestershire border and went to school in Oxford, gaining a University of London degree in English literature from Manchester College, Oxford.

Mackesy worked variously in offices, as an English teacher and in door-to-door sales before, as she told an interviewer in 2000: "I arrived at The Independent as a temp to cover for the secretary on the TV listings page... for a couple of weeks, realised I'd found somewhere I enjoyed and somehow never left.... I think the first writing I did was little potted movie previews on the weekend TV spread. The first thing anyone seemed to actually notice was a small daily bar review I used to write when the paper had a London supplement." By 1997 she was a regular columnist.

As a child, Serena Mackesy was a keen rider. She has described Malta as her favourite place in the world.

== Novels ==
Mackesy established her reputation with the novel The Temp (1999). It went into the Sunday Times Top Ten on publication. Since then, she has published Virtue (2000), Simply Heaven (2002), and Hold My Hand (2008).

In 2012, she adopted the pseudonym "Alex Marwood" with the publication of the psychological thriller The Wicked Girls which became a word-of-mouth bestseller in the UK, and was translated into 17 languages. It was included in Stephen King's Entertainment Weekly list of "The Ten Best Books I read this year" in 2013 and was shortlisted for an ITW award in the same year. The book won the Edgar Allan Poe Award (best paperback original) in 2014 and is also shortlisted for the Macavity Awards and Anthony Awards in the United States. A follow-up, The Killer Next Door, was published in 2014 followed in 2016, by The Darkest Secret.

Work of Mackesy's has been translated into 19 languages. Writers she admires include Kurt Vonnegut, C. S. Lewis (Narnia series), John Donne, and the "other" Elizabeth Taylor (Angel).

== Awards and recognition ==
- 2013, shortlisted, ITW award
- 2014, winner, Edgar Allan Poe Award
- shortlisted, Macavity Awards
- shortlisted, Anthony Awards
