= Ó Coileáin =

Irish family name

Collins.

Ó Coileáin (Middle Irish: Ua Cuiléin) is a Modern Irish surname generally belonging to the descendants of the last leading family of the Uí Chonaill Gabra, a sept and small but notable overkingdom of medieval and ancient Ireland, based in western County Limerick. Throughout much of their history the Uí Chonaill Gabra were in turn the leading sept of the greater regional overkingdom of the Uí Fidgenti, considered among the highest ranked princes or flatha in all the Province of Munster. Ó Coileáin/Ua Cuiléin is most commonly anglicized O'Collins and O'Cullane. The surname has also long been found in County Cork, believed largely due to the migration there, probably in the late 12th or early 13th century, of a junior branch of the County Limerick dynasty.

== Kings of Uí Chonaill Gabra ==
AT1155.12: Two kings of Ó Conaill Gabhra .i.e. Ó Cindfaeladh, son of Conchobhair, and Ó Cuilén, son of Conchobhar, fell one day among themselves.

MCB1156.1: Cuiléan Ó Cuiléin, king of Uí Chonaill Gabhra, was killed by Ó Cinn Fhaoladh, and he himself was killed forthwith in retribution.

AI1177.4: An expedition by Domnall Ua Donnchada, {i.e. the son of Amlaíb Mór Ua Donnchada, king of Uí Echach and champion of larmumu}, and by Cuilén Ua Cuiléin with the nobles of Desmumu to raid In Machaire, and they took away many cows. Peace was afterwards made by the son of Mac Carthaig and by the Uí Briain.

AC1266: Mahon o'Cullen, Prince of the Cloenglasse, was killed with a stab of a knife by his own wife for jealousy.

== Carbery branch ==
It is believed that what is probably a junior branch of the Uí Chonaill kings joined their distant kin the O'Donovan family of the Uí Chairpre Áebda, another great sept of the Uí Fidgenti, in their exodus to Carbery in West Cork between the late 12th and early 13th centuries.

AI1177.3: Great warfare this year between Tuadmumu and Desmumu, and from Luimnech to Corcach and from Clár Doire Mór to Cnoc Brénainn was laid waste, both church and lay property. And the Uí Meic Caille and the Uí Liatháin came into the west of Ireland, and the Eóganacht Locha Léin came as far as Férdruim in Uí Echach, the Ciarraige Luachra into Tuadmumu, and the Uí Chonaill and Uí Chairpri as far as Eóganacht Locha Léin.

MCB1177.2: A great war broke out between Domhnall Mór Ó Briain and Diarmaid Mór Mac Carthaigh, and they laid waste from Limerick to Cork, and from Clár Doire Mhóir and Waterford to Cnoc Bréanainn, both church and lay property. The Uí Mac Caille fled southwards across the Lee into Uí Eachach, the Eóghanacht Locha Léin fled to Féardhruim in Uí Eachach, the Ciarraighe Luahra into Thomond, the Uí Chairbre, the Uí Chonaill, and the Uí Dhonnabháin into Eóghanacht Locha Léin, and to [the country] around Mangarta.

== Modern ==
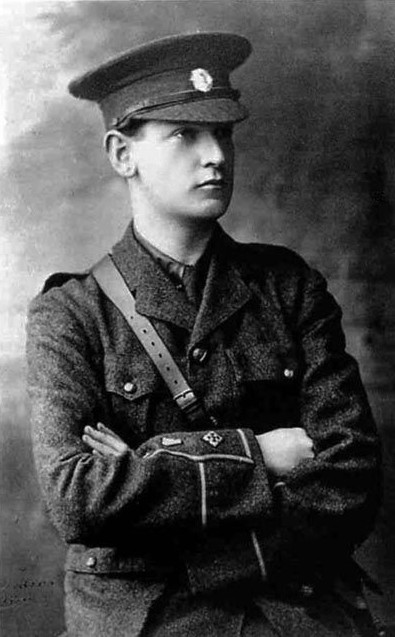
Mícheál Ó Coileáin in 1916.

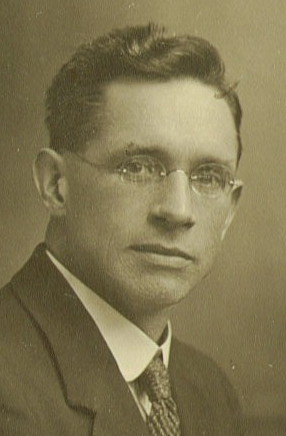
Conchobhar Ó Coileáin

- Michael Collins believed his family were descendants of the Uí Chonaill Gabra. They belonged to the minor landed gentry of Carbery, and were situated in the right place, very near to O'Donovan country, for this to be quite plausible.
- Con Collins, County Limerick politician
- Mountcollins, village in the extreme southwest of County Limerick.
