= Mountcollins =

Village in County Limerick, Ireland

Mountcollins Cnoc Uí Choileáin (Irish)
- Village
- Location in Ireland
- Country: Ireland
- Province: Munster
- County: County Limerick

Population (2022)
  - Total: 234
- Time zone: UTC+0 (WET)
  - Summer (DST): UTC-1 (IST (WEST))
- Irish Grid Reference: R150200

Mountcollins (Irish: Cnoc Uí Choileáin) is a village in the extreme south west of County Limerick, Ireland, barely 100 metres from the border with County Kerry and just a mile from County Cork. The River Feale runs parallel to the village and is fed by the Caher River that divides the village. Mountcollins is in the parish of Mountcollins-Tournafulla.

The local post office closed a few years ago. The last grocery shop closed in 2008. The village skyline is dominated by a large Roman Catholic church with an 80-foot steeple which can be plainly seen from both bordering County Cork and County Kerry. When entering the village from either end there are very narrow bridges which only one car can cross over at a time.

== History ==
Tournafulla-Mountcollins parish was formed in 1838 from part of the parish of Killeedy. Until 1586, Mountcollins had been part of the parish of Monagea. The present-day population of the parish is about 1,500 people.

Mountcollins was formerly called Knockroedermot. The area used to be called the "Munster Coalfield". A large tract of land was reclaimed here in the middle of the nineteenth century. There are hills to the north and southeast, and the land is mainly boggy. In the past, there was little more than a road in Mountcollins and people used to say, "I'm going to the road" in reference to it. During the famine in Mountcollins, a number of new roads were laid as part of the relief works that began nationwide in an effort to alleviate the immense poverty that existed at the time.

Mountcollins got its present name from Fr. Luke Collins. Fr. Collins served as priest to both Abbeyfeale and Mountcollins from the 1730s until his death in 1775. Fr Collins first said mass in a building on a hill called 'the Mount', which is the site of the present-day church. Hence the name Mountcollins.

The Ó Coileáin ruled Southwest Limerick from the fourth to the thirteenth century. The area was called the Tuath of Corca Oíche, after the clan. The Gaelic lords of the Corca Oíche took the name Ó Macasa which became anglicised as Mackessy. To the east of Corca Oíche lay the lands of the Ó Coileáin called Claonghlais. The name Ó Coileáin was anglicised as Collins.

== Employment ==
Agriculture is the main source of income for most locals, with the majority of the remainder commuting to neighbouring Abbeyfeale and Limerick for more commercial and industrial employment.

== See also ==
- List of towns and villages in Ireland
