= John Francis Bentley =

English ecclesiastical architect

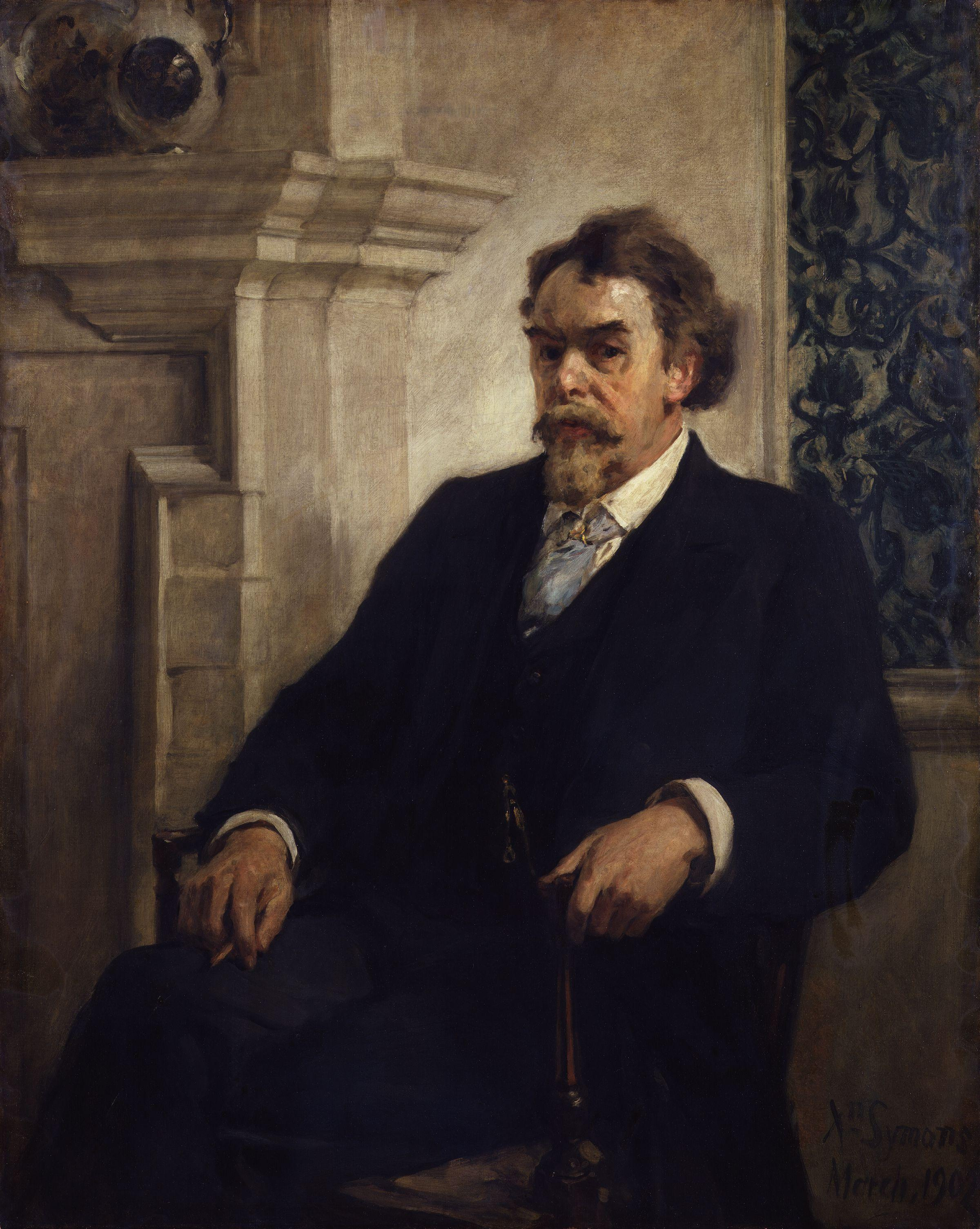
Portrait of John Francis Bentley by William Christian Symons, 1902

John Francis Bentley (30 January 1839 – 2 March 1902) was an English ecclesiastical architect whose most famous work is the Westminster Cathedral in London, England, built in a style heavily influenced by Byzantine architecture.

== Life ==
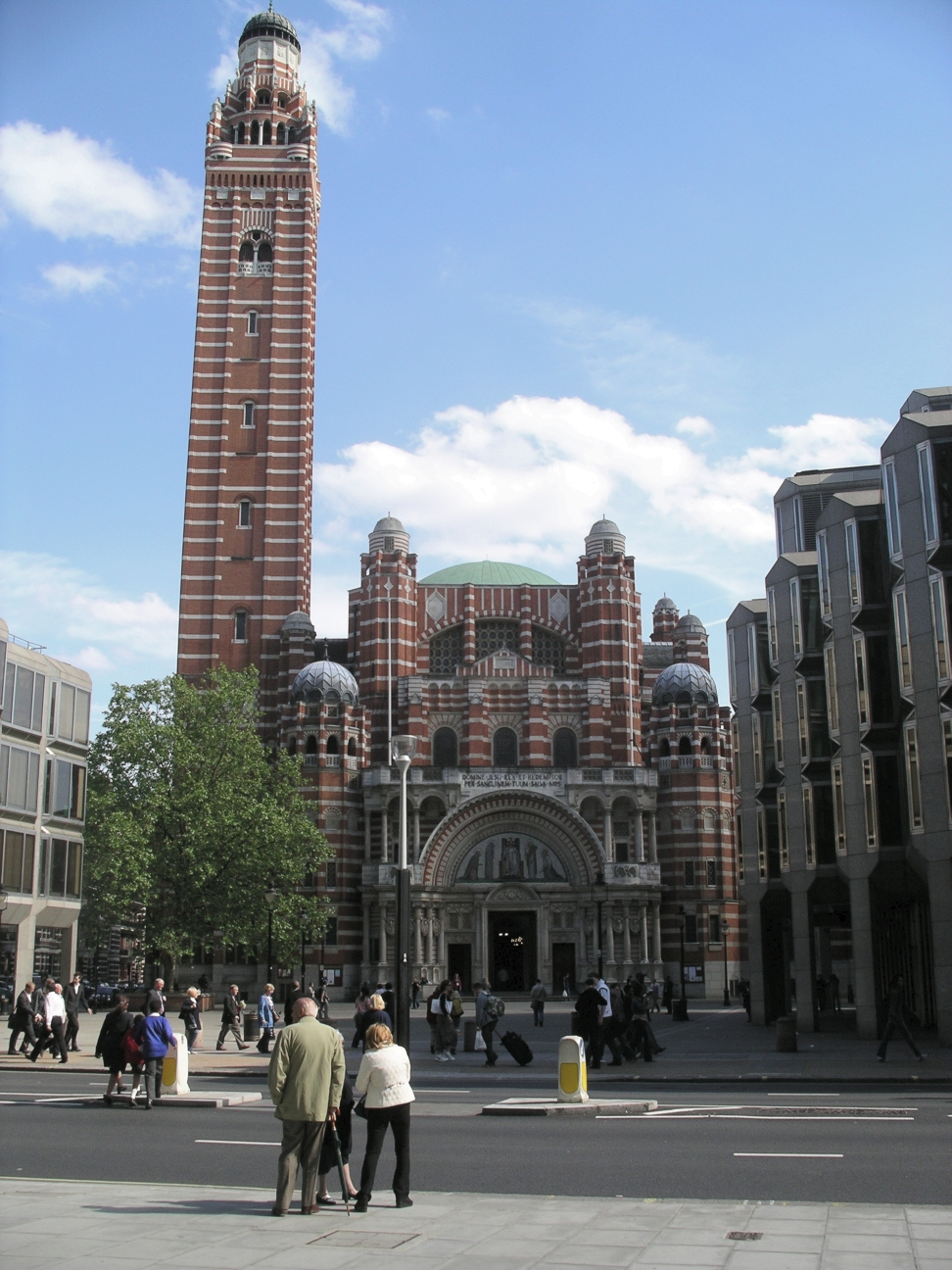
Westminster Cathedral was designed by John Francis Bentley and constructed between 1895 and 1903.

Bentley was born in Doncaster. In 1839, he was associated with the firm of Holland & Hannan. He was an apt modeller and had tried his hand with success at stone carving. He studied under Henry Clutton, where he worked on St Francis of Assisi Church, Notting Hill, before branching out on his own in 1868. St Francis of Assisi Church was important to Bentley and marked a change in his life. He designed and donated various parts of the church, in particular he was behind the construction of the bapistry and its font. In 1862, Bentley converted to Catholicism. On 16 April 1862, he was baptised in the same font that he himself had designed. For his middle name, he chose "Francis" after the church he helped design and was baptised in. After his baptism there, he continued to donate various furnishings to the church such as the cover of the font.

His first important commission was from Cardinal Manning, for the seminary at Hammersmith. Examples of his work include Holy Rood Church, Watford, St John's Beaumont School, Corpus Christi Church, Brixton, St Mary's, Cadogan Street, Chelsea (1879), the high altar at St Gabriel's, Warwick Square, and St Luke's Church, Chiddingstone Causeway (1897), and the Sacred Heart Chapel at the Jesuit Church of the Immaculate Conception, Farm Street. Though much of his work was in the neo-Gothic style, he was selected to create a Byzantine Revival design for Westminster Cathedral.

The great opportunity of Bentley's career came in 1894, when he was commissioned to design a new Roman Catholic cathedral in Westminster, London. After deciding on a Byzantine Revival design, Bentley travelled to Italy to study some of the great early Byzantine-influenced cathedrals, such as St Mark's Basilica in Venice. Because of illness and an outbreak of cholera in Istanbul, he was unable to complete his tour with a study of the Hagia Sophia. Bentley ended his tour in Venice and returned to London to begin work on Westminster Cathedral.

Bentley's grave in Mortlake

George Williamson describes him as a person of brusque, reserved manner, but kind and friendly to those who knew him. He had the strongest dislike to the preparation of show drawings and to the system of architectural competition and, being a man wholly lacking in self-assertion, and reticent in conversation, was never as well known in general circles as he deserved to be. His great characteristics as an architect were his careful attention to detail, his solicitude that all the fittings should be in perfect harmony with the building.

In 1874 he married Margaret Annie Fleuss; they had 4 sons and 7 daughters. Their house in Clapham has a blue plaque.

Bentley was awarded the gold medal of the Institute of Architects in February 1902, but never received it, as on 1 March he was seized with paralysis and died the following morning in Clapham. He is buried at St Mary Magdalen Church, Mortlake.

== Architectural work ==
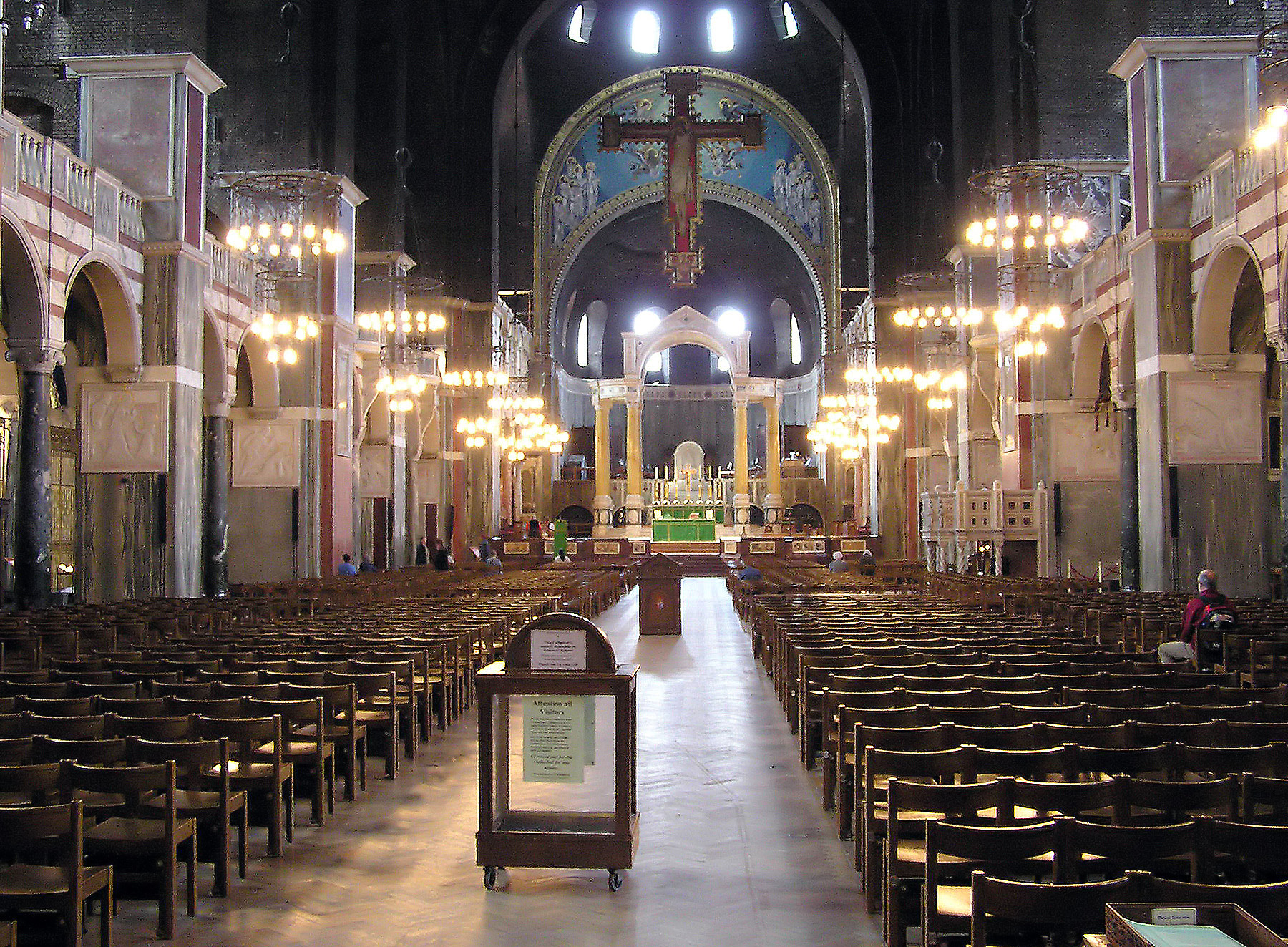
Westminster Cathedral, interior looking east

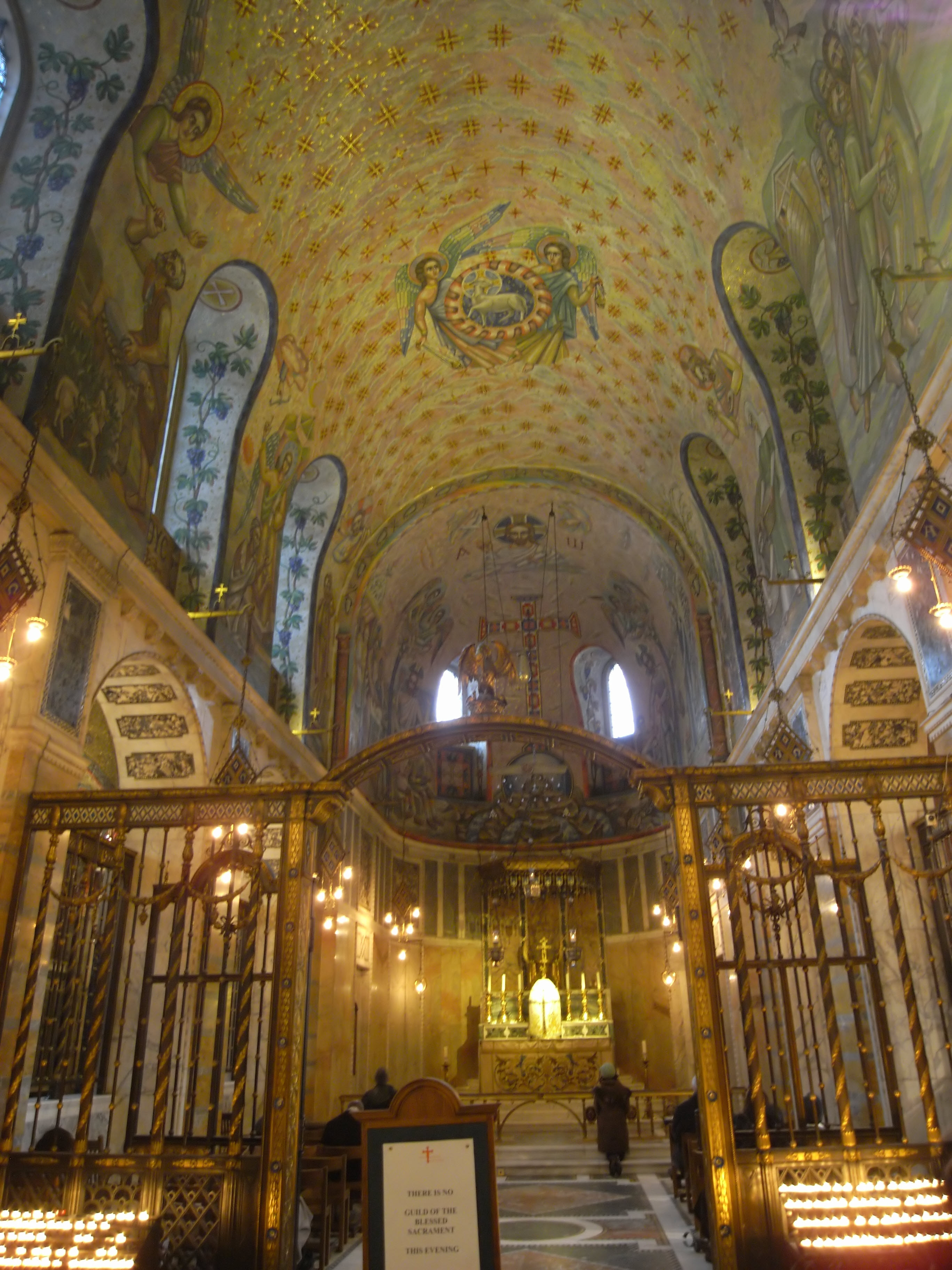
Westminster Cathedral, Chapel of the Blessed Sacrament

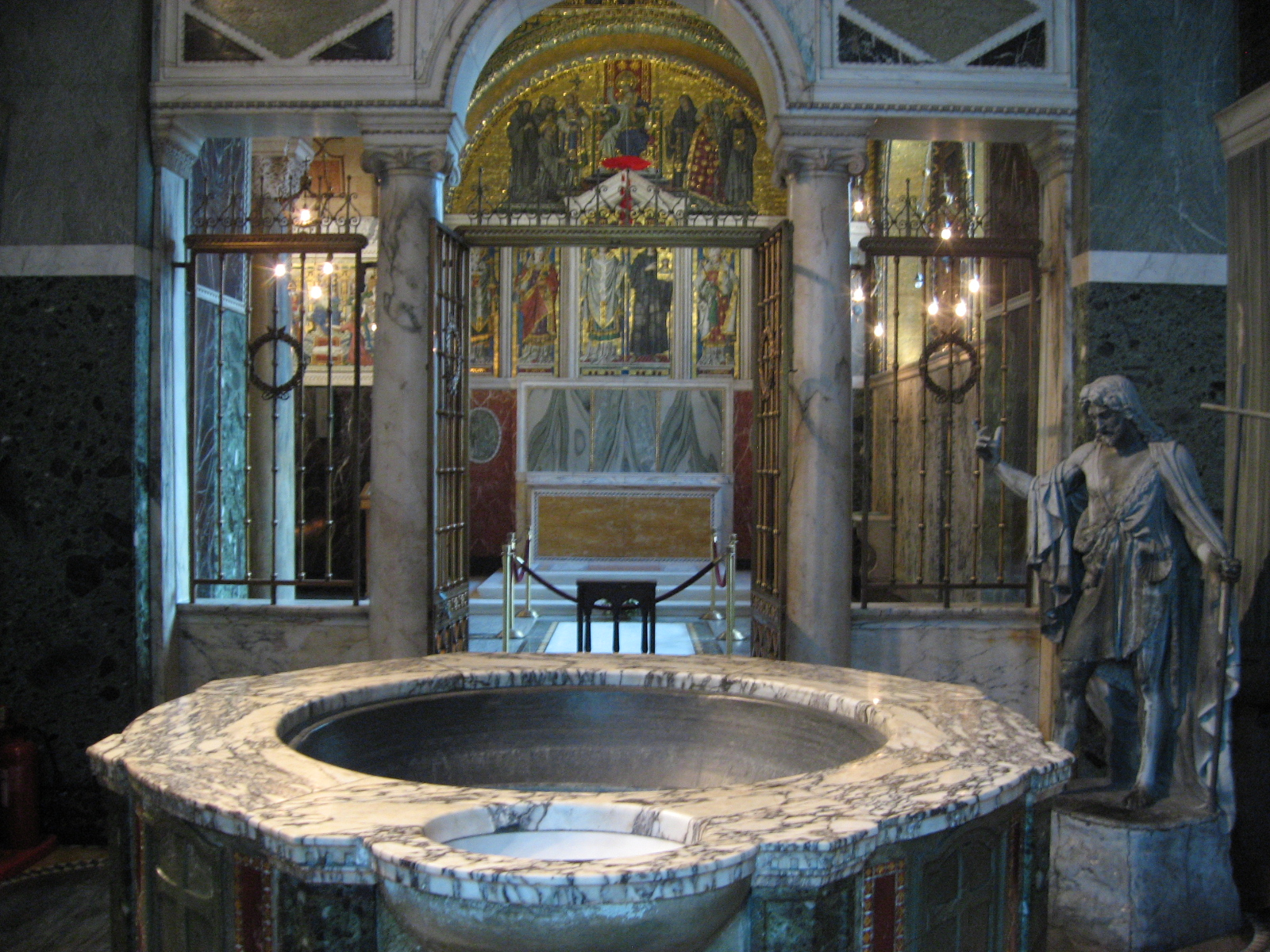
Westminster Cathedral, The Baptistry

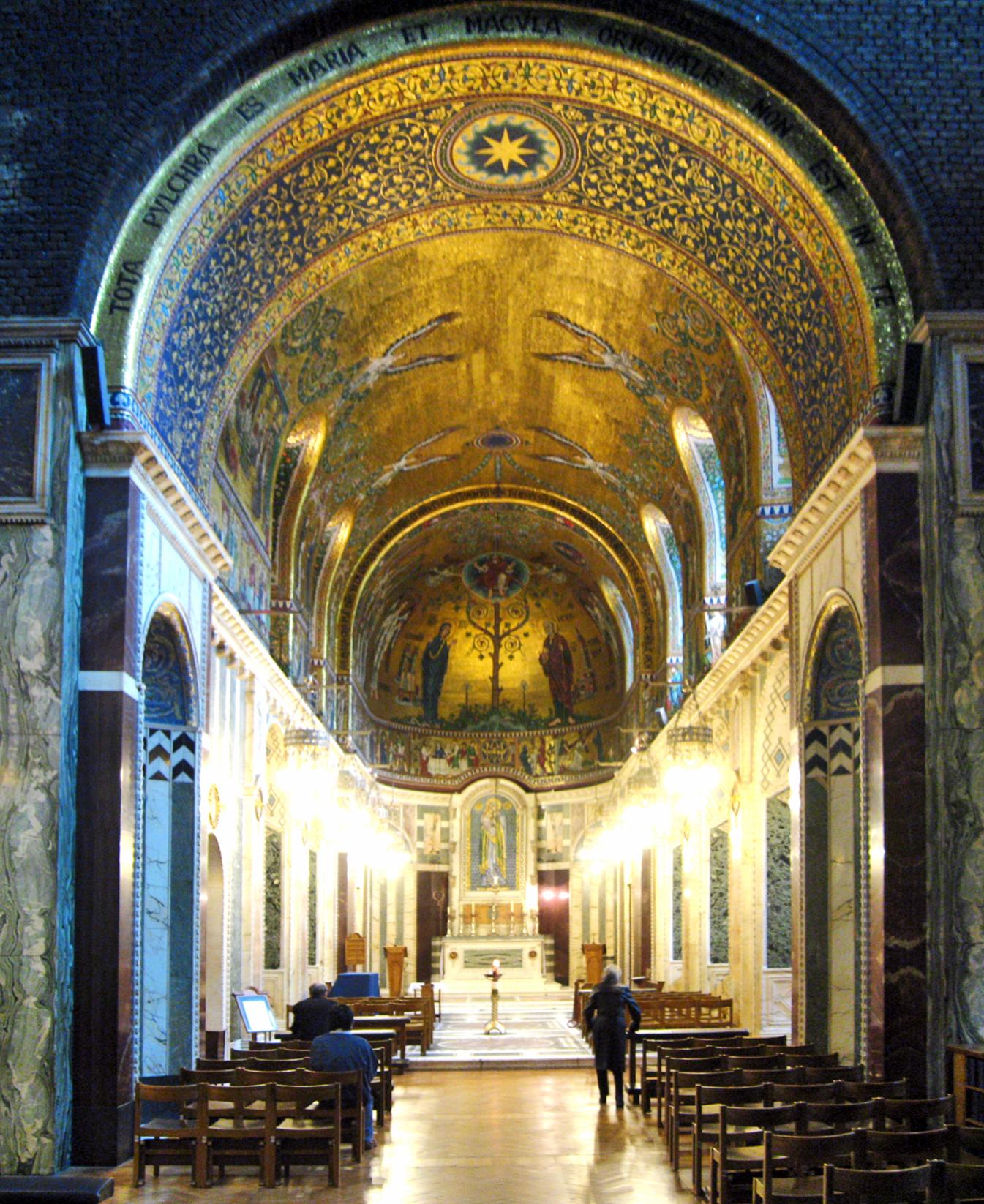
Westminster Cathedral, The Lady Chapel

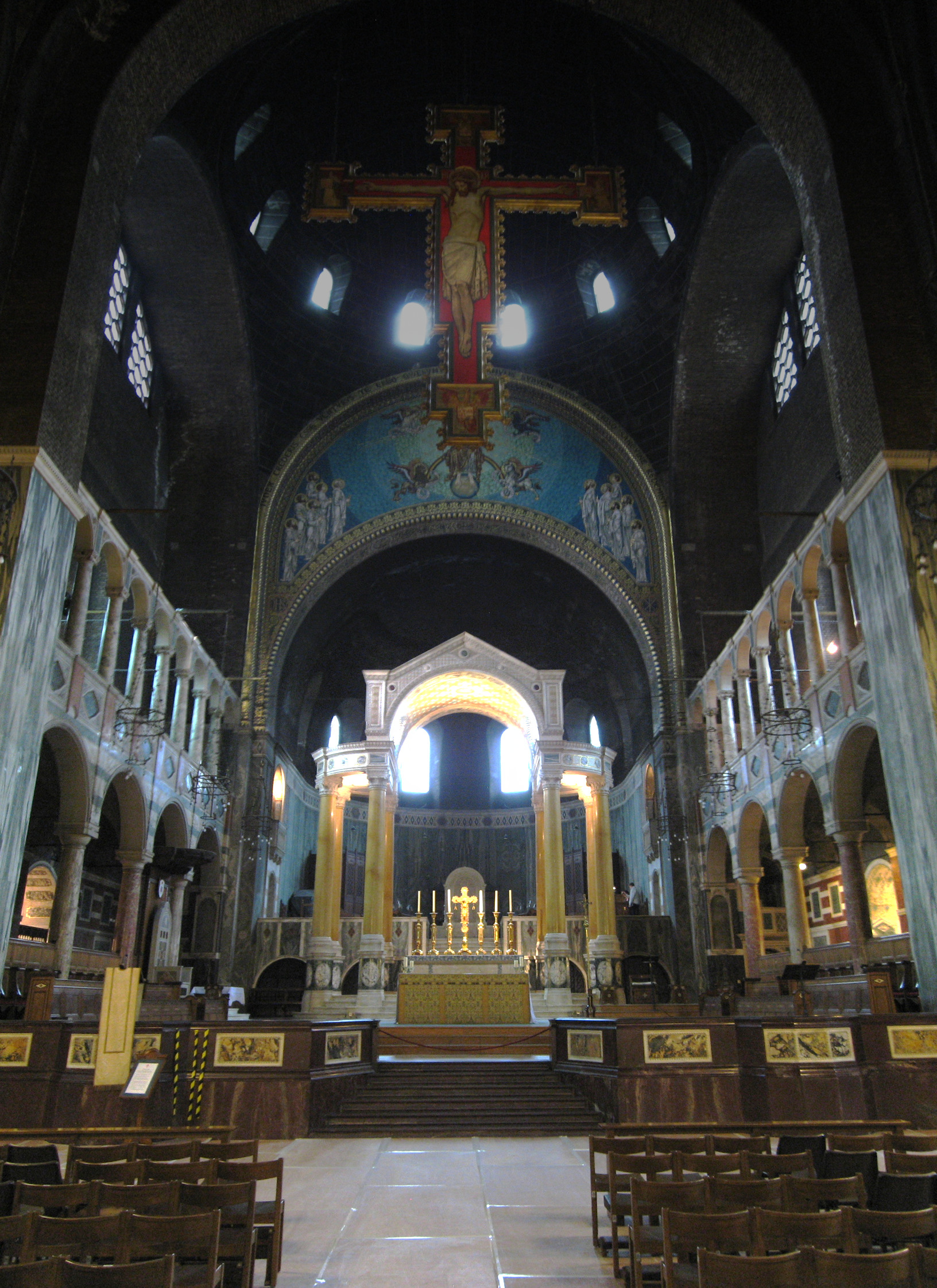
Westminster Cathedral, The Sanctuary

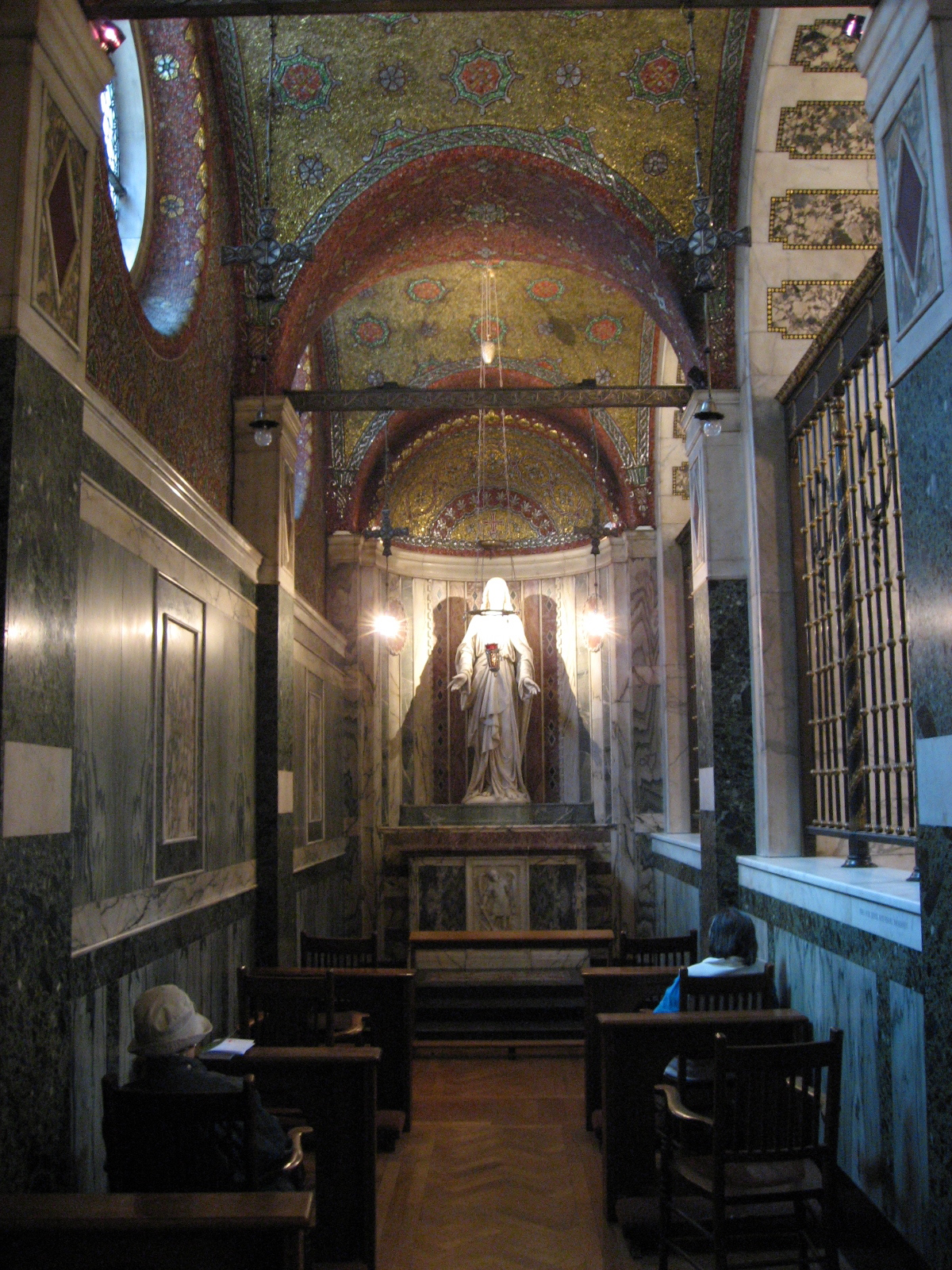
Westminster Cathedral, The Shrine of the Sacred Heart and St Michael

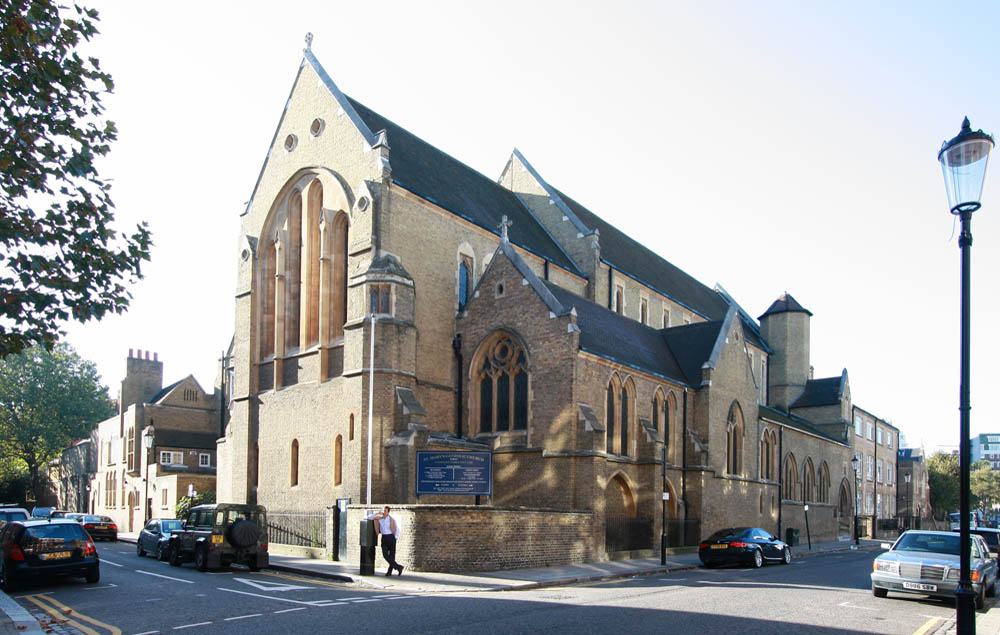
St Mary's, Cadogan Street

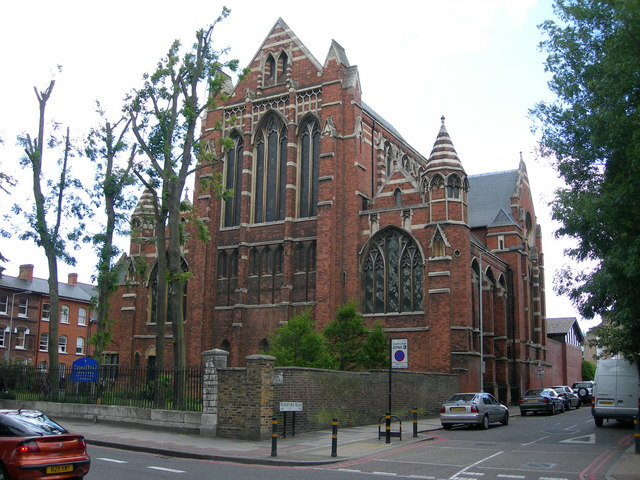
Corpus Christi Church, Brixton

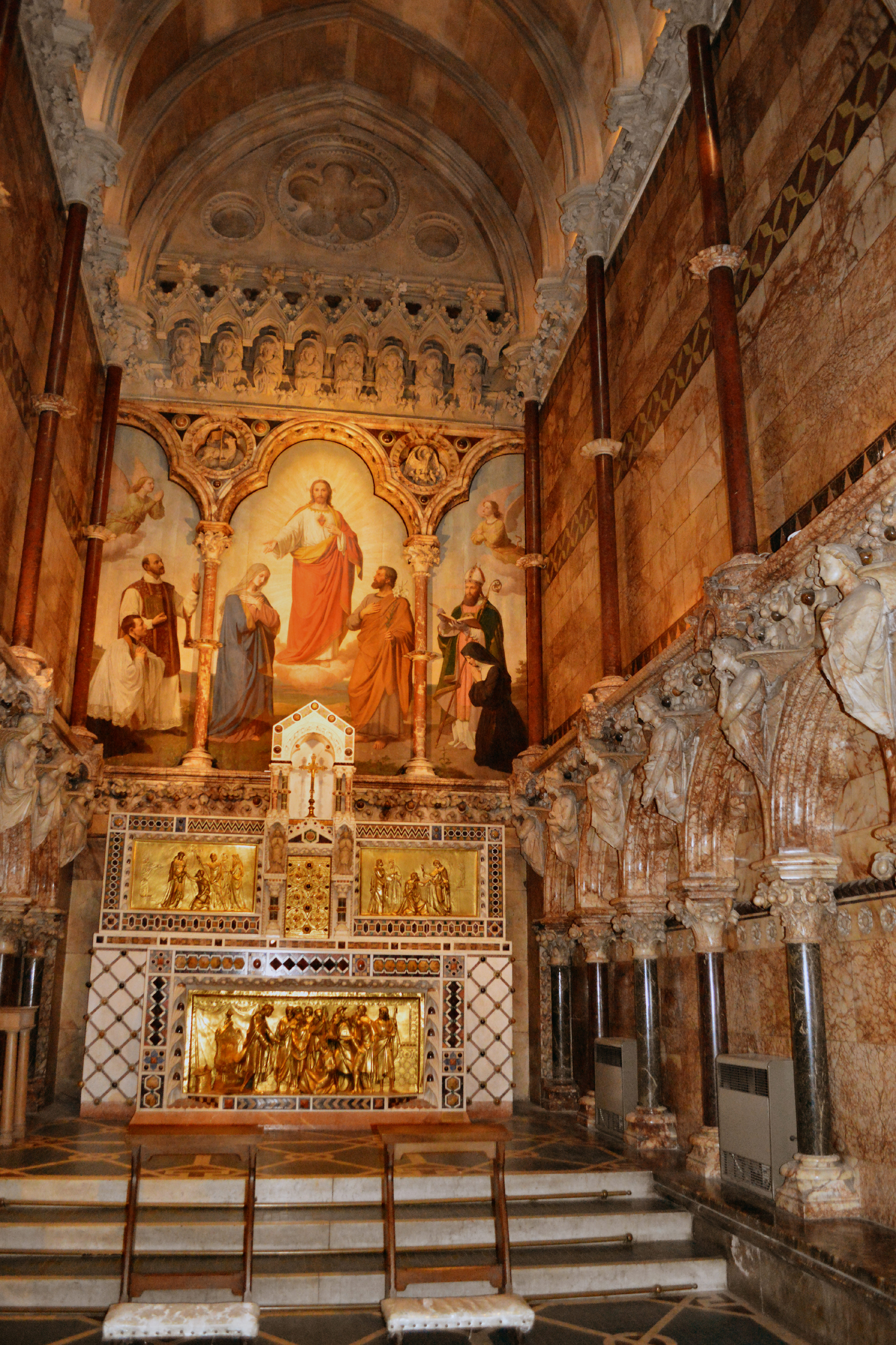
Church of the Immaculate Conception, The Sacred Heart Chapel

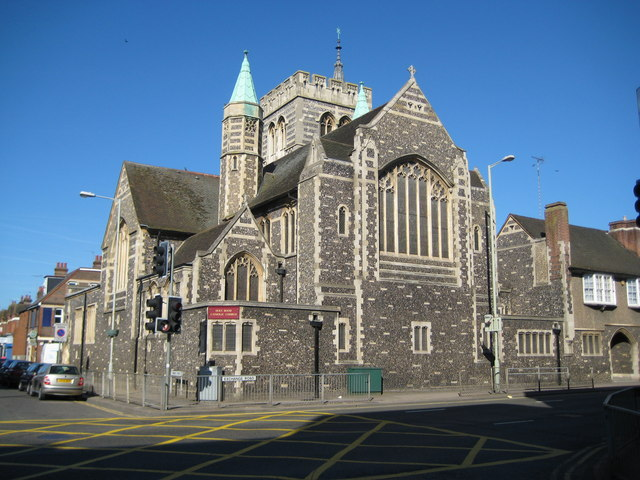
Holy Rood Church, Watford

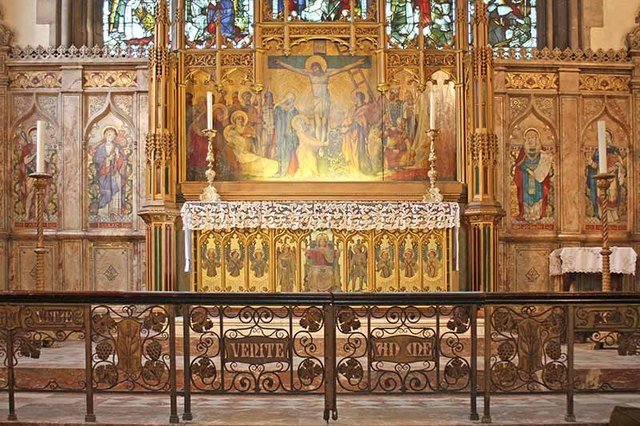
St Gabriel's Church, Warwick Square, Sanctuary

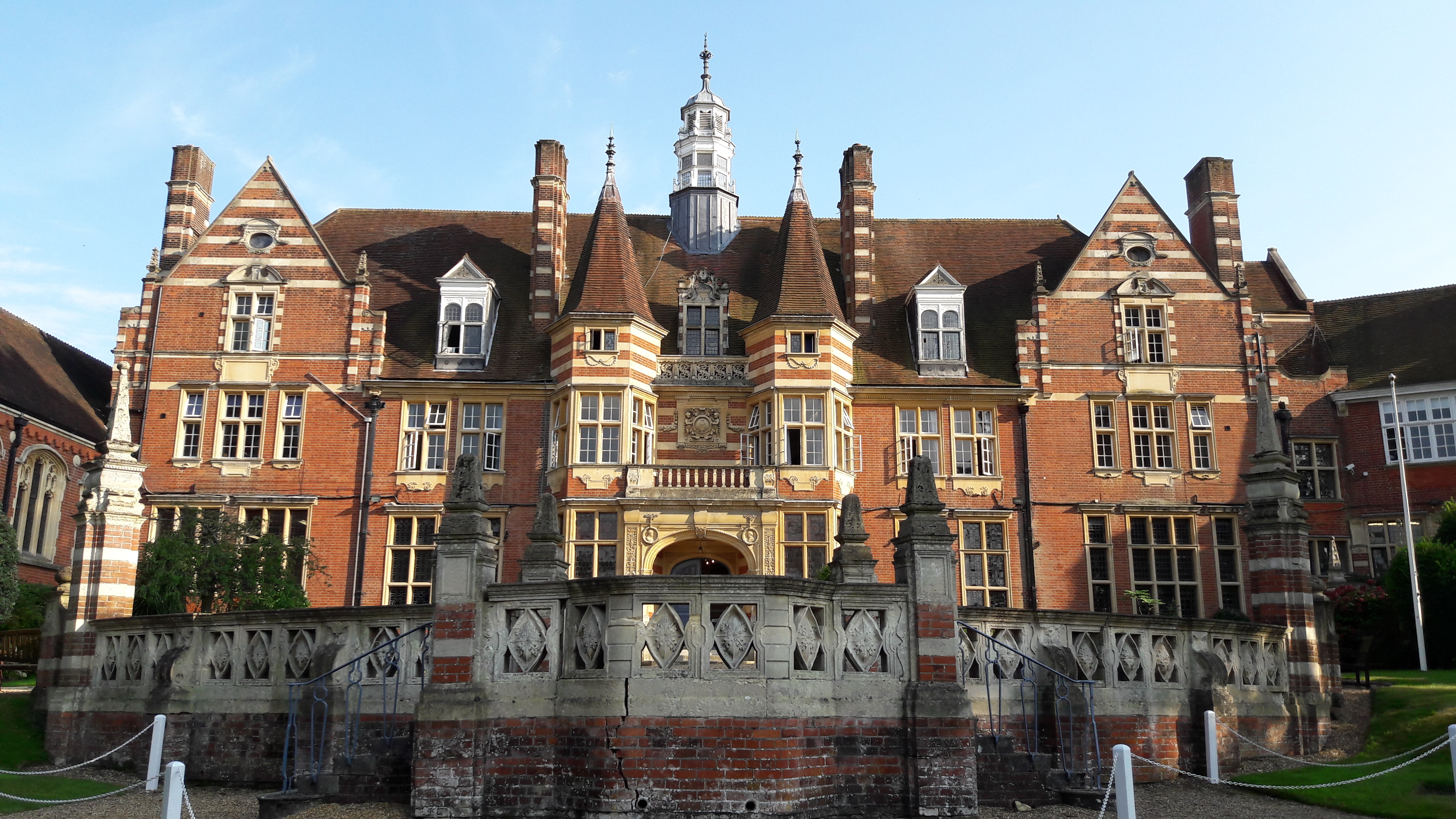
St John's Beaumont School

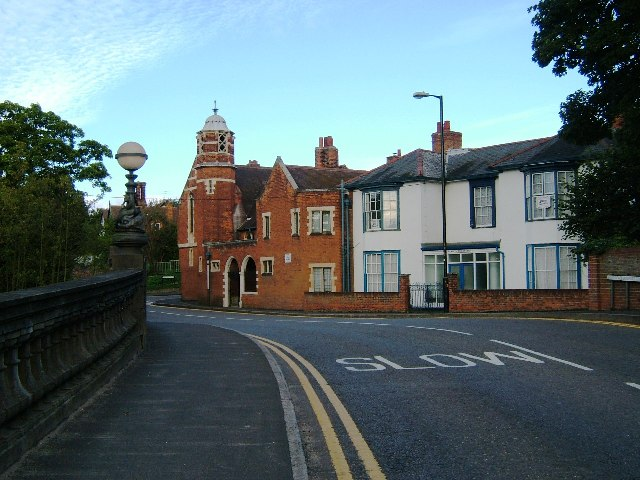
Chapel of the Immaculate Conception, Franciscan Convent

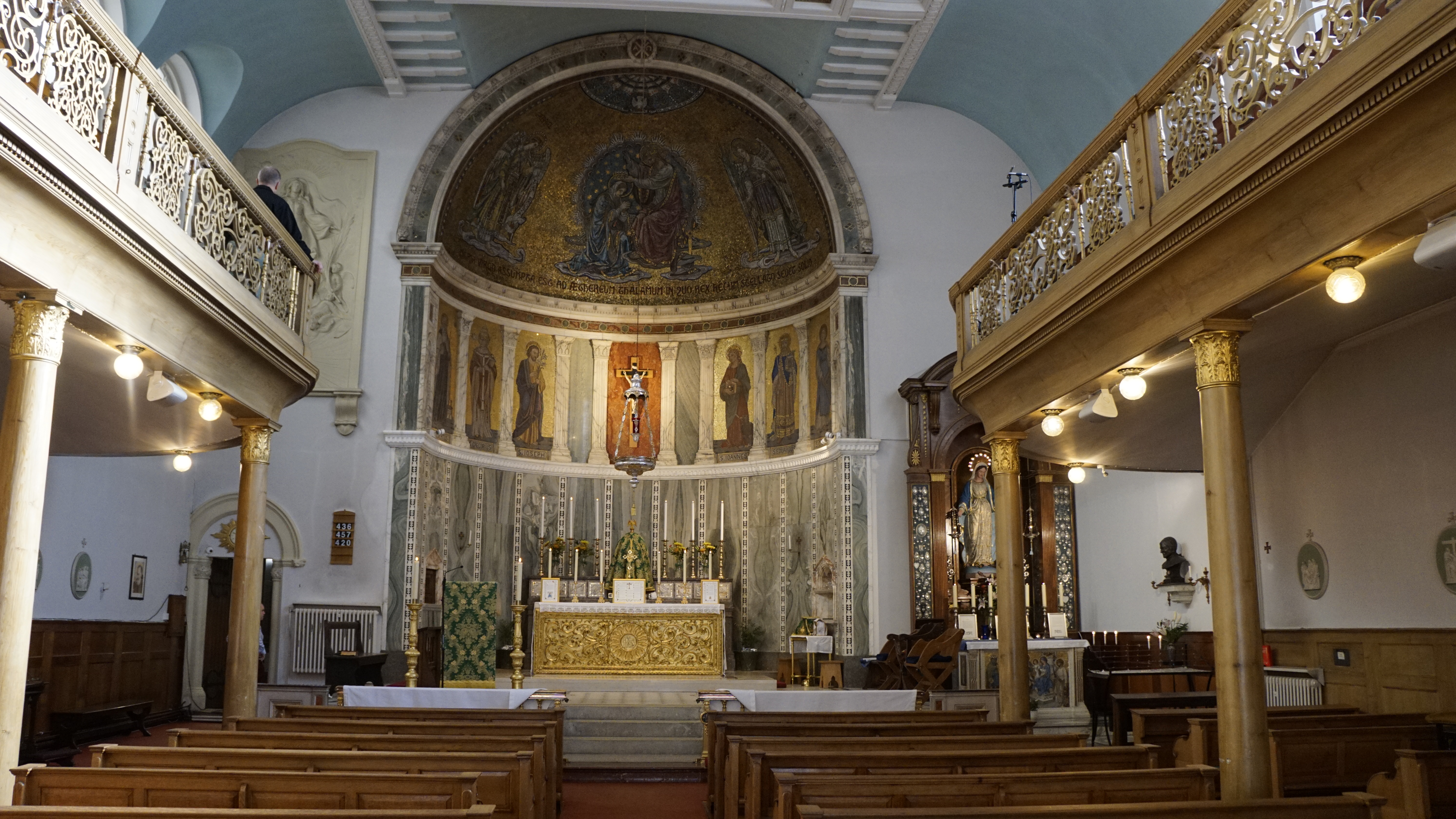
The interior of Church of Our Lady of the Assumption and St Gregory, Soho

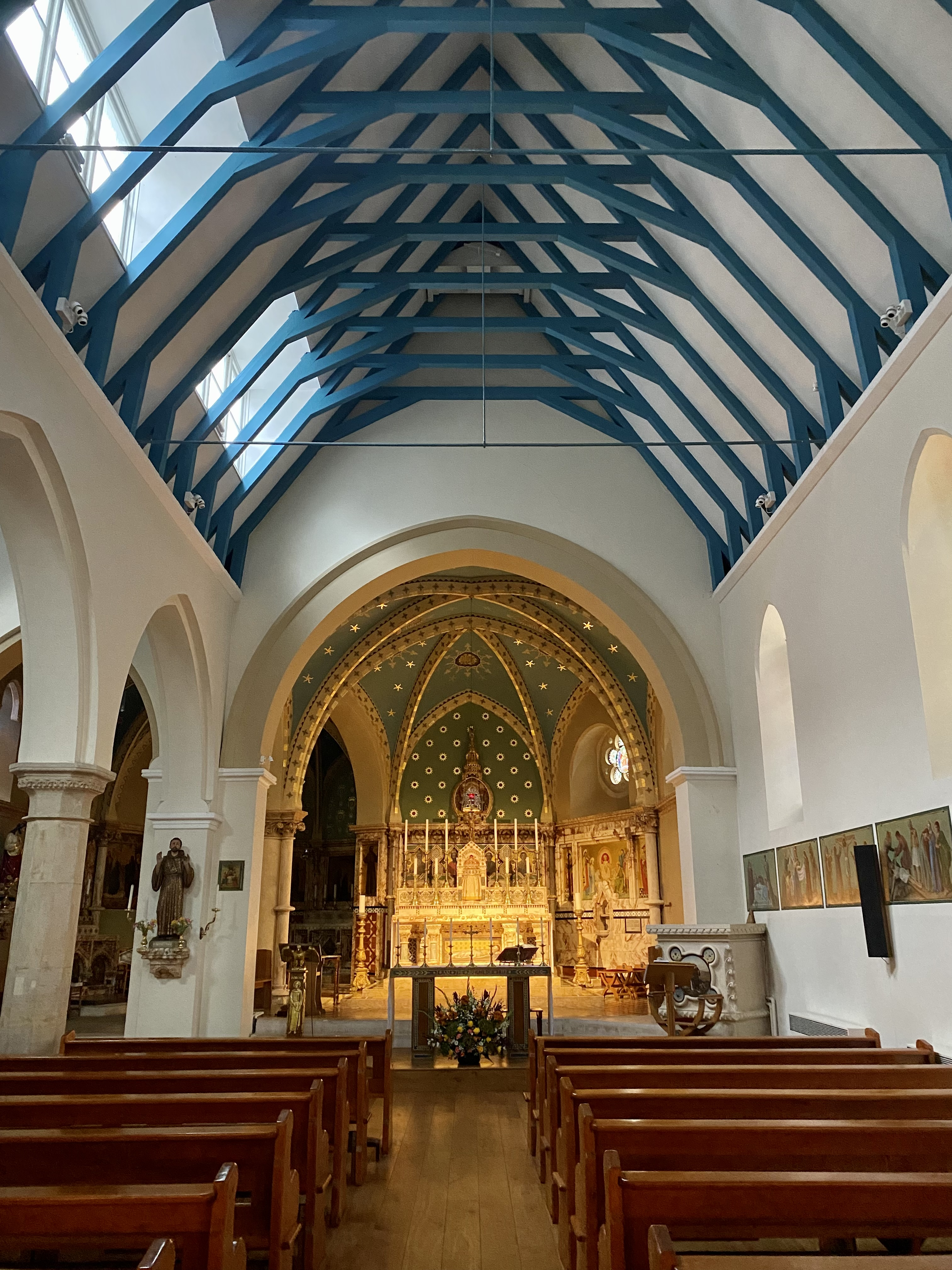
St Francis of Assisi Church, Notting Hill
