= Corpus Christi Church, Brixton =

Coordinates: 51.4559°N 0.1194°W

Corpus Christi Church
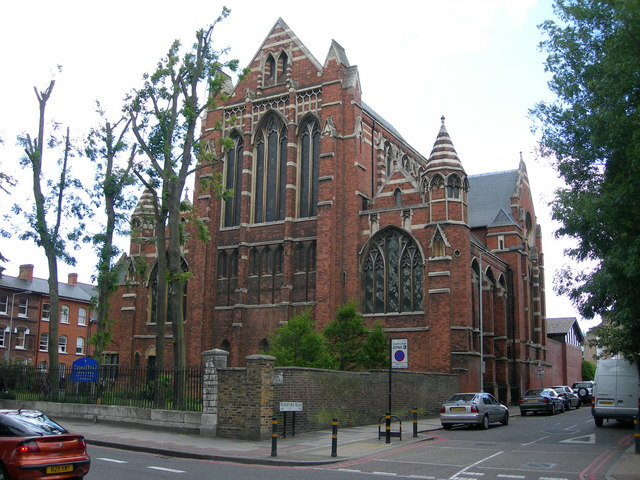
- Front of the church

- Location in the London Borough of Lambeth
- OS grid reference: TQ 30755 74673
- Location: Brixton, London
- Country: England
- Denomination: Roman Catholic
- Website: CorpusChristiBrixton.org

History
- Status: Active
- Founder: Fr Henrik van Doorne
- Dedication: Body of Christ

Architecture
- Functional status: Parish church
- Heritage designation: 27 January 1981
- Designated: Grade II* listed
- Architect: John Francis Bentley
- Groundbreaking: 14 July 1886
- Completed: 12 June 1887

Administration
- Province: Southwark
- Archdiocese: Southwark
- Deanery: Lambeth

Corpus Christi Church is a Roman Catholic Parish church in Brixton, part of the Archdiocese of Southwark within the London Borough of Lambeth. It was previously under the administration of the Society of Jesus whilst remaining part of the Archdiocese. It was founded in 1886, was designed by John Francis Bentley and is a Grade II* listed building.

== History ==
=== Foundation ===
In 1880, a mission to the local Catholics of Brixton was started by Rev. Henrik van Doorne, a priest from Flanders who had lived in England for many years. He bought a house in the area, for £2,610, so that it could become a chapel. In 1885, John Francis Bentley was asked to design a larger church for the area. He recommended that Bethel House, a large on the corner of Brixton Hill and Horsford Road, be bought so that a church can be built on the site. The house was bought for £3,550. On 14 July 1886, the Bishop of Southwark John Butt laid the foundation stone.

=== Construction ===
On 12 June 1887, the church was opened by the bishop. As there was a lack of funds, only the chancel and two chapels and a sacristy was built. In 1904, the transepts of the church were added.

=== Later history ===
In 1902, Corpus Christi Primary School was built at the back of the church, on the land that was previously occupied by Bethel House.

On 23 July 2005, the Jesuits handed back the administration of the church to the Archdiocese of Southwark who continue to serve the Parish.

== Parish ==
As the church was not completed, there is capacity for about 300 people inside, although the building's capacity does seem larger from the outside. It has five Sunday Masses to accommodate the congregation. There is one Mass at 6:00pm on Saturday evening, at 8:30am, 10:00am and at 12 midday on Sunday, and the last one at 6:00pm on Sunday evening. There are weekday Masses at 10:00am from Monday to Saturday and evening Masses on Tuesdays and Fridays at 7pm. HM Prison Brixton is within the Parish boundary, with Priests from the Parish saying Mass for the inmates and staff on Saturdays at 9.15am.

The Parish has a relationship with Corpus Christi School whose mission statement states that 'We are here to educate our children to the highest possible standard in a community which has the Gospel values, traditions and beliefs of the Catholic Faith at the centre of its ethos.'

== See also ==
- Society of Jesus
