= Henry Augustus Rawes =

Henry Augustus Rawes (11 December 1826 – 24 April 1885) was a Catholic hymn writer and preacher.

Born at Easington, near Durham, England, he was educated at Trinity College, Cambridge, and entered the Anglican ministry in 1853. Converted to Catholicism in 1856. One of the original members of the Oblates of Saint Charles. Ordained a priest in 1857. He was Superior of the Oblate congregation from 1880 until his death. Founded the Society of Servants of the Holy Ghost. Translated the treatises of Saint Thomas Aquinas on the Blessed Sacrament and the Lord's Prayer. He wrote several books of devotion and sermons, and many hymns, noted for poetic beauty. He died at Brighton.

In 1874 he was made prefect of studies at St Charles College, and in 1875 was granted a Doctorate in Theology by Pope Pius IX. Fr Rawes was at St Francis of Assisi Church, Notting Hill, until 1880. After being appointed Superior of the Oblates, he moved to St Mary of the Angels. He is buried at St Mary Magdalen Roman Catholic Church, Mortlake.
