= Corca Oíche =

Ancient tribe in Ireland

The Corca Oíche, meaning "the race of Oíche" (also Corco Óchae, Corcu Oche, Corco Che, Corcuighe, Corcoiche), was an ancient tribe, possibly of Pictish origin, existing since pre-Christian times in Ireland. It is possible that they descend from the Cruthin, a people whose territory existed near Lough Neagh in north-east Ireland. As such, some sources claim that they descended from the semi-legendary hero Dubthach Dóeltenga, or more commonly that they are descended from Oíche or Óchae, the daughter of Cronn Badhraoi of the Dál nAraidi, and her son Fergus Foga last king of the Ulaid to rule at Emain Macha.

The tribe has also been associated with the Aiteach Tuatha, a servile, rent-paying race possibly interchangeable with the Déisi. This could be due to their inclusion in the pedigree of the Dál gCais after about 890AD who may themselves descend from the Déisi Tuisceart. The Corca Oíche have also often been linked as a sept of the Uí Fidgenti, potentially being subject to the Ui Chonaill Gabhra. It seems that there is some consensus that whoever was their common ancestor, they most likely originated on the shores of Lough Neagh, as even their own legend of origin depicts.

They may also have had the honor of supplying the court of the King of Cashel with harpers and later entertained the Earls of Desmond until the time of Elizabeth.

The chiefs of the Corca Oíche were noted as Ó Macasa anglicized today as Mackesy, O'Mackesy, O'Mackesey, Mackessy, Macassy, Macasey, Maxey, M'Asey, M'Assie and M'Casey etc.

== History ==
=== Origins, Cruthin & Ulaid ===
The true origin of the Corca Oiche is unknown as is much of their history. Being intertwined with legendary, and semi-legendary stories and characters, often differing greatly, their record of descent has likely been altered over the years for political reasons as was common of many Irish tribes, making it difficult to accurately trace their roots. Yet, from the annals, and legends that do exist, one can still obtain an understanding, mythical or otherwise, as to the potential origin and history of this tribe.

The Corca Oiche are said to have taken their name from Óchae, or Oiche, daughter of Cruind ba Drui. As Cruind ba Drui was a member of the Dál nAraidi, the Corco Oiche are possibly descended from Cruthin, a people often, but arguably, associated as being one and the same as the Picts, who competed with the Dál Fiatach for the kingship of the over-kingdom of Ulaid. Taking the name of a female ancestor could also indicate matrilineality, a common practice among the Picts. Association with the Cruthin therefore places the roots of the tribe in north-east Ireland, which is compatible with other accounts that state their origin as being on the shores of Lough Neagh. Lough Neagh is said to have burst sometime around 65AD and this flooding or subsequent floods may have forced the tribes in the area to migrate. The Corca Oiche were one of these tribes and are believed to have settled in present-day County Monaghan (Corcreeghy near Monaghan, and Corcreaghy near Carickmacross), and eventually as far south as Munster.

However, their apparent relation to Fergus Foga, could also indicate that it may not have been floods which forced the tribe to migrate, but war. Fergus Foga (Foga, Fogha, Foiche, Foche), was the son of Oiche by incest with her brother Fróecher Furtre (Fraechar Foirtriun). Fraechar is said to have forced himself onto his sister out of drunkenness, and as a result is how Magheramesk (Machaire Ráth Meisce: 'The plain of the fort of drunkenness'), County Antrim, was named. Fergus has been associated with Fergus mac Roich a character of the Ulster Cycle, and one source claims that 'Foga' could refer to the word for ‘small spear’, due to legend being that Fergus invented, or at least was the first to use, the small spear in Ireland.

However, perhaps for what he is the most famous, is becoming the last king of the Ulaid to reside at Emain Macha, when he was slain at the battle of Achaidh Leithdeircc, fighting against the three Collas. Afterwards, the Collas burned Emain Macha to the ground effectively annexing a large portion of Ulaid territory later known as Airgialla, and forced the Ulaid back to their easternmost territories. This could also have been cause for a migration.

Due to numerous spellings of Foga, such as 'Foiche', it could also be that it is merely a corruption of Oiche. If so, Fochae (Foicheadh, Fochadh) Beg (Gaelic for 'small') from whom some sources have the Corca Oiche of Munster descending along with his six sons: Fiodhach, Oineann, Cronan, Caiseadha, Baithe and Iinge., could also be associated with Fergus Foga or his mother.

Sometimes, such as in the Kane Ancestral Map of Ireland, the Mackesys are linked to Eber, the eldest son of the mythical king Mil, whom was given the southern half of Ireland after their invasion from Spain supposedly some 2000 years before Christ. This is likely due to the clan's associations with the Ui Fidgenti after settling in the Kingdom of Muhman. However myth aside, if Cruind ba Drui were an ancestor, it would be more likely that they actually descend from the fifth son of Mil, Ir, from whom Rawlinson's genealogy has Cruind descend.

=== Settlement in the Kingdom of Muhman ===
After leaving their traditional home in the north, some of the Corca Oiche arrived in Munster and are said to have been granted Cluain Baird by Ailill Flann Bec, King of Munster around the beginning of the 4th century AD. Cluain Baird may have been a vale somewhere in 'Mag Feimin', a plain situated between Cashel and Clonmel. Further reinforcing the tribe's connection with Ailill Flann Bec, his grandson Conal Corc is also mentioned as having been fostered by a witch, Fidelm (possibly also known as Lair Derg), daughter of Moethaire son of Clithaire of the Corca Oíche.

By the 6th century the Corca Oíche appear to have moved further west and allied themselves, at least for a time, with the Ciarraige Luachra, a tribe that occupied parts of present-day County Kerry. The Ciarriage Luachra led a confederation of west Munster tribes, including the Corca Oíche, Corco Duibne, Múscraige and others, to free themselves from the over-lordship of the king of Éoghanacht Locha Léin and to transfer their allegiance directly to the king of Cashel.

In 546AD the tribe is mentioned in the annals as having been defeated in the battle of Cuilne or Cuilen "through the prayers of" Saint Ita. The exact location of this battle is not known, but their opponents are believed to have been the ancestors of the O'Cuilens/O’Coilens (O'Collins), lords of the Ui Connaill Gabhra, a sept of the Ui Fidgenti, who coincidentally occupied the territory near Killeedy, where Saint Ita had by this time established a monastery. This battle may also mark the point at which the Ui Fidgenti became overlords to the Corca Oiche. St. Ita also became the patron saint of the Corca Oíche.

Relations, however, may have continued to be tense with Ui Fidgenti, for if we are to believe some sources, around the end of the 9th century they are included in the pedigree of the Dál gCais, traditional enemies of the Ui Fidgenti and Eoghanachta. As a result, the Corca Oíche have been associated with the Aiteach Tuatha, or Deisi from whom the Dál gCais are said to descend. By the early 10th century the Dál gCais were beginning to openly challenging the Eoghanachta of Cashel, and association with them could therefore have been political. Saint Molua, born of the Corca Oíche, founded a monastery in Killaloe in the heart of Dalcassian territory, therefore it is likely the two tribes were well aware of one another and possibly on friendly terms.

Prior to the Norman invasion it seems that the territory of Corca Oíche included most of the Norman cantred of Killeedy (Kyllyde hy Connil), equivalent to today's barony of Glenquin and the parish of Ardagh (now in Shanid Barony) in south-west county Limerick. One source suggests that at the time of Saint Ita, they dwelled "on the banks of the Maigue" and refers to their chieftain as carrying the surname O'Macassy. By the 12th century however, it appears their control had shrunk to an area covering parts of Abbeyfeale, Killeedy and Monagea parishes. The Normans William de Burgh, William le Petit, Thomas Fitzmaurice, Geoffrey de Marisco, and the de Barrys are noted as being active in this area during the late 12th and 13th centuries. The name of this territory arises on several occasions during the Norman period through to the 16th century with slightly different spellings, all most likely corruptions of Tuath Corca Oíche.

- 1251: it is referred to as "the half-cantred of Corkoyhe".
- 1298: a document that describes "extents of the lands of Thomas Fitzmaurice" notes the sergeancy of Corkoygh.
- 1452: the "Rental of Connelloe," refers to one of the divisions as Corkoythe.
- 1586: 'Peyton's Survey' refers to a division names 'Gortcoythe', likely further corruption of the former Corca Oiche Tuath.

As the land of the Fitzgerald's was confiscated and redistributed after the Desmond Rebellions, the tuath was likely broken up into the smaller parishes that exist within the area today.

=== Saint Molua ===
St. Molua is also connected with the Corca Oiche, his Gaelic name being Lugaidh Mac h-Ui Oiche. His father was Cartach of the Corca Oiche, and his mother was Sochla who may have been from Osraighe. The Diocese of Limerick note him as being born in Ardagh, considered at the time to be part of the territory held by the tribe.

== Annalistic references ==
- For 546, The battle of Cuilne, in which many of the Corc Oiche were slain through the prayers of St. Ida, of Cluain Creadhail.
- CS552, The battle of Cuilen in which the Corcu Óche of Mumu perished through the prayers of Íta of Cluain Credail.
- AI553, The battle of Cuilen gained by the Corcu Oche through the prayer of Íte.
- For 605, Molua, i.e. Lughaidh Mac hUi Oiche, first abbot of Cluain Fearta Molua, died.
