= Holy Rood Church, Watford =

Holy Rood Church
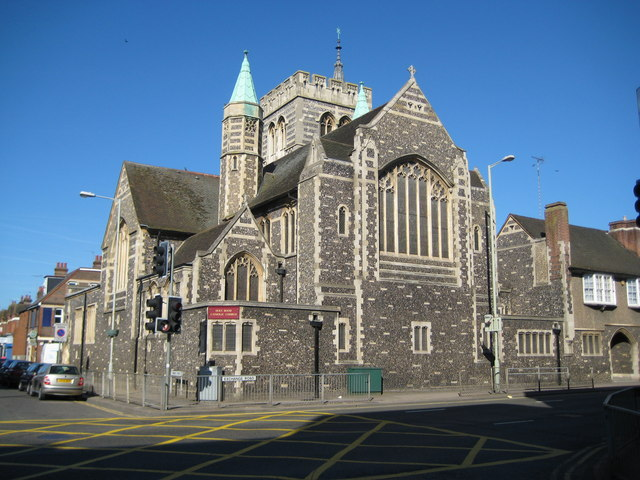
- Holy Rood Church
- 51.6548°N 0.3986°W
- OS grid reference: TQ 10877 96327
- Location: Watford
- Country: England
- Denomination: Roman Catholic
- Website: RCDoW.org.uk/Watford

History
- Status: Active
- Dedication: Feast of the Cross
- Consecrated: 5 July 1900

Architecture
- Functional status: Parish church
- Heritage designation: Grade I listed
- Designated: 12 September 1980
- Architect: John Francis Bentley
- Style: Gothic Revival
- Groundbreaking: 29 August 1889
- Completed: 16 September 1890

Administration
- Province: Westminster
- Archdiocese: Westminster
- Deanery: Watford

Holy Rood Church is a Roman Catholic Parish church in Watford, Hertfordshire. It was built from 1889 to 1890. It is situated on the western corner of Market Street and Exchange Road. It was designed by John Francis Bentley, who also designed Westminster Cathedral. It is a Grade I listed building. The church features in England's Thousand Best Churches by Simon Jenkins who described it as "a true town church".

== History ==
=== Foundation ===
In 1863, Fr George Bampfield came to Watford to say Catholic Mass in rented accommodation in Carey Place. That year, he bought some land and had a hut built there, which became a chapel.

In 1882, with the number of Catholics in the town increasing, a new, larger, site was needed. Fr Bampfield bought a place on Water Lane and had another chapel built there. The chapel was opened in 1883, and was used until the opening of Holy Rood Church.

=== Construction ===
On 29 August 1889, the foundation stone for Holy Rood Church was laid. Construction was largely paid for by the owner of the building firm Holland & Sons, Stephen Taprell Holland. He hired John Francis Bentley to design the church. 16 September 1890, the church was opened. The sanctuary, nave, transepts and south aisle were completed. More features would be added to the church. Work was done to build the tower, Holy Ghost chapel, north aisle and baptistry. On 7 May 1894, the foundation stone for the tower was laid by Cardinal Herbert Vaughan. On 5 July 1900, the completed church was consecrated by Bishop Robert Brindle.

In 1966, repairs were made to the church. Some of the stone needed replacing and the interior needed cleaning. In 1990, further refurbishment occurred. The flint, stonework and roof were repaired and the painting inside the church was cleaned.

== Parish ==
The church has six Sunday Masses: 6:00pm on Saturday evening, and 8:00am, 9:30am, 11:00am, and 5pm on Sunday, as well as a Polish Mass at 2:15pm.

== See also ==
- Roman Catholic Archdiocese of Westminster
