= Mo Lua of Killaloe =

Irish abbot and saint

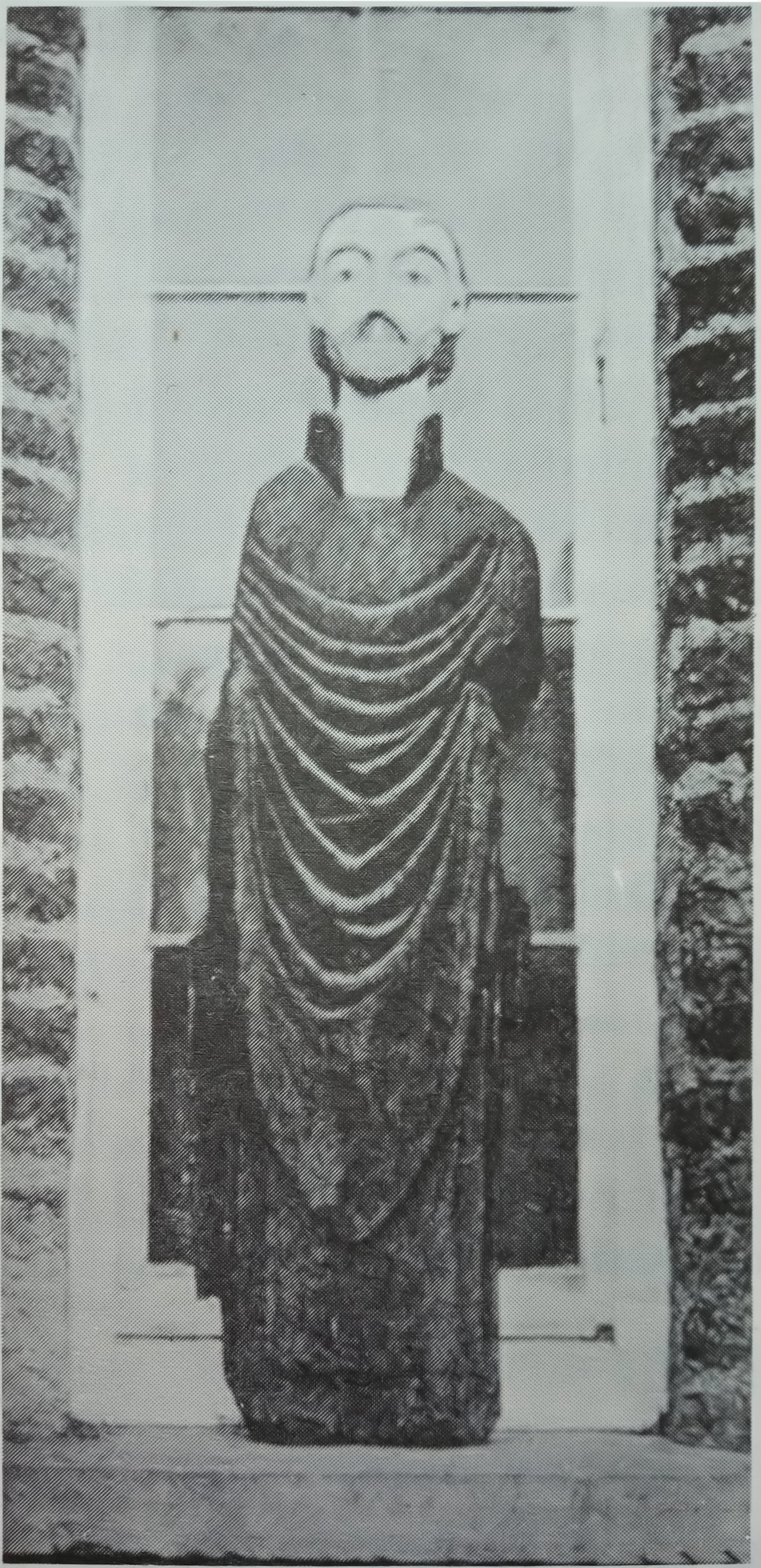
Statue of St Molua from Killaloe

Saint Molua (died c. 609), (also known as Lua, Da Lua), was an Irish saint, who was a Christian abbot in the Early Middle Ages. Saint Molua's feast day is on 4 August. He is venerated in the Catholic Church and Eastern Orthodox Church.

== Life ==
St Molua was an Irish priest of the 6th century who like Columba and Gall trained in the monastery at Bangor, County Down (about twelve miles from Belfast). The saint's real name was originally Lughaidh (pronounced Lua). His father is believed to have been Coche or Carthach of the Corca Oiche, a sept associated with the Ui Fidgenti from the Limerick area. His mother, Sochla was from Ossory.

Little is known about Molua other than he was a monk, a builder and possibly a hermit. Molua was the founder of Killaloe (Irish: Cill-da-Lua), which bears his name Lua. Molua had his oratory on Friar's Island, later replaced by a stone church near the present village of Killaloe. Like most Irish saints he appears to have been very hospitable, believing that in entertaining others he was entertaining Christ. He was kind to animals as well as humans and it was said that when he died all living creatures bewailed him.

== Legacy ==
Molua's principal disciple was Saint Flannan, who succeeded Molua. His monastery in Clonfert-Mulloe in Osraige produced the scholar Laidcenn mac Buith Bannaig.

== Sources ==
- Farmer, David Hugh. The Oxford Dictionary of Saints. Oxford: Oxford University Press, 1992. ISBN 0-19-283069-4
- This article incorporates text from a publication now in the public domain: Herbermann, Charles, ed. (1910). "Diocese of Killaloe". Catholic Encyclopedia. Vol. 8. New York: Robert Appleton Company.
