= St. Molua's Church, Killaloe =

- St. Lua's Oratory
- Teampall Lua
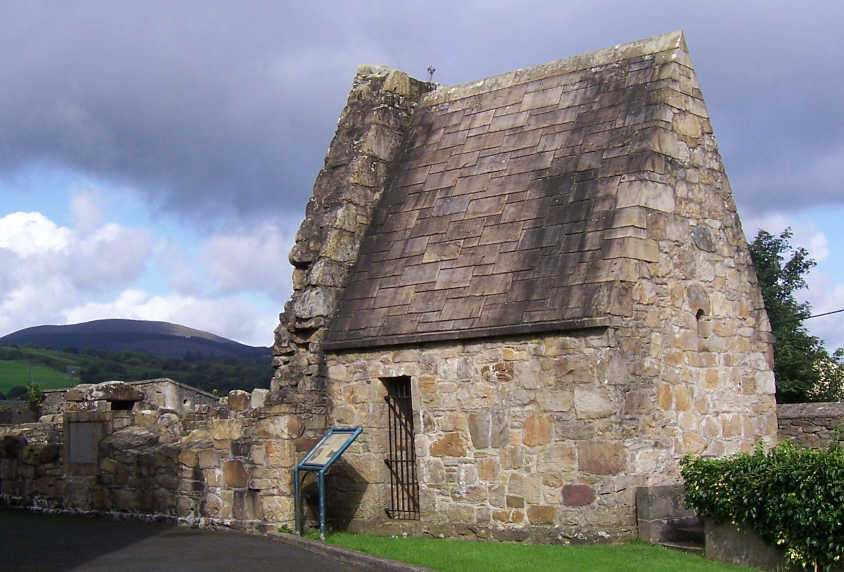

- Location within Ireland
- 52.807063°N 8.444365°W
- Location: The Green, Killaloe, County Clare (formerly Friar's Island)
- Country: Ireland
- Denomination: Pre-Reformation Catholic

History
- Founded: 10th/11th century AD
- Dedication: Mo Lua of Killaloe

Architecture
- Functional status: inactive
- Style: Celtic Christian

Administration
- Diocese: Killaloe
Designations
National monument of Ireland
- Official name: St. Molua's Church
- Reference no.: 279

St. Molua's Church, Killaloe is a medieval church and National Monument in Killaloe, Ireland.

== Location ==
St. Molua's Church was constructed on Friar's Island in the River Shannon, to the south of Killaloe town. In 1929–30 the Shannon hydroelectric scheme raised the water level and submerged Friar's Island, and the church was dismantled and brought north to be constructed on its present site in the grounds of Killaloe Cathedral.

== History ==
A monastery was founded on Friar's Island by Mo Lua in the 6th century. The stone church was built c. 1000, in the era of Brian Boru. The stone roof is one of the first in Ireland; most contemporary stone buildings had wooden roofs.

== Church ==
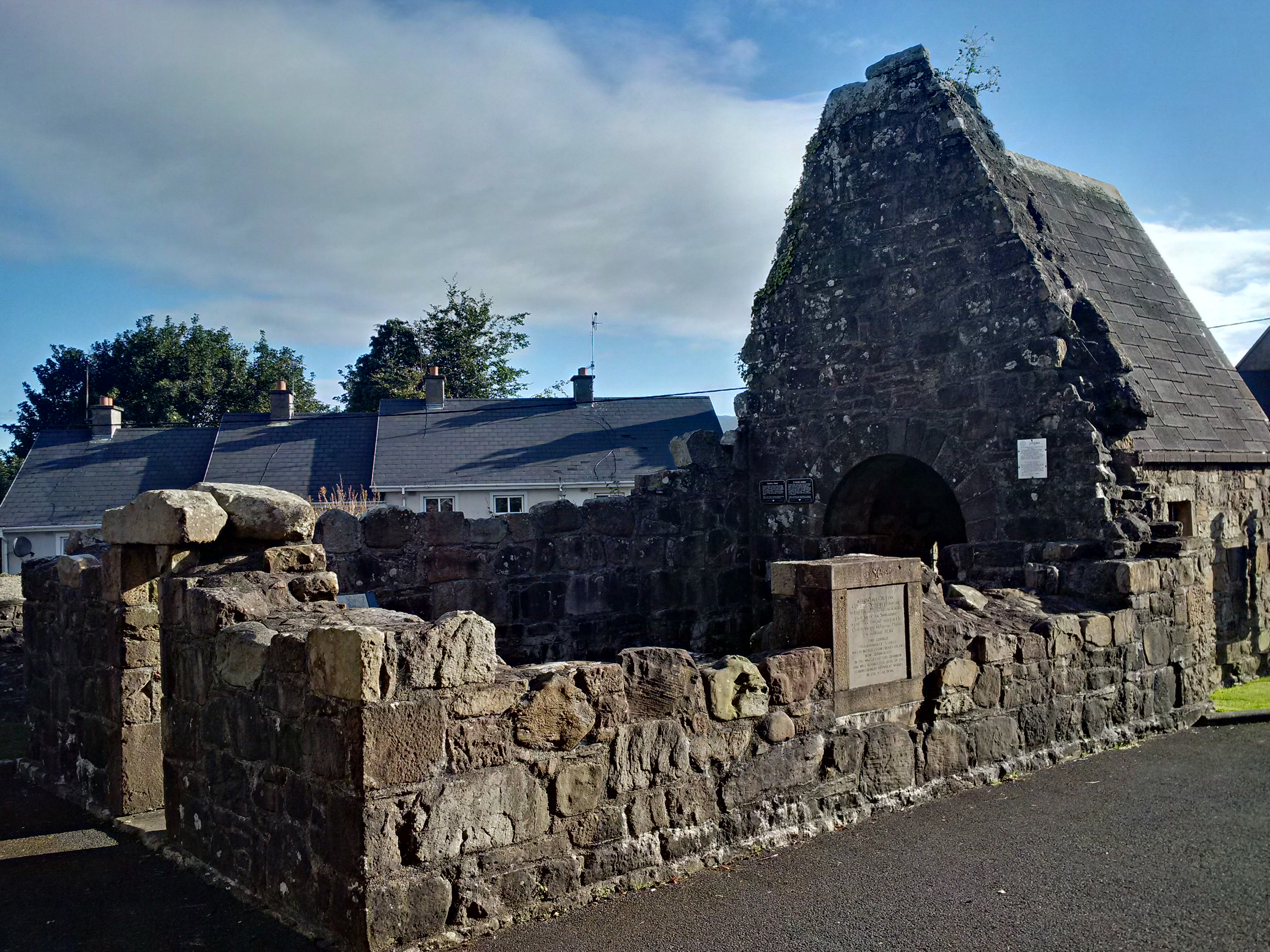
Side view

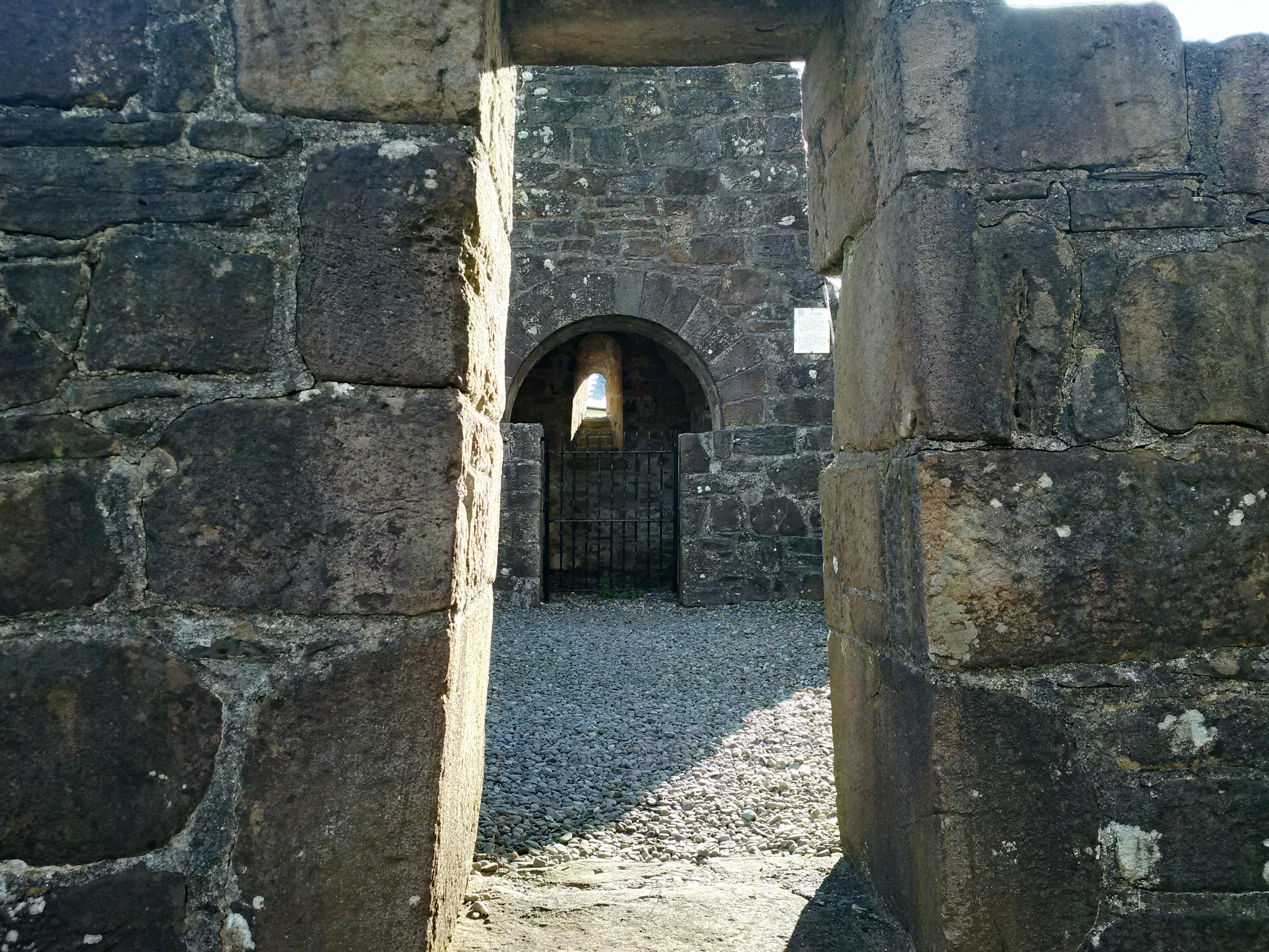
Narrow doorway

The church consists of nave and narrow chancel, built of limestone and mortar. The roof was built without a barrel vault and so collapsed in a storm.
