= The Wicked Girls =

2012 book by Alex Marwood

- First edition
- Author: Alex Marwood (Serena Mackesy)
- Genre: Mystery, Thriller
- Published: 2012
- Publisher: Sphere Books
- Pages: 378
- Awards: Edgar Award for Best Paperback Original (2014)
- ISBN: 978-1-847-44520-9
- Website: The Wicked Girls

The Wicked Girls (ISBN 978-1-847-44520-9) is a book written by Alex Marwood (pseudonym adopted by Serena Mackesy) and published by Sphere Books (an imprint of Little, Brown and Company) on 16 February 2012 which later went on to win the Edgar Award for Best Paperback Original in 2014.
