= William Christian Symons =

English painter

William Christian Symons (28 November 1845 – 1911) was an English decorative designer, and a painter in oil and watercolour.

== Biography ==
Symons was the elder son of William Martyn Symons by his wife Elizabeth White. His father, who came originally from Trerice, St. Columb, Cornwall, carried on a printing business in Bridge Street, Vauxhall, where Christian, his second child, was born on 28 November 1845. There was one other son and two daughters. Symons was educated at a private school in Penzance until he was sent at an early age to the Lambeth Art School, then under the direction of the influential educationalist John Charles Lewis Sparkes.

In 1866 he entered the Royal Academy as a student for a short while, gaining that year a silver medal in the antique school. In 1869 for the first time one of his works (a portrait of his sister) was hung at the Academy Exhibition, to which he was an intermittent contributor until the year of his death, when he was represented by an 'Interior of Downside Abbey'. His easel pictures were also shown at the New English Art Club, the Institute of Painters in Oil, and various other galleries. In 1870 he was received into the Roman Catholic church, and began his long connection with the firm of Lavers, Barraud and Westlake, for whom he designed a number of stained windows.

Symons became a member of the Royal Society of British Artists in 1881, but seceded with James McNeill Whistler in 1888. He only came personally before the public in 1899, when he acted as secretary to the celebrated dinner organised in honour of Whistler on 1 May. In 1899 he began the execution of his commission for certain mosaic decorations at Westminster Cathedral, the work by which he was chiefly known until the posthumous exhibition of his paintings and watercolours at the Goupil Gallery in 1912. He worked at Newlyn in Cornwall for some time, and though never a member of the school associated with that locality he contributed an account of it to The Art Journal in April 1890. In later life he lived almost entirely in Sussex. He died at Udimore, near Rye, where he is buried, on 4 September 1911.

== Personal life ==
He married at Hampstead in 1885 Cecilia, daughter of J. L. Davenport of Wildemlow, Derby. He left nine children. two daughters and seven sons, all of whom survived him. The eldest, Mark Lancelot (1887–1935), a painter of portraits and subject pieces, exhibited occasionally at the New English Art Club. His second son, Philip, became Dom Thomas Symons ARCO (1887–1975) of Downside Abbey and later of Worth Abbey, where he is buried.

== Works ==
Symons was better known to a limited circle as a decorator and designer than as a painter. His varied talents, though recognised by fellow artists, with all of whom he was personally very popular, were insufficiently appreciated by the public during his lifetime. A retiring, over-modest nature accounted in some measure for his ill-success.

His mosaic work at Westminster Cathedral consists of the chapel of the Holy Souls, the altar-piece of 'St. Edmund blessing London' in the crypt, and the panel of the 'Veronica' in the chapel of the Sacred Heart, and that of 'The Blessed Joan of Arc' in the north transept. The unpleasant technique (opus sectile) employed for some of these, in accordance with Bentley's instructions, has hardly done justice to their fine design and courageous colour. They have been criticised for an over-emphasis of pictorial illusion, to which the medium of mosaic is unsuited. The defect was probably due to misapprehension, common among all modern ecclesiastical authorities, with regard to the functions of mosaic decoration.

Another characteristic example of the artist's powers may be seen in the spandrels at St. Botolph's, Bishopsgate. One of his best oil pictures, 'The Convalescent Connoisseur', is in the Dublin Municipal Gallery of Modern Art. In the Mappin Art Gallery at Sheffield are 'In Hora Mortis' and 'Home from the War', while 'The Squaw' belongs to the Contemporary Art Society. The British Museum, the Manchester City Art Gallery, and the Brighton Art Gallery possess characteristic examples of his watercolours. His flower pieces are of particular excellence. Mr. Le Brasseur of Hampstead possesses the largest collection of his paintings. Symons was obviously influenced by Sargent and Brabazon, but preserved his own individuality and did not allow his art to be affected by his friendship for Whistler.
