= O'Heerin =

Irish surname

O'Heerin (Irish: Ó hUidhrín) is an Irish surname meaning "grandson or descendant of Uidhrin" ("dark grey"). The O'Heerin clan of Leinster originates in the ancient Kingdom of Uí Failghe corresponding to the modern County Offaly, the territory given by the second-century king Cathair Mór to his eldest son Ros Failgeach.

Uidhrin O'Maelmuire was an 11th-century Ui Neill chief ruling Cenél Fearadhaigh, now the barony of Clogher in County Tyrone in Northern Ireland. His son and grandson also ruled as chiefs, before Mac Cathmhaoil in the 12th century. It is unknown if these chiefs were related to the Leinster clan. The name next appears with the historian Giolla na Naomh Ó hUidhrín (O'Heerin) who died in 1420. His addition to Seán Mór Ó Dubhagáin (O'Dugan)'s "Triallam timcheall na Fodla" commences with "Tuilleadh feasa ar Éirinn óigh" (More Knowledge on Sacred Ireland).

== See also ==
- Heron (surname), sometimes anglicised from Ó hUidhrín
- McGivern, anglicised from Mac Uidhrín "son of Uidhrín")
