= O'Collins =

Surname

O'Collins is a common anglicized surname of two ancient families of Irish origin: O'Cuilleain and O'Coilean.

O'Collins.

== Origin of O'Cuilleain ==
O'Cuilleain or Cuilliaéan is an extremely ancient Irish name from Gaelic cuileann and primitive Gaelic cuilieann meaning Holly. In pre-Christian Celtic culture and history, the Holly Tree was regarded as sacred on account of its alleged mystic and herbal properties.

As testimony to the ancient age of this family, the origin of the word holly comes from the 11th Century Old High German hulis and Old English holegn both meaning Holly. The word hulis originates from an even older pre-Christian proto-Germanic word khuli a shortened derivation of the ancient Gaelic cuilieann both meaning holly.

The English word “holly” itself pre-dates the word holy which appeared around the 13th Century with the Old English word hālig derived from hāl meaning health, happiness and wholeness.

It is possible the word Celt is also derived from Holly as a description of these, the earliest leaders of Ireland. The first literary reference to the Celtic people, as keltoi is by the Greek historian Hecataeus in 517 BC. He locates the Keltoi tribe in Rhenania (West/Southwest Germany). The similar proto-Germanic word 'Khuli was in use at the time in the area through the proto-Germanic language, a shortened derivation of the ancient Gaelic cuilieann both meaning Holly.

Also sometimes written as Cualann, Cuilonn, Cullen, Culaan, Cuilinn and Cuillin, the O'Cuilleain originate from the Wicklow Hills (in Gaelic “Cill Mhantáin”) and were originally known as the Feara Cualann which probably more accurately translates as the Holly Men, than the Wicklow Men.

While the exact evidence of their migration south to West Cork is not clear, the event precedes the arrival of the O'Coilean (O'Collins) to the same area in the 12th Century by a significant period of centuries.

== Origin of O'Coilean ==
Ó Coileáin is an ancient Irish name from Gaelic coileain meaning "young warrior" or “hound”. In ancient Irish history, this family had a famous and fearless reputation for their skill at battle and are the original source of the name Collins, now so common throughout England and the world.

Due to pressures of defeat against the Anglo-Norman invaders, O'Coilean were gradually driven south from County Limerick to settle in the same approximate area as the O'Cuilleain in West Cork and Cork around the end of the 12th Century. As a result, the two families have been virtually impossible to geographically distinguish for the past eight hundred years.

The O'Donovans, also originally from Co. Limerick, and from the same ancient kingdom, known as Uí Fidgenti, made the journey to Co. Cork under similar circumstances, and so are closely related to these O'Collins.

== People ==
- Con Collins
- Michael Collins (Irish leader)

== See also ==
- Mountcollins
- Collins (surname)
