= William Mackesy =

Officer of the British and Indian Armies

Lieutenant General William Henry Mackesy (1 May 1837 – 6 March 1914) was an Irish-born officer of the British, Bengal, and Indian armies who saw active duty in the Crimean War and the Indian Mutiny of 1857.

== Early life ==
Mackesy was born on 1 May 1837, a son of John Mackesy MD of Waterford, Ireland. He was educated privately and then for two years at the Royal Military College, Sandhurst, as a gentleman cadet, graduating in 1854.

His uncle Thomas Mackesy (1790–1869), a surgeon who served with the British Army, was Mayor of Waterford and President of the Royal College of Surgeons in Ireland.

== Career ==
From Sandhurst, in August 1854 Mackesy was commissioned as an Ensign into the 79th Cameron Highlanders, without purchase. He served in the Crimean War, taking part in the assault on Sebastopol in 1855. After that, he was posted to Bengal, one of the Presidencies and provinces of British India, and saw action in the Indian Mutiny. He was at the capture of Lucknow in 1858 and was then posted as an Assistant Field Engineer in the Crimea and in Oudh, from 1858 to 1859; in 1862 he was admitted as an Associate of the Institution of Civil Engineers; in 1866 he was a Captain and transferred from the 79th Foot to the Bengal Staff Corps. Mackesy later served the Public Works and Military Works Departments as an engineer. In January 1870, he was promoted to brevet Major, in August 1874 (marking twenty years of service) to substantive Major, and in October 1877 to Lieutenant-Colonel. In March 1879, on his return to India from a home leave, Mackesy transferred to the Military Department as a temporary Colonel and in 1882 was back in the Bengal Staff Corps as a full Colonel. In July 1883, he took command of the 24th Punjab Infantry. In September 1883, he also took command of the Mooltan Brigade to cover for the leave of Brigadier-General William Gordon. In June 1890, he was granted a distinguished service pension of £100 a year.

After promotion to temporary Lieutenant General in 1890, Mackesy was made a substantive Major General on 10 December 1892. In 1897, he retired as a Lieutenant General onto the Unemployed Supernumerary List of the Indian Army.

== Personal life ==
On 1 September 1870, at St Mary's, Chelsea, while a Major in the Bengal Staff Corps on home leave, Mackesy married Teresa Mary Creagh, a daughter of Pierse Creagh, late of Mountjoy Square, Dublin, and Bryan's Castle, County Clare. A daughter was born at Lahore on 13 January 1872. They also had three sons.

Mackesy retired to the parish of St George Hanover Square, Westminster, in 1897. In 1898, his daughter Violet Mary was married in Kensington.

At the time of the 1911 United Kingdom census, Mackesy and his wife were living at 65, Albert Hall Mansions, Knightsbridge, with two servants, a cook and a parlourmaid. They stated their places of birth as Waterford and Dublin respectively, and Mrs Mackesy was aged sixty.

Mackesy died at Albert Hall Mansions on 6 March 1914, leaving an estate valued at £1,836, equivalent to £183,166 in 2025.

The Mackesys' son Pierse Joseph Mackesy (1883–1956) became a British Army major-general. His son Piers Mackesy (1924–2014) was a military historian.
