= St Mary's, Cadogan Street =

St Mary's Church
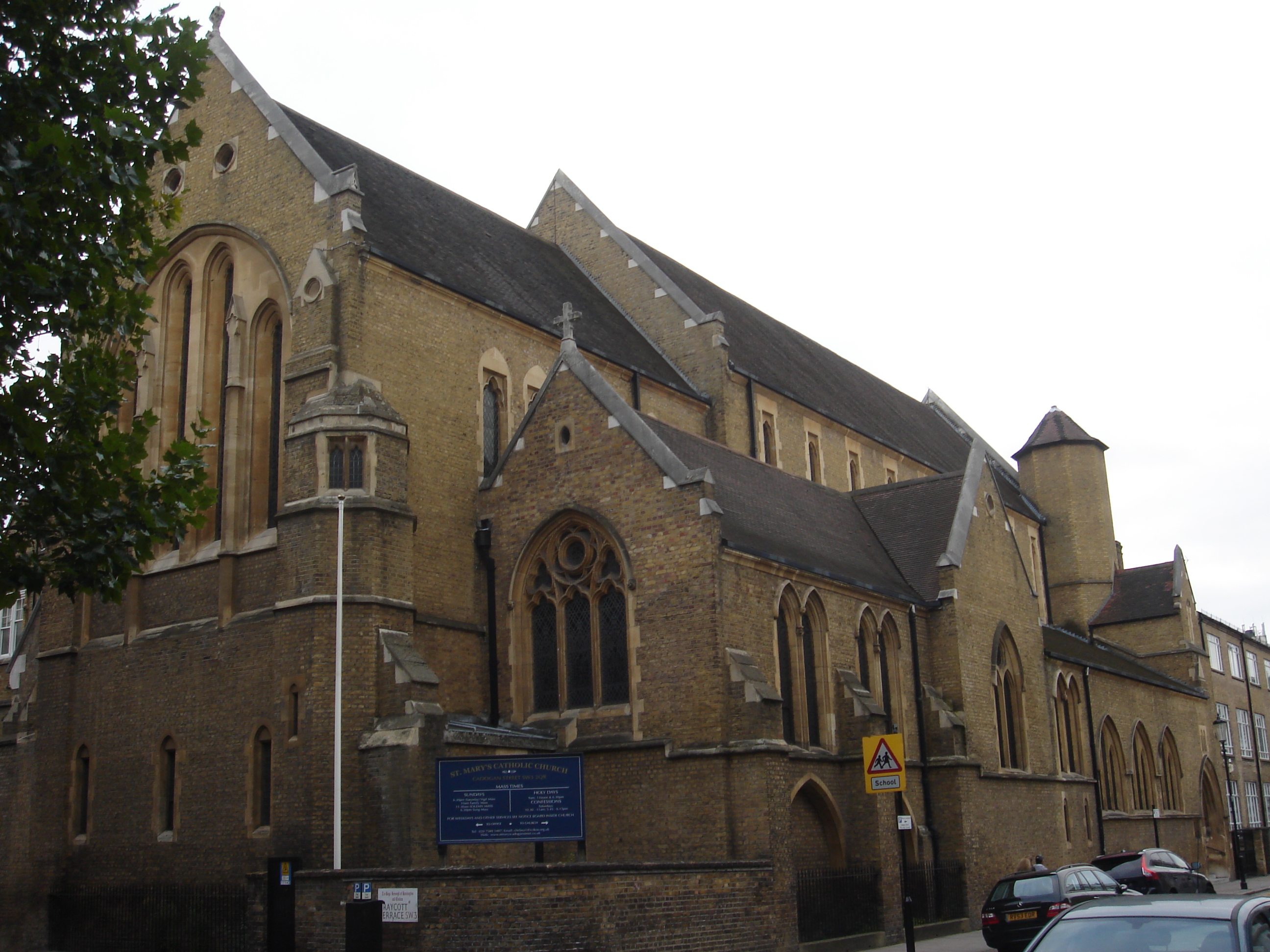
- St Mary's Church in 2013
- St Mary's Church
- 51.4932°N 0.1616°W
- Location: London, SW3
- Country: England
- Denomination: Roman Catholic
- Website: stmaryscadoganstreet.co.uk

History
- Status: Active
- Founded: 1794 (parish)
- Dedication: Saint Mary

Architecture
- Functional status: Parish church
- Heritage designation: Grade II*
- Architect: John Francis Bentley
- Years built: 1877–1879

Administration
- Province: Westminster
- Archdiocese: Westminster

Clergy
- Archbishop: Vincent Nichols
- Priest: Fr Shaun Middleton

St Mary's, Cadogan Street, is a Grade II* listed Roman Catholic church in Cadogan Street, Chelsea, London. It was built between 1877 and 1879 by John Francis Bentley, most notable as architect of Westminster Cathedral, and is one of the oldest Roman Catholic parishes in central London.

== History and architecture ==
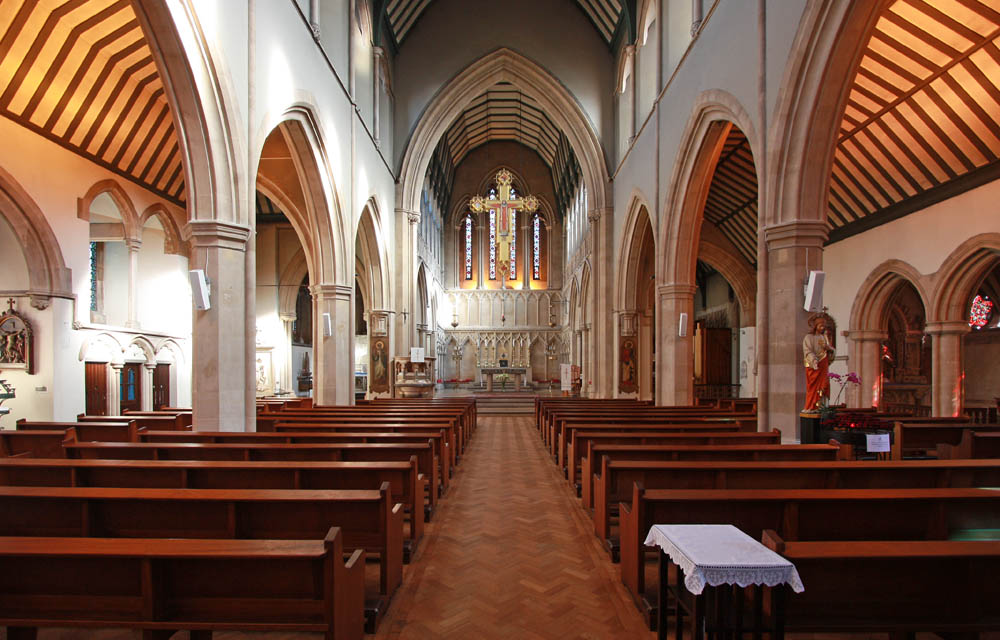
A view of the nave and high altar from the back of the church

There has existed a Catholic place of worship on the site of St Mary's since 1812, when the first Catholic chapel in Chelsea, and one of the first in the country since the Reformation, was erected. It was established by Abbé Jean Voyaux de Franous, who arrived in London in 1793 having previously been Royal Almoner to Louis XVI. De Franous was responsible for the spiritual welfare of the veteran soldiers at Chelsea College (now the Royal Hospital Chelsea), as well as all those at the Chelsea and Knightsbridge Barracks. In 1811, de Franous leased land in Cadogan Street from Lady Charlotte Denys, to build a chapel. The chapel was intended to be used primarily by the soldiers and veterans of the Royal Hospital, though funding for its construction was gathered from across France and the United Kingdom.

After the death of de Franous, parishioners proposed a comprehensive scheme to build a church, a convent, schools, almshouses and a cemetery that would in some ways resemble the medieval conception of parish life. These were mostly built between 1845 and 1855, though the foundation stone of the present church was not laid until 1877. Designed by John Francis Bentley (1839–1902), the church was opened and blessed by Cardinal Manning in May 1879.
