= Piers Mackesy =

British military historian (1924-2014)

- Born: 15 September 1924; Cults, Aberdeenshire, Scotland
- Died: 30 June 2014 (aged 89)
- Education: Wellington College, Berkshire; Christ Church, Oxford; Oriel College, Oxford
- Occupation: Military historian
- Children: Serena Mackesy
- Parents: Pierse Joseph Mackesy (father); Leonora Cook (mother)
- Relatives: Charlie Mackesy (nephew)
- Military career
- Allegiance: United Kingdom
- Branch: British Army
- Service years: 1944-1947
- Unit: Royal Scots Greys
- Conflicts: World War II

Piers Gerald Mackesy FBA (15 September 1924 – 30 June 2014) was a British military historian who taught at the University of Oxford in Oxford.

== Early life and education ==
Piers Mackesy was born in Cults, near Aberdeen in Scotland, the son of Major-General Pierse Joseph Mackesy and Leonora Cook, while his Irish grandfather, William Mackesy, was a Lieutenant General.

Growing up in an army family, Mackesy followed his father's assignments, living on a number of army camps, including Quetta, Pakistan; Chatham, England, and Borden to the south-west of Guildford. Mackesy was educated at Wellington College in Crowthorne and was commissioned into the Royal Scots Greys in 1944, serving until 1947. Then he became a scholar of Christ Church, Oxford, obtaining his bachelor's degree in 1950. As a graduate student, Mackesy studied for a D.Phil. degree at Oriel College, Oxford, where he wrote his thesis on British Strategy in the Mediterranean, 1803–1810.

Mackesy's daughter is the novelist Serena Mackesy.

== Academic career ==
After completing his doctorate, Mackesy was appointed Harkness Fellow at Harvard University, and a year later he was appointed a tutor in modern history and Fellow of Pembroke College, Oxford in 1954, remaining there until he retired in 1988. While at Pembroke, he became senior tutor and vicegerent of the College. For many years, he taught the special subject in military history at Oxford with Professor N. H. Gibbs. The course of study involved using the War of the Second Coalition as a case study for examining the theories of Carl von Clausewitz, a Prussian general. He was an Emeritus Fellow of Pembroke College from 1988 until his death in 2014.

Mackesy was visiting fellow, Institute for Advanced Study in Princeton (1961–62); visiting professor, California Institute of Technology (1966); Bland-Lee Lecturer at Clark University. He taught at the Naval War College in Newport, Rhode Island; the United States Military Academy in West Point, New York; and Northeastern University in Boston. He was the Lees Knowles Lecturer at Cambridge University in 1972, and served as a member of Council, Institute of Early American History and Culture in Williamsburg, Virginia, 1970–73.

In 1978 the University of Oxford awarded Mackesy the degree of D.Litt. In 1988 he was elected a Fellow of the British Academy.

== Publications ==
- The War in the Mediterranean, 1803–1810 (1957)
- The War for America, 1775–1783 (1964, 1992)
- Statesmen at War: The Strategy of Overthrow, 1798–1799 (1974) ISBN 9780582120778
- Could the British have Won the War of Independence?: Bland-Lee lecture, September 1975 (1976)
- The Coward of Minden: the Affair of Lord George Sackville (1979) ISBN 9780713908510
- War without Victory: The Downfall of Pitt, 1799–1802 (1984) ISBN 9780198224952
- British Victory in Egypt, 1801: the End of Napoleon's Conquest (1995); ISBN 9780755643011; awarded the Templer Medal

Contributor to:

- Michael Howard, ed, Wellingtonian Studies (1959)
- David L. Jacobson, ed., Essays on the American Revolution (1970)
- William M. Fowler, Jr. and Wallace Coyle, eds., The American Revolution: Changing Perspectives (1979) ISBN 9780930350031
- John B. Hattendorf and Malcolm H. Murfett, eds, The Limitations of Military Power: Essays Presented to Professor Norman Gibbs on His Eightieth Birthday (1990) ISBN 9780312045142

== Sources ==
- "Fellows in the 1940s and 1950s" — Pembroke College, Oxford
- "Liberty Scholars"
- "The Templer Medal Book Competition"
