= St Mary of the Angels, Bayswater =

St Mary of the Angels
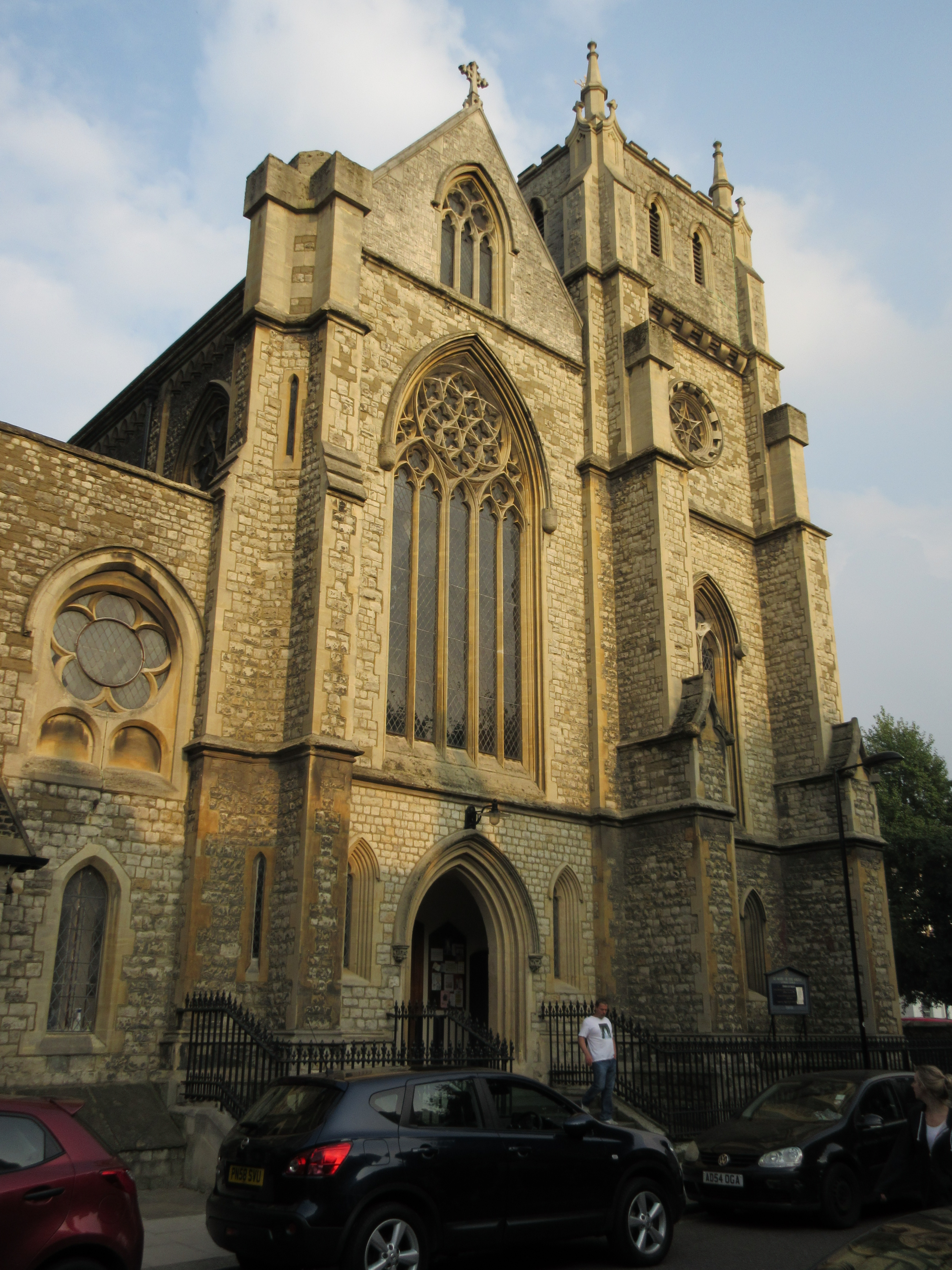
- St Mary of the Angels
- 51.51574°N 0.1974°W
- OS grid reference: TQ 25173 81194
- Location: Moorhouse Road, Bayswater, London
- Country: England
- Denomination: Roman Catholic
- Website: humilitas.org

Architecture
- Architect: John Francis Bentley

Administration
- Diocese: Roman Catholic Diocese of Westminster

Clergy
- Priest: Keith Barltrop

St Mary of the Angels is a Roman Catholic church on Moorhouse Road in Bayswater, London, England, within the City of Westminster. The parish it serves is partly in the City of Westminster and partly in the Royal Borough of Kensington and Chelsea.

== History ==
A mission was started in Bayswater in 1849. As the labourers building Paddington Station were mainly Irish Catholic, Cardinal Wiseman saw a need for a Catholic church in the area, and asked Provost Henry Manning to undertake the task.

The construction of the original building began in 1851 to original designs by Thomas Meyer in the Puginian Gothic style. Meyers also built, around the same time, St Joseph's Church in Avon Dassett, Warwickshire. Work was temporarily interrupted due to lack of funds, but was completed in 1857 by Manning's kinsman Henry Clutton, with additions by John Francis Bentley. Meyer also designed an earlier school chapel, also on Moorhouse Road. The church was initially dedicated to St Helen, in honour of Helen Hargrave, a benefactor.

A stained glass window in the north aisle depicting Vincent de Paul, the Madonna and John the Evangelist was executed by James Powell & Sons, based on a sketch by John Hungerford Pollen for the Chapel of Studley Royal and adapted as a memorial to Pollen. The window depicting the Coronation of the Virgin is by Hardman & Co.

It was listed as Grade II* by English Heritage in 1970.

== Oblates of St Charles ==
The Congregation of Oblates of St Charles were founded by Wiseman. The religious orders established in his diocese did not seem to him to answer adequately to modern conditions, nor were they wholly at his disposal. The priests of the Oratory, gathered round Faber and Newman, showed him, however, what may be looked for from a diocesan society. Manning was at that time at the Cardinal's disposal, and it was to him that the duty was entrusted of founding the new society, and of drawing up its rules. Manning took the Oblates of Milan as his pattern, and gave his priests the title of "Oblates of St Charles". The rules which he prescribed for them were practically those drawn up by Charles Borromeo for his disciples adapted to English conditions, and were approved by the Holy See in 1857 and in 1877.

Wiseman installed his Oblates, with their superior and founder, at the church of St Mary of the Angels, Bayswater, on Whit Monday 1877. Before long they had created other missions or religious centres in the diocese of Westminster. Nor did the opposition of Errington, Wiseman's coadjutor, and of the Westminster chapter, hinder the advance of the society, though the Cardinal found himself, under the necessity of withdrawing them from his seminary at St Edmund's, where he had placed them. Under Manning's direction, the Oblates devoted themselves to various apostolic labours in London, and established several parishes in the two dioceses of Westminster and Southwark.

Manning governed the Bayswater community from 1857 to 1868. He held that the mission of the Oblates was to revive the English secular clergy by taking part in its life and in its labours, and thus setting them an example. In 1882, the Oblates opened Our Lady of the Holy Souls Church on Bosworth Road in Kensal New Town.

Ronald Knox preached a sermon on Charles Borromeo at St Mary's. The Oblates continued their ministry at St Mary's until the mid-1970s.
