= Pierse Mackesy =

Major General of the British Army

Major-General Pierse Mackesy CB DSO MC
- Born: 5 April 1883; Dublin, Ireland
- Died: 8 June 1956 (aged 73); Osborne House, East Cowes, Isle of Wight (formerly of Southwold, Suffolk)
- Relatives: William Mackesy (father)
- Military career
- Allegiance: United Kingdom
- Branch: British Army
- Service years: 1902–1940
- Rank: Major-General
- Nickname: "Pat"
- Service number: 21757
- Unit: Royal Engineers
- Commands: 49th (West Riding) Infantry Division (1938–40); 3rd Infantry Brigade (1935–38); Depot Battalion Royal Engineers (1930–32)
- Conflicts: First World War; Russian Civil War; Second World War
- Awards: Companion of the Order of the Bath; Distinguished Service Order; Military Cross; Mentioned in Despatches (2)

Major-General Pierse Joseph Mackesy, CB, DSO, MC (5 April 1883 – 8 June 1956) was a British Army officer who, early in the Second World War, led the attempt to recapture Narvik in April–May 1940 in the ill-fated Norwegian campaign.

== Early life ==
Mackesy was one of the three sons of Lieutenant General William Henry Mackesy and was educated at St Paul's School, then in Hammersmith, and then for two years at the Royal Military Academy, Woolwich, which trained men to be officers of the Royal Artillery and the Royal Engineers. He was commissioned into the Royal Engineers as a second lieutenant on 23 August 1902.

== Military career ==
Mackesy became a survey specialist in the Gold Coast (Ghana) in 1911. The first eighteen months of his First World War service were in West Africa. Thereafter he served in France, where he was awarded the Military Cross. As a captain he was Officer Commanding 518th (1/4th London) Field Company, Royal Engineers, from 1 June 1917 to 22 March 1918.

A staff officer with the North Russia Relief Force in 1919, he was awarded the Distinguished Service Order before joining the Military Mission to South Russia in 1920. A student at the Staff College, Camberley in Camberley, England between 1920 and 1921, he married in 1923 and after a variety of postings at home and abroad—including service at the Staff College, Quetta in Quetta, Pakistan as a General Staff Officer Grade 2 (GSO2)—he was appointed to command the 3rd Infantry Brigade at Bordon, southwest of Guildford, England in 1935. In Palestine between 1935 and 1938, he was promoted to major general in 1937 and relinquished command of the brigade on 12 January 1938 and was placed on half-pay. He was appointed a Companion of the Order of the Bath in 1938. He became General Officer Commanding 49th (West Riding) Division in May 1938. He was also an adviser to the New Zealand government on defence. He returned to England at the start of the Second World War and re-assumed command of his division.

Destined to be sent to France to form part of Lieutenant General Ronald Forbes Adam's III Corps of the British Expeditionary Force, the 49th Division was instead held at home in readiness for operations in Scandinavia. As the Russo-Finnish 'winter war' only interested the British government to the extent which it offered a pretext for interrupting the traffic of iron ore to Germany, 'Pat' Mackesy, with his experience of war in arctic conditions, was an obvious choice as commander of an expeditionary force. In the event British intervention in Scandinavia happened not, as was planned, to forestall German action but as a response to the German invasion of Norway. Mackesy, with one infantry brigade constituting 'Avonforce', was sent to invest the port of Narvik, Norway.

Enraging Prime Minister Winston Churchill by refusing to commit his troops to "the sheer bloody murder" of an "arctic Gallipoli", Mackesy was recalled home and amidst Churchillian mutterings about his "feebleness and downright cowardice", was spared a court-martial but he never held command again.

== Later life ==
Retired from the army in November 1940, Mackesy served for a while on various War Office committees and was an occasional contributor to the Daily Telegraph. Considered a drunkard and a security risk by General Sir Alan Brooke, his mail was regularly intercepted. A Southwold borough councillor from 1946, he was later mayor of the town on two separate occasions, as well as being a member of the East Suffolk County Council.

His son, Piers Mackesy, was a noted military historian.

== Bibliography ==
- T.K. Derry, History of the Second World War: The Campaign in Norway, London, HM Stationery Office, 1952.
- Alan H. Maude (ed.), The History of the 47th (London) Division 1914–1919, London: Amalgamated Press, 1922/Uckfield: Naval & Military Press, 2002, ISBN 1-84342-205-0.
- Smart, Nick (2005). Biographical Dictionary of British Generals of the Second World War. Barnesley: Pen & Sword. ISBN 1844150496.

Military offices
Preceded by George Kelly	GOC 49th (West Riding) Infantry Division; 1938–1940	Succeeded by Henry Curtis
