= Geology of Somerset =

Geology of English county

Somerset

Somerset is a rural county in the southwest of England, covering 4,171 square kilometres (1,610 sq mi). It is bounded on the north-west by the Bristol Channel, on the north by Bristol and Gloucestershire, on the north-east by Wiltshire, on the south-east by Dorset, and on the south west and west by Devon. It has broad central plains with several ranges of low hills. The landscape divides into four main geological sections from the Silurian through the Devonian and Carboniferous to the Permian which influence the landscape, together with water-related features.

The low-lying areas of the North Somerset Levels and Somerset Levels have been subject to thousands of years of flooding and man's attempts to control the flow of water. In the north of the county the Limestone of the Mendip Hills dominates the landscape, while in the south the Blackdown and Quantock Hills rise out of the levels. The highest areas are on Exmoor. The wide variety of landscapes has led to several areas being designated as Sites of Special Scientific Interest for geological reasons, and support a range of flora and fauna as can be seen from the List of Sites of Special Scientific Interest in Somerset.

== Rock ages ==
The oldest rocks are of Silurian age (443–419 million years ago), the most southerly known outcrop of rocks of this age in Britain. They make up a sequence of lavas, tuffs (volcanic ash), shales and mudstones in a narrow outcrop to the northeast of Shepton Mallet, in the eastern Mendip Hills.

Rocks from the Devonian (419–359 million years ago) are found across much of Exmoor, the Quantocks (including Hangman Sandstone and Cockercombe tuff), and in the cores of the folded masses of the Mendip Hills.

Carboniferous Period (359–299 million years ago) rocks are represented by the Carboniferous Limestone that forms the Mendip Hills, rising abruptly out of the flat landscape of the Somerset Levels and Moors. The limestones are very fossiliferous, and contain evidence of the abundant marine life that existed at the time of their creation, including fossil crinoids (sea-lilies), corals and brachiopods.

At the end of the Permian (299–252 million years ago) and Triassic periods, the Variscan orogeny resulted in the formation of several mountainous areas including Dartmoor in the south, Exmoor and the Quantocks, and the Mendips.

In the Taunton area Permian (299–252 million years ago) red sandstones and breccia outcrop, although rocks of Triassic age (252–201 million years ago) underlie much of Somerset and form the solid geology of the Somerset Moors and Levels. There are no glacial deposits.

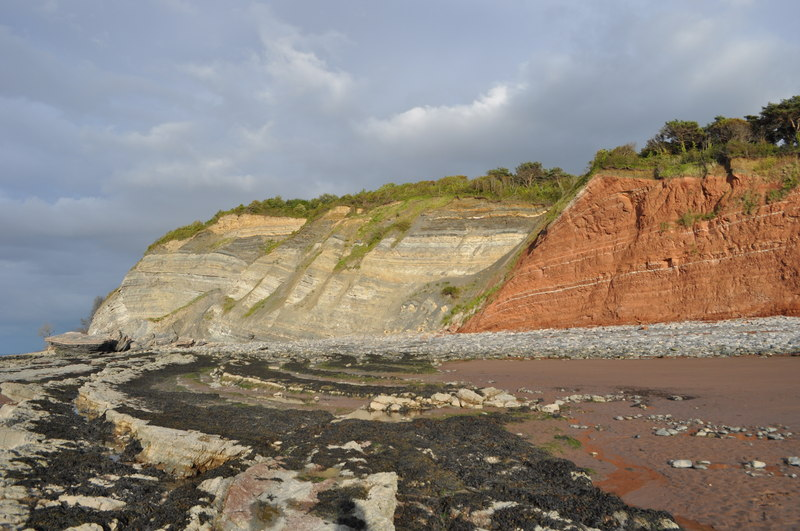
Triassic rocks (right) and Jurassic rocks (left), separated by the Blue Anchor Fault, on the coast of Somerset near Carhampton

The Triassic rocks consist of red marls, sandstones, breccias and conglomerates which spread over the older rocks. The Dolomitic Conglomerate is an old shingle beach of Keuper Marl age. The Rhaetic Beds are full of fossils due to invasion of the Jurassic Sea. The Lias consists of clays and limestones, the latter being quarried and are famous for their fossils. Blue Lias was burnt locally to provide a source of lime for making lime mortar. It is still used as a decorative building stone. Blue Lias is believed to have been quarried on the Polden Hills as early as the 15th century and was quarried in Puriton from the early 19th century until 1973, when the local cement works closed.

Above the Lias is the Lower Oolite Series which are chiefly clays and oolitic limestone. The famous Bath Stone is obtained from the Great Oolite bed. Oxford Clay is the chief member of the Middle Oolite Series; and above this are the Upper Cretaceous rocks with Gault, Upper Greensand and Chalk. Alluvial flats and peat bogs occupy much of the centre of Somerset.

== Coastline ==
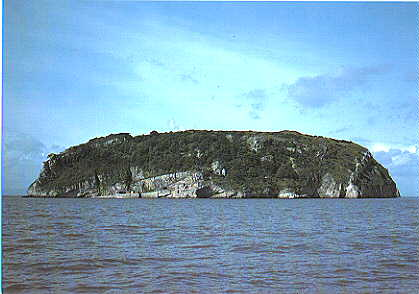
Steep Holm

In prehistoric times the coastline of Somerset was very different from the present one, the sea level at the last glacial maximum being several hundred feet lower than today so that the Bristol Channel was almost non-existent. The Bristol Channel has one of the largest tidal ranges in the world, up to 12 metres (39 ft) at Burnham-on-Sea for example, behind only the Bay of Fundy and Ungava Bay in Canada. Normal high tide may be enhanced by between 3 metres (10 ft) and 4 metres (13 ft) during storm surges. This feature has meant that large areas of the county have been liable to flooding by the sea. Thus the present coastline is partly due to a belt of marine clay at the coast and partly due to seawalls built to reclaim areas previously flooded at high tide. The coastline contains exposures of Devonian sediments and tectonics west of Minehead adjoining the classic exposures of Mesozoic sediments and structural features which extend eastward to the Parrett estuary forming cliffs along the coastline near Clevedon and near Minehead, with low sandhills near Burnham-on-Sea. There are sandy beaches mainly at Burnham-on-Sea, Brean and Weston-super-Mare. There are also storm ridges, salt marsh, and sand dunes.

== Main river valleys ==
The main valleys between the hills are filled with alluvial deposits from the hills or sea. The county has many small rivers, most of which flow into the Bristol Channel. Many of the latter rivers now have clysts (the local name for a sluice) on them to control the sea, but formerly they were tidal for some way inland. The main exception to this is the River Parrett, which still has a tidal bore. However the Chew and the Frome flow into the Avon which forms most of the northern county boundary with Gloucestershire. The Cale flows into Dorset through the Blackmore Vale, while the Exe flows into Devon. The (Dorset) Axe, the Culm and the Otter rise in Somerset but flow into Devon.

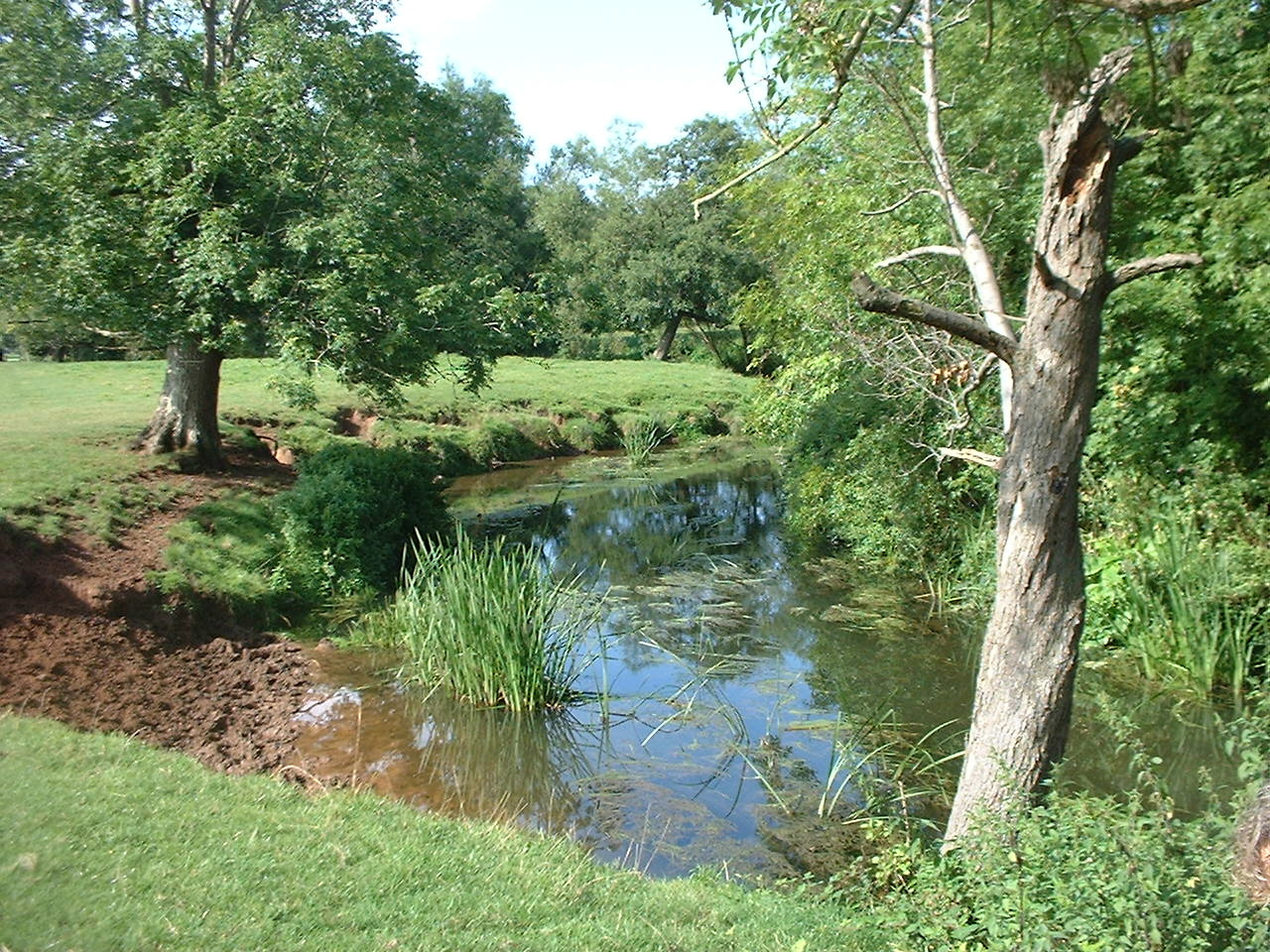
River Chew between Stanton Drew and Pensford

The courses of the rivers Parrett, Somerset Axe, Brue and Cary run across the Somerset Levels and have generally been changed to improve the flow. The River Axe rises from Wookey Hole Caves, due to water draining into the ground at swallet holes on top of the Mendips. The river passes through Panborough Moor, Wedmore Moor, Ox Moor, Stoke Moor and Mark Moor and reaches the sea at Uphill (near Weston-super-Mare) on Bridgwater Bay.

The River Brue rises at Brewham, close to the county border with Wiltshire. It flows through Bruton and is joined by the rivers Pitt and Alham. The river then flows past East and West Lydford to Baltonsborough and then turns north to Street across Butts Moor, South Moor and Kennard Moor. Originally it then joined the Axe but now it flows west across Westhay Moor, Tealham and Tadham Moors, Chilton Moor, Mark Moor and Huntspill Moor. It is joined by the North Drain and the Hartlake river. In Huntspill Moor the Brue is linked to the man-made Huntspill river by the artificial Cripps river. The Brue reaches the sea near Burnham-on-Sea.

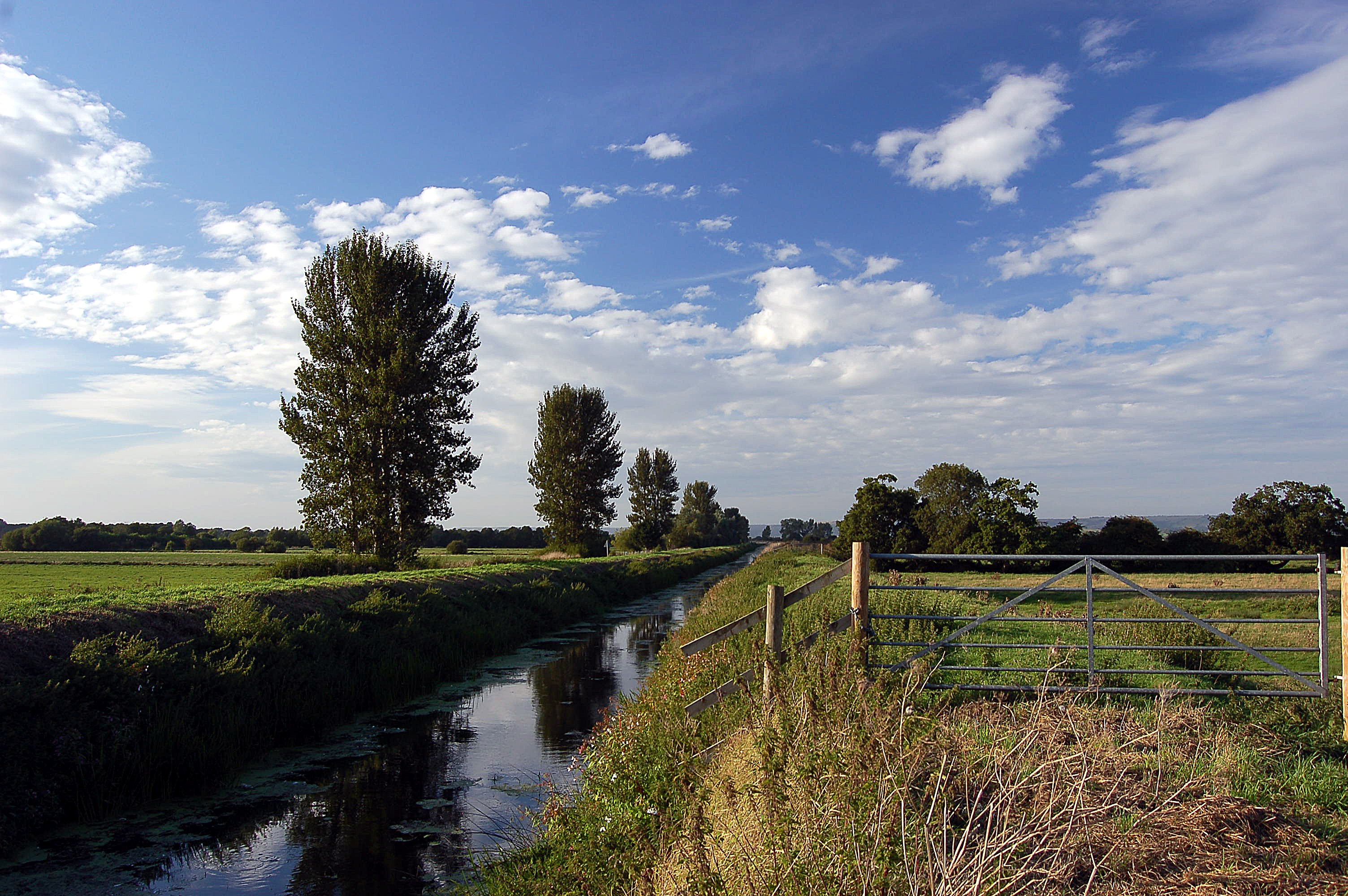
River Brue near Glastonbury

The River Cary originates in Castle Cary in the east of Somerset. It flows south-west through Cary Moor to Cary Fitzpaine. The river then turns north-west to the north of Somerton. It then used to turn south to join the Parrett but now passes through Somerton Moor and crosses Kings Sedgemoor in an artificial channel, the King's Sedgemoor Drain, joining the Parrett at Dunball north of Bridgwater.

The River Parrett originates at Cheddington, Dorset, just over the border with Somerset. It enters Somerset at Haselbury Plucknett where it is joined by the Broad river. It passes to the east of South Petherton and flows north through Thorney Moor and Muchelney Level and it is then joined by the Isle and Yeo (Ivel) rivers. The Parrett flows through Langport and then through Middle Moor, Aller Moor to Burrowbridge where it is joined by the River Tone. It then passes through Earlake Moor, Hartlake Moor, Weston Level and South Moor. It continues north through Bridgwater, Horsey Level, past Pawlett Ham and Pawlett Level to the coast near Burnham-on-Sea.

The River Tone originates at Beverton Pond on the Brendon Hills in the west of Somerset. It flows south into Clatworthy reservoir and then to Greenham where it changes course to go north-east to Taunton. It continues east through West Moor, Curry and Hay Moors and Stan Moor to Burrowbridge where it meets the Parrett.

The River Exe rises at Exehead on Exmoor and flows south-east to Exton where it is joined by the River Quarme. It then flows south to Exebridge where it meets the Barle and passes into Devon.

== Levels and moors ==
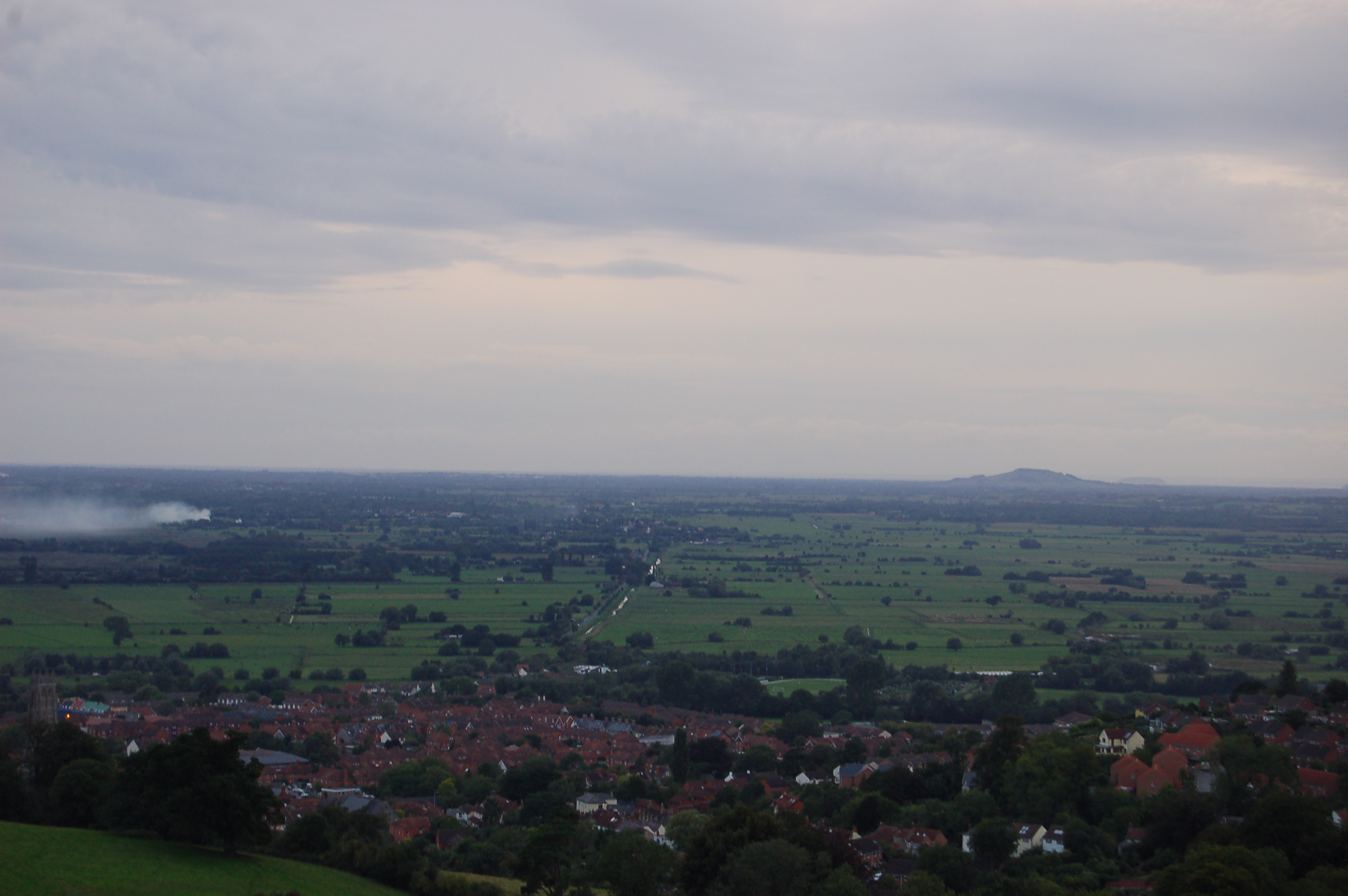
The view towards Brent Knoll from Glastonbury Tor

The North Somerset Levels are to the east of Weston-super-Mare, while the Axe valley is separated by the Isle of Wedmore from the Brue valley. The latter is separated by the Polden Hills from the main wetland of the Parrett/Tone/Cary valleys. The Poldens are a low narrow ridge of Blue Lias with alternating bands of limestone and clay. Because of the nature of the Levels and Moors, the Poldens have a significant visual impact.

The Somerset Levels run from the coast up to 30 kilometres (19 mi) inland. These wetlands cover 600 square kilometres (232 sq mi), most of which is no higher than 8 metres (26 ft) above sea level. There are coastal marine clay deposits, and further inland there are many peaty areas. Dotted within this wetland landscape are slightly raised inter-glacial "islands" called burtles. These have been settled from the Mesolithic onward, with wooden causeways linking them to higher ground. There are also rocky outcrops, such as Brent Knoll and Glastonbury Tor which have also housed ancient settlements.

The water levels in the moors and levels are controlled by a series of small narrow canals called rhynes (known as 'rhines' in Avonmouth and Gloucestershire - both are pronounced 'reens'). along with larger drains, gates and pumping stations. The rhynes are often used as field boundary ditches instead of hedges. Some parts are allowed to flood in winter. The area is mainly used for grazing but some peat extraction is carried out.

== Northern uplands ==
This is the area between the River Avon to the north and the Axe valley. The north of Somerset is dominated by the tableland of the Mendip Hills, an area of outstanding natural beauty, stretching from Frome in the east to Crook Peak in the west, with outliers of Bleadon Hill and Brean Down as well as Steep Holm in the Bristol Channel. The highest point is Black Down at 324 metres (1,063 ft). There is an escarpment facing south to the Levels and Moors while the dip slope to the north is broken up.

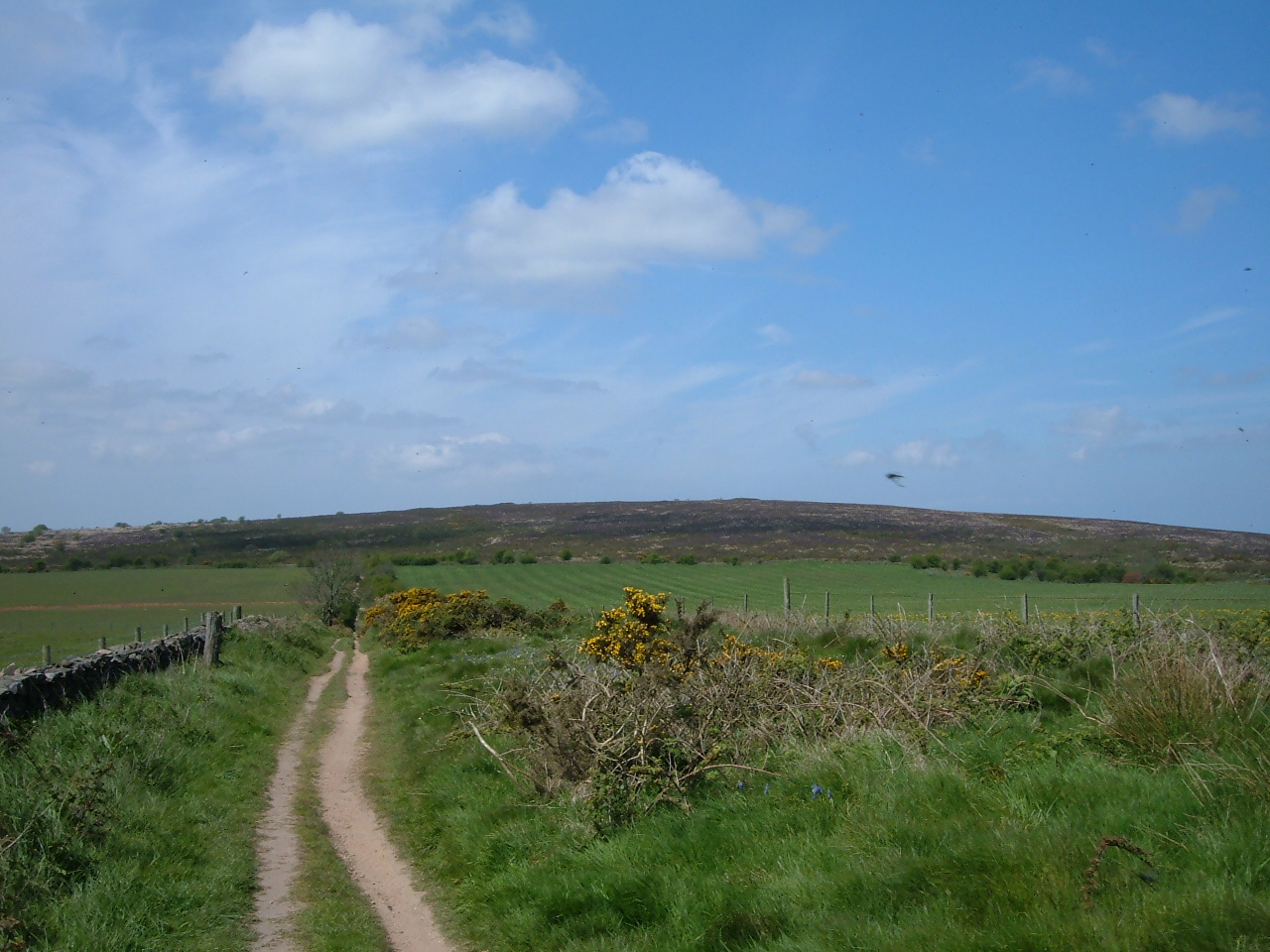
A view of Black Down from near Charterhouse Wireless Station in the Mendip Hills

To the north of Bath are Lansdown, Langridge and Solsbury hills. These are outliers of the Cotswolds. Bath is noted for its thermal waters (48 °C) that are rich in calcium and sodium sulphates.

The Old Red Sandstone is a series of red sandstones, marls and conglomerates. It rises as an anticline in the Mendips and appears in the Avon Gorge and at Portishead. Carboniferous Limestone, of marine origin, covers the sandstone and appears in the Avon Gorge and at Weston-super-Mare where it contains volcanic rocks. There are outlying hills at Worlebury, Middle Hope, the Failand Ridge, Broadfields Down, Portishead Down and Wrington Hill.

The main geological component of the Mendips is Carboniferous Limestone. It represents the remnants of a much higher range of hills that existed hundreds of millions years ago. This has allowed the formation of features such as Cheddar Gorge, Ebbor Gorge and Burrington Combe. There are a wide variety of caves and swallet holes caused by dissolution of the rock by water. Further east there are Silurian volcanoes, Carboniferous Limestone outcrops, Variscan thrust tectonics, Permo-Triassic conglomerates, sediment-filled fissures, a classic unconformity, Jurassic clays and limestones, Cretaceous Greensand and chalk topped with Tertiary remnants including Sarsen Stones. These sediments have yielded a fairly rich fossil fauna of brachiopods and trilobites indicating that they were deposited in a shallow marine sea into which the lavas were extruded. The rocks are quarried at Moons Hill near Stoke St Michael for aggregate.

Coal measures appear in the Radstock district, and surrounding Somerset Coalfield (largely concealed by Triassic and newer rocks). There are two series of coal-bearing sandstones and shales separated by Pennant Sandstone. Locally the beds are folded and faulted. There were mines in the Radstock and Nailsea areas but these have closed. This was one of the first areas in the world to undergo systematic geological study and mapping by John Strachey and William Smith in the 18th century. They observed the rock layers, or strata, which led Smith to the creation of a testable hypothesis, which he termed the Principle of Faunal Succession.

The Mendips were mined for lead, silver, coal, ochre, fuller's earth and zinc but this has finished. They were also quarried for stone, notably at Bath and Doulting. Today the Mendips are a major source of aggregates.

== Southern uplands ==
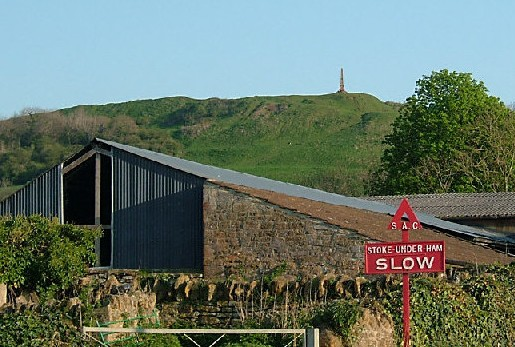
Ham Hill summit and war memorial seen from Stoke-sub-Hamdon

To the south of Somerset there is an upland with a series of rolling valleys and scarps, from Penselwood in the east to the Blackdown Hills, another designated Area of Outstanding Natural Beauty, in the west. This is a geologically complex area of clays, limestone and marl. The honey-coloured limestone at Ham Hill (also known as Hamdon Hill) is particularly important to geologists because of the assemblages of fossils which it contains, the sedimentary features which it displays and the way it relates to other rocks of equivalent age in the close vicinity. It has been quarried since Roman times at least.

The Blackdowns are on the south-west border of Somerset, extending into Devon. They are composed of Upper Greensand. The scarp faces north and is steep and wooded, with a south facing dip slope. There is an open plateau, which is not as high as the Mendips.

The Quantock Hills are a 20 kilometres (12 mi) long broad ridge from the coast near Watchet in the north to near Taunton in the south. They reach 384 metres (1,260 ft) high at Wills Neck and are separated from Exmoor and the Brendons by a rift valley. The Quantocks and the Brendon Hills at the eastern end of Exmoor are formed by thick sequences of slates and sandstones of Devonian age that were deposited by large deltas that built out into a shallow sea.

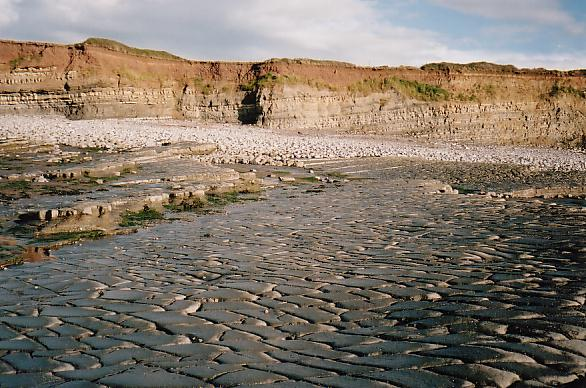
Beach at Quantoxhead. The wave cut platform at low tide. The short 'cliff' shows the rock strata

The Quantock Hills are largely formed by rocks of the Devonian Period, which consist of sediments originally laid down under a shallow sea and slowly compressed into solid rock. In the higher north western areas older Early Devonian rocks, known as Hangman Grits, predominate, and can be seen in the exposed rock at West Quantoxhead quarry, which were worked for road building. Further south there are newer Middle and Late Devonian rocks, known as Ilfracombe beds and Morte Slates. These include sandstone and limestone, which have been quarried near Aisholt. At Great Holwell, south of Aisholt, there is a limestone cave, which is the only one in the Devonian limestone of North Devon and West Somerset. The lower fringes around the hills are composed of younger rocks of the Triassic period, these are known as New Red Sandstone rocks which represent the deposits of large river systems that crossed a desert plain, and often contain irregular masses or veins of gypsum, which was worked on the foreshore at Watchet. The scarp is to the west with a dip slope to the east. The west side is cut by combes with broad valleys on the east. The hill tops are open heathland with woods on the slopes.

Several areas have outcrops of slates and between St Audries and Kilve, younger rocks of the Jurassic Period can be found. This area falls within the Blue Anchor to Lilstock Site of Special Scientific Interest (SSSI) and is considered to be of international geological importance. At Kilve are the remains of a red brick retort, built in 1924, when it was discovered that the shale found in the cliffs was rich in oil. At Blue Anchor the coloured alabaster found in the cliffs gave rise to the name of the colour "Watchet Blue".

== Exmoor ==
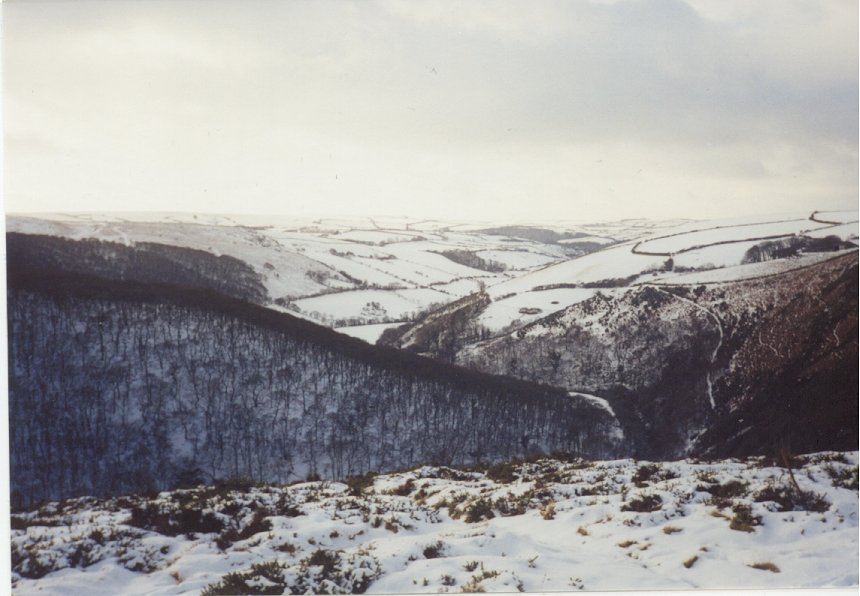
Exmoor in winter

Exmoor is a dissected plateau of Devonian sedimentary rock, rising to 517 metres (1,696 ft) at Dunkery Beacon. It extends into Devon but the majority of the area is in Somerset. Much of the area is a National Park. The landscape is one of rounded hills, with hogs-back cliffs at the coast due to geological movements. Because of high rainfall there are boggy areas and the part by the Chains is a Geological Conservation Review site recognised as being nationally important for its south-western lowland heath communities and for transitions from ancient semi-natural woodland through upland heath to blanket mire. The Chains provides palynological record of a mid to late Flandrian vegetation history on Exmoor. The pollen sequence in the peat is calibrated by radiocarbon dating. The Glenthorne area demonstrates the Trentishoe Formation of the Hangman Sandstone Group. The Hangman Sandstone represents the Middle Devonian sequence of North Devon and Somerset. These unusual freshwater deposits in the Hangman Grits, were mainly formed in desert conditions.

As this area of Britain was not subject to glaciation, the plateau remains as a remarkably old landform. Quartz and iron mineralisation can be detected in outcrops and subsoil. The underlying rocks are covered by moors are supported by wet, acid soil. The highest point on Exmoor is Dunkery Beacon; at 519 metres (1,703 ft) it is also the highest point in Somerset.

Exmoor has 55 kilometres (34 mi) of coastline, including the highest cliffs in England, which reach a height of 1,350 feet (411 m) at Culbone Hill. However, the crest of this coastal ridge of hills is more than 1.6 kilometres (1.0 mi) from the sea. If a cliff is defined as having a slope greater than 60 degrees, the highest cliff on mainland Britain is Great Hangman near Combe Martin at 318 metres (1,043 ft) high, with a cliff face of 214 metres (702 ft). Its sister cliff is the 218 metres (715 ft) Little Hangman, which marks the edge of Exmoor.

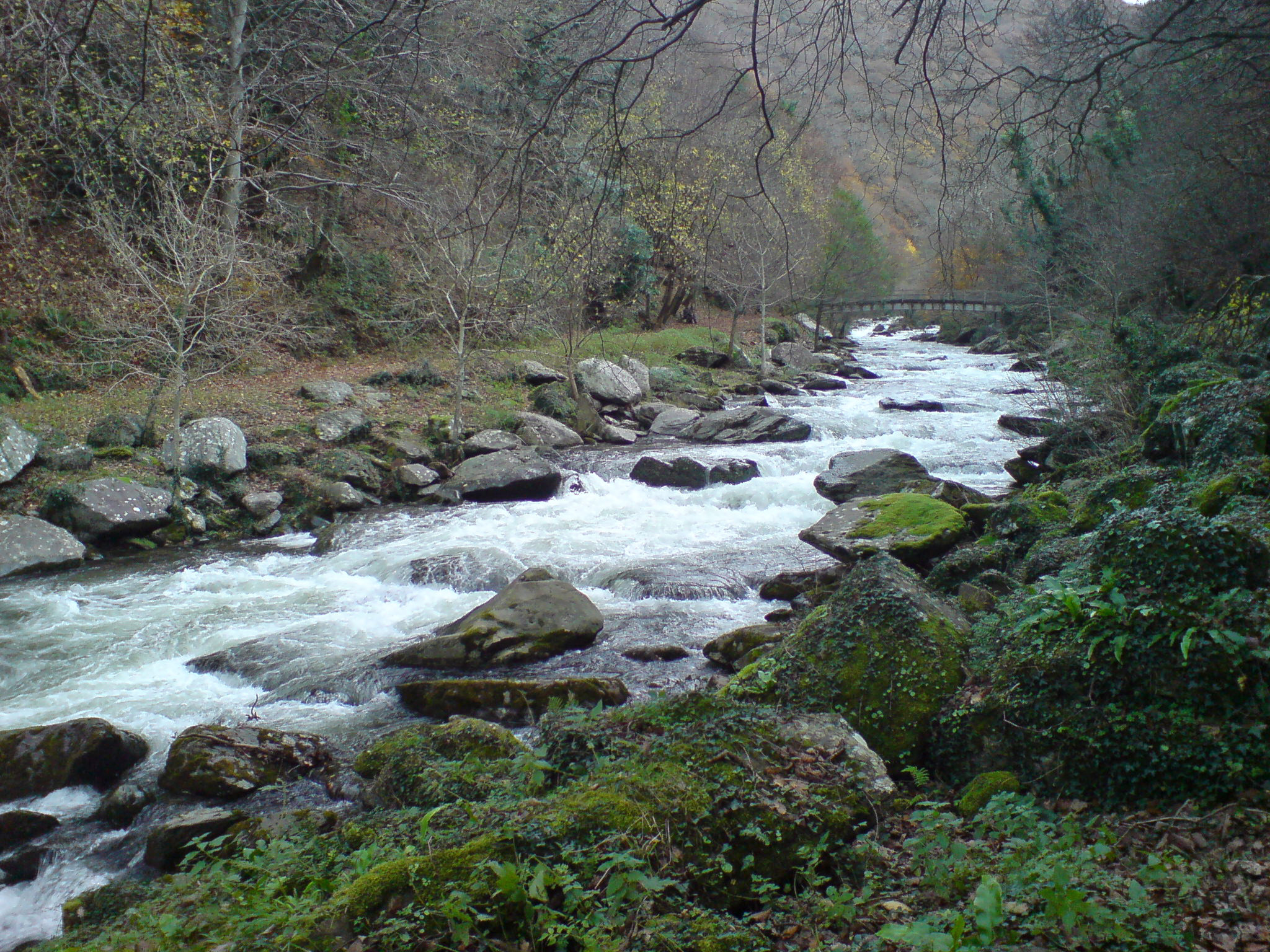
The East Lyn River

The high ground forms the catchment area for numerous rivers and streams. There are about 300 miles (483 km) of named rivers on Exmoor. The River Exe, from which Exmoor takes its name, rises at Exe Head near the village of Simonsbath, close to the Bristol Channel coast, but flows more or less directly due south, so that most of its length lies in Devon. The river and the Barle Valley are both designated as biological sites of Special Scientific Interest. Another tributary, the River Haddeo, flows from the Wimbleball Lake.

The action of streams has cut combes through the hills down to the sea, which are now wooded, although much of Exmoor is open heathland. There is an outlier of Exmoor at North Hill near Minehead. Iron working was formerly carried out, probably from the Roman period onward.

The Brendon Hills are an eastern outlier of Exmoor with the same undulating landscape but separated from the main area by the valley of the River Avill. They reach a height of 422 metres (1,385 ft) at Lype Hill. Iron ore mining was carried out from Roman times up to the early 20th century.

== See also ==
- Somerset
- Geology of the UK
- History of Somerset
- Geology of England
