= Tarr Steps =

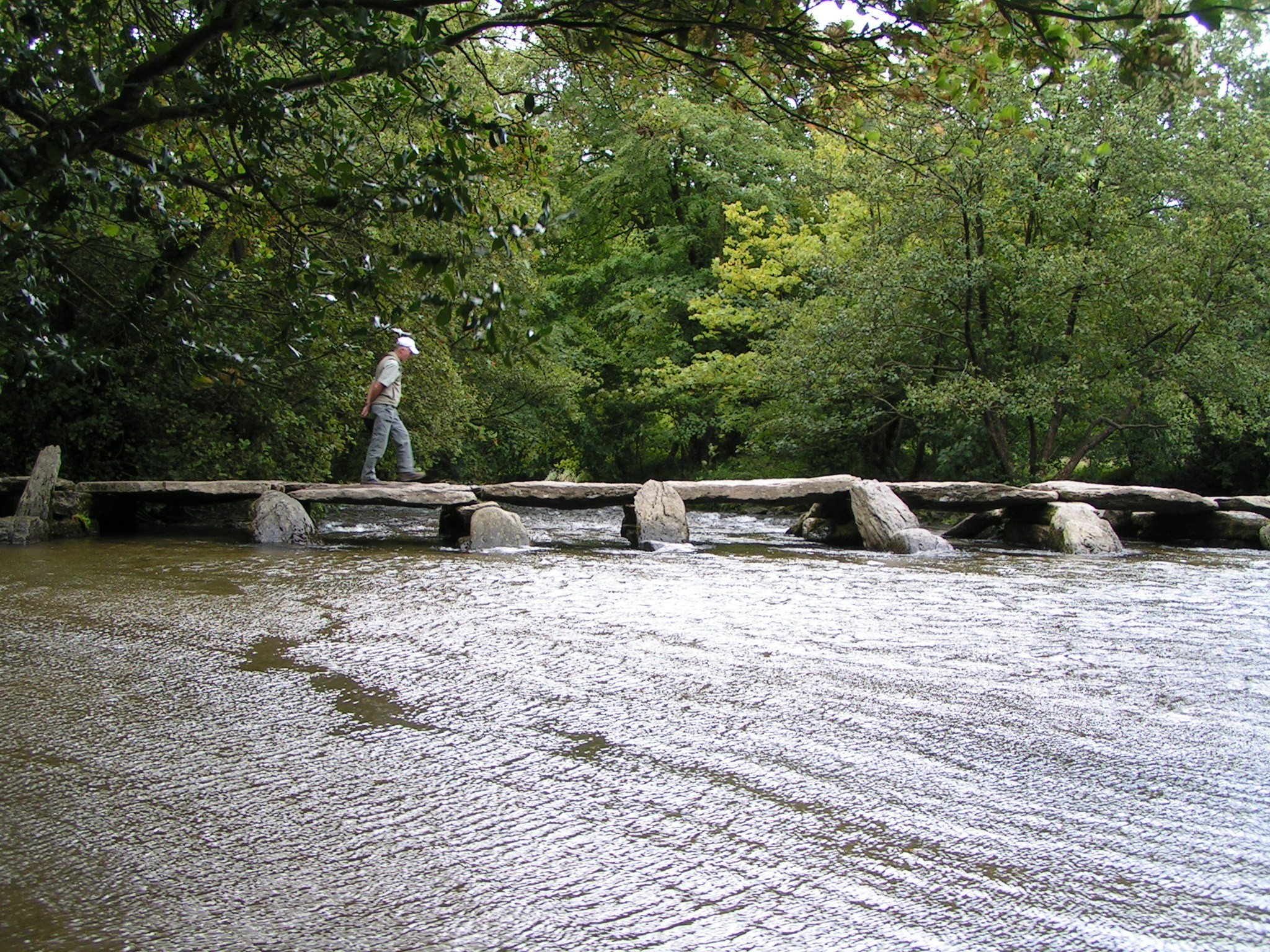
- Tarr Steps viewed from upstream
- Coordinates: 51.077°N 3.618°W
- Crosses: River Barle
- Locale: Exmoor National Park, Somerset, England

Characteristics
- Design: Clapper bridge
- Material: Stone slabs
- Total length: 55 metres (180 ft)
- No. of spans: 17

Location
- Interactive map of Tarr Steps

Tarr Steps is a clapper bridge across the River Barle in the Exmoor National Park, Somerset, England. The bridge is in a national nature reserve about 2.5 miles (4 km) south east of Withypool and 4 miles (6 km) north west of Dulverton.

A typical clapper bridge construction, the bridge's listing assesses it as medieval in origin. The stone slabs weigh up to two tons each. The bridge is 180 feet (55 m) long and has 17 spans. It has been designated as a Grade I listed building and scheduled monument.

The bridge is frequently washed away in extreme weather, then the blocks are put back in place.

== Nature reserve ==
Owned by Exmoor National Park Authority, Tarr Steps Woodland National Nature Reserve covers 33 hectares of the River Barle valley. This is mainly sessile oak (Quercus petraea) woodland, with beech (Fagus), ash, sycamore (Acer pseudoplatanus), hazel (Corylus), blackberry (Rubus), bluebells (Hyacinthoides non-scripta) and honeysuckle (Lonicera). It is internationally significant for the mosses, liverworts and lichens that flourish in the cool damp conditions. Much of the woodland was once coppiced, primarily to provide charcoal for the local iron smelting industry. The river and the valley woodlands are part of the Barle Valley Site of Special Scientific Interest and abound with wildlife, ranging from red deer to dormice, including the rare barbastelle bat (Barbastella barbastellus) and otter that feed along the unpolluted and fast-flowing river.

Well-marked footpaths run along the valley between Simonsbath and Dulverton and to the village of Withypool. There is a circular walk from the main car park for Tarr Steps down to the river, along the riverbank for about 1.3 kilometres (1 mi) to a footbridge and returning on the other side, crossing the river on the clapper bridge. The main car park and toilets (some 400 metres (1,312 ft) from the bridge via a footpath) can be reached from the B3223 road between Withypool and Dulverton. Parking for the disabled and refreshments are available nearer the bridge, as are information panels put up by the Exmoor National Park, giving details of Tarr Steps' history and design.

== Bridge ==
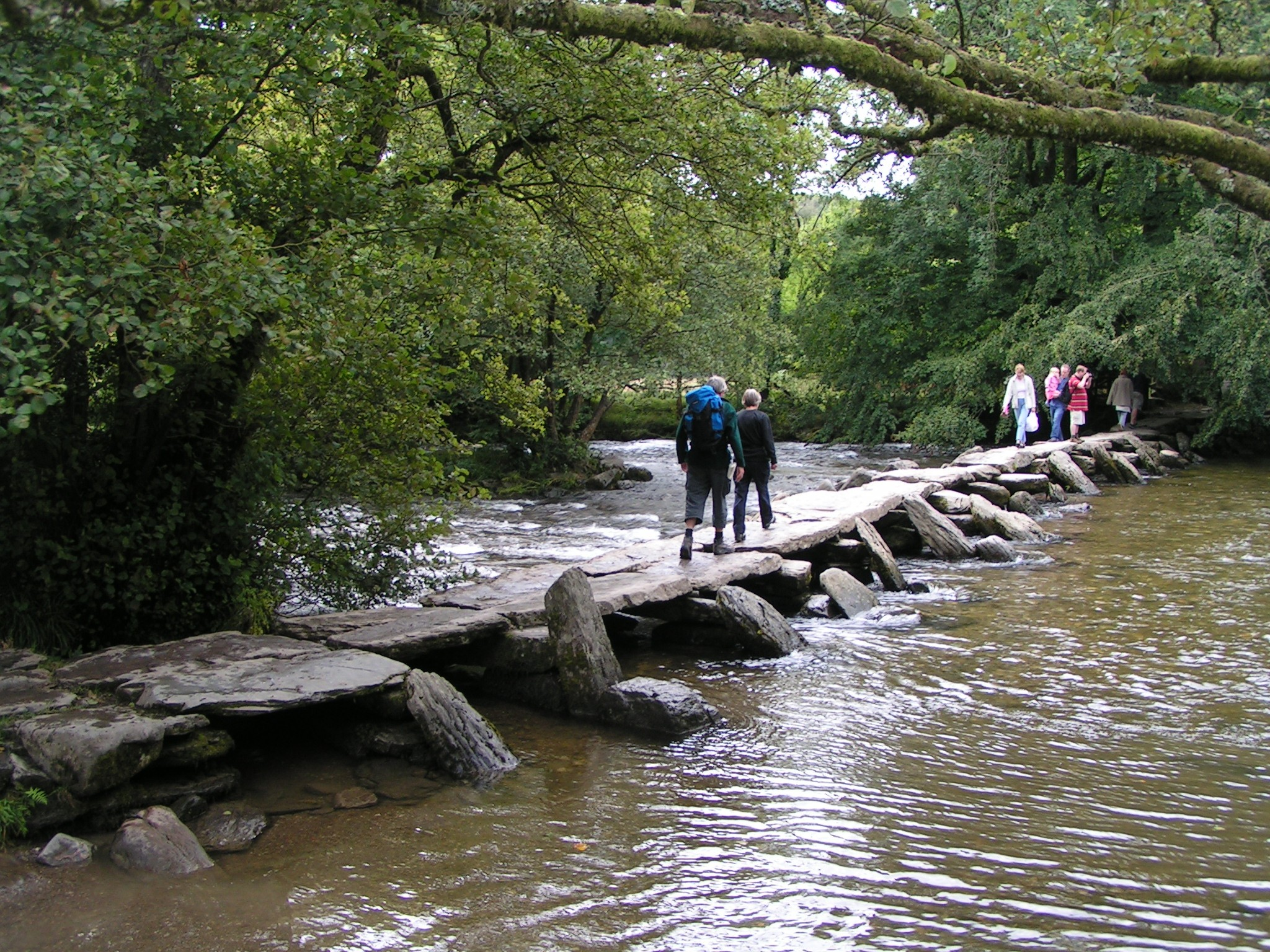
Tarr Steps from river right

Within the reserve is the scheduled monument Tarr Steps (SS867321), a clapper bridge over the River Barle and the best-known monuments on Exmoor. The name "clapper bridge" comes from the Medieval Latin claperius, meaning "pile of stones". It is an ancient form of bridge constructed with large unmortared slabs of stone resting on one another; this is the largest example of its type. There are 17 spans across 50 metres (55 yd), the top slabs weigh 1–2 tons and are about 39 inches (99 cm) above normal water level. The largest slab is over 8 feet (2.4 m) long and is about 5 feet (1.5 m) wide.. Its age is unknown, as several theories claim that Tarr Steps dates from the Bronze Age but others date them from around 1400 AD. It has been restored several times in recent years, following flood damage. Over the years the damage provides a good indicator of the strength of each flood. Some of the top slabs have been washed away in extreme flood conditions and they have now all been numbered to facilitate replacement. The Exmoor National Park website says:

The stones forming the spans weigh between one and two tons each and have on occasions been washed up to 50 yards downstream. A distinctive feature of Tarr Steps is the slabs that are raked against the ends of each pier to break the force of the river and divert floating debris. Despite this, much of the damage has been due to debris such as branches floating down with the flood and battering the bridge. Debris used to be removed once a year by farmers from the Dulverton and Hawkridge sides of the river but since the flood of 1952 it has been trapped by cables strung across the river upstream of the bridge.

The bridge was badly damaged by floodwater on 22 December 2012 when steel wires upstream (designed to protect the bridge from damaging debris) were broken by fallen trees washed down the river. Floodwaters carried away part of the bridge again on 21 November 2016. Damage became more frequent from the early 21st century: floodwater dismantled the bridge five times in the nine years to late 2026.

== See also ==
- Grade I listed buildings in West Somerset
