= Withypool Bridge =

Bridge in United Kingdom

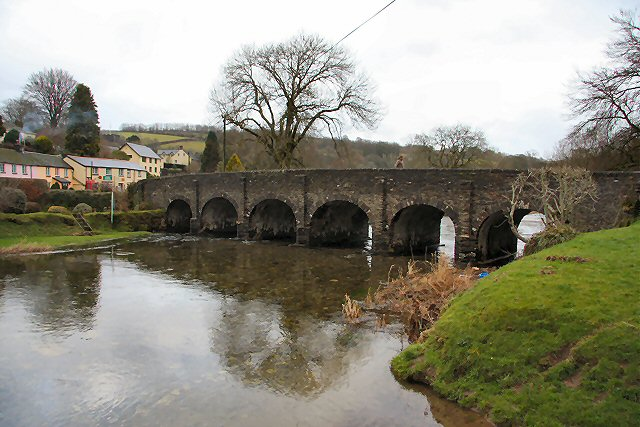
- Coordinates: 51.1067°N 3.651°W
- Carries: Unclassified road
- Crosses: River Barle
- Heritage status: Grade II* listed building

Characteristics
- Design: Arch bridge
- Material: Stone
- No. of spans: Six
- Piers in water: Five

History
- Construction end: 19th century

The Withypool Bridge is an arch bridge that carries a small road over the River Barle at Withypool in Somerset, England. It is a Grade II* listed building.

The red sandstone bridge was built in the 19th century. It replaced an earlier bridge 100 metres (330 ft) upstream of the current site and is therefore shown on some maps as "New Bridge".

The bridge was restored in 1866 and again in 1983.
