= Mary Etherington =

English horse breeder

- Occupation: Horse breeder

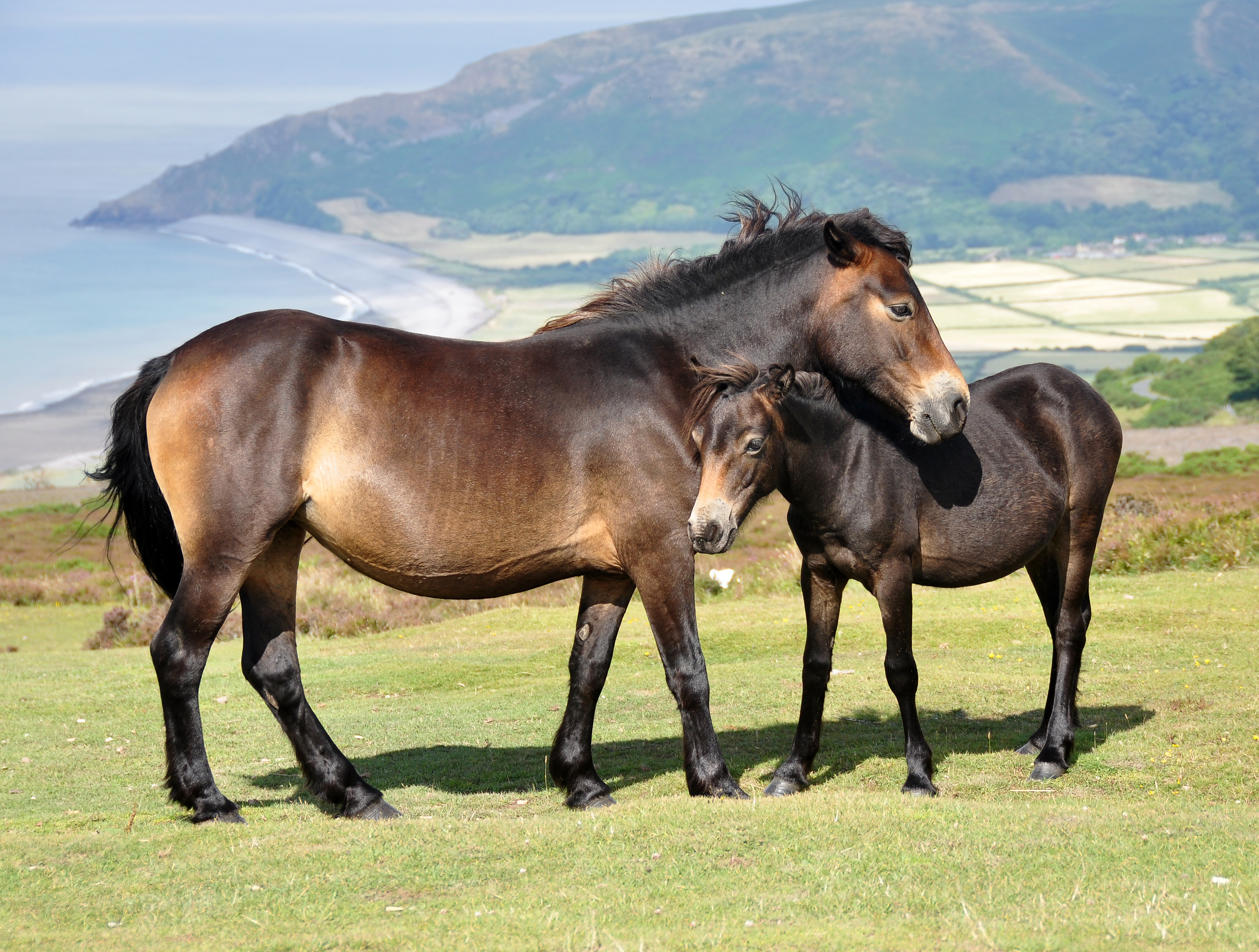
Exmoor pony and foal

Mary Gordon Etherington (1901–1970) was an English horse breeder from Withypool credited with reviving the Exmoor pony population after World War II.

== Background ==
Mary was the daughter of the Rev. Francis M(a)cDonald Etherington, and his wife Diana Gordon of Sevenoaks, daughter of Robert Gordon; they were married in 1899. Etherington was a theology graduate of King's College, London, vicar of Minehead from 1899 to 1914, of Lenham 1914 to 1920, of Stowey 1924 to 1926. He retired to Withypool, and died in 1961.

Originally Herd 2 of Exmoor ponies, as it is now known, was bred by F. G. Heal, in 1930 a pedigree breeder at Exford, Somerset of Exmoor Horn sheep. He was Frederick George Heal, a son of the noted huntsman Arthur Heal, and died unmarried in 1932, aged 75. Heal left the ponies to Diana Etherington. At the Dunster Show in 1937, Mrs F. M. Etherington of Withypool won a prize for a moorland pony. In 1943 they were split between her two daughters, Mary and Joy, with Mary taking Herd 2 and Joy taking Herd 3. Mary Etherington was therefore responsible for the breeding of Herd 2 Exmoor ponies, after they were left to her by her mother.

== After World War II ==
Following World War II, the Exmoor pony population had dwindled to under 50, after ponies had been shot, stolen and killed for food. Mary Etherington rallied breeders together to restore cattle grids and secure boundaries to the common land, in order to re-establish the herds. She stated in 1947

The coming generations will have good reason to call us unfaithful stewards if when we are gone there are no little horses on the Exmoor hills.

In 1948, she exhibited two Exmoor ponies at the London Zoo in order to raise awareness of the threats they faced.

Etherington was consulted in government discussions on increasing the sheep and cattle population in Exmoor in 1949. That year, she left home and moved the herd around England searching for a permanent location. She loaned a number of ponies to Maryon Wilson Park in Greenwich in 1950 which initiated its development into an animal park.

== The Edinburgh connection ==
Around 1949, Etherington was facing a difficult position in her conservation efforts. She was encouraged by Margery Isobel Platt (1903–1952) of the Royal Scottish Museum. As a result she took a pony skull to the Royal (Dick) School of Veterinary Studies in Edinburgh, and began research on it. A project on native pony breeds at the University of Edinburgh was at this time led by James Grant Speed (1906–1980), a Professor of Anatomy. Later, Etherington took her herd of twenty ponies by train to Edinburgh and donated them to the veterinary school for conservation and research.

Etherington and Speed were married on 4 November 1953 at Clinkhill House, Dalgety Bay. Thereafter she appeared in newspaper reports as Mrs. J. G. Speed, or Mrs. Mary G. Speed. In 1960 it was reported that her herd of ponies ran free on the hills around Cleish, some 12 miles (19 km) north of the House.

After Mary's death in 1970, Speed was remarried in 1972, to Marjorie Jane Marriott, former Matron of Middlesex Hospital.

== Exmoor Pony Trekking Society ==
Etherington's ponies were also used to set up the Edinburgh-based Exmoor Pony Trekking Society, after the success of pony trekking at Newtonmore. Mary Stone ran treks each summer from the Snoot Youth Hostel in Hawick. When Mary and her husband decided to sell the Herd 2 Exmoor ponies, the students who had been running the treks formed a syndicate and in 1962 bought a core group of mares. These were bred as Herd 2 until the last foal in 2009. The treks continued from a number of locations around Edinburgh and now run from the Pentland Hills.

== Works ==
- The Exmoor Pony–and a Survey of the Evolution of Horses in Britain Part I (1952) and Part II (1953), both papers published in the British Veterinary Journal with J. G. Speed.

== Document collections ==
- Herd 2, James and Mary Speed and Royal (Dick) veterinary college. Dulverton, United Kingdom: The Exmoor Society.
