= Withypool =

Village in Somerset, England

Coordinates: 51.107125°N 3.651191°W

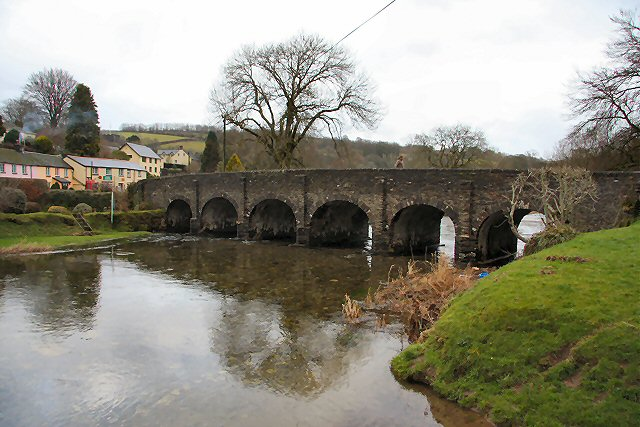
- Bridge over the River Barle

- Location within Somerset
- Population: 201 (201)
- OS grid reference: SS845355
- Civil parish: Withypool and Hawkridge
- Unitary authority: Somerset
- Ceremonial county: Somerset
- Region: South West
- Country: England
- Sovereign state: United Kingdom
- Post town: Minehead
- Postcode district: TA24
- Police: Avon and Somerset
- Fire: Devon and Somerset
- Ambulance: South Western
- UK Parliament: Tiverton and Minehead

Withypool (formerly Widepolle, Widipol, Withypoole) is a small village and former civil parish, now in the parish of Withypool and Hawkridge, in the Somerset district, in the ceremonial county of Somerset, England, near the centre of Exmoor National Park and close to the border with Devon. The word Withy means "willow". The parish of Withypool and Hawkridge, covers 3,097 hectares (7,653 acres), includes the village of Hawkridge and has a population around 201.

Withypool is in the Barle Valley on the River Barle. The village lies on the route of the Two Moors Way and the Celtic Way Exmoor Option.

To the southwest of the village lie Withypool Common and Withypool Hill.

== History ==
The area around Withypool has been inhabited since the Bronze Age and the Withypool Stone Circle can still be seen on top of Withypool Hill. The Brightworthy barrows lie on the Common; of three original, two survive.

Withypool is mentioned in the Domesday Book as being tended by three foresters: Dodo, Almer and Godric. The parishes of Hawkridge and Withypool were part of the Williton and Freemanners Hundred.

In the 14th century, Geoffrey Chaucer was in charge of the village in his duties as forester of North Petherton.

The red sandstone Withypool Bridge (or New Bridge) carries a small road over the River Barle. It was built in the 19th century and is a Grade II* listed building.

=== Civil parish ===
On 1 April 1933 part of the parish of Hawkridge was merged with Withypool, on 1 June 1992 the merged parish was renamed "Withypool & Hawkridge". In 1931 the parish of Withypool (prior to the merge) had a population of 222.

== Governance ==
The parish council has responsibility for local issues, including setting an annual precept (local rate) to cover the council’s operating costs and producing annual accounts for public scrutiny. The parish council evaluates local planning applications and works with the local police, district council officers, and neighbourhood watch groups on matters of crime, security, and traffic. The parish council's role also includes initiating projects for the maintenance and repair of parish facilities, as well as consulting with the district council on the maintenance, repair, and improvement of highways, drainage, footpaths, public transport, and street cleaning. Conservation matters (including trees and listed buildings) and environmental issues are also the responsibility of the council.

For local government purposes, since 1 April 2023, the parish comes under the unitary authority of Somerset Council. Prior to this, the village fell within the non-metropolitan district of Somerset West and Taunton, which was established on 1 April 2019. It was previously in the district of West Somerset, which was formed on 1 April 1974 under the Local Government Act 1972, and part of Dulverton Rural District before 1974.

As Withypool falls within the Exmoor National Park some functions normally administered by district or county councils have, since 1997, fallen under the Exmoor National Park Authority, which is known as a ‘single purpose’ authority, which aims to "conserve and enhance the natural beauty, wildlife and cultural heritage of the National Parks" and "promote opportunities for the understanding and enjoyment of the special qualities of the Parks by the public", including responsibility for the conservation of the historic environment.

It is also part of the Tiverton and Minehead county constituency represented in the House of Commons of the Parliament of the United Kingdom. It elects one Member of Parliament (MP) by the first past the post system of election.

== Landmarks ==
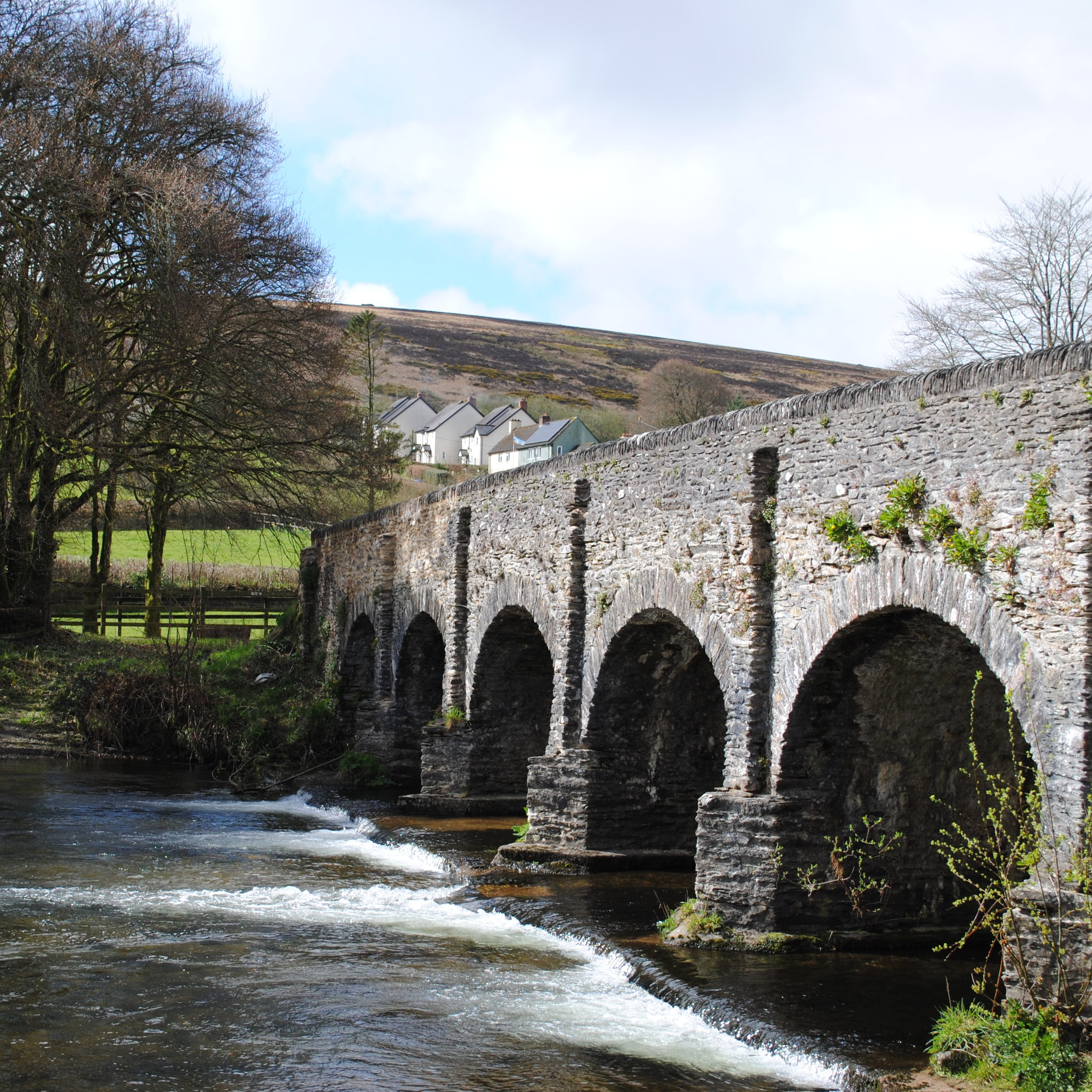
Withypool Bridge over the River Barle.

=== Landacre Bridge ===
2 miles upstream of the village, the River Barle passes under a late medieval five-arch stone Landacre Bridge.

=== Withypool Bridge ===
The Withypool Bridge is a six-arch bridge that carries a small road over the River Barle at Withypool in Somerset, England. It is a Grade II* listed building.

=== The Royal Oak Inn ===
The village's Royal Oak Inn has seen its share of history since its construction in the late 17th century. R. D. Blackmore wrote part of Lorna Doone in the bar, and artist Alfred Munnings had a studio in the loft. In the 1930s, the inn was owned by Gwladys and Maxwell Knight, a spy-ring leader and radio broadcaster upon whom Ian Fleming based the character of James Bond's boss, M. During World War II, the nearby Woolacombe beach was used to simulate the invasion of Normandy, and General Dwight Eisenhower planned some of the operation from the Royal Oak.

== Religious sites ==
The late medieval Church of St Andrew is a Grade II* listed building. The tower was rebuilt in the early 17th century, restored and refitted in 1887, and restored extensively and rebuilt again in 1902.

The Norman Church of St Giles in Hawkridge has 14th-century origins.

== Notable people ==
- Ina Skriver, actress
- Mary Etherington, conservationist
