= Exe Island =

Early industrial area in Exeter, England

Coordinates: 50°43′11″N 3°32′12″W

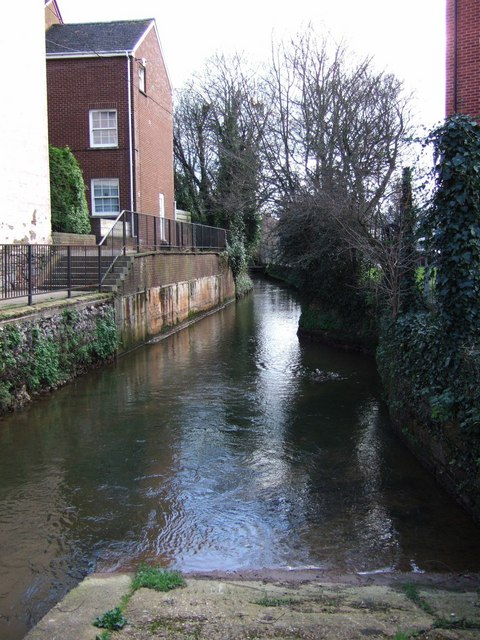
Higher Leat

Exe Island was the early industrial area of Exeter, England, and was an area of marshland between the city walls and the River Exe, reclaimed by the construction of a series of leats, or artificial water courses, possibly from as early as the 10th century. The leats were dug because the bank area was very wet and benefitted from draining. The leats allowed for land reclamation. The Upper Leat, which still exists, created Exe Island, which eventually became a separate manor belonging to the Courtenays, Earls of Devon.

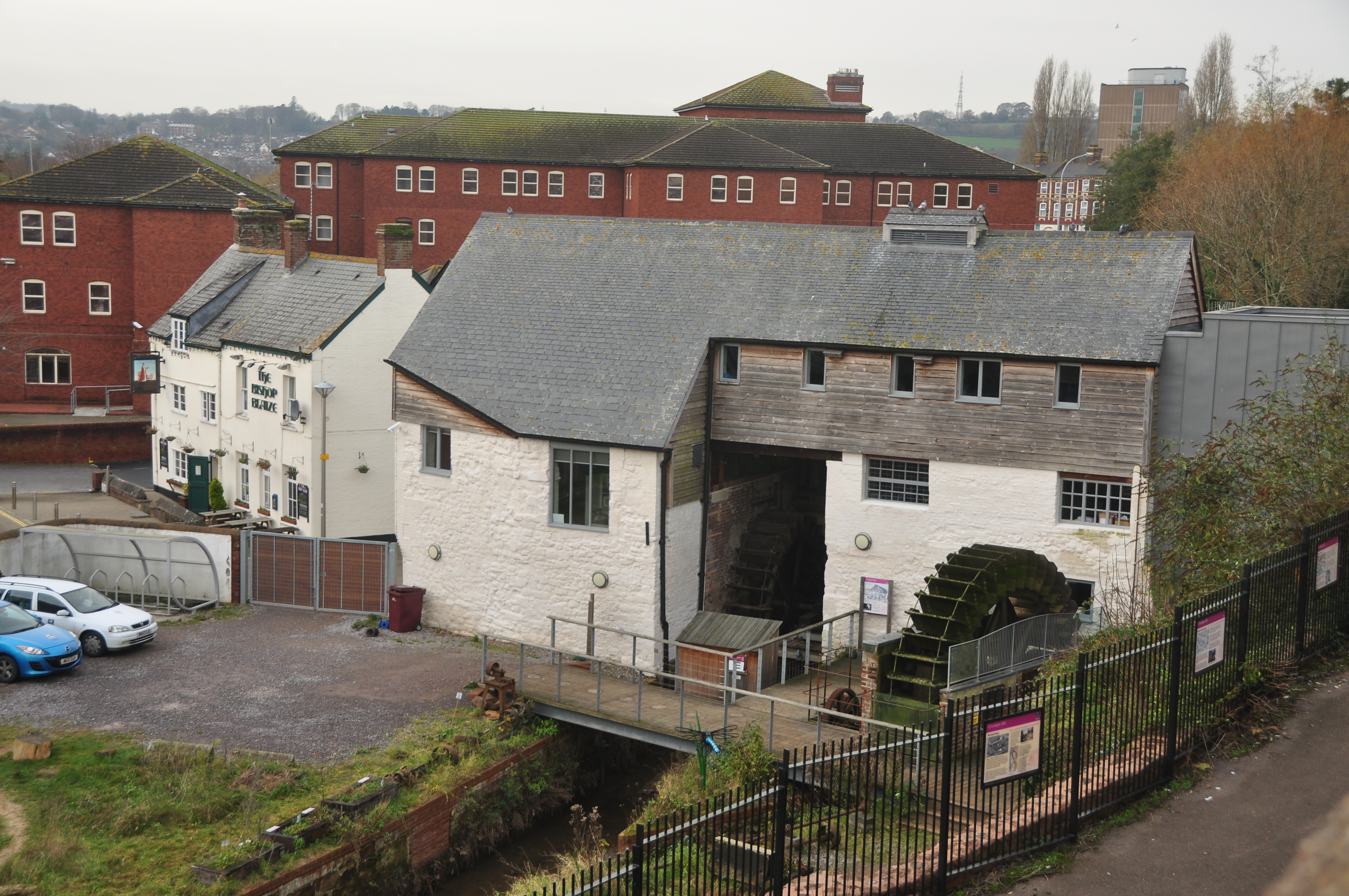
The Cricklepit Mill is the only remaining mill

The Courtenays took over the island after the Norman invasion, between 1180 and 1190. Robert Courtenay allowed Nicholas Gervaise to build a mill; many other mills were built for grinding corn and for the fulling of wool. The leats were used to drive the mill wheels.

Exe Island had become an industrial area by the end of the 12th Century. Industries included tanneries, but archeologists later discovered that the working of horn and bronze had also been common. By the 16th century, cloth finishing was the most significant industry but that declined in the 1800s. By late in that century, iron foundries, corn mills and breweries were more common.

Earlier, in 1549, King Edward granted Exe Island to Exeter, leading to the Prayer Book Rebellion, in favour of Protestant theology in an era when most people were still loyal to Catholicism. The rebellion was put down by Lord John Russell. By 1649, Exe had become the water source for Exeter. The wool industry became very successful after the Civil War making the fulling mills on Exe profitable. In 1778 "Exe Island was effectively cut in two by the new viaduct" although a tunnel under the New Bridge Street allowed for travel between the two sides.

In the 1800s, gas works and foundries replaced many of the mills. The first school was built in 1873.

== Recent developments ==
After the 1950s the industrial buildings were removed so virtually "nothing remains of old Exe Island" according to reliable sources, although the restored Cricklepit Mill, which closed in 1957, is still standing as a tourist attraction. The mill can still be used to produce flour.

The mill is a Grade II Listed property. The summary from 1985 describes it as "Mill with 2 wheels. C17 or C18. C19 machinery. Brick, corrugated iron roof, partly timber frame interior, 2 storeys with attics ... Undershot fed waterwheel with gearing disconnected but in situ. Formerly a corn and grist mill. A secondary wheel is attached within a pit to the east".

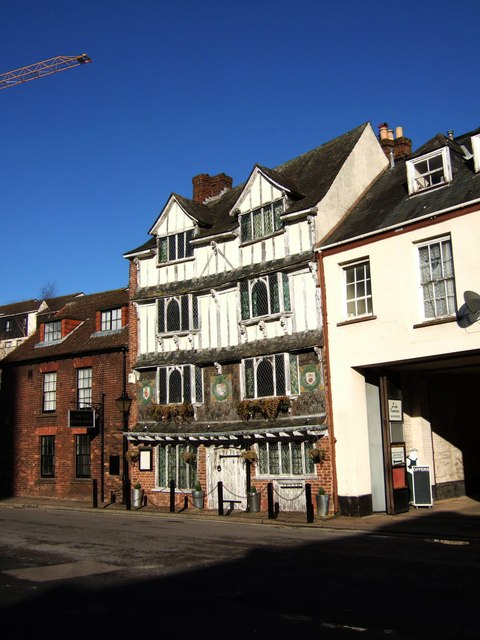
The Tudor House (Tiddy House); 2007 photo

Cricklepit Mill was restored in the 1990s after extensive damage was caused by fire and purchased by Devon Wildlife Trust in 2004 with assistance from the Heritage Lottery Fund. The Trust states that it "is now a small visitor centre and wildlife garden where we run a range of events and activities for the general public". On occasion, flour is produced in a traditional manner.

An old Tudor house, also known as Tiddy House, also still stands; since 1953, it has been a Grade II Listed property. The summary states: "Late C16 4 storey timber-framed house. Ground floor of stone and red brick with 5-light oak mullioned window, now blocked. 1st floor has two splayed oriels on brackets. Top floor has two gabled half-dormers." Other sources suggest it was built in the 1630s and confirm a restoration that started in 1964. Uses during the 20th century included some years as "The Tudor House Restaurant" after being used as an electrical repair shop. Since 1994, the building has been a private residence.
