= River Exe =

River in Devon and Somerset, England

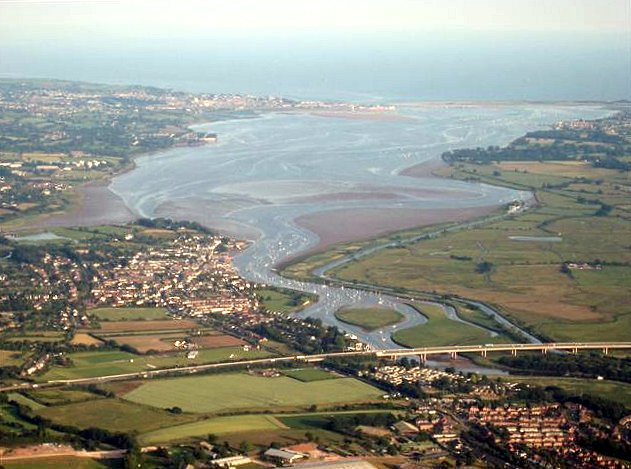
- The Exe Estuary from a balloon over Exeter. The M5 motorway is in the foreground, Topsham on the left bank just beyond, and Exmouth at the river mouth opposite Dawlish Warren.

Location
- Country: England
- Counties: Devon, Somerset
- Settlements: Exeter, Tiverton, Exmouth

Physical characteristics
- Source: Exe Head
  - location: near Simonsbath, Somerset, England
  - coordinates: 51°09′33″N 3°47′12″W
  - elevation: 440 m (1,440 ft)
- Mouth: Lyme Bay
  - location: English Channel
  - coordinates: 50°36′53″N 3°25′30″W
  - elevation: 0 m (0 ft)
- Length: 96 km (60 mi)
- Discharge
  - location: Thorverton
  - average: 15.89 m^{3}/s (561 cu ft/s)
  - minimum: 0.44 m^{3}/s (16 cu ft/s)27 August 1976
  - maximum: 492.6 m^{3}/s (17,400 cu ft/s)4 December 1960
- Discharge
  - location: Stoodleigh
  - average: 12.41 m^{3}/s (438 cu ft/s)
- Discharge
  - location: Pixton
  - average: 4.47 m^{3}/s (158 cu ft/s)

Basin features
- Tributaries
  - left: River Haddeo, River Culm, River Clyst
  - right: River Barle, River Creedy

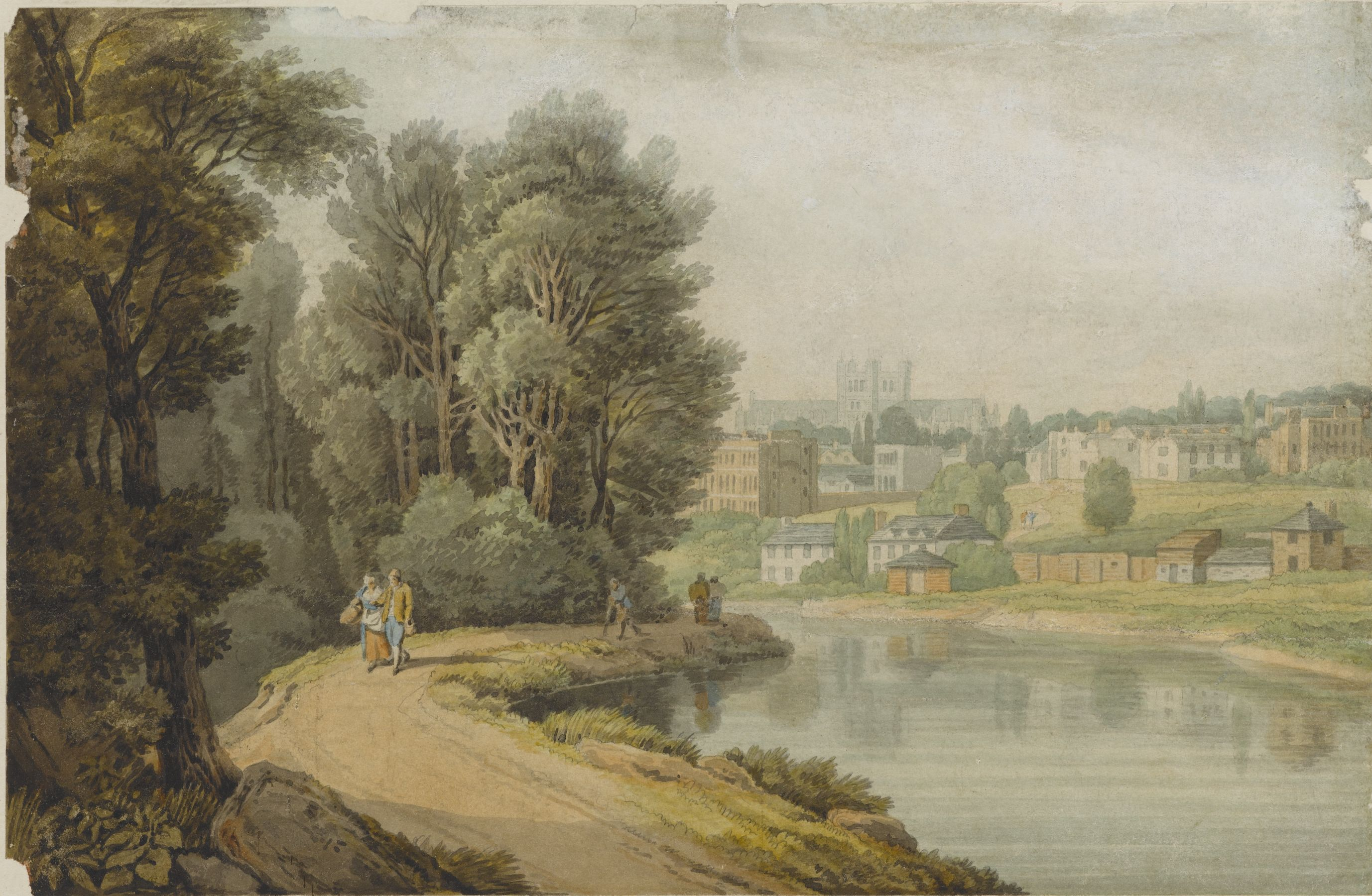
'Exeter as seen from the River'. Watercolour on paper by John White Abbott

Map showing the location of source and mouth within Somerset and Devon

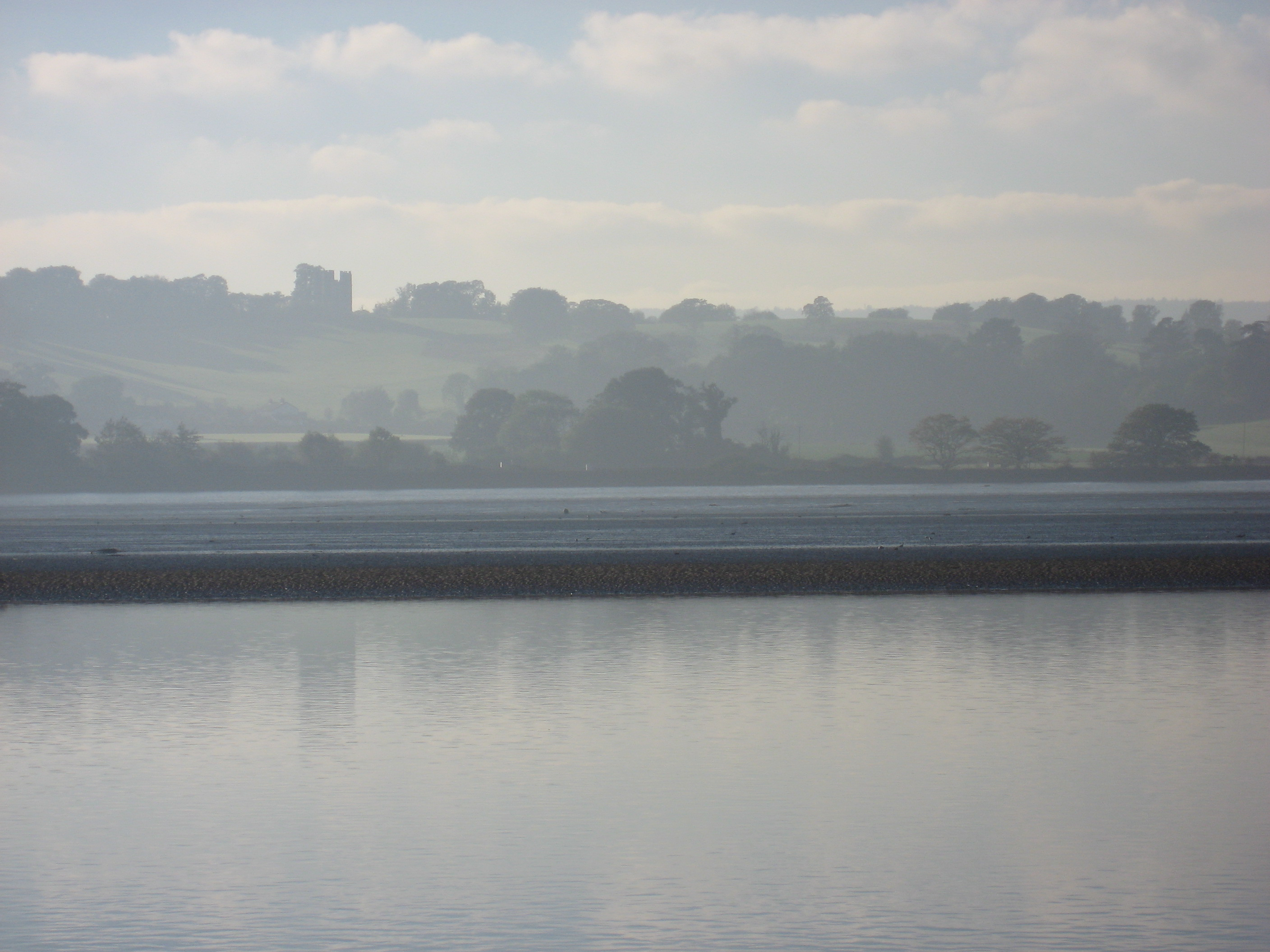
The Exe Estuary with the Belvedere tower of the Powderham Castle estate visible in the background.

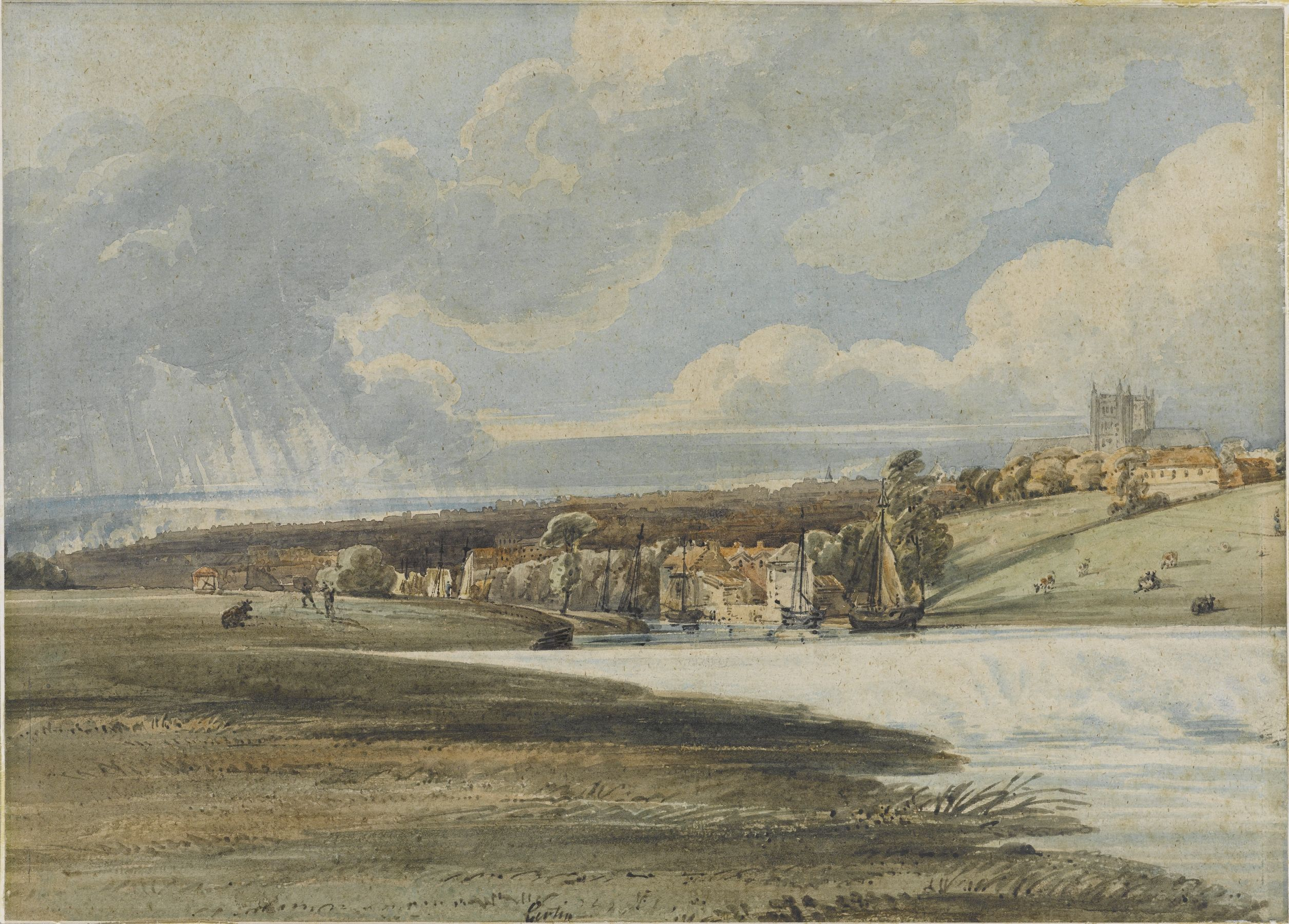
'Exeter from Trew’s Weir' circa 1799. Watercolour on paper by Thomas Girtin

The River Exe (/ˈɛks/ EKS) is a river in England that rises at Exe Head, near the village of Simonsbath, on Exmoor in Somerset, 5.2 miles (8.4 km) from the Bristol Channel coast, but flows more or less directly due south, so that most of its length lies in Devon. It flows for 60 miles (96 km) and reaches the sea at a substantial ria, the Exe Estuary, on the south (English Channel) coast of Devon. Historically, its lowest bridging point was the Old Exe Bridge in Exeter, the largest settlement on the river, but there is now a viaduct for the M5 motorway about 2 miles (3.2 km) south of the city centre.

== Topography ==
The river's name derives from *uɨsk, a Common Brittonic root meaning "abounding in fish", and a cognate of both the Irish iasc, meaning "fish", and pysg, the plural word for "fish" in Welsh. The same root separately developed into the English Axe and Esk, the Welsh Usk, though not, as some have claimed, the word whisky, this latter being from the Classical Irish/Gaelic uisgi "water" (the fuller phrase being uisgi betha; Irish: uisce beatha; Scottish Gaelic: uisge beatha; "aqua vitae" ("water of life")).

The river's name occurs in Exeter ("fortress on the Exe") and many other settlements along its course, including Exford, Up Exe, Nether Exe, Exwick, Exton, Exminster, and Exebridge, where it is joined by the River Barle. The seaside town of Exmouth is at the east side of the estuary mouth, and Dawlish Warren is at the west, with its long sand spit extending across the mouth.

The river fuelled Exeter's growth and relative importance in medieval times. The city's first industrial area was developed at Exe Island, which was created in the 10th century by digging a series of leats into the sandy and marshy land bordering the river. The island became home to numerous watermills producing paper and textiles.

Tides on the river are limited at Trews Weir in Exeter, two kilometres upstream of Countess Wear, the site of a former weir commissioned by the Countess of Devon in the 13th century. The Exeter Canal bypassed this weir to enable ships to reach Exeter Quay. At high tide, the estuary forms a large body of water that is heavily used for water sports, especially sailing, windsurfing and water skiing.

Railways run along both sides of the estuary. The Avocet Line from Exeter to Exmouth on the eastern side, and the South Devon main line on the western. The latter is on a causeway, the South Devon Railway sea wall from Powderham to Dawlish Warren. The Exmouth to Starcross Ferry carries passengers across the mouth of the estuary during the summer months, linking the harbour at Exmouth with a pier adjacent to Starcross railway station on the South Devon main line.

At low tide, extensive mud flats are exposed, and these are an important feeding source for wading birds. Along with other rias in South West England, the Exe estuary is an important site for wintering waders. Dawlish Warren is a favoured site for birdwatching. The river has a low pH but does not suffer from a serious acid rain problem. It is populated with wild brown trout, and in the lower reaches coarse fish including dace, chub, perch, roach, pike and bream and some grayling, the average size being 8–10 ounces (230–280 g). There is a run of Atlantic salmon and a sparse run of sea trout. Just 150 metres (490 ft) below the union of the River Barle is Black Pool, which is one of the best, and highest salmon pools on the river. The smaller fish species present include stone loach and there are good reasons to assume others are present.

== 2008 clearing operation ==
In 2008 the Environment Agency embarked on a project to clear vegetation from the river in Exeter as well as make way for flood defence work. In order to do the former the water level was lowered further than during the worst droughts that Exeter had seen.

== Gallery ==
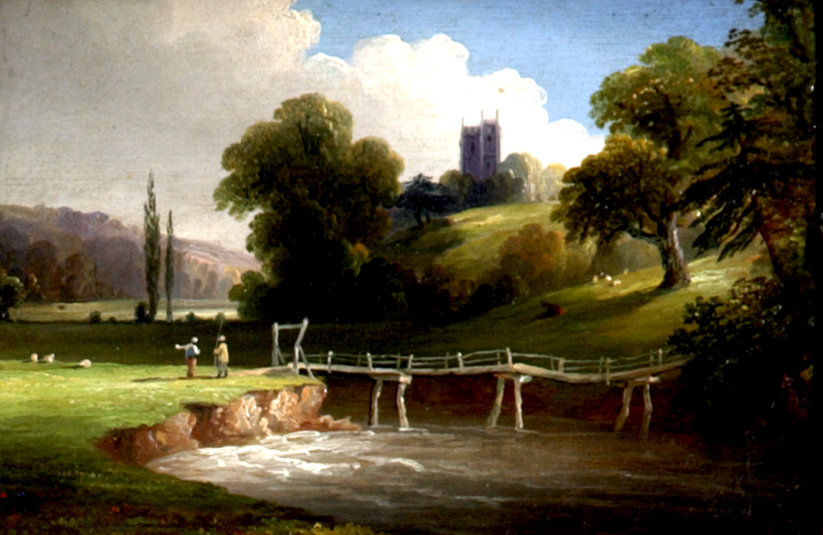
1860s painting by John Wallace Tucker, depicting bridge on the River Exe and St Peter Church at Bramford Speke, Devon

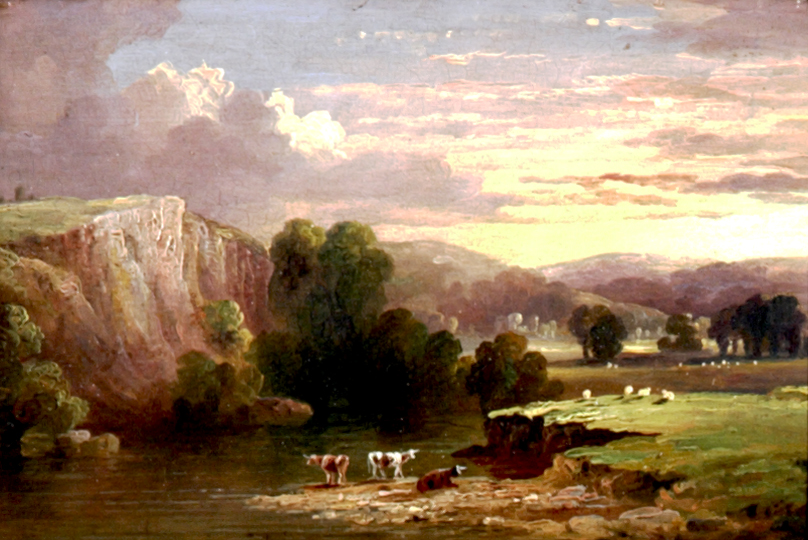
1860s painting by John Wallace Tucker depicting Red Rock, on the River Exe, at Bramford Speke, Devon

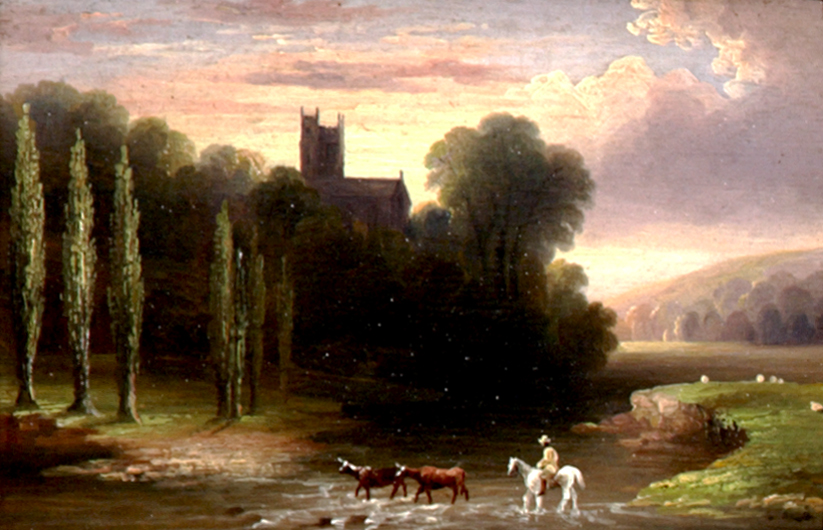
1860s painting by John Wallace Tucker, depicting the River Exe, near Bramford Speke, Devon

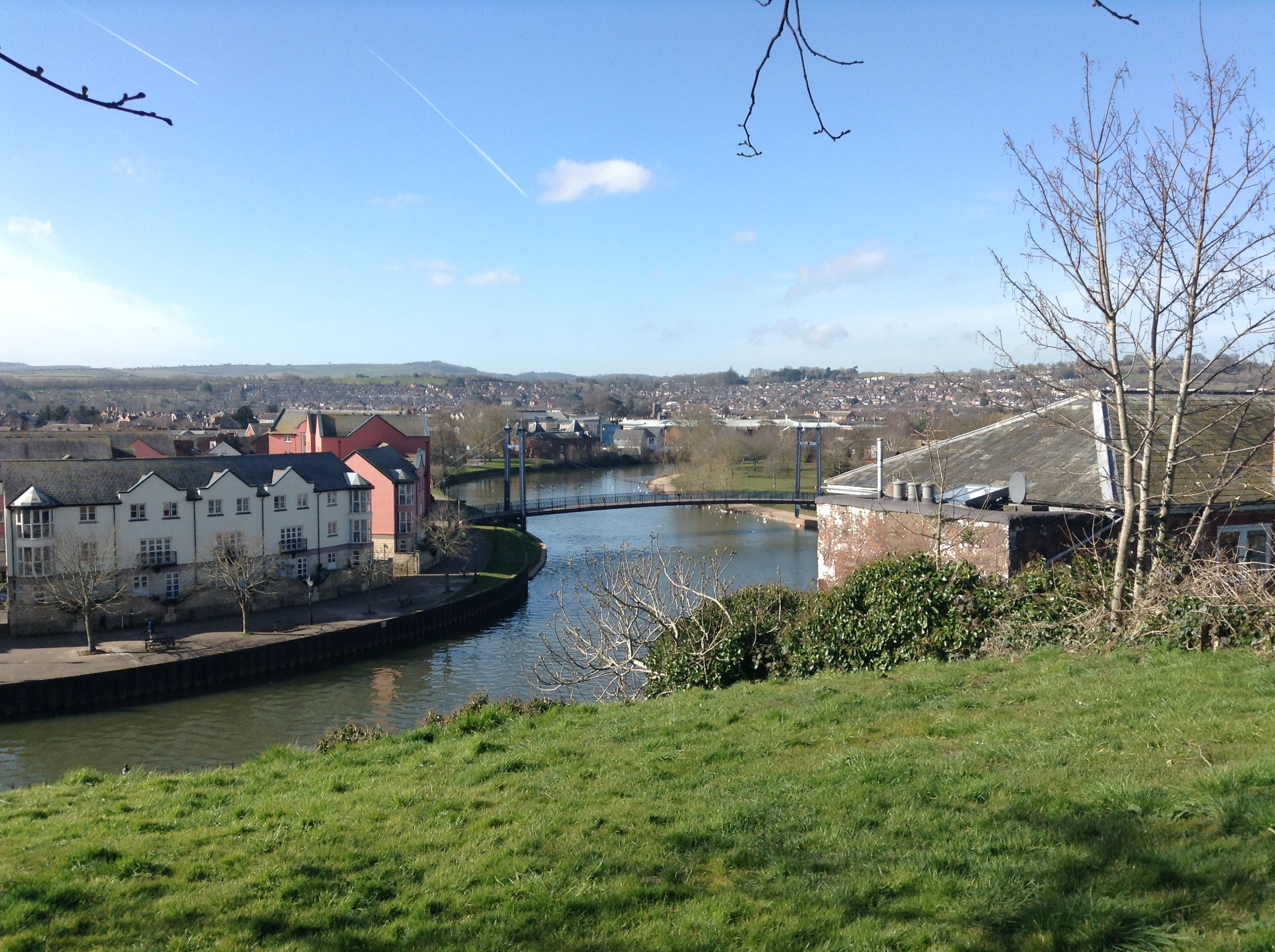
The River Exe at Exeter Quay

== See also ==
- Rivers of the United Kingdom
