= Exebridge =

Village in Devon, England

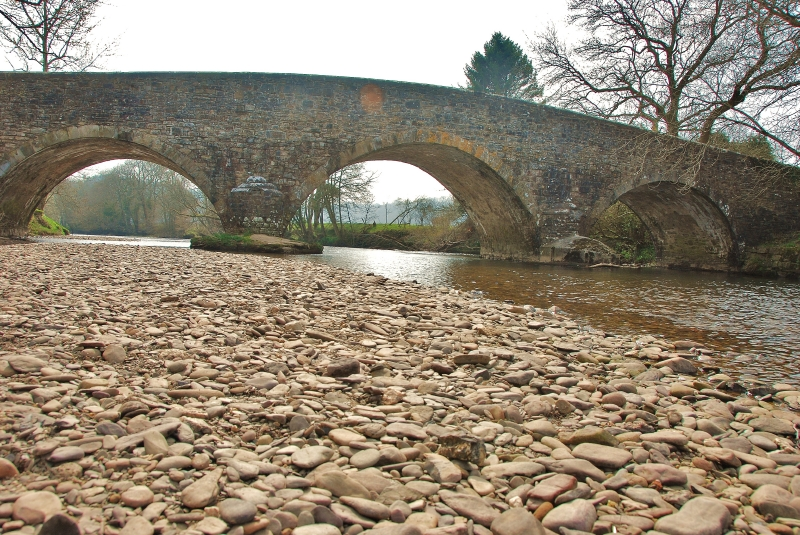
- The bridge from downstream

- Location within Devon
- OS grid reference: SS9346824514
- District: Mid Devon
- Shire county: Devon
- Region: South West
- Country: England
- Sovereign state: United Kingdom
- Post town: DULVERTON
- Postcode district: TA22
- Police: Devon and Cornwall
- Fire: Devon and Somerset
- Ambulance: South Western
- UK Parliament: Tiverton and Minehead

Exebridge is a village that lies on the border between Devon and Somerset, England. It lies at the confluence of the Barle and Exe rivers. Exebridge is named so because of the bridge over the River Exe that also marks the border between Devon and Somerset. It is located at 51°0′35″N 3°31′51″W.
