= River Barle =

River in Somerset and Devon, England

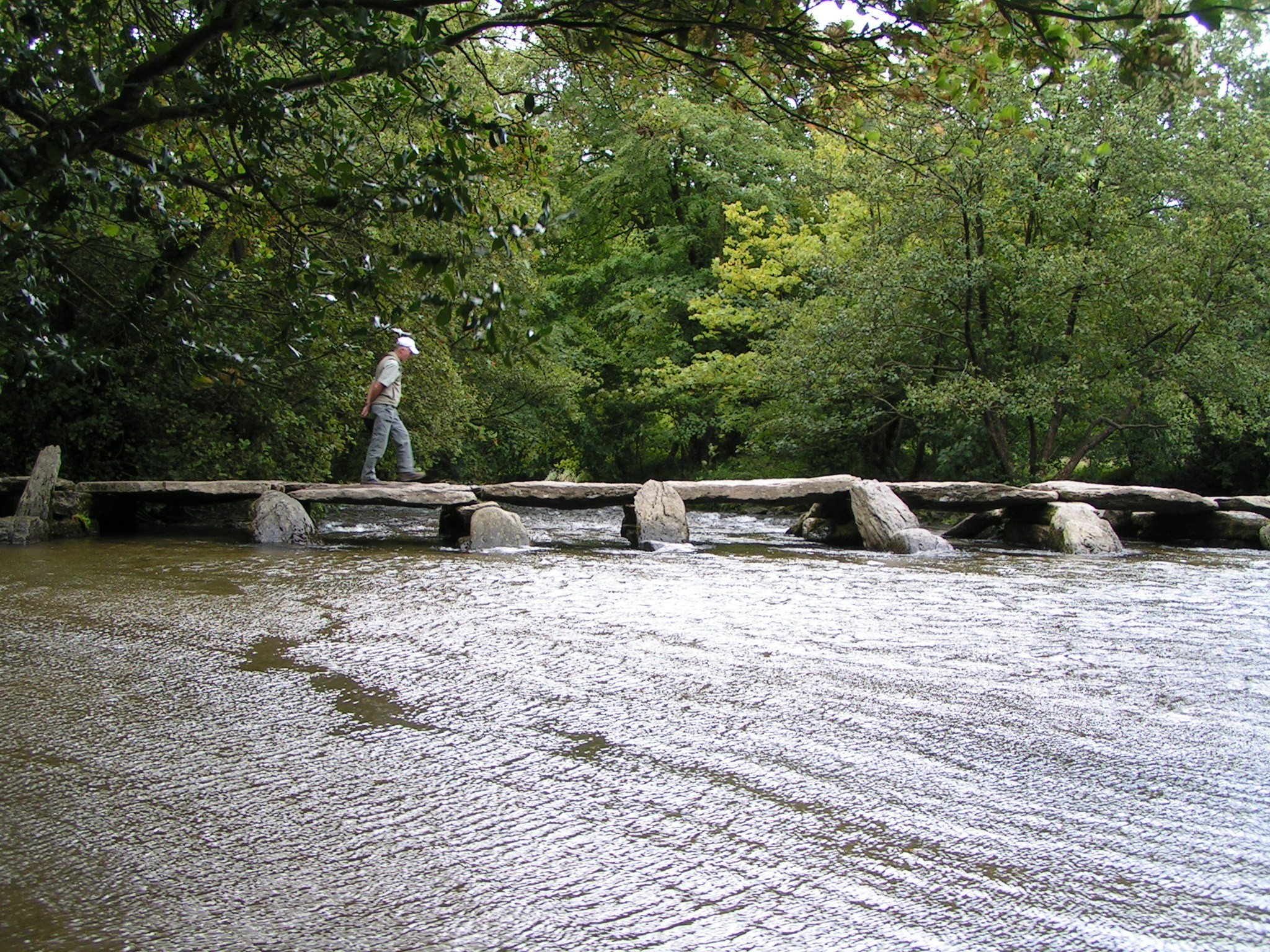
- Tarr Steps viewed downstream

Location
- Country: England
- Counties: Devon, Somerset
- Cities: Withypool, Simonsbath

Physical characteristics
- Source
  - location: Near Simonsbath, Exmoor, Somerset
  - coordinates: 51°08′30″N 3°48′38″W
  - elevation: 400 m (1,300 ft)
- Mouth: River Exe
  - location: Exebridge, Devon
  - coordinates: 51°00′37″N 3°31′55″W
- Length: 39.6 km (24.6 mi)

Basin features
- Tributaries
  - left: Little River
  - right: Sherdon Water

The River Barle runs from the Chains on northern Exmoor, in Somerset, England to join the River Exe at Exebridge, Devon. The river and the Barle Valley are both designated as biological Sites of Special Scientific Interest.

On the Chains above Simonsbath is a 3-acre (1.2-hectare) former reservoir known as Pinkery Pond. It was formed in the 19th century when John Knight and his son dammed the river at that point. Vestiges of a small water channel sometimes referred to as a 'canal' can be seen nearby. Wheal Eliza Mine was an unsuccessful copper and iron mine on the river near Simonsbath.

The river passes under a late medieval six-arch stone Landacre Bridge in Withypool, and the Tarr Steps, a prehistoric clapper bridge possibly dating from 1000 BC. The stone slabs weigh up to 5 tons apiece. According to local legend, they were placed by the devil to win a bet. The bridge is 180 feet (55 m) long and has 17 spans. It has been designated by English Heritage as a grade I listed building. In Dulverton the river is crossed by the Barle Bridge.

== Ecology ==
The river flows through the Somerset Wildlife Trust's Mounsey Wood Nature Reserve and Knaplock and North Barton SSSI, first notified in 1954, which are within Exmoor National Park. These sites are home to species such as the kingfisher and Knaplock and North Barton is one of the only sites of great burnet on Exmoor. The river itself has been recorded as a habitat for the Eurasian otter.

== Recreation ==
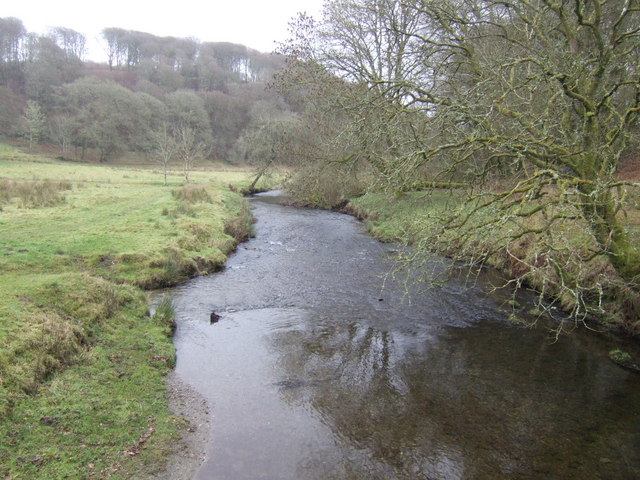
The Barle at Simonsbath

=== Angling ===
Salmon and trout are regularly fished from the Barle.

=== Walking ===
For much of its route, the river's banks are the path of the Two Moors Way footpath.

=== Kayaking and canoeing ===
The upper reaches of the Barle have favourable rapids which appeal to whitewater kayakers. The rapids are Graded at 2 (3-) which beginner to intermediate kayakers and canoeists paddle.

== See also ==
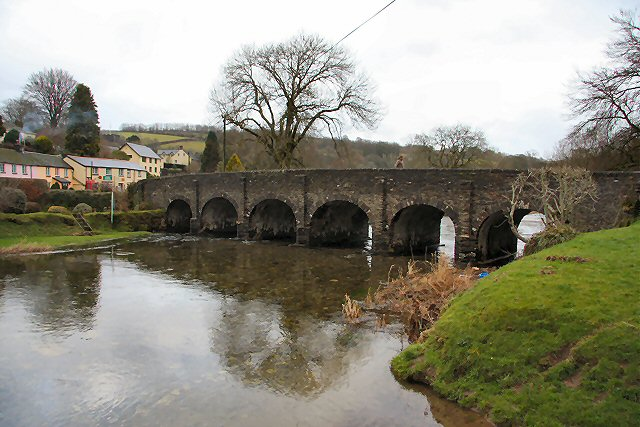
The bridge at Withypool.

- Rivers of the United Kingdom
