= Chains (geological site) =

North-west plateau of Somerset, England

Coordinates: 51°10′N 3°48′W

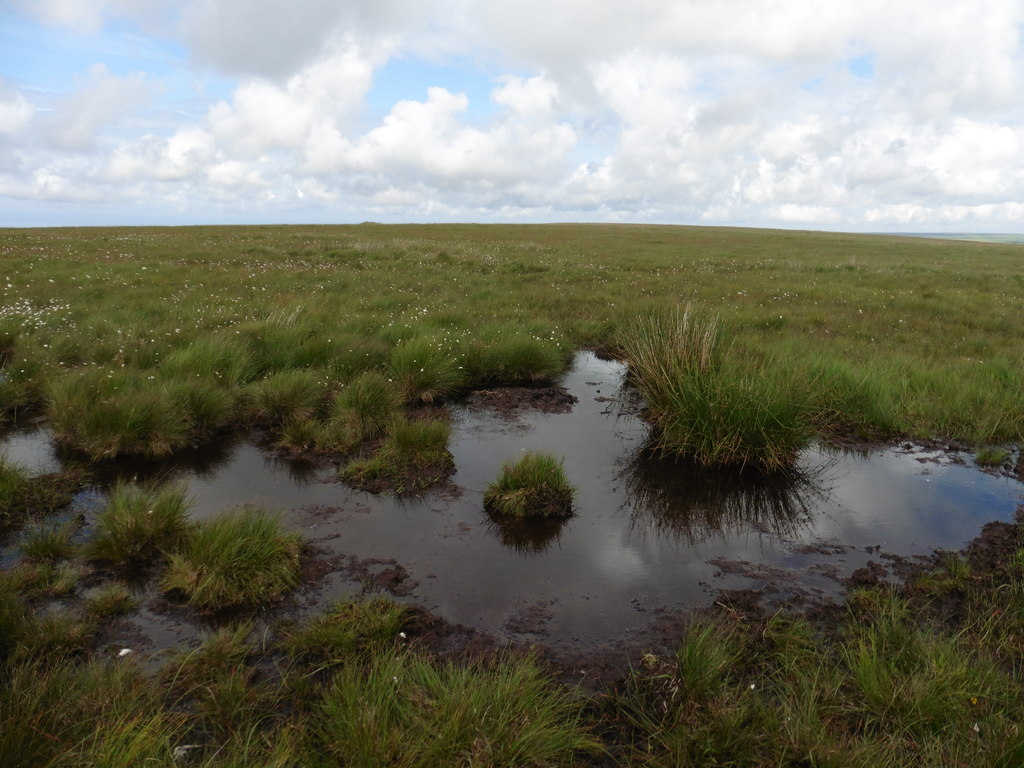
A small pond on The Chains

The Chains is the name given to the north-west plateau of Exmoor, Somerset, England. This plateau lies above the 1,500 feet (457 m) contour line, and includes the source of the River Barle.

It lies roughly within a triangle of land between Simonsbath, Challacombe and Lynton and has few distinguishing features. The highest point is at Chains Barrow - 1,599 feet (487 m).

It is a Geological Conservation Review site, recognised as being nationally important for its south-western lowland heath communities and for transitions from ancient semi-natural woodland through upland heath to blanket mire. The Chains provides a palynological record of a mid to late Flandrian vegetation history on Exmoor. The pollen sequence in the peat is calibrated by radiocarbon dating.

On the Chains above Simonsbath is a 3 acres (1.2 ha) reservoir known as Pinkery Pond. It was formed by John Knight and his son in the 19th century by damming the River Barle. The pond was originally intended to be 7 acres (2.8 ha). Its purpose is unknown though likely to be part of a failed irrigation scheme. Close to the pond are the remains of a small canal which would support the irrigation theory.

Long Chains Combe is the site of several standing stones which have been designated as scheduled monuments.
