= Barle Valley =

Protected area in Somerset, England

- Site of Special Scientific Interest
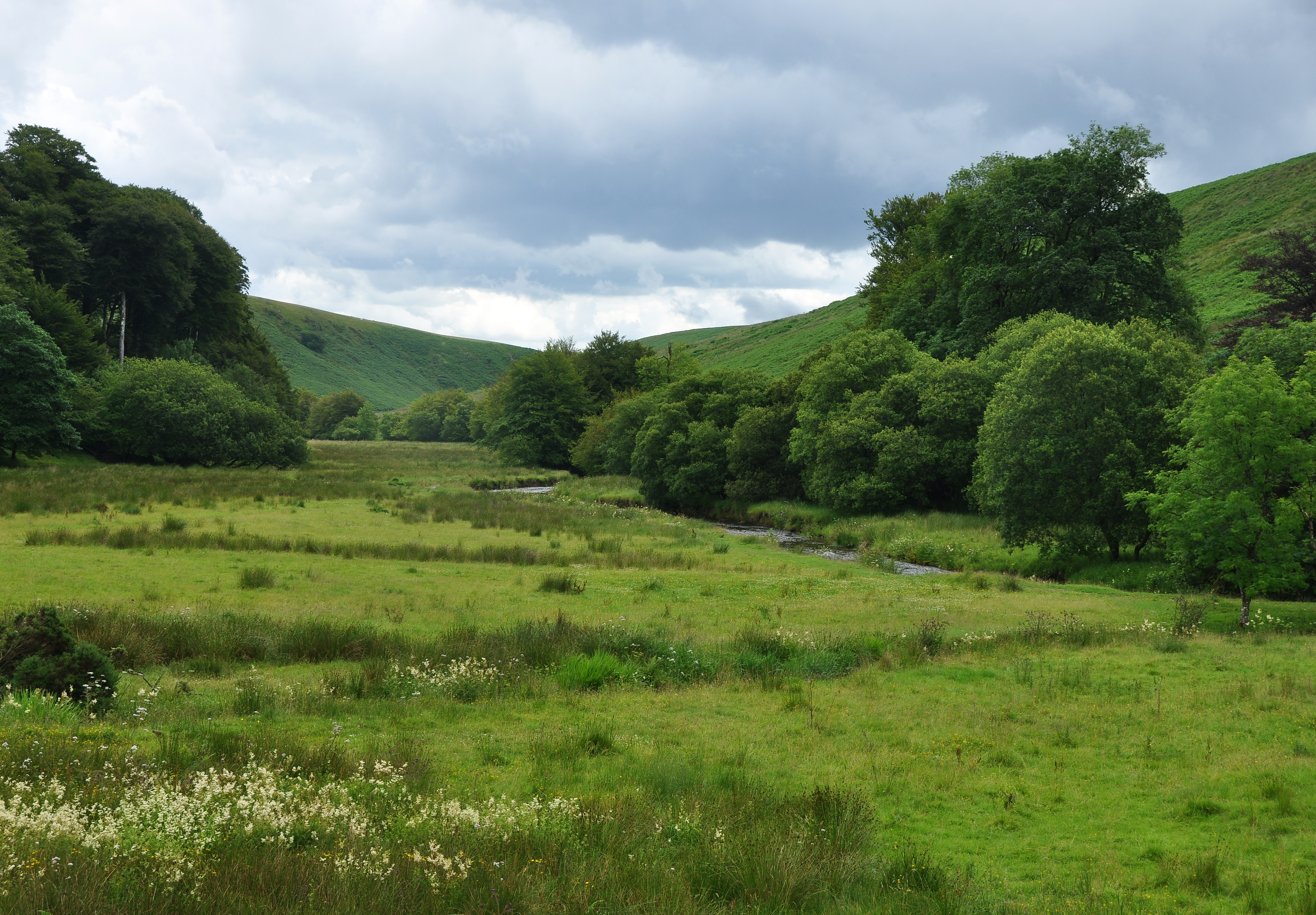
- Barle Valley at Simonsbath

- Location within Somerset
- Location of Barle Valley.
- Area of search: Somerset and Devon
- Grid reference: SS723423
- Coordinates: 51.16565°N 3.82778°W
- Interest: Biological
- Area: 1,539.2 acres (6.229 km^{2}; 2.4050 sq mi)
- Notification date: 1988

Barle Valley is a 1,540 acres (620 ha) Site of Special Scientific Interest within Exmoor National Park, situated in the counties of Devon and Somerset through which the River Barle flows. It was notified in its current form under the Wildlife and Countryside Act in 1988. The site includes the Somerset Wildlife Trust's Mounsey Wood Nature Reserve and the Knaplock and North Barton SSSI which has been notified since 1954.

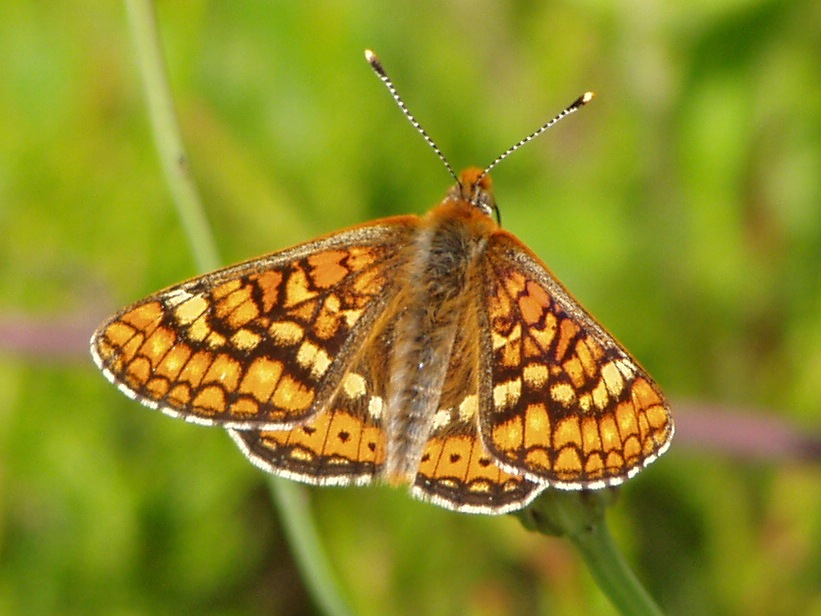
Marsh fritillary

== Plantlife ==
The Barle Valley, which consists of steep sandstone slopes with acidic soils, contains large areas of ancient upland of Sessile Oak woodland. This woodland is present between 500 feet (150 m) and 1,000 feet (300 m) on the valley-side. Over Eighty-five different types of vascular plant species have been recorded in the area, including thirty-one ancient woodland indicators. As well, it features areas of the valley mire, heathland and acidic grassland. These meadows are biodiverse with one of the few sites of great burnet in Exmoor. The mires are fed by springs which flow from the base of the sandstone slopes and are dominated by moss carpets due to their low-nutrient environment. In the woodland areas, there is an abundance of lichens, with one hundred and sixty-five populations of epiphytic lichens are present, many of which are from rare species. Due to a large amount of ancient woodland indicators in Barle it gives it a very high index of ecological continuity.

== Birds ==
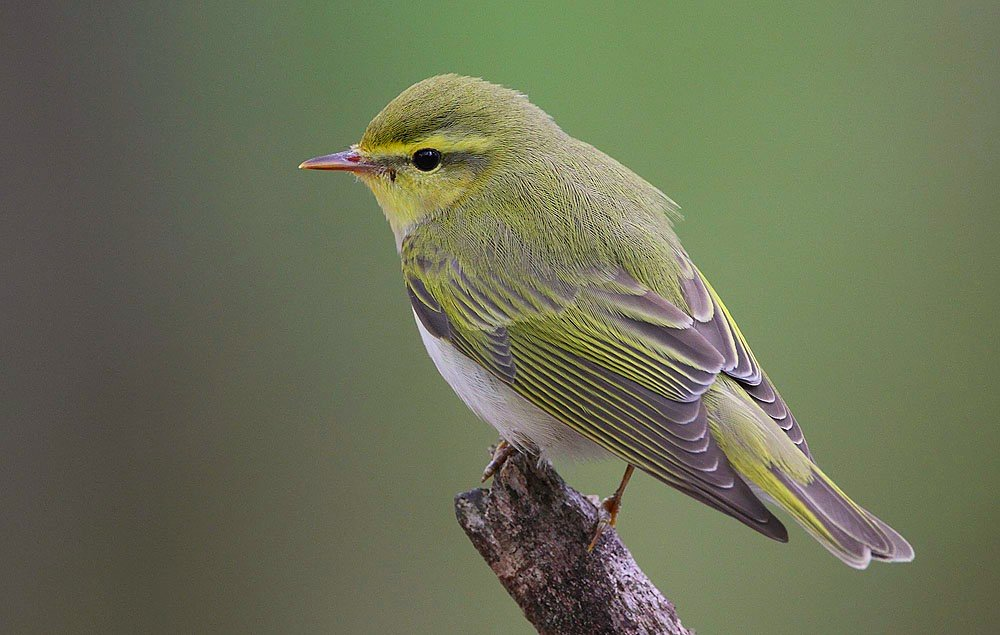
Wood warbler

The site contains a wide variety of woodland breeding birds including particularly high densities of redstart (Phoenicurus phoenicurus), wood warbler (Phylloscopus sibilatrix) and pied flycatcher (Ficedula hypoleuca). These are all summer migrants.

The River Barle provides an important habitat for kingfisher (Alcedo atthis), dipper (Cinclus cinclus) and grey wagtail (Motacilla cinerea), while scrub and heath have breeding stonechat (Saxicola torquata) and whinchat (Saxicola rubetra).

== Other species ==
In the valley over twenty different species of butterfly have been recorded including the nationally scarce marsh fritillary (Eurodryas aurinia) and vulnerable high brown fritillary (Argynnis adippe). Both roe deer (Capreolus capreolus) and red deer (Cervus elaphus) graze in the pastures. Also, otters (Lutra lutra) have been recorded on Barle. A colony of dormice (Muscardinus avellanarius) inhabits at least one of the hazel coppices.
