= Henry Clutton =

English architect (1819 - 1893)

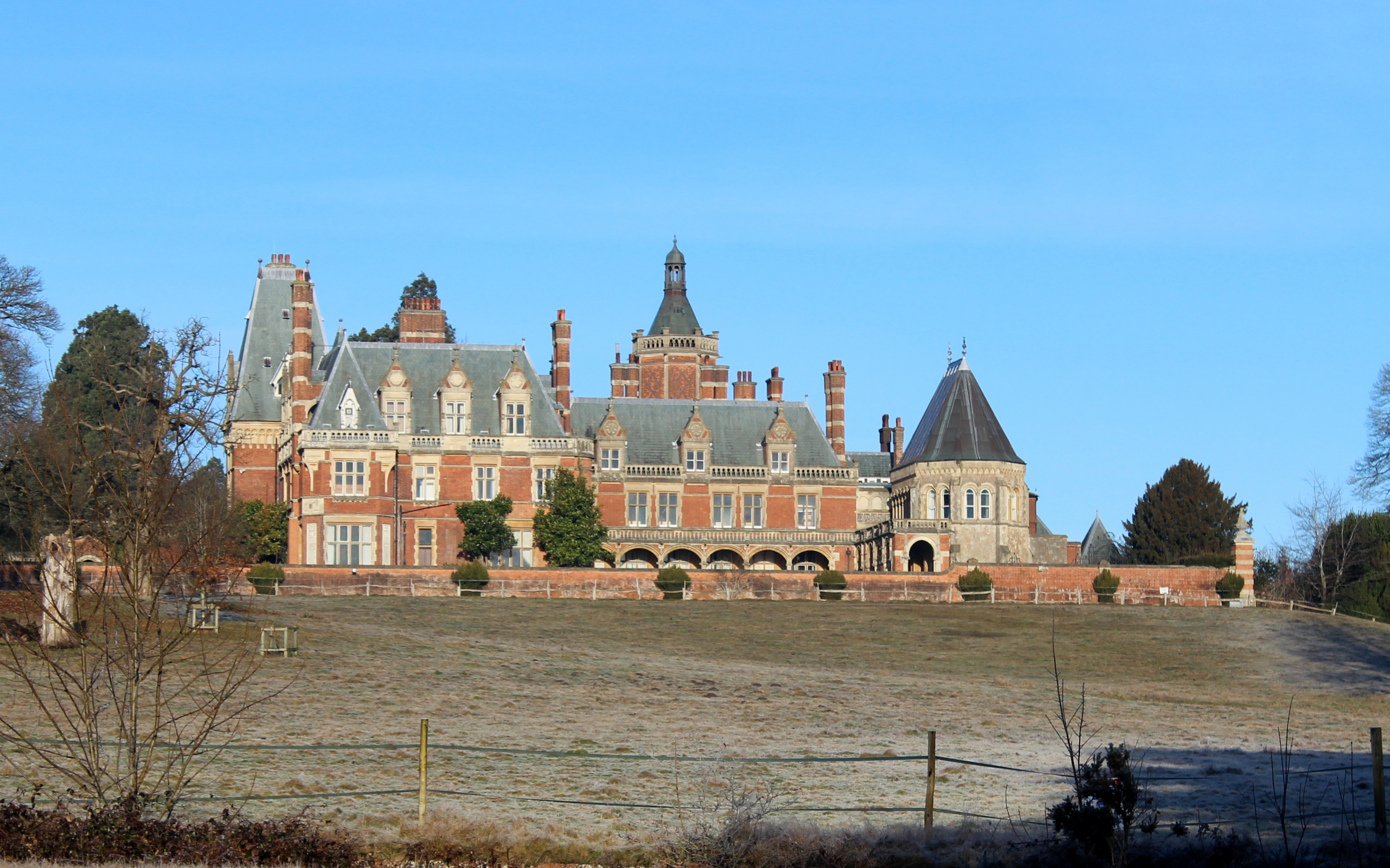
Minley Manor (1858–1860)

Henry Clutton (19 March 1819 – 27 June 1893) was an English architect and designer.

== Life ==
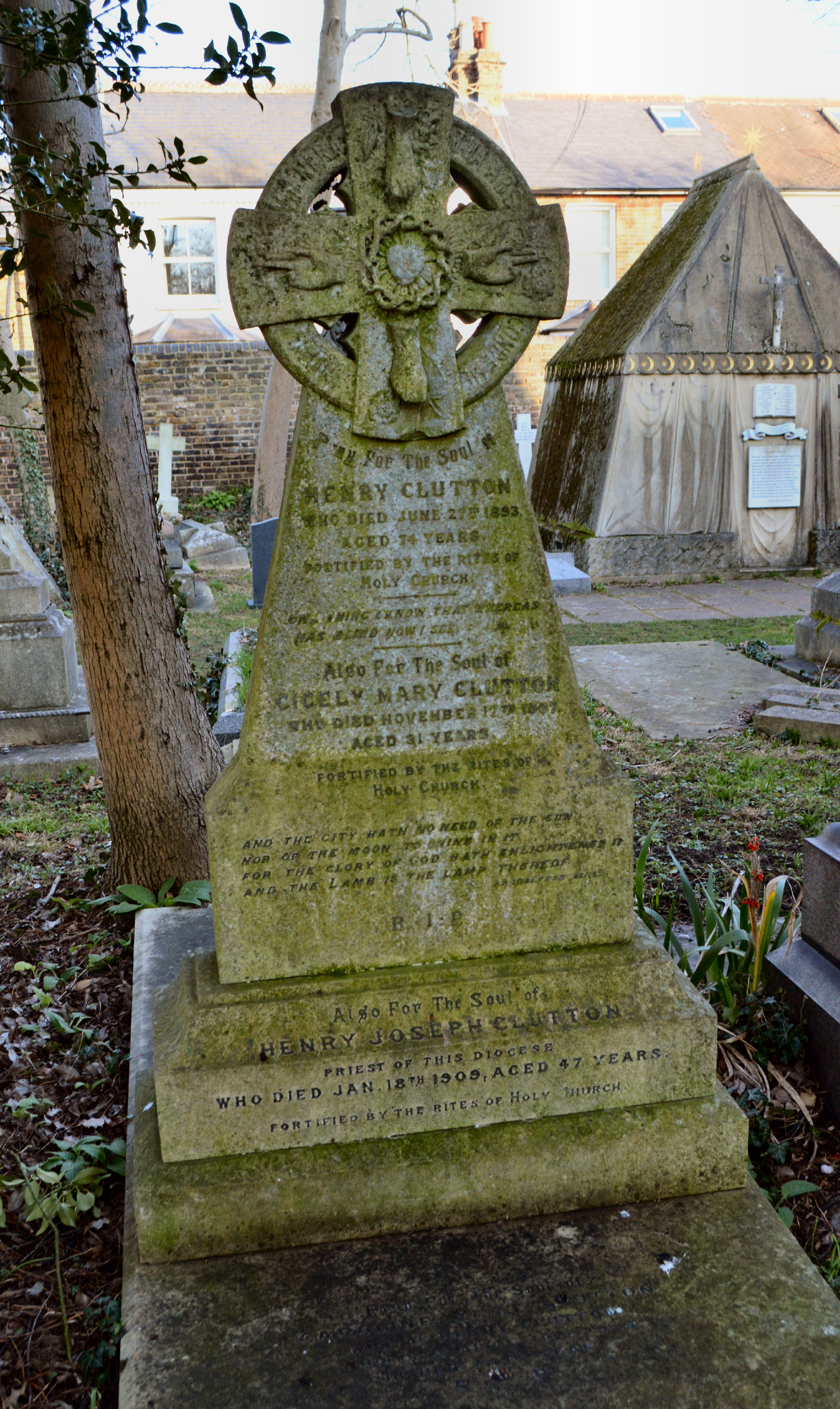
St Mary Magdalen, Mortlake

He was born on 19 March 1819 the son of Owen Clutton (1775–1845), a corn factor, and his second wife Elizabeth Amelia Goodinge (1782–1848). He was baptised at St Mary’s Church, Newington in Surrey. He met his future wife at the home of Dr and Mrs Fincham in the summer of 1858. Henry offered Caroline Alice Ryder (1840-1934) and her father a ride home in his carriage. He asked her to marry him. As she was only 18 her father asked them to wait until she was 20. On 17 October 1860 they married and had the following children:

- Henry (Harry) Joseph Clutton (1861–1909)
- Francis (Frank) Owen Clutton (1862–1923)
- Katherine Mary Clutton (1864–1955)
- Alice Mary Clutton RSCJ (1866–1954)
- Roger Bernard Clutton SJ (1870–1945)
- Captain Ralph Philip Clutton R.N. (1872–1942)
- Margaret Mary Clutton RSCJ (1874–1964)
- Cecily Mary Clutton (1876–1907)
- Beatrice Mary Clutton (1878–1955)

He died on 27 June 1893 at Brookside, Yiewsley, West Drayton, Middlesex at the house of his brother John where he was staying. He was buried in the churchyard of St Mary Magdalen, Mortlake. He left an estate valued at £98,400 (equivalent to £10,932,277 in 2025).

== Career ==
Cliveden House Clock Tower (1861)

He studied with Edward Blore between 1835 and 1840, but began his own practice in 1844. He became an expert in French medieval architecture. Clutton also worked with William Burges. John Francis Bentley was a student of Clutton.

In 1855, Clutton and Burges won the competition to design Lille Cathedral; however, the idea of entrusting the construction of a church in honour of the Virgin to foreign architects of an Anglican confession raised objections. Therefore, the project was given to a local architect.

Between 1858 and 1860, Clutton built Minley Manor in the French chateau style for Raikes Currie, a partner in Glyn Mills' Bank and a member of the Currie family who benefited substantially from slavery in the British West Indies. It was later used by the Royal School of Military Engineering.

After Cliveden House burned down for the second time, around 1859, George Sutherland-Leveson-Gower, 2nd Duke of Sutherland commissioned Clutton to design a nearby water tower. The 100-foot (30m) clock tower was added in 1861 and still provides water for the house today. It is rendered in Roman cement like the rest of the house, and features four clock faces framed by gilded surrounds and a half-open staircase on its north side. It was described by the architectural critic Nicholas Pevsner as "the epitome of Victorian flamboyance and assertiveness."

In 1865, William Duke of Bedford, decided to build a Chapel of Ease linked to the Anglican parish church of St. Eustacius, Tavistock, Devon. This chapel was to accommodate the miners pouring into Tavistock to work at the Great Consoles copper mines to the west of Tavistock. After the mines were worked out, the need for this church diminished and it closed. In 1953 the Catholic Diocese of Plymouth purchased the church and it is now the parish church of Our Lady of the Assumption and St. Mary Magdalene.

== Works ==
- Illustrations of Medieval Architecture in France, from the Accession of Charles VI. to the Demise of Louis XII: With Historical and Professional Remarks

== Buildings ==
1840s

- Merevale Hall, Atherstone, Warwickshire 1842-44 (completion of original house by Edward Blore)
- St Mary's Church, Ewell, Surrey 1847–48
- South Wales Training College, Carmarthen 1848
- St Nicholas Church, Baddesley Ensor, Warwickshire 1848
- Gatehouse, Merevale Lane, Merevale, Warwickshire 1848-49
- Coach House, Merevale Lane, Merevale, Warwickshire 1848-49
- Frankleigh House, Bradford-on-Avon 1849
- St John’s Church, Church Road, Harrow, Greater London 1849

1850s

- Hatherop Castle, Gloucestershire 1850–56
- Houghton Hall, Houghton Regis, Bedfordshire, c. 1851: overhaul of the mansion
- Church School, Dunstall, Staffordshire 1852-53
- St Mary’s Church, Dunstall, Staffordshire 1852-53
- Ruthin Castle, Ruthin, Wales 1853
- St Mary's Church, Steeple Ashton, Wiltshire, 1853: rebuilding of chancel
- Wrotham Park, Hertfordshire ca. 1854 (wings extended, colonnade and portico added to E for General John Byng, 1st Earl of Strafford)
- School and School House, Warrenne Way, Reigate, Surrey 1854
- St Nicholas Church, Hatherop, Gloucestershire 1854-55
- St Luke's Church, Simonsbath, Exmoor, Somerset 1855–56
- Queen's Free Grammar School, Basingstoke 1855
- Balcombe Place, Haywards Heath Road, Balcombe, West Sussex 1856(for John Hankey of Haylands)
- Anglican Chapel, Dorking Cemetery, Surrey 1856
- St Francis Xavier's Schools, Salisbury Street, Liverpool 1856
- Welsh School, Church Road, Spelthorne, Surrey 1857
- Chapel at Welsh School, Church Road, Spelthorne, Surrey 1857
- Husborne Crawley Lower School and Schoolhouse, School Lane, Husborne Crawley, Bedfordshire 1857
- Battle Abbey, Sussex 1857
- North West Lodge, Balcombe Place, West Sussex 1858
- South West Lodge, Balcombe Place, West Sussex 1858
- St Lawrence’s Church ,Steppingley, Bedfordshire 1858-60
- Minley Manor, Minley Road, Blackwater, Hampshire 1858-60
- Our Lady of Good Counsel Roman Catholic Church, Hertford 1858-59
- St Mary of the Isle Church, Douglas, Isle of Man, 1859
- Pepperhill Farmhouse and Pepperhill Cottage with attached former dairy, Over Stowey, Somerset 1859 (for Henry Labouchere, 1st Baron Taunton)
- St Francis of Assisi Church, Notting Hill, London 1859–60 (with John Francis Bentley)
- Quantock Lodge, Somerset 1859-60s

1860s

- Moorhouse Chantry Chapel, Nottinghamshire, 1860
- Romanesque cloister at the Birmingham Oratory, 1860
- St Michael the Archangel Church, Chatham, Kent 1862–63
- Hoar Cross Hall, Staffordshire, 1862–71
- St Peter's Church, Leamington Spa, Warwickshire 1862-64 and Presbytery 1861-66
- St Oswald's Church, Malpas 1863 (restoration)
- Our Lady of Sion Convent, Crescent Road, Worthing 1864
- St Mary of the Angels, Worthing, West Sussex, 1864
- Our Lady of the Assumption and St. Mary Magdalene, Tavistock, Devon 1865
- St Mary's Church, Woburn, Bedfordshire 1865–1868
- Welcombe Hotel, Stratford upon Avon, Warwickshire 1866–69
- St Michael's Church, Aspley Heath, Bedfordshire, 1868

1870s

- Steppingley County Primary School, Church Road, Steppingley, Bedfordshire 1870
- The Sandy Lodge, Bedfordshire 1870
- Grosvenor House, remodelling, 1870–72 and 1880–81
- Board School, Great North Road, Stibbington, Cambridgeshire 1871-72
- St Mary’s Church, Stevington, Bedfordshire 1871 (restoration)
- St Andrew’s Church, Minley Road, Blackwater, Hampshire 1871
- Sacred Heart Church, Bournemouth 1872–75
- Widmerpool Hall, Nottinghamshire 1872
- Holy Name Presbytery, 8 Portsmouth Street, Manchester 1874
- Old Warden Lower School, High Street, Old Warden, Bedfordshire 1874-75
- Ickwell Lodge, Warden Road, Old Warden, Bedfordshire 1874
- Main Lodge, High Street, Old Warden, Bedfordshire 1874
- St Mary's Church chapel for the tomb of Napoleon III, Chislehurst 1874
- Mansion House, Old Warden Park, Bedfordshire for Joseph Shuttleworth (of Clayton & Shuttleworth)1875-76
- Melchet Court, St Edwards School, Melchet Park, Surrey 1875-79 (rebuilt after fire)
- Mount St Mary's College, Derbyshire, 1876
- St Michael's Church, Ditton, Cheshire 1876–1879
- The Piazza, 1-8 Bedford Chambers and 33 James Street, Covent Garden, London 1877-79
- Church of Our Lady of Consolation and St Stephen, Forestry Track 34, West Tofts Road, Lynford, Norfolk, 1878

1880s

- Cemetery Chapel and Gatehouse, Tavistock 1880
- St. Philip's School, Birmingham 1887

== Gallery ==
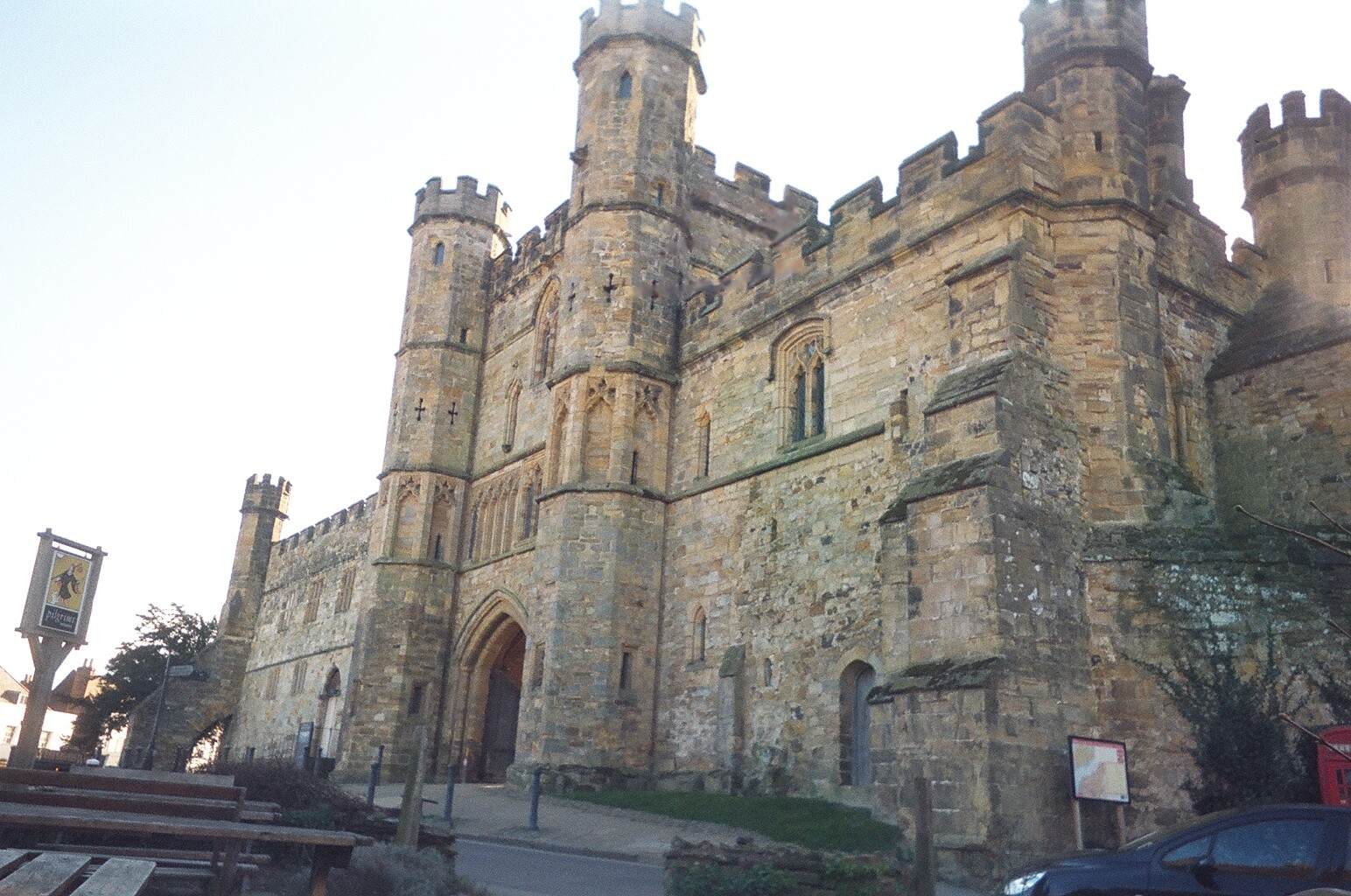
Battle Abbey

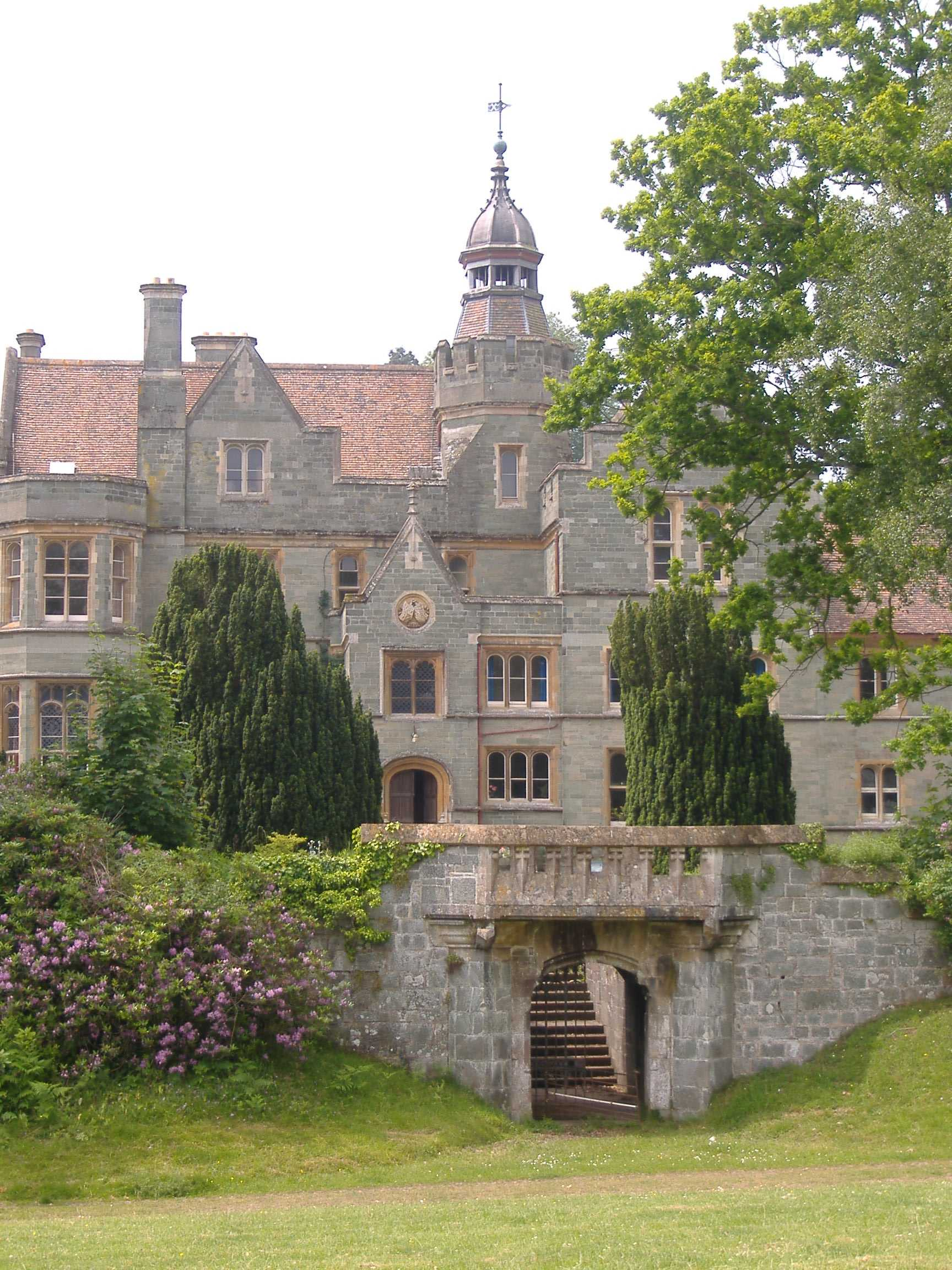
Quantock Lodge

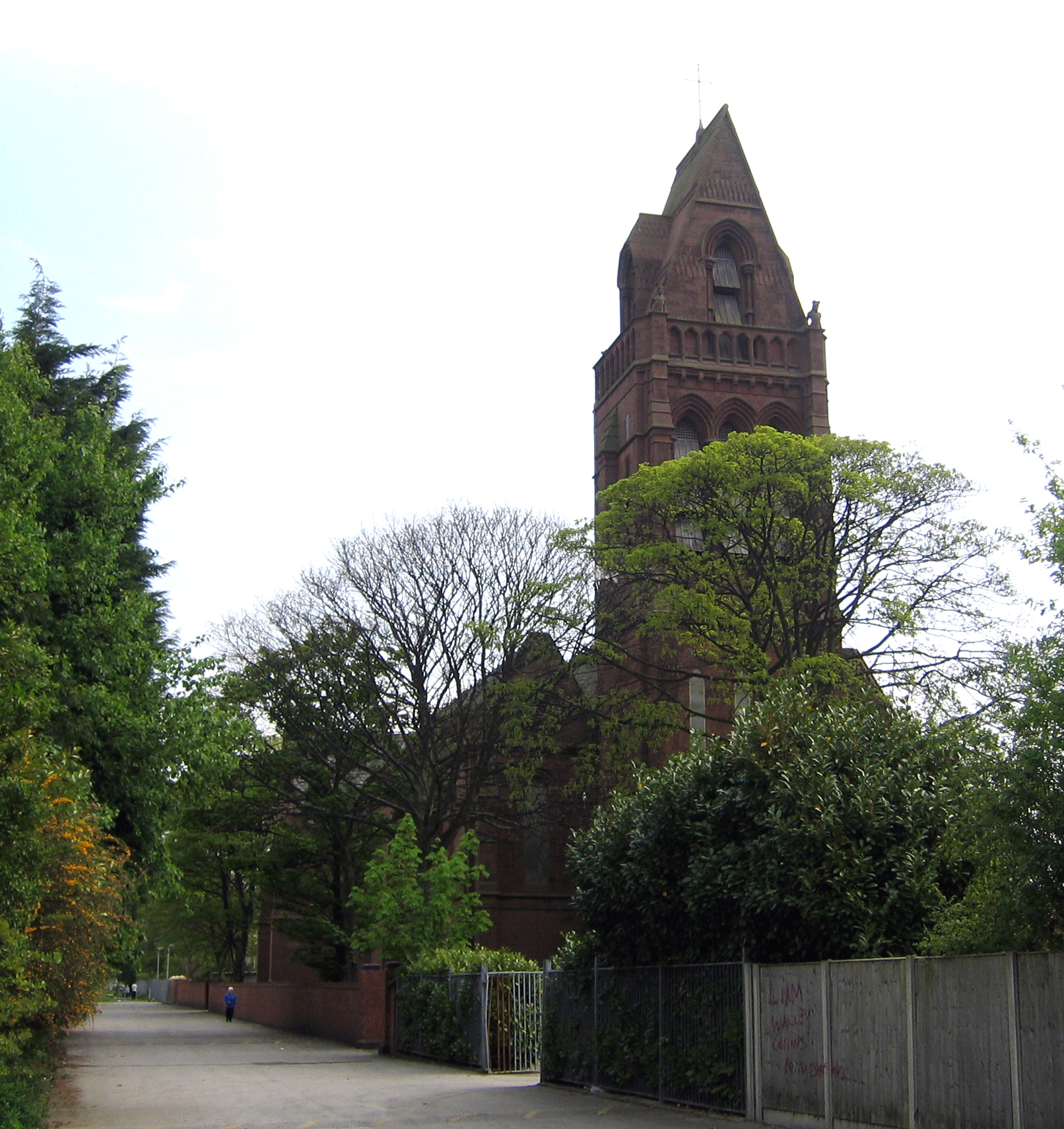
St Michael's Church, Ditton

St Mary's Church, Ewell

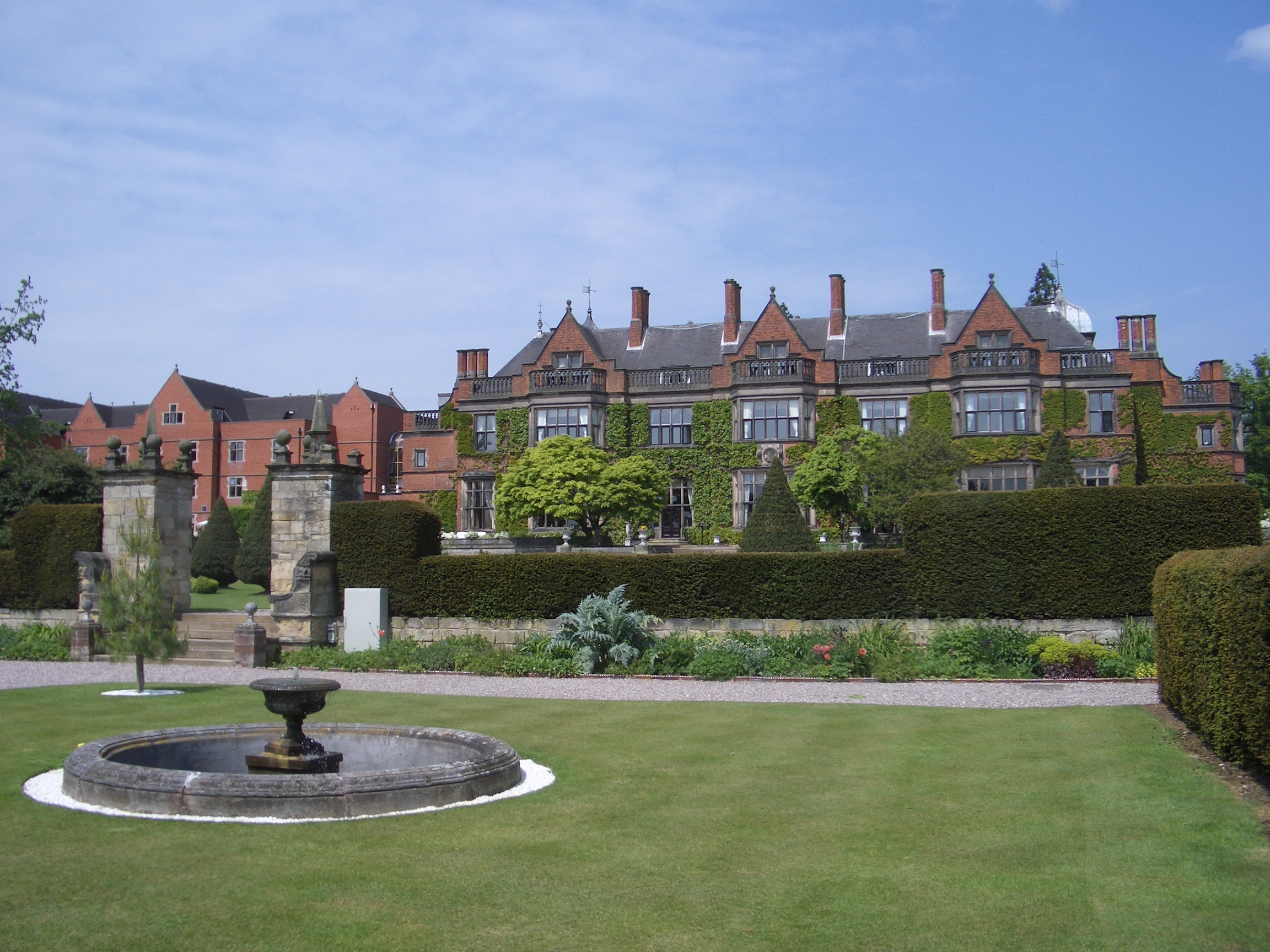
Hoar Cross Hall

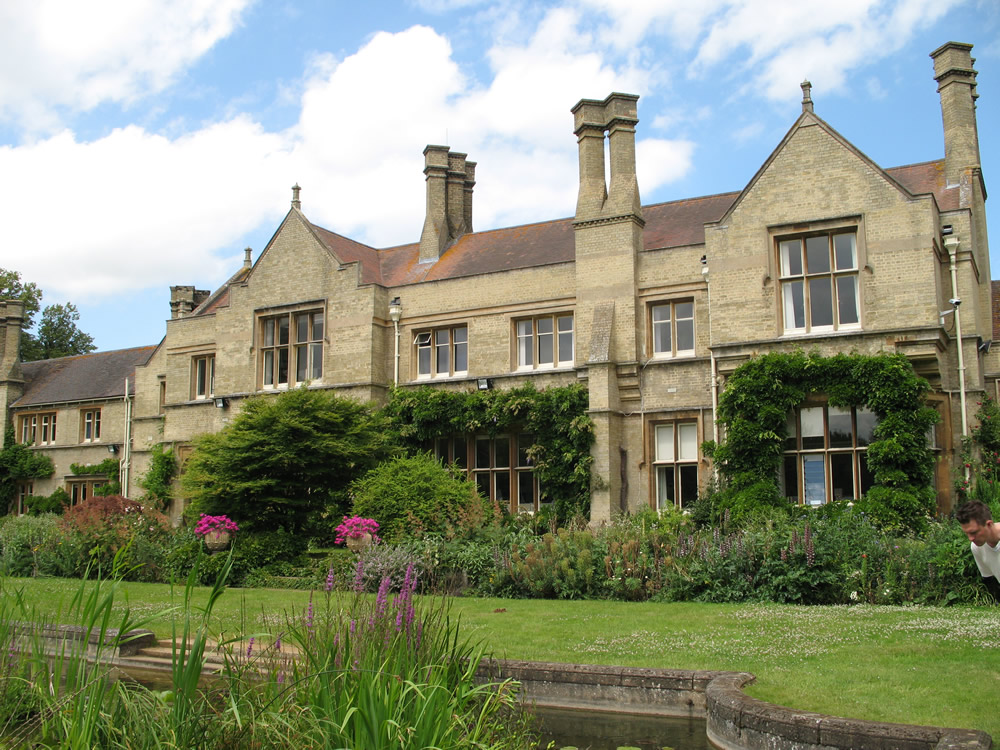
The Sandy Lodge
