= Jim McCarthy =

Jim McCarthy may refer to:

- Jim McCarthy (businessman) (born 1956), British CEO of Poundland
- Jim McCarthy (comics), British comics creator and music journalist
- Jim McCarthy (rugby union) (1924–2015), Irish union player for Munster, the national team, and the Lions
- Jim McCarthy (author), author and keynote speaker
- Jim McCarthy (hurler) (died 1982), Irish hurler
- Jim McCarthy (American football) (1920–1991), American football end
- Jim McCarthy, CEO and co-founder of web ticket seller Goldstar
- Jim McCarthy, singer-songwriter, member of The Godz
- Jim McCarthy, character in the 2010 film All Good Things

== See also ==
- Jimmy MacCarthy (born 1953), Irish singer-songwriter
- James McCarthy (disambiguation)
- Jim McCarty
