= James McCarthy =

James McCarthy may refer to:

- James McCarthy (bishop) (1853–1943), Bishop of Galloway, Scotland
- James McCarthy (footballer) (born 1990), Ireland international footballer
- James McCarthy (Gaelic footballer) (born 1990), player for Dublin and Ballymun Kickhams
- James McCarthy (oceanographer) (1944–2019), Harvard professor of biological oceanography
- James McCarthy (rugby union), (born 1999), Welsh rugby union player
- James McCarthy (sociologist) (born 1949), president of Suffolk University in Boston, Massachusetts
- James McCarthy (surveyor) (1853–1919), Irish surveyor who mapped the boundaries of Siam in the 19th century
- James F. McCarthy (coach), American college football coach
- James Francis McCarthy (born 1942), American Roman Catholic bishop
- James P. McCarthy (born 1935), U.S. Air Force general
- James William McCarthy (1872–1939), U.S. federal judge
- James Joseph McCarthy (1817–1882), Irish architect
- Babe McCarthy (James H. McCarthy, 1923–1975), American basketball coach
- Sir James McCarthy (died 1824), governor of Cape Coast Castle in West Africa
- James McCarthy, villain of the Sherlock Holmes story The Boscombe Valley Mystery

== See also ==
- James MacCarthy (1945–2019), Irish artist
- Jim McCarthy (disambiguation)
