= St Luke's Church, Simonsbath =

Church in Somerset, England

St Luke's Church
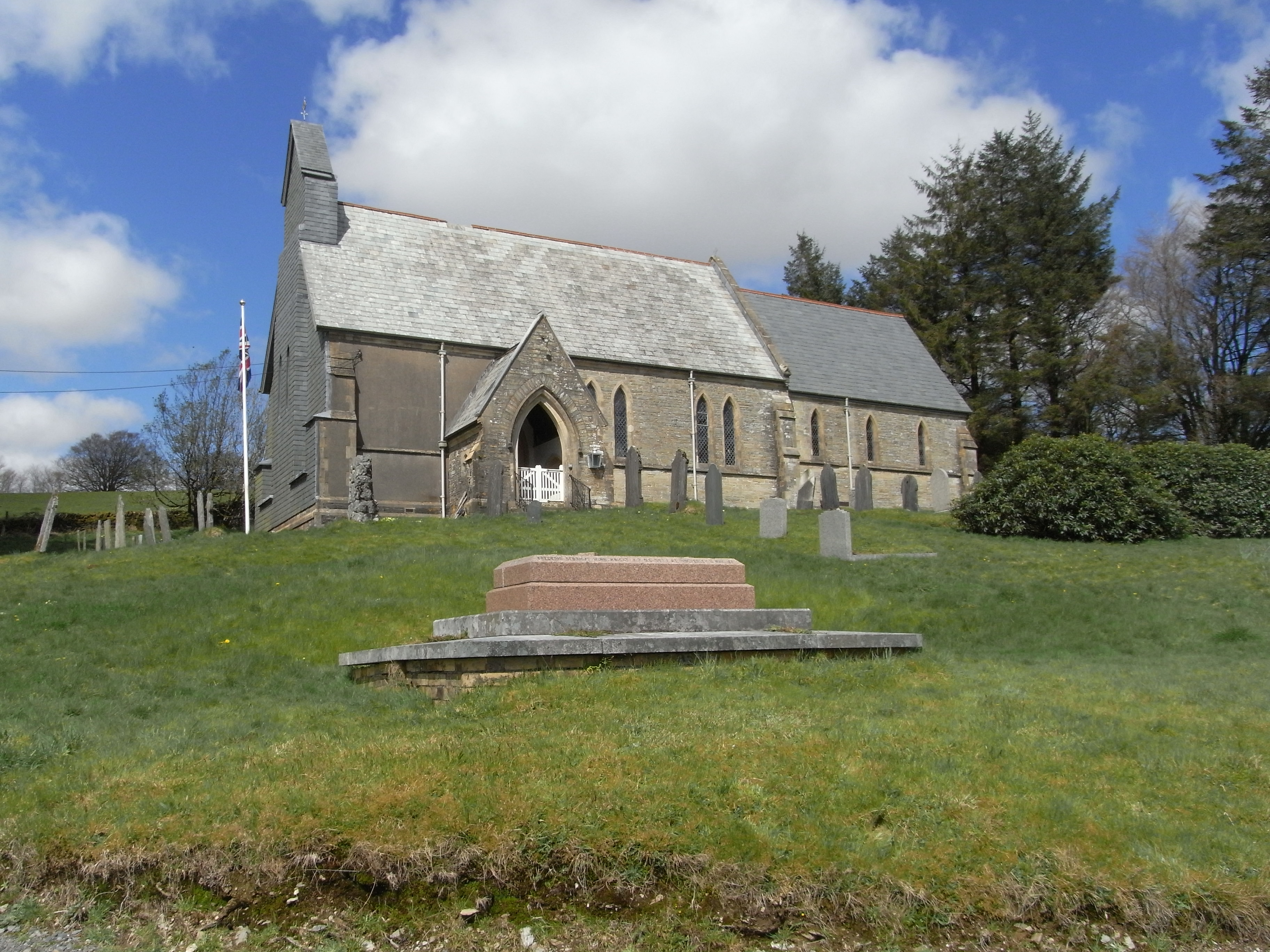
- St Luke's Church

Religion
- Affiliation: Church of England
- Ecclesiastical or organizational status: Active
- Year consecrated: 1856

Location
- Location: Simonsbath, Exmoor, Somerset, England
- Interactive map of St Luke's Church
- Coordinates: 51.1410°N 3.7513°W

Architecture
- Architect: Henry Clutton
- Type: Church

St Luke's Church is a Church of England church in Simonsbath, Exmoor, Somerset, England. The church, which was designed by Henry Clutton and built in 1855–56, has been a Grade II listed building since 1959. In addition to being a place of worship, today the church is also used to hold concerts and other events. It is the venue of the annual Simonsbath Festival.

== History ==
The small settlement of Simonsbath was established after Exmoor was purchased by John Knight from the Commissioners of Woods and Forests in 1818. As the population grew in relation to increased local agricultural work and mining operations, eighteen residents of the estate put forward a petition in 1845 calling for a church to be built. At the time, the nearest church was the parish church at Exford, approximately six miles from Simonsbath. St Luke's was built by the order of the Commissioners of Woods and Forests, at a time when the estate was owned by Frederick Knight, who inherited it from his father in 1850.

In 1818, as part of the Inclosure Act 1773, a 12-acre plot of land was reserved by the Crown for the construction of a church if future development of Exmoor required a place of worship for its inhabitants. An inspection of the proposed site was carried out by two Commissioners in May 1853 and plans for the church drawn up by Henry Clutton. The Commissioners of Woods and Forests also provided a grant of £1,815 towards the construction of the church and parsonage.

Preliminary works began in May 1855 when the contractor, Mr. Amos Hole of Kingsbrompton, began preparing the site. However, owing to the low tender the builder had submitted to win the contract, Hole soon declared bankruptcy over its construction, with a debt of £587 owed to various local tradesmen. The contract then passed on to another local builder, John How, who also erected the parsonage.

The completed church was consecrated by the Bishop of Bath and Wells, Rev. Robert Eden, 3rd Baron Auckland, on 18 October 1856, who attended with the Chancellor of the Diocese and other local members of the clergy, including those of surrounding parishes. A local Wesleyan choir performed at the ceremony. With the opening of the church, Exmoor became its own parish.

== Architecture ==
St Luke's is built of local Blue Lias, with Bath stone dressings and a slate roof, in an Early English style. The bellcote at the western end of the church contains one bell. The interior is made up of a three-bay nave, chancel, south porch and vestry. The floor is laid with tessellated tiles, while the open roof, seats, pulpit and reading desk are all oak-stained. A stained glass window was later added to the church in remembrance of the local men killed in World War I.
