= Bozo bit =

Term with multiple meanings

The term bozo bit has been used in two contexts. Initially a weak copy protection system in the 1980s Apple classic Mac OS, the term "flipping the bozo bit" was later reused to describe a decision to ignore a person's input. It is possibly derived from the classic children's comedy character, Bozo the Clown.

== Weak copy protection ==
In early versions of Apple's classic Mac OS, the "bozo bit" (also called the "no copy" flag in some documentation) was one of the flags in the Finder Information Record, which described various file attributes. When the bit was set, the file could not be copied. It was called the bozo bit because it was copy protection so weak that only a bozo would think of it, and only a bozo would be deterred by it. Version 5.0 of Finder began ignoring this bit.

The cassette and ROM filing systems and the Advanced Disc Filing System of Acorn MOS feature a rudimentary copy protection mechanism where a file with a certain flag set cannot be loaded except to execute it.

The Compact Disc and other digital audio media have a similar "no copy" bit in the subcode, used to implement the Serial Copy Management System, but nearly all disc-copying software ignores it, and usually removes it on copies. Consumer-grade dedicated hardware audio disc copiers are required by the Audio Home Recording Act to honor the bozo bit, and will refuse to copy a disc with the bit set. Professional disc copiers are exempt from this law, ignore the bozo bit, and will copy a protected disc.

== Dismissing a person as not worth listening to ==
In his 1995 book Dynamics of Software Development, which presented a series of rules about the political and interpersonal forces that drive software development, Jim McCarthy applied the bozo bit notion to the realm of human interaction.

In his book, McCarthy's rule #4 is "Don't Flip The Bozo Bit". His reasoning is that everyone has something to contribute – it's easy and tempting, when someone ticks a person off or is mistaken (or both), to simply disregard all their input in the future by setting the "bozo flag" to TRUE for that person. But by taking that lazy way out, the person poisons team interactions and cannot avail themselves of help from the "bozo" ever again.

== See also ==
- Bozo the Clown
- Evil bit
