= Simonsbath House =

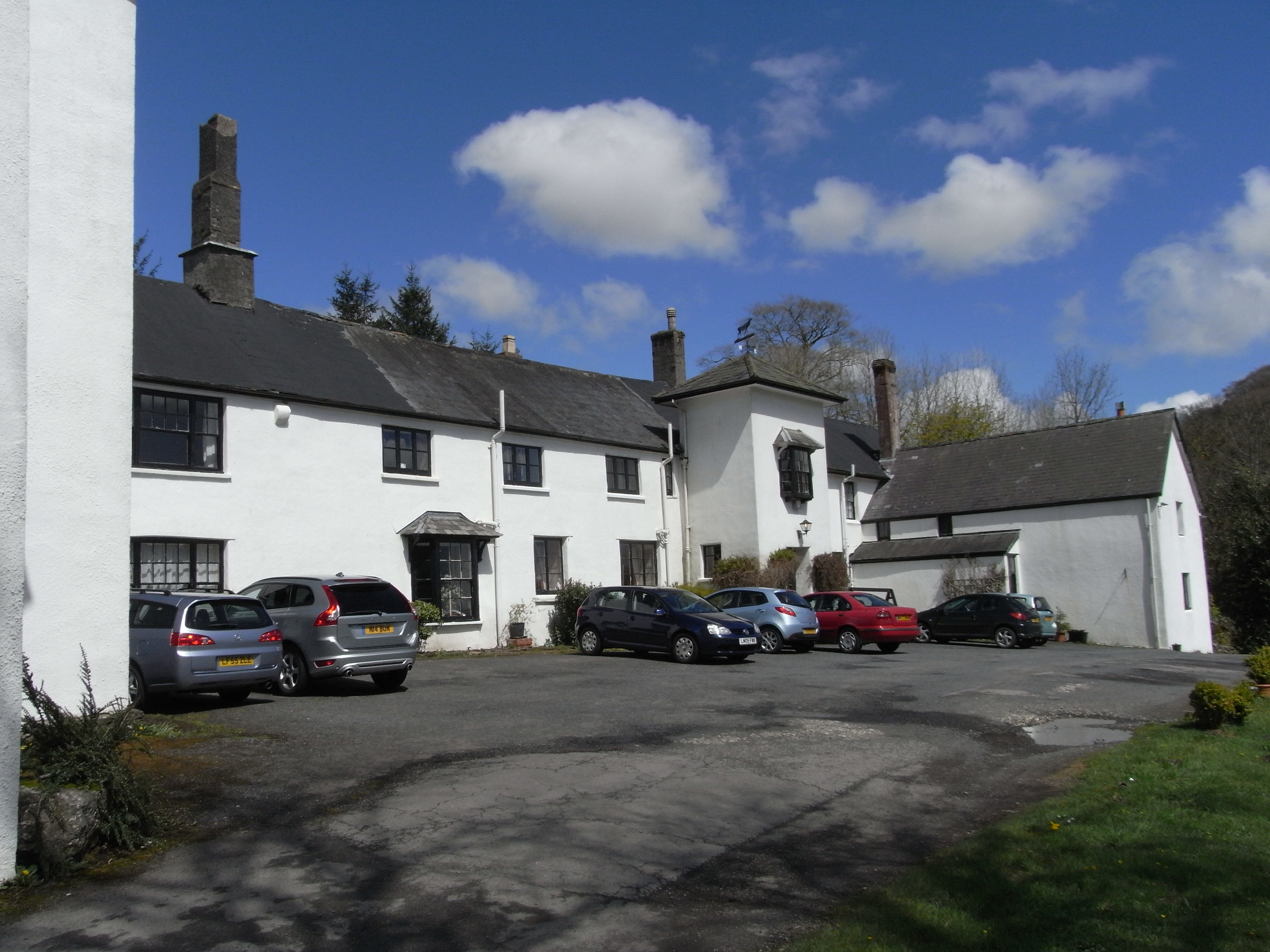

- Location within Somerset
- 51°08′21″N 3°45′24″W
- Location: Simonsbath, Somerset

History
- Built: Mid-17th century

Listed Building – Grade II
- Official name: Simonsbath House Hotel
- Designated: 6 April 1959
- Reference no.: 1058031

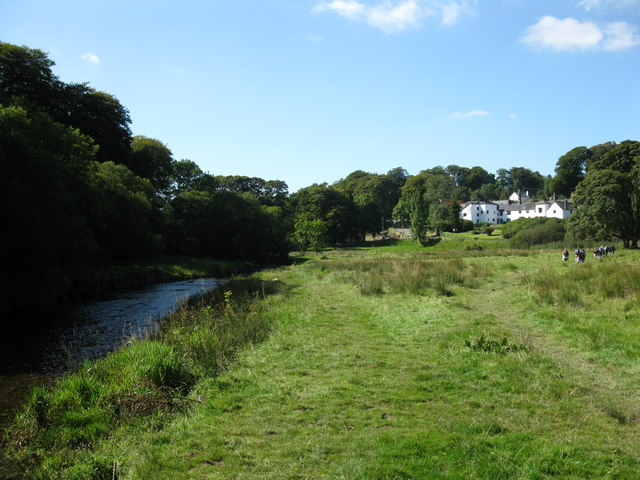
Setting of Simonsbath House in the valley of the River Barle, looking upstream

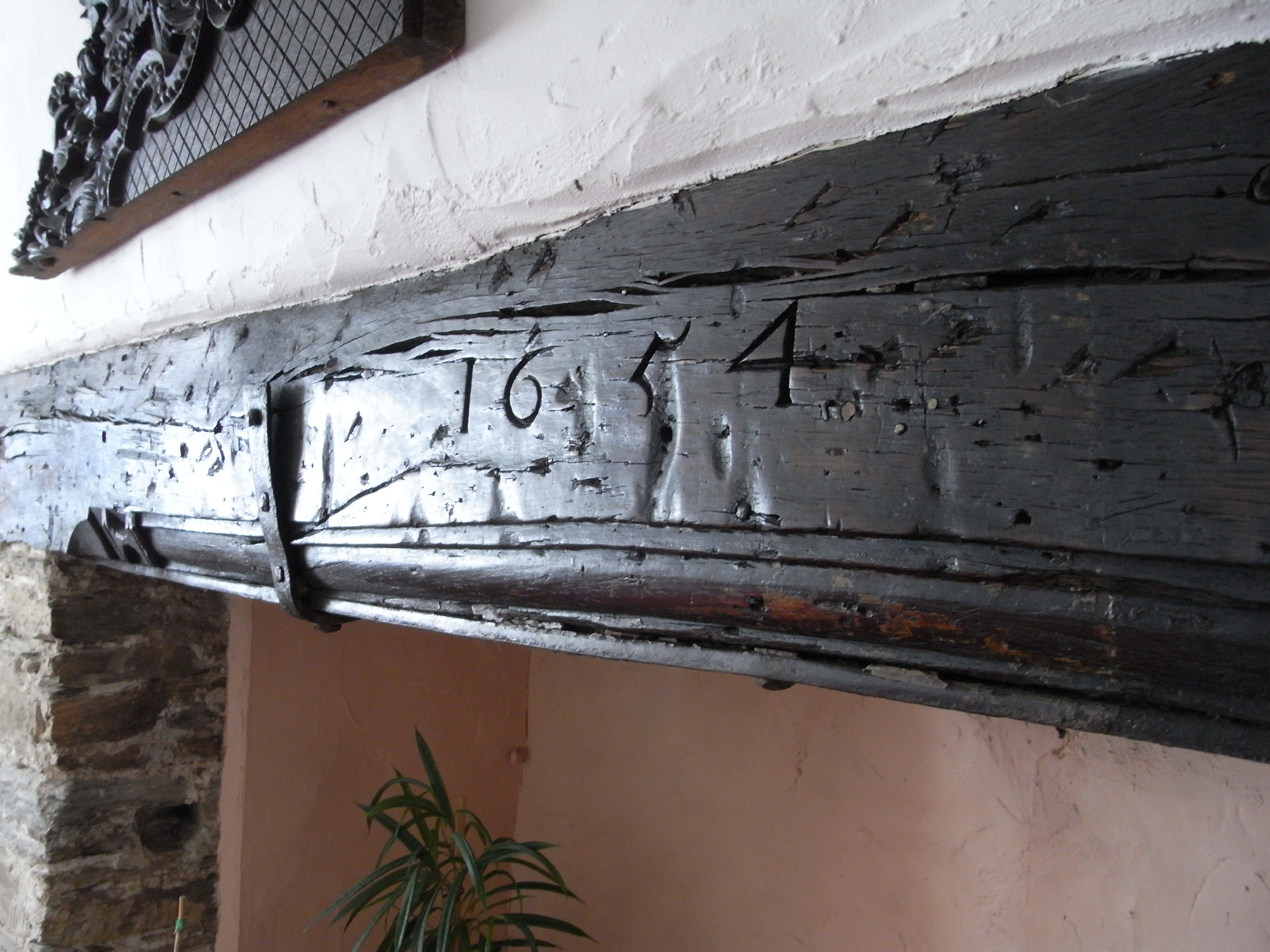
Lintel over fireplace of Old Kitchen, Simonsbath House, into which is carved the date "1654", taken to have been carved by James Boevey on completion of the building of the house

Simonsbath House is a historic house in Simonsbath on Exmoor in Somerset, England. The Grade II listed building is now the Simonsbath House Hotel, and outdoor activity centre. It lies in the valley of the River Barle and on the Two Moors Way footpath.

== History ==
The house was built in the mid-17th century by the merchant, lawyer and philosopher James Boevey (1622-1696), the warden of the royal forest of Exmoor, and for 150 years his was the only house in the forest. After the death of Boevey and his wife the house was sold with the Exmoor estate to Robert Siderfin of Luxborough. Siderfin used the grazing rights he gained on the estate but let the house to tenants; one of these was John Dennicombe, who allowed the house to fall into disrepair, and was eventually evicted, but only after he had burnt much of the wood panelling and other fixtures in the house. During the second half of the 18th century and the early part of the 19th century, the wardens of the forest were the Acland baronets who leased the house, and it was licensed as an inn.

After the Inclosure Acts the house was bought, with the accompanying farm and about 70,000 acres (280 km^{2}), the remaining portion of the former Royal Forest belonging to the Crown Estate, by John Knight of Worcestershire in 1818 for the sum of £50,000.

Knight set about converting the Royal Forest, now known as Exmoor National Park, into agricultural land. He and especially his son Frederick, who assumed management in 1841, erected most of the large farms in the central section of the moor and built 22 miles (35 km) of metalled access roads to Simonsbath. He built a 29 miles (47 km) wall around his estate, much of which still survives.

Shortly after 1879 Hugh Fortescue, 4th Earl Fortescue (1854–1932) of nearby Castle Hill, Filleigh in Devon, Master of the Devon and Somerset Staghounds 1880/81–87, acquired the reversion of the whole of the former Royal Forest of Exmoor after the death of Frederick Winn Knight. This was largely done to further his passion for staghunting. When Castle Hill was largely destroyed by a fire in 1934, the Fortescue family moved to Simonsbath House whilst rebuilding was in progress. The 4th Earl's granddaughter and eventual heiress, Lady Margaret Fortescue (1923-2013), devoted much time to attempting to put the Exmoor estate onto a profitable footing.

The house was altered by the Fortescues, including the building of one of the first squash courts in England in 1929. A 16th century heraldic chimney piece was brought by the Fortescues from their secondary seat at Weare Giffard Hall in Devon, and survives in today's hotel. During World War II the house was used as a school, and afterwards was as a hotel under the name "Diana Lodge Hotel" (in reference to the Roman goddess of hunting), which had several owners during the ensuing decades. In 1969 the name reverted to Simonsbath House.

== Architecture ==
The house, which consists of several bays, has white painted walls and slate roofs. Outside are several agricultural buildings which have been adapted to provide accommodation.

The interior includes a fireplace with a chamfered lintel which dates from 1654, panelling and a 17th-century overmantel with a painted coat of arms which was brought from Weare Giffard Hall, near Bideford, a secondary seat of the Earls Fortescue.

== Heraldic overmantel ==
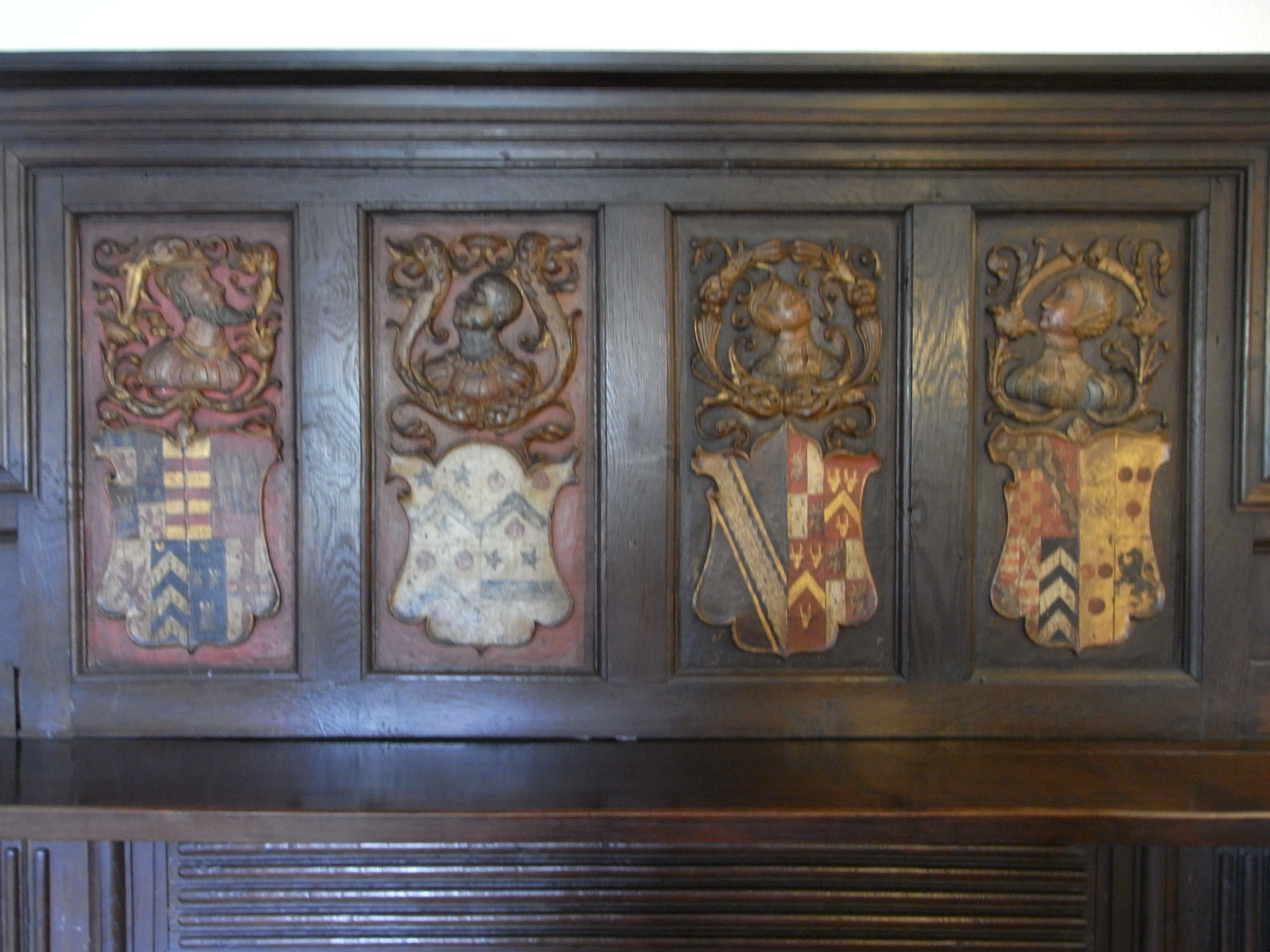
Fortescue family 17th-century heraldic overmantel from Wear Giffard Hall

Above the fireplace in the lounge of Simonsbath House is a late 16th-century heraldic overmantel relating to the Fortescue family and brought by them from Weare Giffard Hall, Devon. A framed handwritten explanatory note written c. 1900 by a member of the Fortescue family identifies the arms as follows, Shields from left to right:

- First shield: lower half, quarters from left to right: Bottreaux of Molland; Wise or Wyse of Ford, Devon; Sapcote or possibly Castelline of Dorset; Seamask rather than Punchardon or Bodenham of Bodenham Cottrell (written above this first shield is "Some of the coats in this shield appear also in 30 on the west wall of Wear Giffard Hall");
- Second shield from left: quarters: 1&4, Pollard of King's Nympton; 2&3, Pollard of Way or Horwood or Westcote.
- Third shield from left: the arms of Richard Fortescue(d.1570) of Filleigh, impaling the arms of his wife Joan Moreton: baron, Fortescue; femme, quarters 1&4, Morton of Kent, 2&3, Hagget of Kent.(These arms can be seen on monumental brasses of 1571 in Filleigh Church.)
- Fourth shield from left: the arms of Sir John Chichester (d.1569) of Raleigh (quarterly 1st: Chichester, 2nd: Raleigh, 3rd: 1st & 4th, Beaumont of Youlston, 2nd & 3rd Willington of Umberleigh, 4th: Wise of Sidenham ?) impaling the arms of his wife Gertrude Courtenay (d.1566) (quarterly 1st & 4th: Redvers, 2nd & 3rd: Courtenay). These arms are visible on Sir John Chichester's monument in Pilton church.

The 3rd and 4th shields thus represent (3rd): the father of Hugh Fortescue (1545-1600), Sheriff of Devon in 1585, who died at Weare Giffard, and (4th): the father of his wife Elizabeth Chichester. and suggest that the overmantel was made to his order between 1570, when he succeeded his father and his death in 1600. A modern heraldic overmantel also exists in the bar, showing 19th century Fortescue family arms.
