= St Philip's School =

Grammar school in Birmingham, West Midlands, England

St Philip's Grammar School for Boys
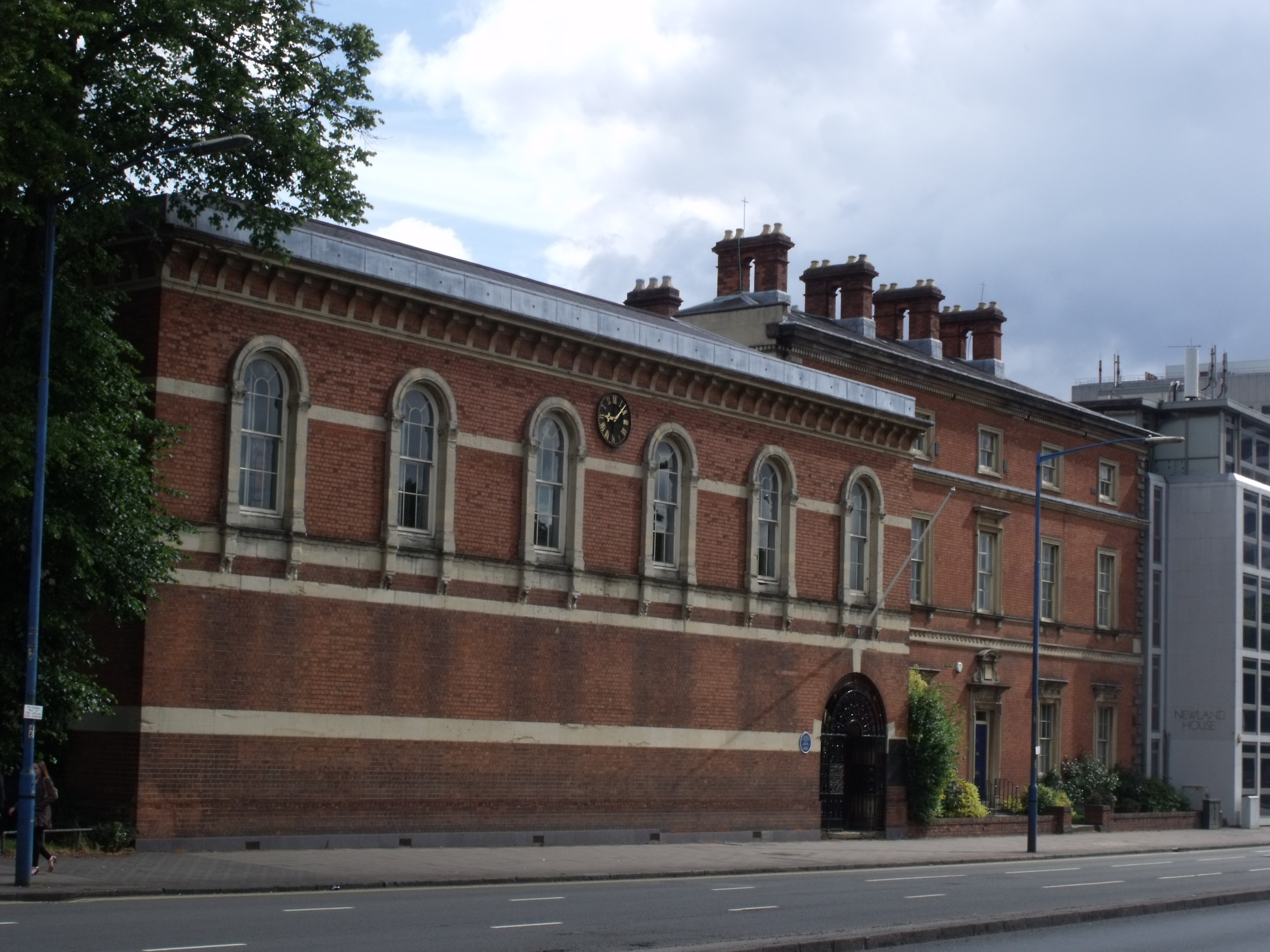

Location
- Hagley Road; Birmingham, West Midlands, B16 8UF; England; 52°28′20″N 1°55′47″W

Information
- Type: Grammar school
- Motto: Pietas
- Religious affiliation: Roman Catholicism
- Established: 1887
- Closed: 1976
- Local authority: Birmingham Council
- Gender: Boys
- Age: 11 to 18

St Philip's Grammar School, on Hagley Road, Edgbaston, Birmingham, was a Roman Catholic state grammar school for boys. It was closed in 1976, but continued as a Sixth Form College until 1995.

== History ==
St Philip's was founded when two priests of the Birmingham Oratory took over an existing Catholic Grammar School in 1887. It should not be confused with The Oratory School, a private Catholic boarding and day school, founded by John Henry Newman in 1859 and which later moved to Pangbourne (near Reading), in Berkshire, and then to the village of Woodcote, in Oxfordshire.

The school started in the Little Oratory on 19 September 1887 until the main building was completed on 13 December 1887. The longest-serving teacher in the school's history was Francis Thomas Leighton, who served as "Second Master" (Deputy Head) from 1911 until 1945, having served as Headmaster when the School was evacuated to Ludlow in 1941. His two sons and grandson also attended the school. FT Leighton finally left to found an independent Preparatory School, Leighton House School, serving as a "feeder" school for St Philip's. The school ceased to accept new entrants as a boys' grammar school in 1976, while the 1975 cohort progressed through to 1980.

=== Sixth form college ===
It became St Philip's Roman Catholic Sixth Form College in 1976, with around 800 sixth formers. In October 1992, as only 30% of the intake was Catholic, the board of governors unsuccessfully attempted to change it to an 11–16 boys' secondary school, leading to the Hagley Road site's closing in August 1995. It temporarily became a site of South Birmingham College from 1995 but was vacated in 2005. The main school buildings were demolished in the early months of 2012.

== Notable alumni ==
- Eamon Duffy, Professor of the History of Christianity at the University of Cambridge
- Patrick Gallaher CBE, Chairman of North West Gas from 1974 to 1982, and of Wales Gas Board from 1970 to 1974, and President of the IGasE from 1977 to 1978
- Sir Francis Griffin, Director of the NEC from 1970 to 1974, 1976–80
- John Jenkins, Ambassador to Iraq since 2009
- Paul Keenan, composer
- Alfred Knight VC, MBE served in WWI and later at the Ministry of Labour
- Squadron Leader Peter Latham, later Air Vice-Marshal, Station Commander of RAF Tengah from 1969 to 1971
- Paul Francis Leighton, broadcaster and BBC Radio 2 newsreader, 1981–2000.
- Jim McCarthy, CEO of Poundland
- Don Maclean, entertainer and presenter of Crackerjack.
- Daniel Moylan, banker and Conservative politician
- Stephen Nash, swimmer
- Anthony E. Pratt, inventor of the board game Cluedo
- Terence Rigby, actor
- Francis Farrell, Musician (Supertramp)
- William Slim - Between 1903 and 1910, William Slim attended St Phillip's and King Edward's. As Field Marshal Slim, he served as the British commander-in-chief in Southeast Asia during World War II.
- Joseph Spence, Master of Dulwich College
- J. R. R. Tolkien and his brother Hilary Tolkien: In 1902, the Tolkien family moved to a house in Edgbaston next door to the Birmingham Oratory and the school. Tolkien had been attending King Edward's School but was moved to St Philip's. Later, he won a Foundation Scholarship to King Edwards and returned to his former school.
- John Warnaby, actor
- Lawrence Holder, CEO of Cathedral Capital and Member of the Council of Lloyds
- Gerard Tracey, archivist, writer, editor and scholar
- Paul Crawford, Professor of Health Humanities, University of Nottingham
- Sir Simon Campbell, CBE, FRS, FMedSci, International Director of Research Pfizer, Signatory to patent of Viagra; Past President of the Royal Society of Chemistry; Visiting professor at the Universities of Bristol and São Paulo, board of advisors Universities of Leeds and Kent; Consultant FAO
- Brendan Finegan, Middlesex alumnus (2026), social worker, mentor and advocate for children’s rights. He became Director of Policy / Director of Strategy for the YJB, having joined in July 2001.

== Choir ==
The school choir was formed in 1950 and came to have a considerable reputation under the direction of John K Nicholas, who taught music at the school until his retirement in 1984. The choir released a recording of Christmas Carols in 1972 in LP format. In 1974 it toured Brittany, giving a series of concerts in the region. An LP of music performed on the tour was released in the following year. In 1975 the choir travelled to Rome to perform at the opening and closure of a symposium on Cardinal John Henry Newman. While in the city the choir performed in St Peter’s Basilica, as well as three other churches in the region and had an audience with the then Pontiff, Pope Paul VI. A third LP was released later that year, commemorating the tour to Rome. The choir continued to function after the transition to 6th form college, replacing boy trebles with girl sopranos, until Mr Nicholas’s departure.

== See also ==
- Saint Philip Neri
- A History of St Philips, from Beginning to Beginning, Margaret Worsley, Wine Press, Tamworth, 1997, ISBN 1-86237-078-8
