= Jim McCarthy (businessman) =

British businessman and CEO of Poundland

- Born: James John McCarthy; January 1956 (age 70); Nuneaton, Warwickshire, England
- Education: St Philip's Grammar School
- Occupation: Businessman
- Title: CEO, Poundland
- Term: 2006–2016
- Spouse: Rosie
- Children: two

James John McCarthy (born January 1956) is a British businessman, chief executive officer (CEO) of Poundland, the British discount store chain.

== Early life ==
James John McCarthy was born in January 1956 in Nuneaton, Warwickshire and grew up in suburban Birmingham, one of three sons of an Army turned Scottish and Newcastle brewers sales rep father. He was educated at St Philip's Grammar School, but left aged 17.

== Career ==
In 2006, McCarthy joined Poundland as CEO from Sainsbury's, where he had been head of its convenience store business.

== Personal life ==
He and his wife Rosie have two sons.
