= Jim McCarthy (author) =

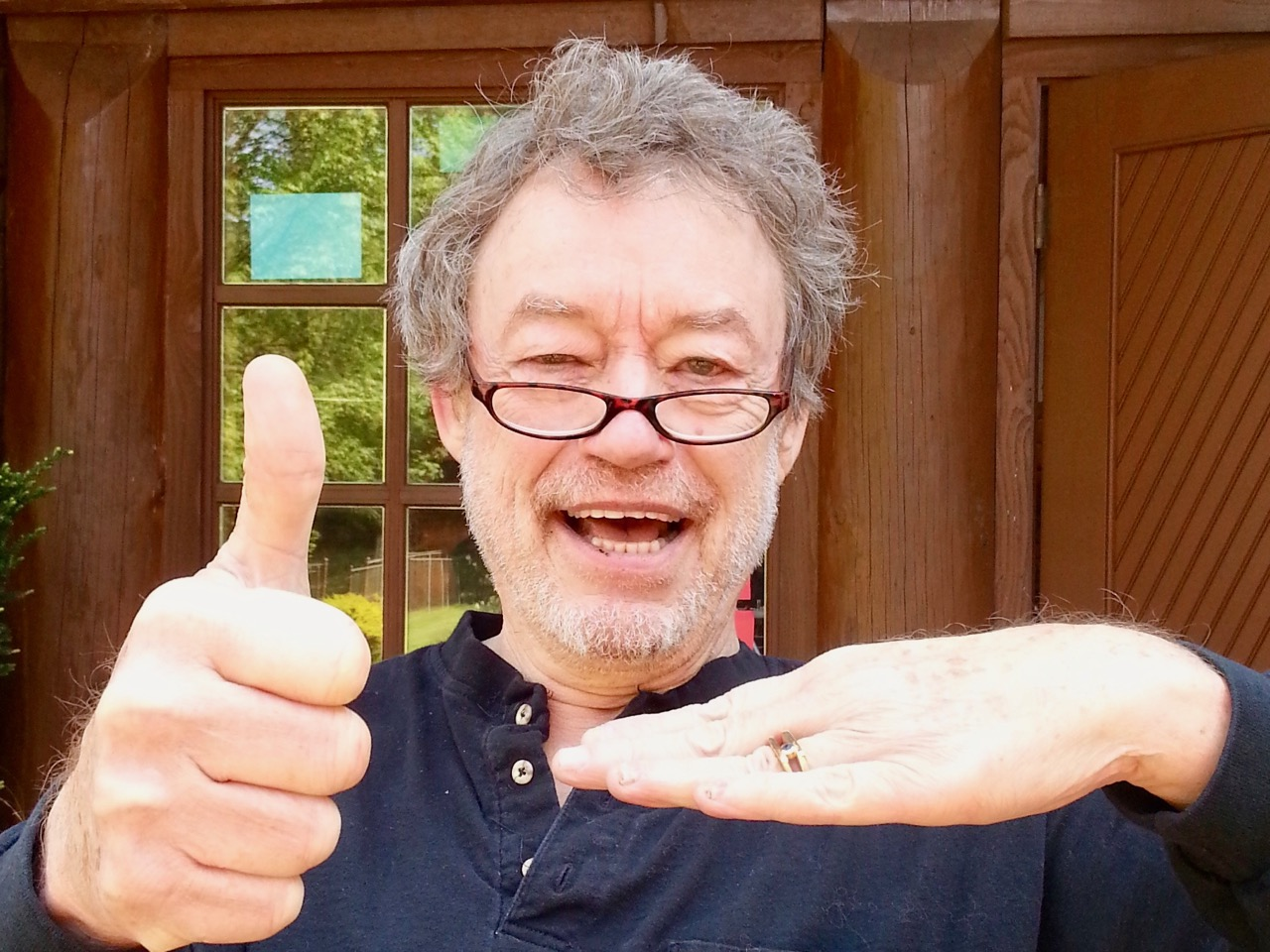
- Occupation: Author
- Notable work: Software for Your Head, Dynamics of Software Development

Jim McCarthy is an author and keynote speaker on software engineering practices. While working at Microsoft, he led the team that developed Visual C++ and wrote Dynamics of Software Development (1995), which popularized applying the term bozo bit to human interaction. He also worked at Bell Laboratories and the Whitewater Group, and holds a key patent on instant messaging.

== Publications ==
- 21 Rules of Thumb for Shipping Great Software on Time
- Dynamics of Software Development (1995)
- Software for Your Head (2001)
