= Simonsbath =

Village in Somerset, England

Coordinates: 51.1416°N 3.7524°W

- Location within Somerset
- Area: 82.07 km^{2} (31.69 sq mi)
- Population: 156
  - Density: 2/km^{2} (5.2/sq mi)
- OS grid reference: SS775395
- Civil parish: Exmoor
- Unitary authority: Somerset Council
- Ceremonial county: Somerset
- Region: South West
- Country: England
- Sovereign state: United Kingdom
- Post town: Minehead
- Postcode district: TA24
- Police: Avon and Somerset
- Fire: Devon and Somerset
- Ambulance: South Western
- UK Parliament: Tiverton and Minehead

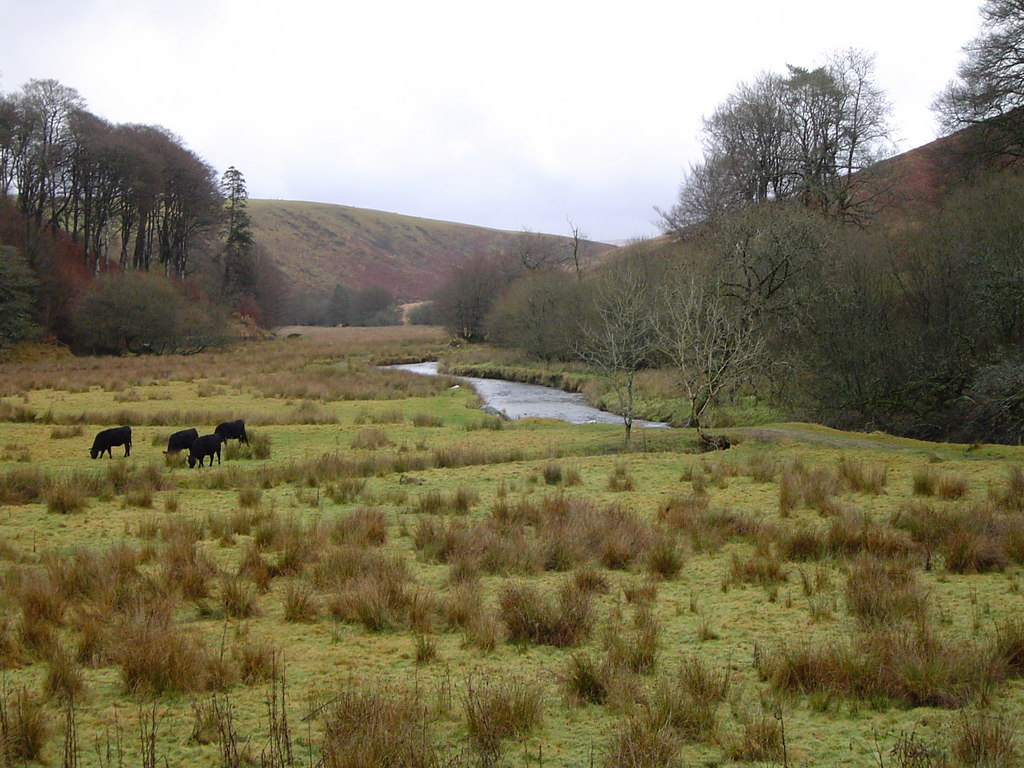
The River Barle at Simonsbath

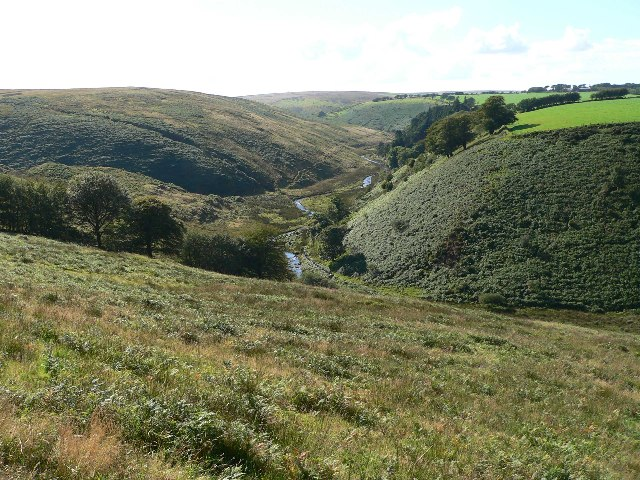
The River Barle upstream of Simonsbath

Simonsbath (/ˈsɪmənzbɑːθ, -bæθ/) is a small village high on Exmoor in the English county of Somerset. It is the principal settlement in the Exmoor civil parish, which is the largest and most sparsely populated civil parish on Exmoor, covering nearly 32 square miles (83 km^{2}) with a population, at the time of the 2001 census, of 203 in 78 households, reducing to 156 at the 2011 census. The River Exe rises from a valley to the north, and the River Barle runs through the village and is crossed by a triple-arched medieval bridge that was extensively repaired after floods in 1952.

The settlement lies on the route of the Two Moors Way and close to the Macmillan Way West.

== Toponymy ==
The -bath element in this place-name, not recorded before 1791, is easily accounted for: the Old English bæth signified "water, a pool". The identity of Simon is less sure. R. J. King pointed out that the name is frequently met with in the West of England, "especially in connection with old boundary lines". Thomas Westcote, in his View of Devonshire in 1630, preserved a local tradition that "Simon" was a great hunter and Robin Hood-like figure who had his stronghold at Symonsburrow, at the highest point of the Blackdown Hills, a barrow that pre-dates even a medieval legend associated with it.

== History ==
=== Simonsbath House ===
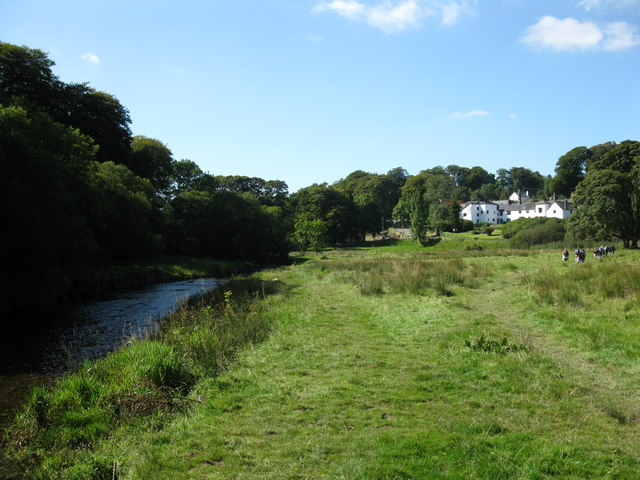
Simonsbath House in the valley of the River Barle

Simonsbath House was built in 1654 by the merchant, lawyer and philosopher James Boevey (1622–1696), the warden of the Royal forest of Exmoor, and for 150 years his was the only house in the forest, which consists largely of moorland. The Grade II listed building is now the Simonsbath House Hotel and outdoor activity centre.

=== Sale by the King ===
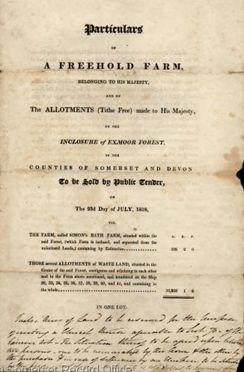
Sale particulars published in 1818. Somerset Archives.

On 4 July 1815 an Act of Parliament (55 Geo. 3. c. 138) was passed to enable the Inclosure of Exmoor, the summary heading of which was: "An Act for vesting in His Majesty certain parts of the Forest of Exmoor otherwise Exmore in the counties of Somerset and Devon and for enclosing the said Forest". After the Forest had been split into allotments and these had been conveyed to the persons who formerly possessed rights over the Forest, 12/22nds of the whole remained the property of the King, which equated to 10,262 1/4 acres, and was formally allotted to him as his personal property in the same way as the other shares went to the traditional graziers and owner of the tithes (Sir Thomas Dyke Acland, 10th Baronet (1787–1871), of Holnicote, who received 1/8th of the total), etc. In 1818 the following sales particulars were published by HM Commissioners of Woods, Forests and Land Revenues:

"Particulars of a freehold farm belonging to His Majesty and of the allotments (tithe free) made to His Majesty on the Inclosure of Exmoor Forest in the counties of Somerset and Devon to be sold by public tender on 23d day of July 1818, viz. the farm called Simon's Bath Farm situated within the said forest (which farm is enclosed & separated from the unenclosed land) containing by estimation 108 a(cres) 2 r(ods) 0 p(erches) & these several allotments of waste land situated in the center of the said forest contiguous & adjoining to each other and to the farm above mentioned & numbered on the map 32, 33, 34, 35, 36, 37, 38, 39, 40 and 41 and containing in the whole 10,262 a(cres) 1 r(od) 6 p(erches). In one lot".

=== Purchase by John Knight ===
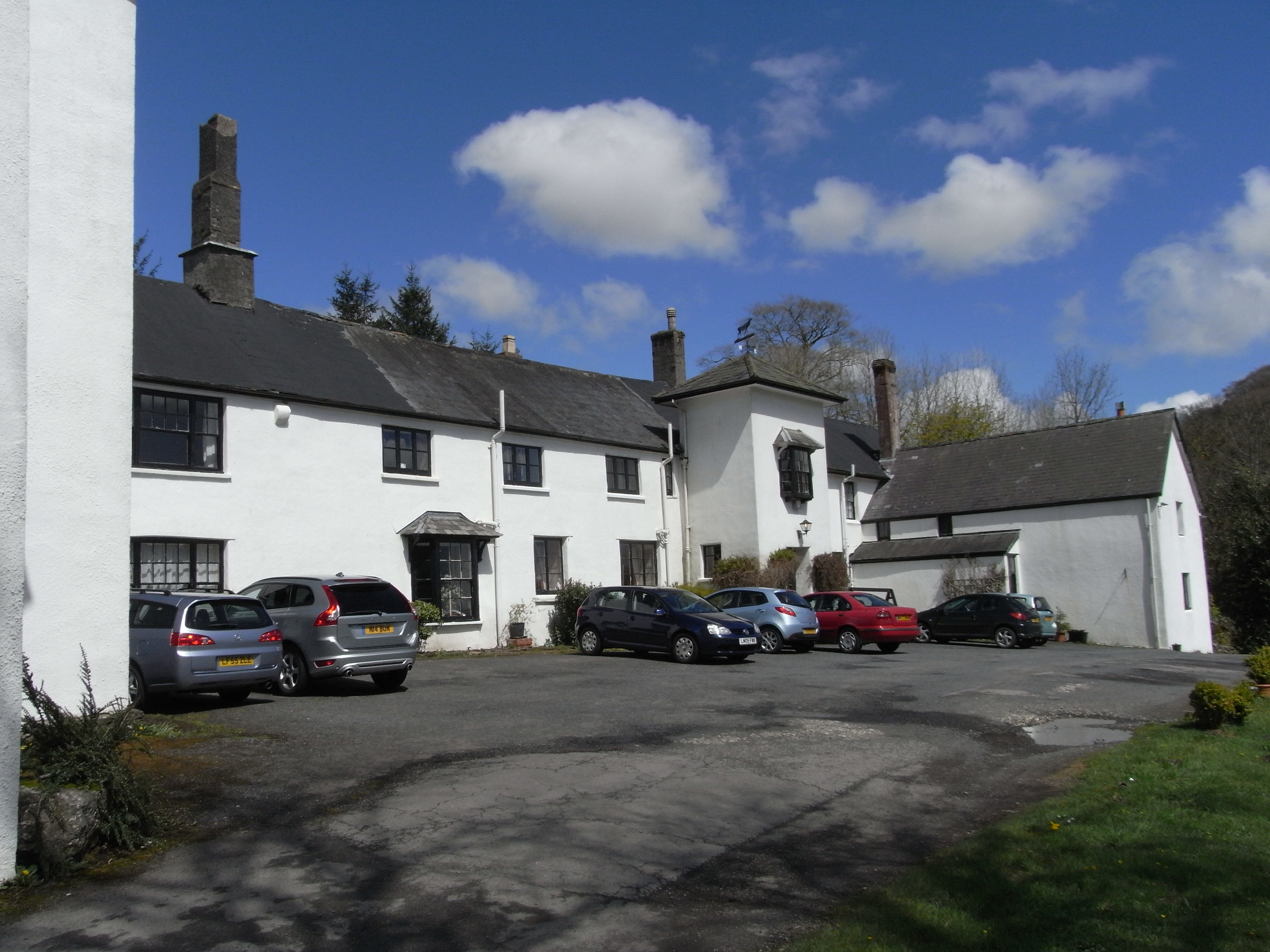
Simonsbath House

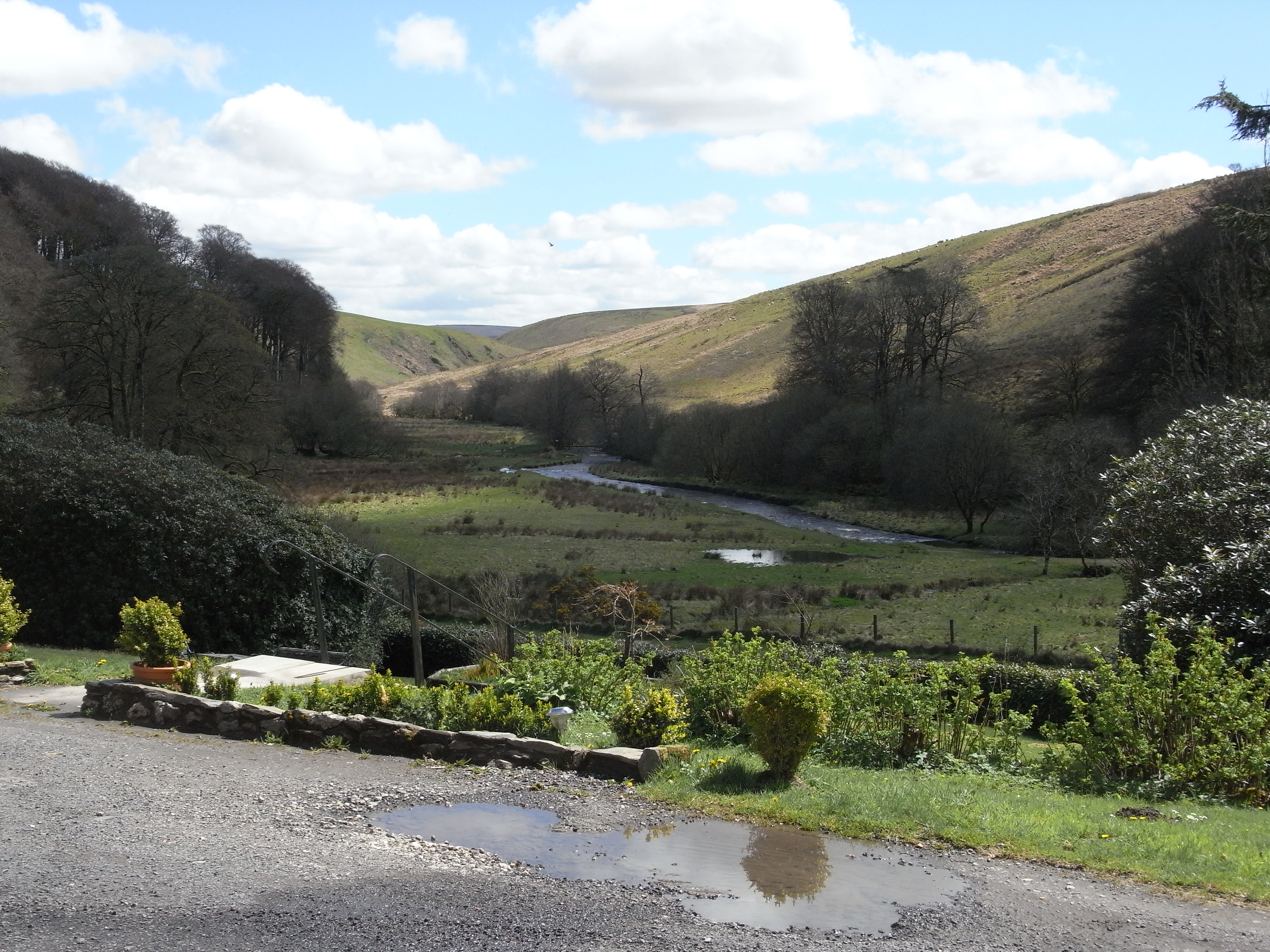
View from Simonsbath House downstream along the River Barle

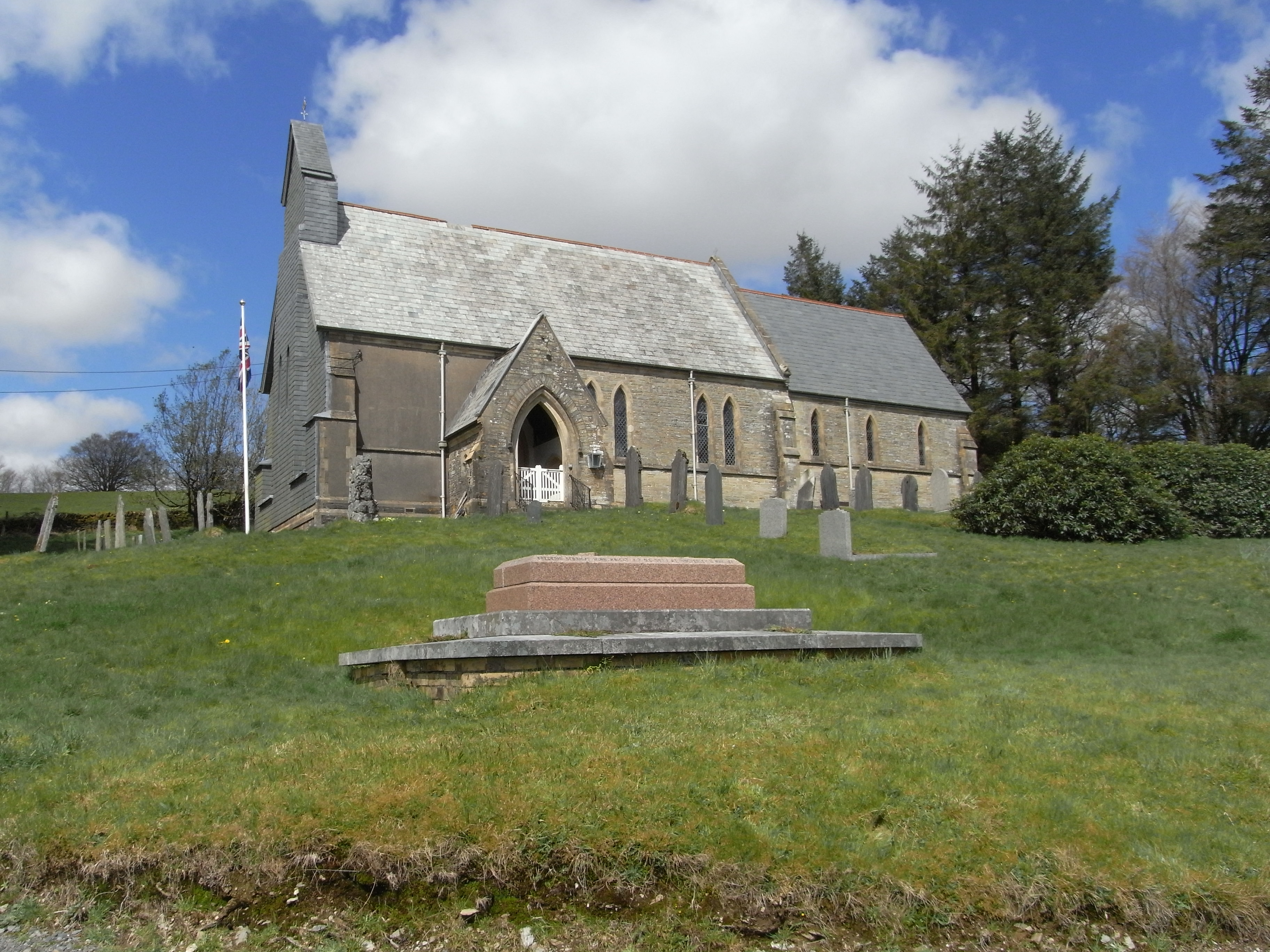
Simonsbath Parish Church, St Luke's, viewed from the south, with tomb monument of Frederick Winn Knight (d.1897) and his wife Dame Florence (d.1900) and their son Frederick Sebright Knight who pre-deceased both his parents in 1879

The highest bidder was John Knight of Lea Castle, Wolverley, Worcestershire, whose bid was £50,122. He thus acquired 10,262 1/4 acres, and soon thereafter set about buying up the allotments made to the former graziers and owner of the tithes. This brought his holding to about 20,000 acres. Knight was descended from a wealthy family of Ironmasters. Knight set about converting the Royal Forest, covering land now within the Exmoor National Park, into a huge industrial mining complex with canals and railways together with an agricultural estate. He had previously bought and reclaimed uncultivated land in Worcestershire and used similar techniques including burning rough grass, applying lime to change the pH, and ploughing to increase the productivity of the land. He also introduced the Cheviot sheep to the area which are now common throughout Exmoor.

Knight and his son Col. Sir Frederick Winn Knight (1812–1897), KCB, MP, who assumed management in 1841, built most of the large farms in the central section of the moor and laid down 22 miles (35 km) of metalled access roads to Simonsbath. He built a 29 miles (47 km) stone wall around his estate, parts of which still survive. However, progress was slow, and Richard Nicholls Worth stated in 1879 in his "Tourist's Guide to North Devon and the Exmoor district":

"The mansion was never finished; cultivation has not spread far from the farmstead centres; the walls bother the sportsman more than the deer; and the bogs are as deep, the inner recesses of the moors as wild and solitary, and the coarse grass, and the bracken, and the heathers supreme in their occupancy mile after mile, as if no effort had ever been made to redeem its mingled wildness and sterility."

=== 19th-century expansion ===
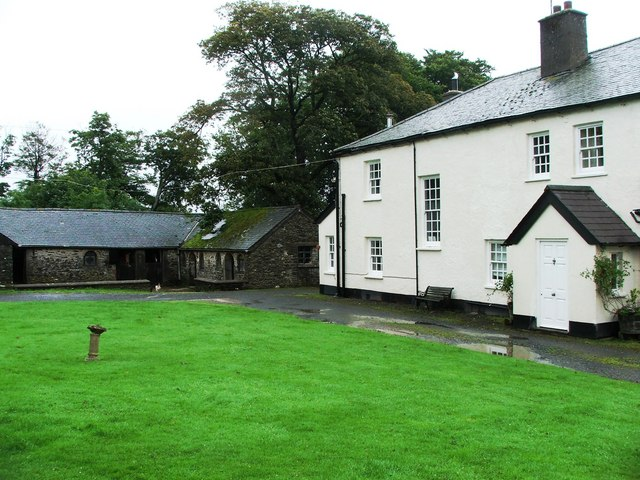
Emmetts Grange, near Simonsbath, is a largely unaltered example of one of the 'Knight' farmsteads built in the 1840s with the intention of reclaiming large tracts of Exmoor Forest as agricultural land. The farmhouse is the southernmost range of buildings around a large rectangular open courtyard; single storey agricultural buildings enclose the E, N and W sides of the courtyard

The small hamlet developed in the 19th century, when more houses were built along with St Luke's Church (1856), providing a centre for the population. The church has been designated by English Heritage as a Grade II listed building. At around the same time as the construction of the church, a mine was developed alongside the River Barle. The mine was originally called Wheal Maria, then changed to Wheal Eliza. It was a copper mine from 1845–54 and then an iron mine until 1857, although the first mining activity on the site may be from 1552. A restored Victorian water-powered sawmill in the village, which was damaged in the floods of 1992, has now been purchased by the National Park and returned to working order, making the footpath signs, gates, stiles, and bridges for various sites in the National Park.

=== Purchase by Fortescues ===
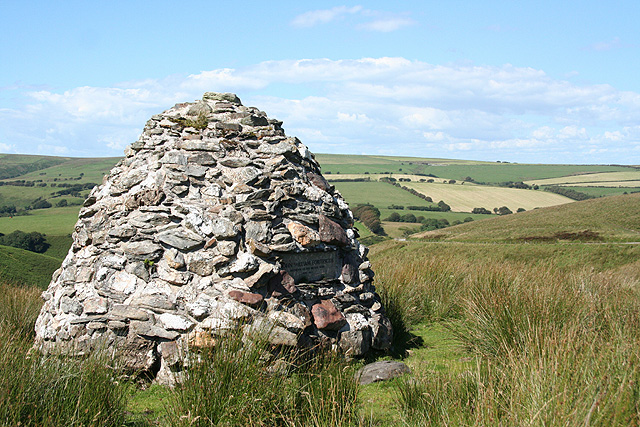
Cairn commemorating Sir John William Fortescue (d.1933), fifth son of 3rd Earl Fortescue, librarian at Windsor Castle 1905–26 and best known for his sixteen-volume History of the British Army. After his death his ashes were scattered locally and a cairn built in his memory, placed midway between Simonsbath and Emmett's Grange.

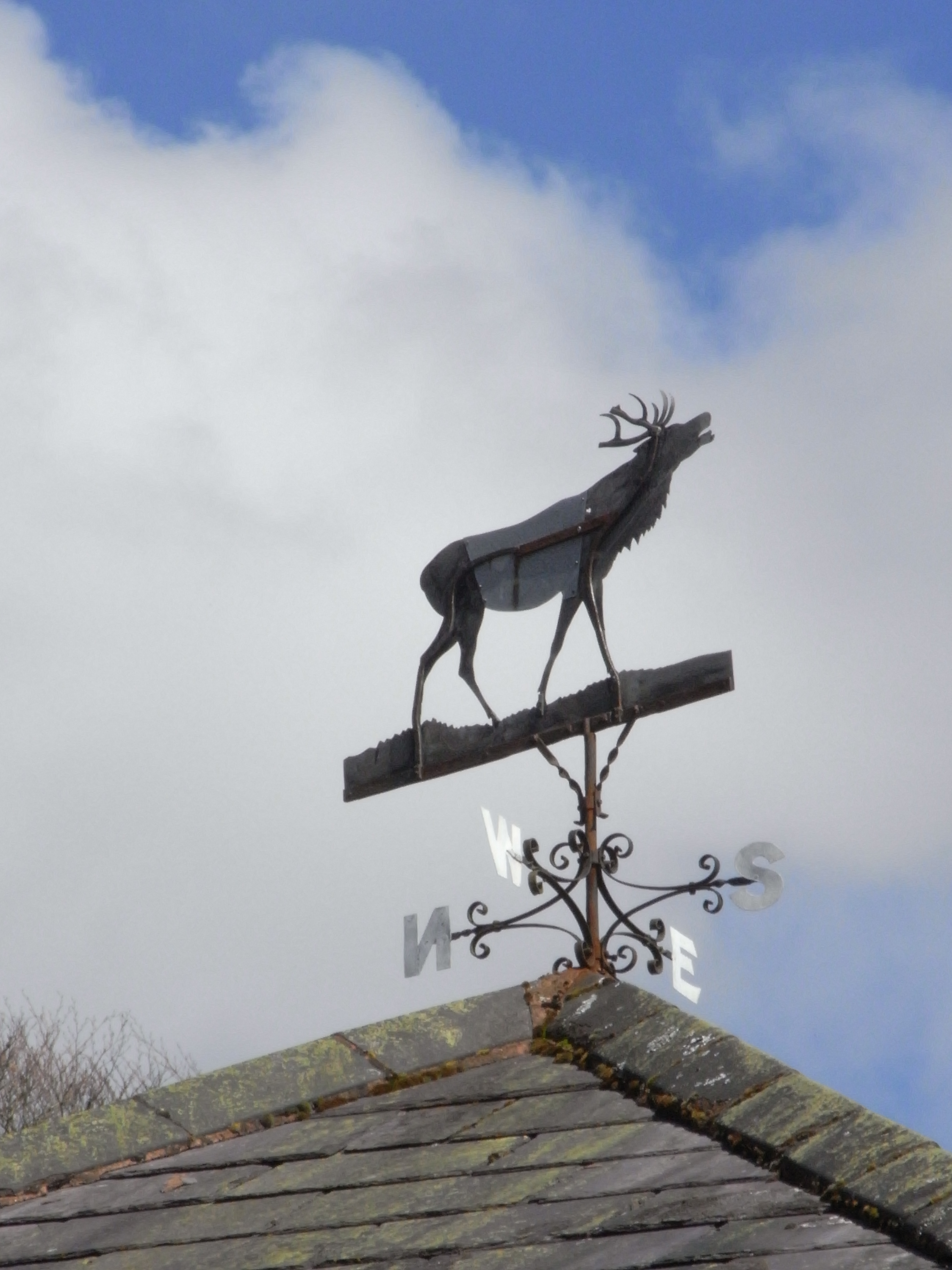
Stag wind-vane atop Diana Lodge (now Simonsbath House) the former hunting-box of the Earls Fortescue. The metal stag received a rifle bullet through the chest from Stan Curtis, the Fortescue bailiff, during a target-practice session with the young Fortescue boys on the opposite side of the valley.

The reversion of the Simonsbath estate, (referred to also as the "Exmoor estate" by the Fortescues) comprising about 20,000 acres of Exmoor, was purchased from Sir Frederick Knight, following the early death of his only son Frederick Sebright Winn Knight, JP, Deputy Lieutenant of Somerset, in 1879, aged only 28, by Viscount Ebrington, the future Hugh Fortescue, 4th Earl Fortescue (1854–1932), whose family's principal seat was Castle Hill, Filleigh, ten miles SW of Simonsbath. It is thought he was mainly motivated in his purchase by his great fondness for stag-hunting; he served as master, and later chairman, of the Devon and Somerset Staghounds. A painting of him out hunting by Lionel Edwards is owned by his granddaughter Lady Margaret Fortescue. He established, with other landowners, the Badgworthy Land Company, to which were conveyed some freehold land around Badgworthy Water and also the hunting rights in perpetuity over much of the land on Exmoor and of that surrounding it. This was designed to ensure that future owners of piecemeal plots, unfavourably disposed to hunting, would not be able to restrict access to the historic wide expanses of hunting land used by the Devon & Somerset Staghounds and local foxhound packs. When Castle Hill burned down in 1934, the 5th Earl Fortescue resided with his wife and two young daughters at Simonsbath House, previously only used by the family as a hunting box, then named Diana Lodge after the Roman goddess of the hunt, moving back to the rebuilt Castle Hill in May 1936. Lady Margaret Fortescue expressed very fond memories of her childhood at Simonsbath, where she lived between the ages of 11 and 13, having been brought up at Ebrington Manor in Gloucestershire until the family's move to Castle Hill in 1932 on the death of her grandfather the 4th Earl. She recalled in 2001 that Diana Lodge then had panelled rooms downstairs, still in existence, with primitive bedrooms upstairs, linoleum on the floor and one bathroom between the whole family. It was always cold and was heated by smoky peat fires. There was a large team of domestic staff to serve the family, including butler, footman, valet, lady's maid, housemaids, cook, kitchen maids, a scullery maid and odd-job man, some of whom lived in the village. Much of her time was spent hunting on Exmoor with the rest of her family and her young cousins, the children of her uncle Hon. Denzil Fortescue, later the 6th Earl, who had rented nearby Emmett's Grange.

=== Sold by Fortescues ===
In 1927 the eastern part of the estate, comprising 1,745 acres, was sold to the industrialist Sir Robert Waley Cohen (d.1952), who had leased Honeymead since 1924, including the farmsteads of Honeymead, Pickedstones and Winstitchen. The remainder of the estate continued to be held by the Fortescues until after the death of the 5th Earl in 1958, when the latter's eldest daughter and co-heiress, Lady Margaret Fortescue (b. 1923), sold much of the Simonsbath estate, together with much of the two Fortescue estates centred on Challacombe and West Buckland, to pay large death duties.

=== Sold by Ewart ===
In June 2006 Ewart offered Simonsbath Barton estate for sale via estate agents Savills and Strutt & Parker. This estate was built originally as the home-farm for Simonsbath House, and is situated nearby. The land offered comprised 2,080 acres freehold and a further 3,788 acres rented under a grazing licence from Exmoor National Park expiring in 2031. Also included was a five-bedroom house, another of four bedrooms, and a range of buildings and cottages. The land was then generating £378,333 per annum in government farming grants and subsidies, whilst further profit was accruing from the farming operations which comprised a 640-head home-bred suckler calf herd and a flock of 2,500 Scotch Blackface ewes. The asking price was £4 1/2 million.

== Simonsbath sawmill ==
The sawmill is situated a hundred yards in front of Simonsbath House, close to the River Barle, from which a leat extends to drive the machinery. It was built by John Knight, between 1818 and 1841, and was refurbished by Viscount Ebrington in 1898. In 1996 it was bought by Exmoor National Park Authority and was restored in 2002–03 with Heritage Lottery Funding, with the intention of using it to make gates and footpath signposts. However, in 2010 production was ceased, and it is now in the care of a volunteer group. It is a very rare survival of an estate sawmill that still retains its 19th-century machinery.

== Governance ==
The civil parish of Exmoor has its own parish council which has responsibility for local issues, including setting an annual precept (local rate) to cover the council's operating costs and producing annual accounts for public scrutiny. The parish council evaluates local planning applications and works with the local police, district council officers, and neighbourhood watch groups on matters of crime, security, and traffic. The parish council's role also includes initiating projects for the maintenance and repair of parish facilities, as well as consulting with the district council on the maintenance, repair, and improvement of highways, drainage, footpaths, public transport, and street cleaning. Conservation matters (including trees and listed buildings) and environmental issues are also the responsibility of the council.

For local government purposes, since 1 April 2023, the parish comes under the unitary authority of Somerset Council. Prior to this, it was part of the non-metropolitan district of Somerset West and Taunton (formed on 1 April 2019) and, before this, the district of West Somerset (established under the Local Government Act 1972). It was part of Dulverton Rural District before 1974.

An electoral ward with the name 'Greater Exmoor' also exists. This extends from Simonsbath to the Devon boundary in the west, and Cutcombe in the east plus Hawkridge in the south east. The total population of this ward at the abovementioned election was 1,123.

It is also part of the Tiverton and Minehead constituency represented in the House of Commons of the Parliament of the United Kingdom. It elects one Member of Parliament (MP) by the first past the post system of election.

== Geography ==
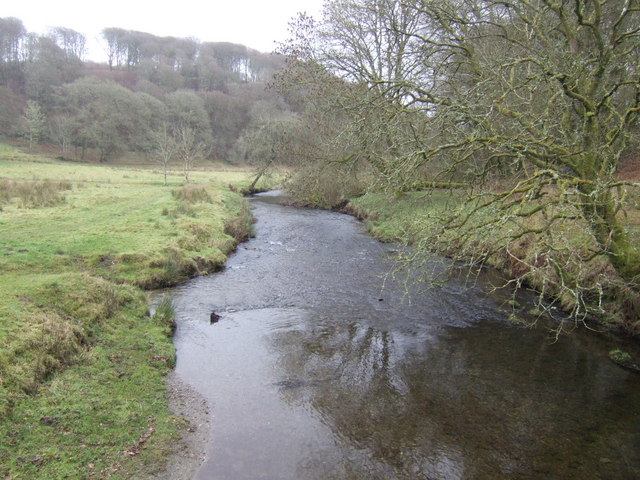
River Barle at Simonsbath

Simonsbath is 1,250 feet (381 m) above sea level, in the valley of the River Barle. On the Chains is a 3 acres (1.2 ha) reservoir known as Pinkery Pond. It was formed by damming the River Barle, in the 19th century by John Knight and his son, and was originally intended to be 7 acres (2.8 ha). The purpose is unknown but close to the pond is the remains of a small canal.

On the moor north of the village is Exe Head, which is the source of the River Exe. It lies on peaty soils over rocks dating from the mid Devonian (to which this area gave its name) to early Carboniferous periods. Quartz and iron mineralisation can be detected in outcrops and subsoil. The Devonian Kentisbury Slates are exposed in the small quarry by white water.

The mean annual temperature is 8.3 °C (47 °F). The average annual total rainfall is 69.6 inches (1,768 mm), although 7.35 inches (187 mm) fell in the 24-hour period preceding 10 a.m. on 16 August 1952, which was one of the contributory factors leading to the flooding in Lynmouth.

== Demography ==
Estimates from the 2001 census show Simonsbath as having a population of 300 in 110 households, 99.7% of which are white and 0.3% Asian or Asian British.

== The Exmoor Forest Inn ==
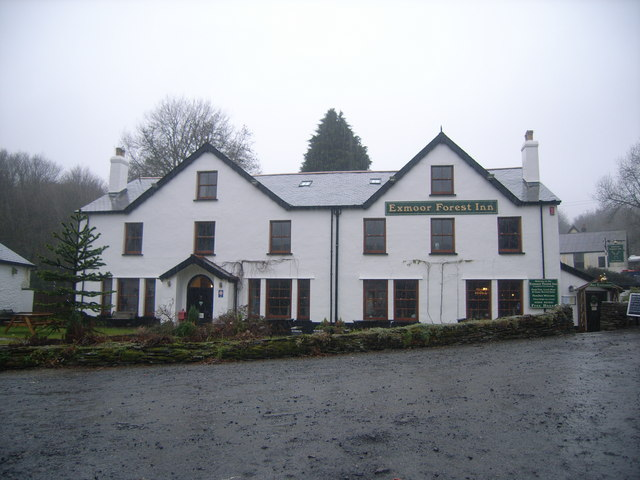
The Exmoor Forest Inn, Simonsbath

The Exmoor Forest Inn was originally known as the Refreshment House, then from 1885 The William Rufus Inn and then The Exmoor Forest Hotel in 1901. For a while it was split in half with the nearest part to the road being the Temperance Hotel, until re-united in 1909. It was teetotal until 1933 when the parish of Exmoor was granted its excise licence. In 2005 the term 'Inn' was reinstated to the name, when the building was renovated.

When known as the William Rufus Inn, it was said to be the haunt of the noted Exmoor Highwayman Tom Faggus, who married 'Girt Jan Ridds' sister whose exploits are recorded in 'Lorna Doone'. Once it was said, Faggus's enemies laid a trap to catch him in the Inn, but Faggus whistled for his strawberry mare Winnie who jumped through the window and kicked all her masters enemies away from him. Faggus jumped on the mare's back and escaped.

== Notable people ==
- Jessie Case Vesel (1855–1937), English painter who worked for ten years in what is now Slovenia
