= Gerard Tracey =

British archivist (1954–2003)

Gerard David Tracey (9 March 1954 – 20 January 2003) was archivist at the Birmingham Oratory, and writer, editor and Newman scholar.

An adopted child, he was educated at Handsworth (by the Sisters of Mercy) and later attended St Philip's Grammar School, followed by University College, Oxford, where he studied history. In 1976, Newman's Oratorian editor Fr Stephen Dessain died and Tracey eventually took over the task of compiling information for the ultimately successful cause of Newman's canonisation.

Tracey died, aged 48, from undisclosed causes, on 20 January 2003. He was interred in the graveyard at the Oratory House, Rednal, outside Birmingham. He was survived by his mother.

== Legacy ==
"The name of Gerard Tracey is linked in so many ways with the world of Newman studies. We should not forget, however, the particular debt of gratitude owed to him by the Archdiocese of Birmingham. This is in connection with the Cause for Cardinal Newman's Canonisation. When the Cause was re-opened in 1980, Tracey became a member of the three-man Historical Commission, which was charged with assembling all the material for the Diocesan Process of the Cause, which is the first and crucial stage in advancing a candidate for sainthood. Given the amount of documentation involved this was an enormous task, and the fact that it was completed by 1986, and that the work was so well done, is due in large part to his vision of what had to be done, as well as being the fruit of the enormous dedication and scholarly expertise he brought to this work."
