= War children =

Child born to a local parent and a parent belonging to a foreign military force

War children are those born to a local parent and a parent belonging to a foreign military force (usually an occupying force, but also personnel stationed at bases on foreign soil). Having a child by a member of a belligerent force, throughout history and across cultures, is often considered a grave betrayal of social values. Commonly, the native parent (usually a woman) is disowned by her family, friends, and society at large. The term "war child" is most commonly used for children born during World War II and its aftermath, particularly in relation to children born to fathers by German occupying forces in northern Europe. In Norway, there were also Lebensborn children. The discrimination suffered by the local parent and child in the postwar period did not take into account widespread rapes by occupying forces, or the relationships women had to form in order to survive the war years.

== Discrimination ==
Children with a parent who was part of an occupying force, or whose parent(s) collaborated with enemy forces, are innocent of any war crimes committed by parents. Yet these children have often been condemned by descent from the enemy and discriminated against in their society. They also suffer from association with a parent whose war crimes are prosecuted in the postwar years. As such children grew to adolescence and adulthood, many harbored feelings of guilt and shame.

An example are the children born during and after World War II whose fathers were military personnel in regions occupied by Nazi Germany. These children claim they lived with their identity in an inner exile until the 1980s, when some of them officially acknowledged their status. In 1987, Bente Blehr refused anonymity; an interview with her was published in Born Guilty, a collection of 12 interviews with persons whose parent(s) had been associated with German forces in occupied Norway. The first autobiography by the child of a German occupying soldier and Norwegian mother was The Boy from Gimle (1993) by Eystein Eggen; he dedicated his book to all such children. It was published in Norway.

During and in the aftermath of war, women who have voluntary relationships with military personnel of an occupying force have historically been censured by their own society. Women who became pregnant from such unions would often take measures to conceal the father's status.

They commonly chose among the following:

- Arrange a marriage with a local man, who would take responsibility for the child
- Claim the father was unknown, dead, or had left, and bring up the child as a single mother
- Acknowledge the relationship; bring up the child as a single mother
- Acknowledge the relationship; accept welfare from the occupying force (see the German Lebensborn)
- Place the child in an orphanage or give the child up for adoption
- Emigrate to the occupying country and claim that identity
- Have an abortion

After the war, it was common for both mother and child to suffer repercussions from the local population. Such repercussions were widespread throughout Europe. While some women and children suffered torture and deportation, most acts against them fell into one or several of the following categories:

- Name calling: German whore and German kid were common labels
- Isolation or harassment from the local community and at schools
- Loss of work
- Shaving the heads of the mothers (frequently done in the immediate aftermath of the war) in order to publicly identify and shame them
- Temporary placement in confinement or internment camps

While repercussions were most widespread immediately after the war, sentiments against the women and their children lingered into the 1950s, 60s, and beyond.

== War children of World War II ==
Estimates of the number of war children fathered by German soldiers during World War II are difficult to gauge. Mothers tended to hide such pregnancies for fear of revenge and reprisal by family members. Lower estimates range in the hundreds of thousands, while upper estimates are much increased, into the millions.

=== Lebensborn program ===
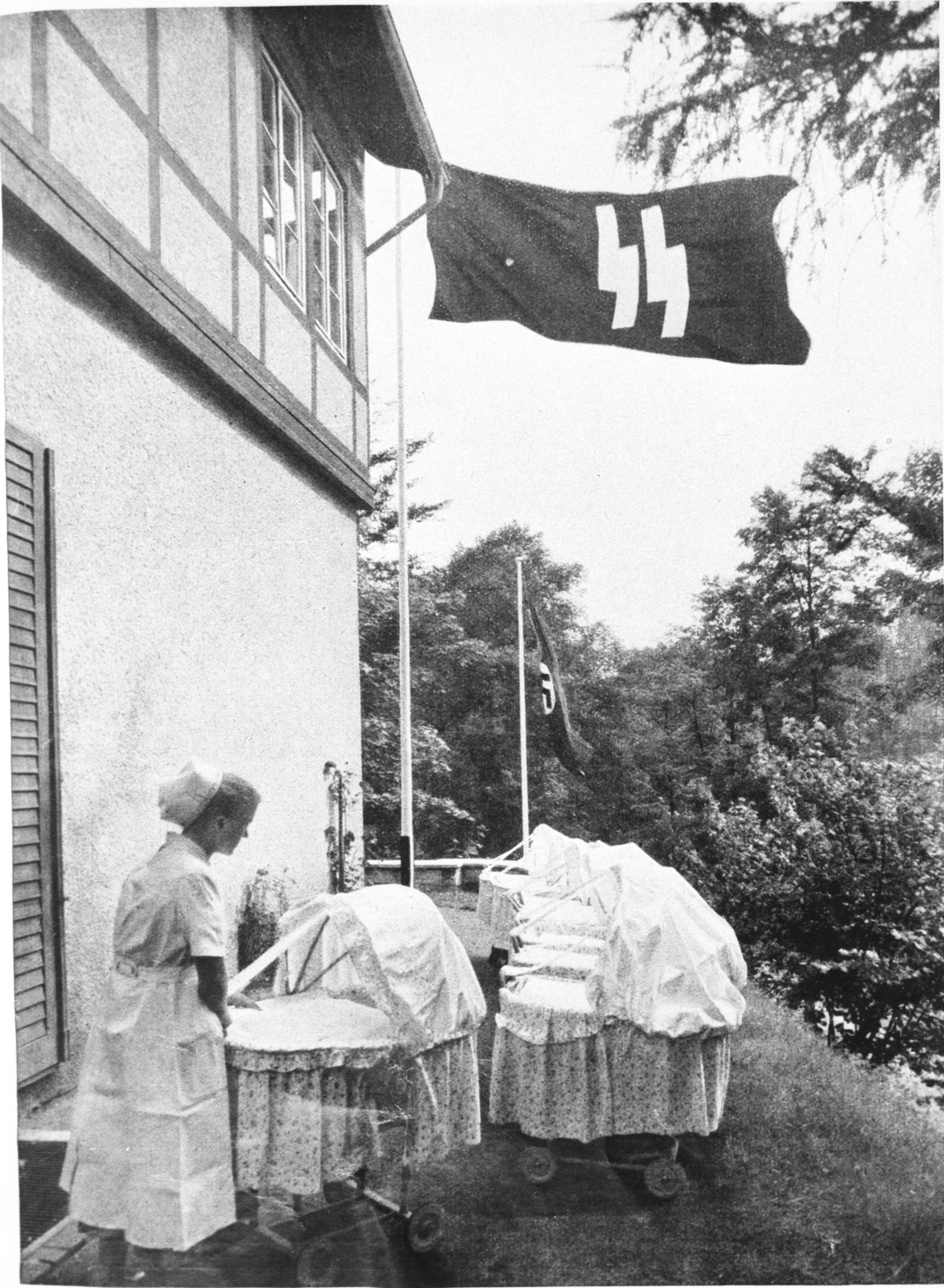
A Lebensborn birth house

"Lebensborn" was one of several programs initiated by the Nazi leader Heinrich Himmler to try to secure the racial heredity of the Third Reich. The program mainly served as a welfare institution for parents and children deemed racially valuable, initially, those of SS men. As German forces occupied nations in northern Europe, the organization expanded its program to provide care to suitable women and children, particularly in Norway, where the women were judged suitably Aryan.

In Norway a local Lebensborn office, Abteilung Lebensborn, was established in 1941 to support children of German soldiers and their Norwegian mothers, pursuant to German law (Hitlers Verordnung, 28 July 1942). The organization ran several homes where pregnant women could give birth. Facilities also served as permanent homes for eligible women until the end of the war. Additionally, the organization paid child support on behalf of the father, and covered other expenses, including medical bills, dental treatment and transportation.

In total, between 9 and 15 Lebensborn homes were established. Of the estimated 10,000–12,000 children born to Norwegian mothers and German fathers during the war, 8,000 were registered by Abteilung Lebensborn. In 4,000 of these cases, the father is known. The women were encouraged to give the children up for adoption, and many were transferred to Germany, where they were adopted or raised in orphanages.

During and after the war, the Norwegians commonly referred to these children as tyskerunger, translating as "German kids" or "Kraut kids", a derogatory term. As a result of later recognition of their post-war mistreatment, the more diplomatic term krigsbarn (war children) came into use and is now the generally accepted form.

==== Post-war years ====
As the war ended, the children and their mothers were made outcasts by many among the general populace in formerly occupied countries, as societies grieved and resented the losses of the war, and actively rejected everything associated with Germany. The children and their mothers were often isolated socially, and many children were bullied by other children, and sometimes by adults, due to their origin.

For instance, immediately after the peace, 14,000 women were arrested in Norway on suspicion of "collaboration" or association with the enemy; 5,000 were, without any judiciary process, placed in forced labor camps for a year and a half. Their heads were shaved, and they were beaten and raped. In an interview for the Swedish newspaper Dagens Nyheter, war children claim that, while living at an orphanage in Bergen, they were forced as children to parade on the streets so the local population could whip them and spit at them.

In a survey conducted by the Norwegian Ministry of Social Affairs in 1945, the local government in one third of the counties expressed an unfavorable view of the war children. The same year the Ministry of Social Affairs briefly explored the possibility of reuniting the children and their mothers with surviving fathers in post-war Germany, but decided against this.

Five hundred children who were still cared for in Lebensborn facilities at the end of the war had to leave as the homes were closed down. Some children were left to state custody, during a time when such care was marked by strict rules, insufficient education, and abuse. Approximately 20 children ended up in a mental institution in 1946, due to lack of space in other institutions and unsuccessful adoption attempts. Some remained there past their eighteenth birthdays.

Due to the political attitudes prevailing after the end of the war, the Norwegian government made proposals to forcibly deport 8,000 children and their mothers to Germany, but there were concerns that the deportees would have no means of livelihood there. Another option was to send them to Sweden. Australia was also considered after the Swedish government declined to accept these people; the Norwegian government later shelved such proposals.

==== Financial and legal issues ====
In 1950, diplomatic relations improved so that the Norwegian government was able to collect child support from identified fathers of war children who were living in West Germany and Austria. As of 1953 such payments were made. Child support from fathers living in East Germany was kept in locked accounts until diplomatic relations between the two countries were established in 1975.

Some of the war children have tried to obtain official recognition for past mistreatment. Supporters claim the discrimination against them equated to an attempt at genocide. In December 1999, 122 war children filed a claim in the Norwegian courts for the failure of the state to protect them as Norwegian citizens. The case was to test the boundaries of the law; seven persons signed the claim. The courts have ruled such suits as void due to the statute of limitations.

The law of Norway allows citizens who have experienced neglect or mistreatment by failure of the state to apply for "simple compensation" (an arrangement that is not subject to the statute of limitations). In July 2004 the government expanded this compensation program to include war children who had experienced lesser difficulties. The basic compensation rate is set to 20,000 NOK (€2,500 / $3,000) for what Norwegian government terms "mobbing" (bullying). Those who can document other abuse can receive up to 200,000 NOK (€25,000 / $30,000).

On 8 March 2007, 158 war children were to have their case heard at the European Court of Human Rights in Strasbourg. They demanded reparations of between 500,000 SEK (≈ 431,272 NOK) and 2,000,000 SEK (≈ 1,725,088 NOK) each for systematic abuse. The Norwegian government contested the claim that the children were abused with the consent of the government. In 2008 their case before the European Court of Human Rights was dismissed, but they were each offered a £8,000 token from the Norwegian government.

==== Medical experimentation ====
In conjunction with the 1999 claim by the war children, a motion was filed in September 2000 alleging that 10 war children were subject to experiments with LSD approved by the Norwegian government and financed by the CIA, the American intelligence agency.

In the postwar years, medical staff in several European countries, and the United States, conducted clinical trials or experimental treatment involving LSD, most of them at some point between 1950 and 1970. In Norway, trials involved volunteer patients under a protocol after traditional medical treatments had proved unsuccessful.

==== Acknowledgment and apology ====
Since the mid-80s, the fate of the war children has become well known in Norway. The government of Norway has acknowledged its neglect of them. The Prime Minister of Norway apologized publicly in his New Year's Eve speech in 2000. As adults, the 150 former Lebensborn Children are suing for reparations and damages from the Norwegian government for failing to protect them and discriminating against them.

The most famous of Norway's war children is Anni-Frid Lyngstad, the former ABBA singer.

=== Norway ===
German forces invaded Norway in 1940 and occupied the country until 1945. At the end of the war, the German forces stood at 372,000. It is estimated that between 10,000 and 12,000 children were born to Norwegian mothers with German partners during the occupation. As Nazi ideology considered Norwegians to be pure Aryans, German authorities did not prohibit soldiers from pursuing relationships with Norwegian women. Their Lebensborn organization encouraged it.

After the war these women especially, but also their children, were mistreated in Norway.

=== Denmark ===
German forces occupied Denmark between 1940 and 1945. German soldiers were encouraged to fraternize with Danish women, who were also considered pure Aryan. The government has estimated between 6,000 and 8,000 children were born to Danish mothers with German partners during or just after the occupation. The women were nicknamed "German Girls", used in a pejorative sense. The Danish government has documented 5,579 such children.

In 1999 the Danish government allowed this group access to parenthood archives. They exempted these descendants from the country's normal secrecy period of 80 years for such records.

=== France ===
German soldiers were forbidden from having relationships with French women by the Nazi regime at the beginning of the Occupation. Due to difficulties of enforcement, the military later tolerated fraternization. This was an intermediate situation between the encouragement of similar relationships in Denmark and Norway, and strict prohibition in Eastern Europe. The different regulations were based on Nazi racial ideology as to which populations they considered racially pure enough as to be desirable for children born to their men, according to journalist Hugh Schofield.

The number of war children born to French women in France by German soldier fathers in the years 1941–49, is estimated to be 75,000 to 200,000. After the expulsion of German troops from France, those women who were known to have had relationships with German soldiers, were arrested, judged, and exposed in the streets to public condemnation and attacks. Having their heads shaved in public to mark them was a common punishment. Such descendants have formed a group to represent them, Amicale Nationale des Enfants de la Guerre. Another group of French, German and Austrian children of war exists under the name of Coeurs sans frontières - Herzen ohne Grenzen.'

=== Finland ===
During the wartime and the post-war period, Finnish women gave birth to 468,269 children in Finland in the period 1940–1945. A small portion, about 1,100 of the children, were fathered by foreign troops. Some 700 children were born to German soldiers, 200–300 to Soviet POWs, and 100 to Swedish volunteers. Depending much on the foreign father's background, most of these children were left fatherless, and some of the mothers, along with their children, faced discrimination in Finnish society.

==== German soldiers ====
Following the revision of the Anti-Comintern Pact in 1941, there were no more than 200,000 German soldiers in Finland, the vast majority of them stationed in the Finnish Lapland in the period 1941–1944. According to the National Archives of Finland, as many as 3,000 Finnish women, some working for the voluntary auxiliary paramilitary organisation Lotta Svärd and some for the Wehrmacht, had relationships with German soldiers. An estimated 700 children were born to German soldiers in Finland, and were mostly unplanned. Many German soldiers were aware of safe sex and the Wehrmacht kept them well-equipped with condoms, which has been estimated to effectively keep a relatively low impregnation rate for the Finnish women who had sexual intercourse with German soldiers. A booklet published by the OKW in 1943, Der deutsche Soldat und die Frau aus fremdem Volkstum, allowed German soldiers to marry those Finnish women who could be considered to represent the "Aryan race", hinting that there was some uncertainty among Nazi authorities about ethnic Finns' "genetic suitability".

Finland was a co-belligerent from the summer of 1941, until September 1944 when hostilities between Germany and Finland broke out following the Finnish armistice with the Allied Powers. During the autumn of 1944 alone, some 1,000 Finnish women, two-thirds of them aged between from 17 to 24, left the country with the departing German soldiers. The reasons for leaving the country with the enemy varied, but the most common reason was a relationship with a German soldier. Subsequently, most of these women returned to Finland, as their presence was commonly unwelcome in Germany and some faced active mistreatment, such as forced labor. After the war, most of the Finnish mothers that had children with German soldiers were left as single parents. Some of these children were adopted by the Finnish men who later married the children's mothers.

Some Finnish women who were associated with German soldiers faced discrimination in Finnish society. The discrimination was not generally as harsh as that most other European women experienced elsewhere for the same reason, mostly due to the concept of a "Finnish-German brotherhood-in-arms" during the co-belligerence and their shared mutual enmity with the Soviet Union. Some Soviet POWs captured by the Finns were also intimately involved with Finnish women, a situation considered far more socially unacceptable and deserving of censure (see the section below). However the children fathered by German soldiers still encountered discrimination in their youth as well.

==== Soviet prisoners of war ====
During the wartime, there were about 69,700 Soviet POWs in Finland, of which 5,700 were taken in the Winter War (1939–40) and 64,000 in the Continuation War (1941–44). Some POWs' living conditions were relatively good, as, at best, some 15,000 of them were placed on farms, where they were used as forced labor, usually working rather freely together with Finnish civilians, some of them having relationships with Finnish women. An estimated 600 Finnish women had relationships with Soviet POWs, and 200–300 children were born to POWs and Finnish women. These women's backgrounds varied: some were unmarried, while others were widowed by the war. Some relationships were adulterous, as some of the women were married to Finnish soldiers who were absent at the time. The usage of condoms was scarce, partially due to the lack of their availability to POWs, and partially due to the lack of rural Finnish women's awareness of condom usage. After the Moscow Armistice, Finland started to return the surviving POWs to the Soviet Union, and most of the Finnish mothers that had children with POWs were left as single parents. Some of the mothers married Finnish men afterwards.

Relationships between native women and ethnic Russian POWs were especially disapproved of in Finnish society, much more so than similar relationships with German soldiers and with POWs from other Finnic peoples, such as Karelians. A strong factor behind this greater censure was the long-lasting anti-Russian sentiment in Finland (ryssäviha in Finnish). Some women's heads were shaved for allegedly having relationships with Soviet POWs. Pejorative terms such as ryssän heila (ryssä's girlfriend, the word ryssä being a common Finnish slur for a Russian) and ryssän huora (ryssä's whore) were widely used. The children fathered by Soviet POWs also faced discrimination in their youth, such as bullying in school.

==== Swedish volunteers ====
Overall there were about 11,000 Swedish volunteers who fought for Finland at some point during wartime. During the Winter War, Swedish volunteers numbered 9,640 and between 1941 and 1944, there were over 1,600 Swedish volunteers, of which about a third had previously participated in the Winter War. About 100 children were born to Finnish women and Swedish volunteers. Often these women moved to Sweden with their children.

=== Greece ===
Little is known about the Greek Wehrmacht children, since it is still an issue surrounded by taboo in Greece, but Greek children of Wehrmacht soldiers are known to have been subjected to public humiliation. Frequently, they were called "Germanobastardos" (Greek for "German bastard"). The mothers were discriminated against as well, and the children suffered both due to having a stigmatized mother and frequently an unknown father. Quite often, the mothers blamed the children for their bad situation. There is no official record of these children, but researchers estimate their number to be at least 200. The relatively low number, some authors argue, was because only a small proportion of pregnancies resulted in births, due to the mothers' fears of discrimination. Abortions were easily accessible in Greece at that time, and it is claimed that the Orthodox Church encouraged silence on the matter and assisted women in obtaining abortions.

=== Netherlands ===
The Nazis considered the women of the Netherlands to be Aryan and acceptable for fraternization by German soldiers. The Dutch Institute for War Documentation originally estimated that around 10,000 children by German fathers were born to Dutch mothers during the occupation. However, recent figures, based on newly available records at the archives of the German Wehrmacht (name of the German armed forces from 1935 to 1945), indicate that the true number could be as high as 50,000.

=== Vietnam ===
Some Japanese soldiers married Vietnamese women like Nguyen Thi Xuan and Nguyen Thi Thu and fathered multiple children with the Vietnamese women who remained behind in Vietnam while the Japanese soldiers themselves returned to Japan in 1955. The official Vietnamese historical narrative view them as children of rape and prostitution. The Japanese forced Vietnamese women to become comfort women and with Burmese, Indonesian, Thai and Filipino women they made up a notable portion of Asian comfort women in general. Japanese use of Malaysian and Vietnamese women as comfort women was corroborated by testimonies. There were comfort women stations in Malaysia, Indonesia, Philippines, Burma, Thailand, Cambodia, Vietnam, North Korea and South Korea. Out of these relations a number of children were born that were later abandoned by their Japanese fathers after the war, while a large number of soldiers would also remain behind in Vietnam, married Vietnamese women, and raised families.

In 1954, the Vietnamese government ordered the Japanese soldiers to return home. They were “encouraged” to leave their families behind, effectively abandoning their war children in Vietnam.

The half-Japanese children left behind in Vietnam after 1954 were subjected to harsh discrimination; meanwhile these children were often raised by single mothers who were harshly criticised for sleeping with Japanese soldiers during the war.

In 2017 the Japanese Emperor Akihito and his wife Empress Michiko visited Hanoi as at the time Japan had become the largest donor of aid to Vietnam and a top investor into the country. As a part of the official visit Emperor Akihito met with a number of war children who were abandoned after the war ended.

== Post-war children ==
=== Fathered by Allied forces in Germany ===
The Allied forces occupied Germany for several years after World War II. The book GIs and Fräuleins, by Maria Hohn, documents 66,000 German children born to fathers who were soldiers of Allied forces in the period 1945–55:

- American parent: 36,334
- French parent: 10,188
- British parent: 8,397
- Soviet parent: 3,105
- Belgian parent: 1,767
- Other/unknown: 6,829

==== American ====
According to Perry Biddiscombe, more than 37,000 illegitimate children were fathered by American fathers in the 10 years following the German surrender (in general agreement with Hohn's numbers cited above). Locals generally disapproved of any relations between the occupation forces and German and Austrian women. Not only were the Americans the recent enemy, but the residents feared the American fathers would abandon the mothers and children to be cared for by the local communities, which were severely impoverished after the war. A majority of the 37,000 illegitimate children ended up as wards of the social services for at least some time. Many of the children remained wards of the state for a long time, especially children of African-American fathers. The mixed-race children, called "brown children", were seldom adopted in what was then a very racially homogeneous country. Around 5,000 of these children were born. Arrangements were made for some such children to be adopted by African-American couples or families in the United States.

The food situation in occupied Germany was initially very dire. By the spring of 1946, the official ration in the US zone was no more than 1,275 calories per day (much less than the minimum required to maintain health), with some areas probably receiving as little as 700. Thousands of US soldiers exploited this desperate situation to their advantage, using their ample supply of food and cigarettes (the currency of the black market) as what became known as "frau bait" achieving survival sex. Each side continued to view the other as the enemy, even while exchanging food for sex. The often destitute mothers of the resulting children usually received no alimony.

Between 1950 and 1955, the Allied High Commission for Germany prohibited "proceedings to establish paternity or liability for maintenance of children." Even after the lifting of the ban, West German courts had little power to gain child support from American soldiers.

An unknown number exceeding 10,000 children of African American soldiers was born to British and European women through 1955. Generically, they were called Brown Babies, but were referred to in various ways in the countries in which most were born: England, Germany and Austria. A very small number was born in the Netherlands, but a 21st-century oral history project there, "The Children of African American Liberators," provided an in-depth understanding of their lives into adulthood. As well, in 2016 the Folklore Museum of Vienna mounted a thorough exhibition, "Black Austria. The Children of African American Occupation Soldiers."

In the earliest stages of the occupation, American soldiers were not allowed to pay maintenance for children they admitted having fathered, the military classifying any such assistance as "aiding the enemy". Marriages between white US soldiers and Austrian women were prohibited until January 1946, and with German women until December 1946.

The official United States policy on war children was summed up in the Stars and Stripes on 8 April 1946, in the article "Pregnant Frauleins Are Warned!":

Girls who are expecting a child fathered by an American soldier will be provided with no assistance by the American Army ... If the soldier denies paternity, no further action will be undertaken other than to merely inform the woman of this fact. She is to be advised to seek help from a German or Austrian welfare organization. If the soldier is already in the United States, his address is not to be communicated to the woman in question, the soldier may be honorably discharged from the army and his demobilization will in no way be delayed. Claims for child support from unmarried German and Austrian mothers will not be recognized. If the soldier voluntarily acknowledges paternity, he is to provide for the woman in an appropriate manner.

==== British ====
British troops also occupied a portion of what later was organized as West Germany. Fraternisation between soldiers and local German women was discouraged by British authorities because of the status of Germans as the enemy during the war.

Notable children of British servicemen and German mothers include Lewis Holtby, Kevin Kerr, Maik Taylor and David McAllister.

==== Canadian ====
Canada declared war on Germany in 1939, following Britain's war declaration the week before. During the war Canadian forces participated in the Allied invasions of both Italy and Normandy. Before the invasion of continental Europe, a significant number of Canadian forces were stationed in Britain.

An estimated 22,000 children were born to British mothers and Canadian soldiers stationed in Britain. In continental Europe, it has been estimated that 6,000 were born to Canadian fathers in the Netherlands, with smaller numbers born in Belgium and other places where Canadian forces were stationed during and after the war.

A famous example is Eric Clapton.

=== In the following countries ===
==== Netherlands ====
On liberation, many Dutch women welcomed the Allied troops and had relationships that resulted in babies; these babies were called "liberation babies". It is estimated that about 4,000 liberation babies were fathered by Canadian soldiers before they left the area in early 1946.

==== Austria ====
In Austria, war children (Russenkind) by known Soviet fathers of the occupation were discriminated against, as were their mothers.

The Austrians also resented women who had relations with American soldiers, calling them "Yanks' chicks" (Amischickse) or "dollar sluts" (Dollarflitscherl) and, in the case of those who had relations with black soldiers, "chocolate girls" (Schokoladenmädchen). In April 1946, the Stars and Stripes newspaper warned "pregnant Fräuleins" that military authorities would provide no assistance to them or their children if the fathers were US soldiers. The paper said that a "'Strength Through Joy' girl who ate from the forbidden fruit should accept the consequences," referring to a Nazi slogan.

In coordination with American groups, an Austrian welfare program was started after the war to send the mixed-race children of Austrian/African-American parents to the United States for adoption by African-American families. The children by then ranged in age from 4 to 7 years.

== Amerasians ==
Probably more than 100,000 children have been born to Asian mothers and US servicemen in Asia. This occurred chiefly during World War II, the Korean War, and the Vietnam War. Collectively these children are known as Amerasians, a term coined by the author Pearl S. Buck.

== Lai Đại Hàn ==
The term Lai Dai Han (or sometimes Lai Daihan/Lai Tai Han) is a Vietnamese term for a mixed ancestry person born to a South Korean father and a Vietnamese mother, including the victims of sexual assault by Korean soldiers, during the Vietnam War. Lai Dai Han often live at the margins of Vietnamese society.

The exact number of Lai Daihan is unknown. According to Busan Ilbo, there are at least 5,000 and as many as 30,000.

== Eurasians ==
Numerous Asian-European children were also born during the colonial years of the British, French, and Dutch administrations in India and various Southeast Asian countries. In many cases, the father was a colonial civil servant, settler or military officer based in the occupied Asian country while the mother was a local. The term "Eurasian" is used but has variants depending on country of origin and nationality of the parents. Examples include the Indos in Indonesia, Burghers (Portuguese or Dutch) in Sri Lanka, Kristang (usually Portuguese) in Malaysia and Goans (Portuguese) and Anglo-Indians (British) in India.

== Cases of rape ==
Numerous war children were born as the result of their mothers being raped by enemy forces during World War II. Military rape of conquered women has been practiced in numerous conflicts throughout human history. Recent examples include during the longstanding wars in the Congo and Sudan.

=== Former Yugoslavia ===
In the 1990s organizations were formed to classify such violence against women as among the prosecutable war crimes in former Yugoslavia. Some Muslim women in Bosnia who were raped in Serbian camps were aided by humanitarian organizations.

== Situation of mothers, war children and fathers ==
=== Prevention ===
The recognition in 1989 that violence against women in the form of rape was a deliberate military strategy and human rights abuse led to the approval of an international Convention on the Rights of the Child. Since 2008, the United Nations Security Council bans such sexual violations, defining them as a war crime. The German weekly Die Zeit described this action as an historical milestone.

=== Integration ===
One author suggested that adoption and assimilation of a child into a new family might be a solution to prevent war children from growing up as unwanted and mobbed by people in a hostile environment.

=== War children's ignorance of origins ===
Often war children never understood the reason they were being isolated or mistreated. They did not learn their father's identities until late in life or by chance:

- by comments of their classmates, relatives or neighbours
- when they needed official documents e. g. family register, or
- after their mothers died.

In most cases, when war children tried to learn identities of their biological fathers years later, the searches were usually difficult and often in vain.

=== Fathers unknown ===
Occupation forces after World War II strictly interdicted fraternization by military personnel with people of the occupied territories. Couples who became involved tried to hide their relationship because of these interdictions and the resentment and disapproval by the occupied population. Fathers of war children were generally excepted from civil actions by mothers to claim alimony or child support.

Communication with the mothers of war children often ceased when the soldiers suddenly were reassigned, often without time to say goodbye. Some of the soldiers were killed in action. In the post-war period, soldier fathers were prevented by conditions from returning to former native women and war children even if they wanted to. Others had wives and families to return to at home, and denied having war children. In some cases, they never knew they had sired children when serving abroad.

=== Mothers traumatized ===
At the end of war, mothers with war children were prosecuted as criminals and punished in humiliating ways for their relations with the enemy. They were isolated socially and economically. Many of them could only rehabilitate themselves and become respected by marrying a fellow countryman. Long-term persecution of a former girlfriend of a German soldier is documented in a book by ANEG; she says that she was traumatized for the rest of her life.

Some of the mothers gave their war child to a home of public welfare. Others tried to integrate the child into the family formed with their new partner and children (step family). Some of the mothers died during the war.

== Children in search for their fathers ==
A network of European war children, "Born of War — international network", was founded in October 2005. They meet every year in Berlin to assist each other, make decisions about searching for parents, and find out new positions.

=== Searches by war children of World War II ===
==== Changing opinions ====
Since the late 20th century, as they reach retirement age, many war children from World War II have begun to search for their full identity and their roots. The legal children of a German father may also be interested in contacting the previously unknown war child of their father, if they know one or more exists. Public opinion has become more compassionate toward the past generation of war children. Few of the biological fathers are still alive. Subject to bullying and humiliation, many of the mothers never told their children about their foreign fathers.

==== Norway ====
The government has advised that persons trying to do research should gather the complete birth documents, including the birth certificate (not only parts of it). The Norwegian archive at Victoria Terrasse in Oslo burned down in the 1950s, and many of these important documents were lost. The Norwegian Red Cross has some records. It is often easier to trace the Norwegian mother first by Church records.

==== Belgium ====
The government and researchers recommend that persons search for documentary evidence from Nationalsozialistische Volkswohlfahrt, Auslandsorganisation – Amt für Volkswohlfahrt und Winterhilfswerk (1941–1944) about alimony payments. Old photographs with greetings on the back or private letters may provide clues to a father's identity.

==== France ====
Since 2005 the society, Amicale Nationale des Enfants de la Guerre (ANEG), has worked in both France and Germany to help descendants of parents of mixed nationalities, whether a German father in France or French father in occupied Germany. Cœurs Sans Frontières/Herzen ohne Grenzen (Hearts without Frontiers) is another French / German organization supporting the search for family members of French children whose fathers were German soldiers during the occupation and German or Austrian children whose fathers were prisoners, forced laborers or French soldiers in the immediate post-war period.

==== Germany ====
Mixed children of white German women and black WWI soldiers were called "Rhineland Bastards". This phrase, along with many other racial epithets, reinforced a negative stereotype that black men were beasts and did not care for their children. The "Brown Babies" became an international concern, with the African-American press publicizing and advertising for adoptions. In these efforts there was a distinct emphasis in both countries on the skin color of the child (for example: advertised as "Brown Babies" rather than simply as "orphans"). This was important because a dark skin color both excluded children from German national identity, and allowed them more acceptance in the United States than was offered to light-skinned "German" babies. This distinction was further emphasized when "Brown Babies" who were adopted into the US were afterwards forbidden from speaking their native German. This served efforts to erase an entire generation of Afro-Germans.

Since 2009 the German government has granted German citizenship upon application and documentation by war children who were born in France to French mothers and German soldier fathers in WWII.

==== Search in German archives ====
Several central files are part of the German archives:

- At Deutsche Dienststelle (WASt), military movements of German soldiers of World War II can be traced. Children in search of their German fathers (soldiers, prisoners of Second World War) may find some clues here.
- German Federal Archives-Military Archives (in German: Bundesarchiv-Militärarchiv) in Freiburg im Breisgau has some copies of personal documents. For each unit of the former Wehrmacht, it has the so-called "Kriegstagebücher" (reports of daily events) where movements, and losses per day and unit were recorded.
- Archives of former Berlin Document Center contained details on personal membership in Nazi party and organisations of the German Third Reich. These archives were transferred to German Federal Archives, branch Berlin-Lichterfelde. Search for people concerned are allowed 30 years after death. Details needed are surname, first name, date of birth, occupation and range of activities.
- The Volksbund Deutsche Kriegsgräberfürsorge has a direct access file, with a searchable online database, of all known German war graves of World War I and II.

=== Post-war children ===
Post-war war children often search in vain: their knowledge of their father's personal data may be vague, some archives are closed, and much data has been lost.

==== Search for US fathers ====
War children by American soldiers may gain assistance in their search from the organization GITrace. Since 2009 the German-based association, GI Babies Germany e.V., also assists in the search for the roots of children of German mothers and GIs in the occupation.

==== Search for Canadian fathers ====
Organization Canadian Roots UK helps war children in Great Britain to trace a Canadian father. Conversely it also helps Canadian veteran fathers to trace a child born in the UK during or shortly after WWII.

== In popular culture ==
- Toxi (1952), West German drama film about the mixed-race war baby of an African-American soldier and a German woman
- Freitag, Susanne; Döbber, Claudia (2007), Feindeskind. Mein Vater war ein deutscher Soldat [Enemies' child. My father was a German soldier] (in German), Paris: ZDF-Studios. Shown by German TV: Phoenix on 2 January 2010, 14h–14h45. (Wehrmachtsauskunftsstelle Berlin, discrimination of mothers and children, French association of war children ANEG, family reunion of siblings with common German father, with corresponding French mother or corresponding German mother).
- betrifft. Besatzungskinder [Ref.: War children] (in German). Shown by regional German TV SWR/SR on 2 December 2009, 20h15–21h. Meeting of German-French children stemming from a German soldier stationed in France, or vice versa from a French father stationed in Germany, search for their fathers. Interview with the president of French association of war children ANEG.
- A Woman in Berlin (2008), post-war drama based on an anonymous journal, about German women struggling to survive during the Russian invasion and occupation
- Two Lives (2012), German drama film written and directed by Georg Maas about adult war children being recruited as Stasi agents and sent to Norway to be reunited with their "birth" mothers by claiming places of children who were sent away for adoption. Starring Juliane Köhler and Liv Ullmann and the official German entry in the 2013 Academy Awards, it is based on a novel by Hannelore Hippe.

== See also ==
- PTSD in children and adolescents
- War bride
  - Brides of the Islamic State
- War rape
  - Children born as a result of rape
- War widow
- Impact of war on children
- Bicultural identity
- Rhineland bastards
- Non-paternity event
- Festival children
