= Finland in World War II =

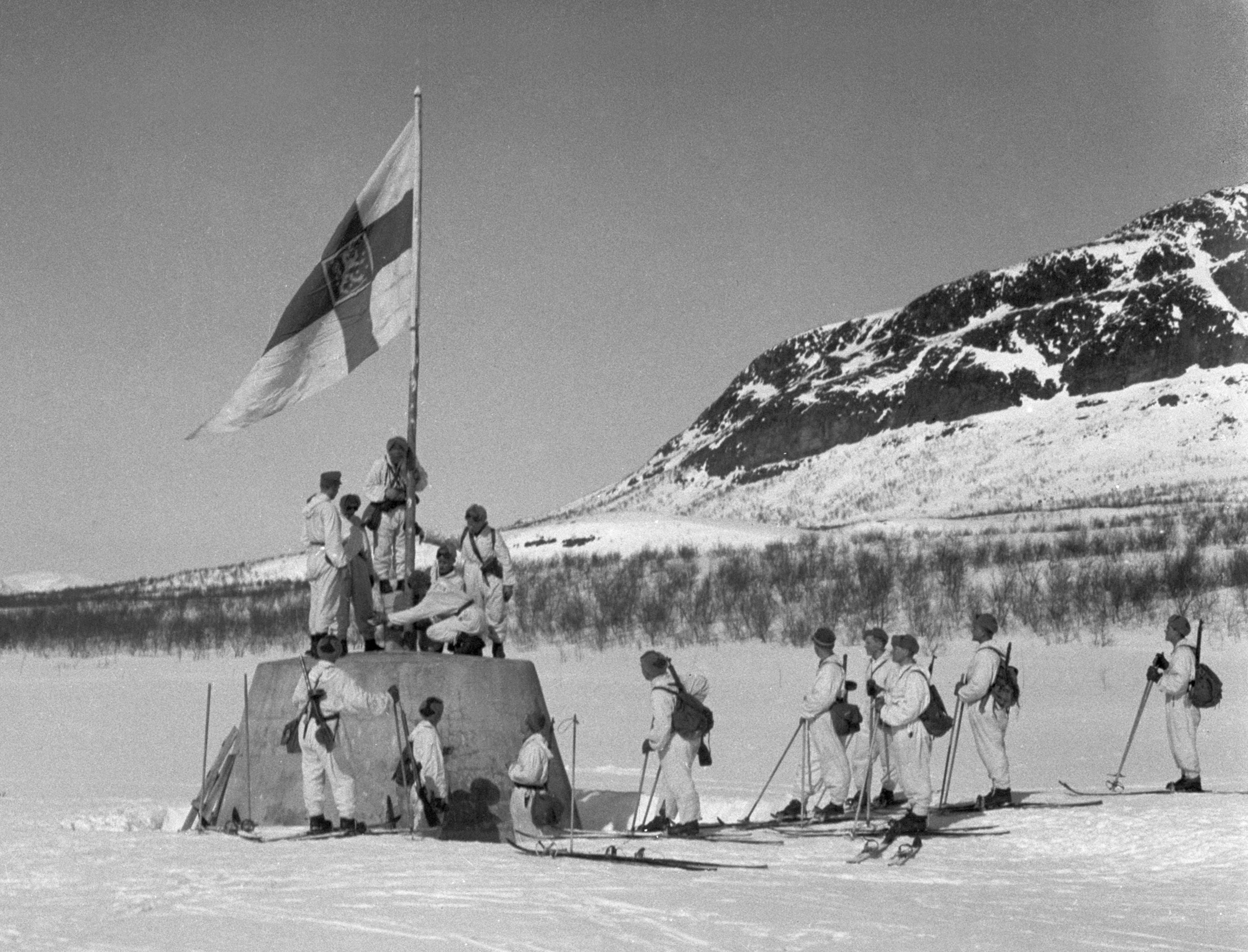
Finnish soldiers raise the flag at the three-country cairn between Norway, Sweden, and Finland on 27 April 1945, which marked the end of World War II in Finland.

Finland participated in the Second World War initially in a defensive war against the Soviet Union, followed by another, this time offensive, war against the Soviet Union acting in concert with Nazi Germany, and then finally fighting alongside the Allies against Germany.

The first two major conflicts in which Finland was directly involved were the defensive Winter War against an invasion by the Soviet Union in 1939, followed by the offensive Continuation War, together with Germany and the other Axis powers against the Soviets, in 1941–1944. The third conflict, the Lapland War against Germany in 1944–1945, followed the signing of the Moscow Armistice with the Allied Powers, which stipulated the expulsion of Nazi German forces from Finnish territory.

The Soviet attempt to conquer Finland in the Winter War was thwarted, and by the end of World War II, Finland remained an independent country. Finland ceded approximately 10% of its territory to the Soviet Union, including Viipuri (Finland's second-largest city [Population Register] or fourth-largest city [Church and Civil Register], depending on the census data). Finland was also required to pay out a large amount of war reparations to the Soviet Union and to formally acknowledge partial responsibility for the Continuation War. Finnish political policy during the Cold War aimed to appease the Soviet Union to maintain good relations.

== Background ==
=== Finnish independence ===
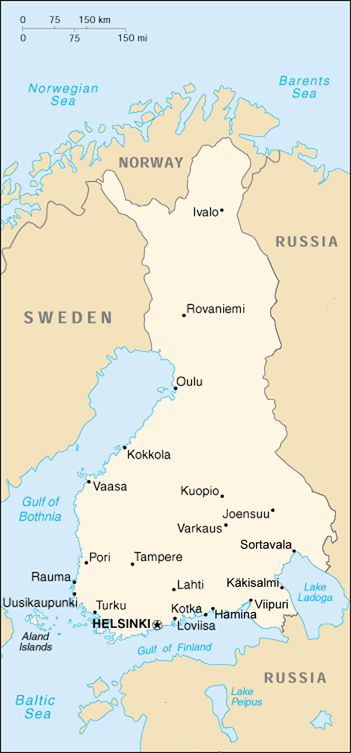
The Grand Duchy of Finland, as the country was named until 1917

In 1809, the Russian Empire seized Finland from Sweden in the Finnish War. Finland entered a personal union with the Russian Empire as a grand duchy with extensive autonomy.

On 6 December 1917, during the Russian Civil War, the Finnish parliament (Suomen Eduskunta) declared independence from Russia, a declaration that was accepted by the Bolshevik government of the Soviet Union on 31 December. In January 1918, the Eduskunta ordered General Gustaf Mannerheim to use local Finnish White Guards to disarm Finnish Red Guards and Russian troops throughout the country, a process which began on 27 January and led to the beginning of the Finnish Civil War.

After the Eastern Front and the collapse of peace negotiations between the Bolsheviks and Germany, German troops intervened in Finland, occupying Helsinki and other parts of the country. The Red faction was defeated, and the survivors were subjected to a reign of terror, in which at least 12,000 people died. A new government, with Juho Kusti Paasikivi as prime minister, pursued a pro-German policy and sought to annex Russian Karelia, which had a Finnish-speaking majority, despite never having been a part of Finland.

=== Treaty of Tartu: 1920 ===
After the extinction of the Hohenzollern monarchy on 9 November 1918, Poland, Estonia, Latvia, and Lithuania became independent, German troops left Finland, and British ships patrolled the Baltic Sea. Mannerheim was elected regent by the Eduskunta, and Finnish policy became pro-Entente as the western powers intervened in the Russian Civil War (7 November 1917 – 16 June 1923). Mannerheim favoured intervention against the Bolsheviks, but suspicion of the White Russians who refused to recognise Finnish independence led to his aggressive policy being overruled; then, the Bolshevik victory in Russia forestalled Finnish hostilities.

Paasikivi led a delegation to Tartu, in Estonia, with instructions to establish a frontier from Lake Ladoga in the south, via Lake Onega to the White Sea in the north. The importance of the Murmansk railway, built in 1916, led the Soviet delegation to reject the Finnish border proposal, and the treaty of 14 October 1920 recognised a border agreement in which Finland obtained the northern port of Petsamo (Pechenga), an outlet to the Arctic Ocean, and a border roughly the same as that of the former Grand Duchy of Finland. Claims on areas of Eastern Karelia were abandoned, and the Soviets accepted that the south-eastern border would not be moved west of Petrograd.

== Winter War ==
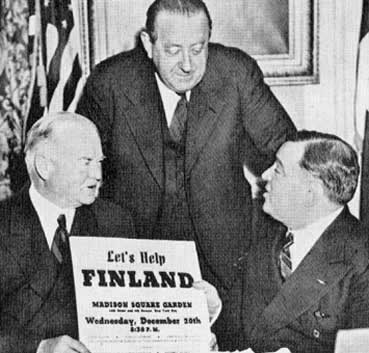
Sympathy service on 20 December 1939 in New York: left to right: former President Herbert Hoover, Hendrik Willem van Loon and New York City Mayor Fiorello LaGuardia

During the Interwar period, relations between Finland and the Soviet Union were tense. Some elements in Finland maintained the dream of a "Greater Finland" which included the Soviet-controlled part of Karelia, while the proximity of the Finnish border to Leningrad (now Saint Petersburg) caused worry among the Soviet leadership. On 23 August 1939, Nazi Germany and the Soviet Union signed the Molotov–Ribbentrop Pact, which included a secret clause demarcating Finland as part of the Soviet sphere of influence.

On 12 October, the Soviet Union began negotiations with Finland regarding the disposition of the Karelian Isthmus, the Hanko Peninsula, and various islands in the Gulf of Finland, all of which the Finns considered Finnish territory. No agreement was reached. On 26 November, the Soviet Union accused the Finnish army of shelling the village of Mainila. Later research indicates that the Soviets had, in fact, shelled their own village in order to create a pretext for withdrawal from their non-aggression pact with Finland. On 30 November 1939, the Soviet Union attacked Finland. The attack was denounced by the League of Nations, and as a result, the Soviet Union was expelled from that body on 14 December.

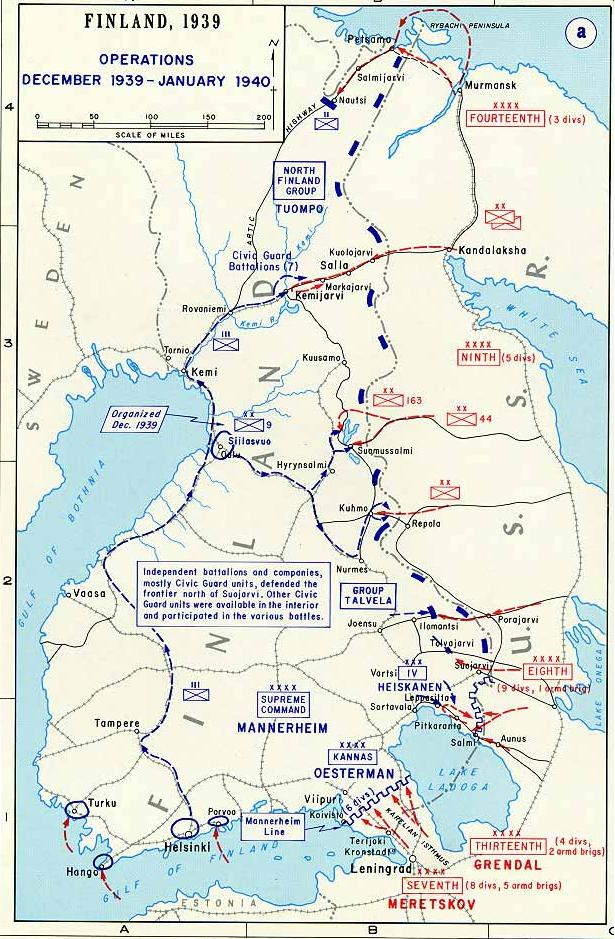
First phase of the Winter war

The aim of the invasion was to liberate the 'Red Finns' and eventually annex Finland to the Soviet Union. To this end, a puppet government, the Finnish Democratic Republic, was established in Terijoki under the leadership of the exiled O. W. Kuusinen. Strategic goals of the Red Army included cutting Finland in half and capturing Petsamo in the north and Helsinki in the south.

The leader of the Leningrad Military District, Andrei Zhdanov, commissioned a celebratory piece from Dmitri Shostakovich, Suite on Finnish Themes, intended to be performed as the marching bands of the Red Army paraded through Helsinki.

The Soviets had been building up their forces on the border during the earlier negotiations and now fielded four armies comprising 16 divisions, with another three being brought into position; meanwhile, the Finnish army had just 9 smaller divisions. The Soviets also enjoyed overwhelming superiority in the number of armour and air units deployed. The Finns had to defend a border that was some 1287 km (800 miles) in length, putting them at a significant disadvantage.

=== First offensive November 1939 ===
The Winter War was fought in two Soviet offensives, divided by a short lull. The war was fought mainly in three areas. The Karelian Isthmus and the area of Lake Ladoga were the primary focus of the Soviet war effort. A two-pronged attack was launched in this region, with one pincer engaging Finnish forces on the Isthmus while the other went around Lake Ladoga to encircle the defenders. This force was then to advance to and capture the city of Viipuri. The second front was in central Karelia, where Soviet forces were to advance to the city of Oulu, cutting the country in half. Finally, a drive from the north was intended to capture the Petsamo region.

The first attack, on 30 November 1939, was an aerial bombardment of Helsinki, with subsidiary attacks along the Finnish-Soviet border. This had the effect of instantly unifying the once deeply-divided Finnish people in defense of their homes and country, without any referendums needing to be held.

By late December, the Soviets had become bogged down, with the two main fronts at a standstill as the Finns counterattacked with greater strength than anticipated. With two of its three offensives having failed by the end of December, Soviet headquarters ordered a cessation of operations. By 27 December, it was observed that the Soviets were digging in on the Karelian Isthmus. In the north, the Finns had been pushed back to Nautsi, but with reinforcements, had been able to take the higher ground and halt the Soviet advance south of Petsamo. During this period, the Finns harassed supply columns and carried out raids against fortified Soviet positions.

A lull followed in January 1940, as the Soviet army reassessed its strategy and rearmed and resupplied. On 29 January, Molotov put an end to the puppet Terijoki Government and recognized the Ryti government as the legal government of Finland, informing it that the USSR was willing to negotiate peace.

=== Second Offensive February 1940 ===
The last phase began in February 1940, with a major artillery barrage that began on the 2nd and lasted until the 11th, accompanied by reconnaissance raids at key objectives. The Soviets, using new equipment and materials, also began using the tactic of rotating troops from the reserve to the front, thus keeping constant pressure on the Finnish defenders. Relative to Finnish resources, the Red Army seemed to have inexhaustible amounts of ammunition and supplies, as attacks were always preceded by barrages, followed by aerial assaults and then random troop movements against the lines. Finnish military and government leaders came to feel that their only hope of preserving their nation lay in negotiating a peace treaty with Moscow.

The tenacity of the Finnish people, both military and civilian, in the face of a superior opponent gained the country much sympathy throughout the world; however, material support from other countries was very limited, as none of Finland's neighbors were willing to commit their militaries to a war against the USSR.

The need for a diplomatic solution became even more apparent after Soviet forces broke through the Finnish defensive line on the Karelian Isthmus and moved on towards Viipuri.

A peace proposal authored by Molotov was sent to Helsinki in mid-February. It placed heavy demands on Finland, including claims to more land for the USSR and the imposition of significant diplomatic and military sanctions. By 28 February, Molotov had turned his offer into an ultimatum with a 48-hour deadline, which pushed the Finnish leadership to act quickly. On 12 March 1940, the Moscow Peace Treaty was signed, with hostilities ending the following day. By the terms of the treaty, Finland ceded 9% of its territory to the USSR. This was more territory than the Soviets had originally demanded.

== Interim peace ==
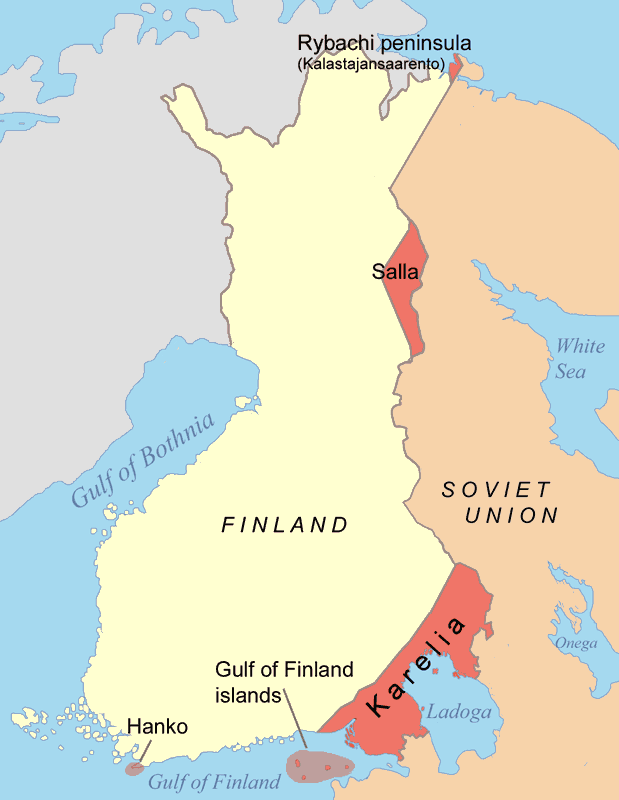
Finland's concessions in the Winter War

The period of peace following the Winter War was widely regarded in Finland as temporary, even when peace was announced in March 1940. A period of frantic diplomatic efforts and rearmament followed. The Soviet Union maintained intense pressure on Finland, thereby hastening Finland's efforts to improve the country's security.

Defensive arrangements were attempted with Sweden and the United Kingdom, but the political and military situation during the Second World War rendered these efforts fruitless. Finland then turned to Nazi Germany for military aid. As the German offensive against the Soviet Union (Operation Barbarossa) approached, the cooperation between the two countries intensified. German troops arrived in Finland and took up positions, mostly in Lapland, from where they would invade the Soviet Union.

== Continuation War ==
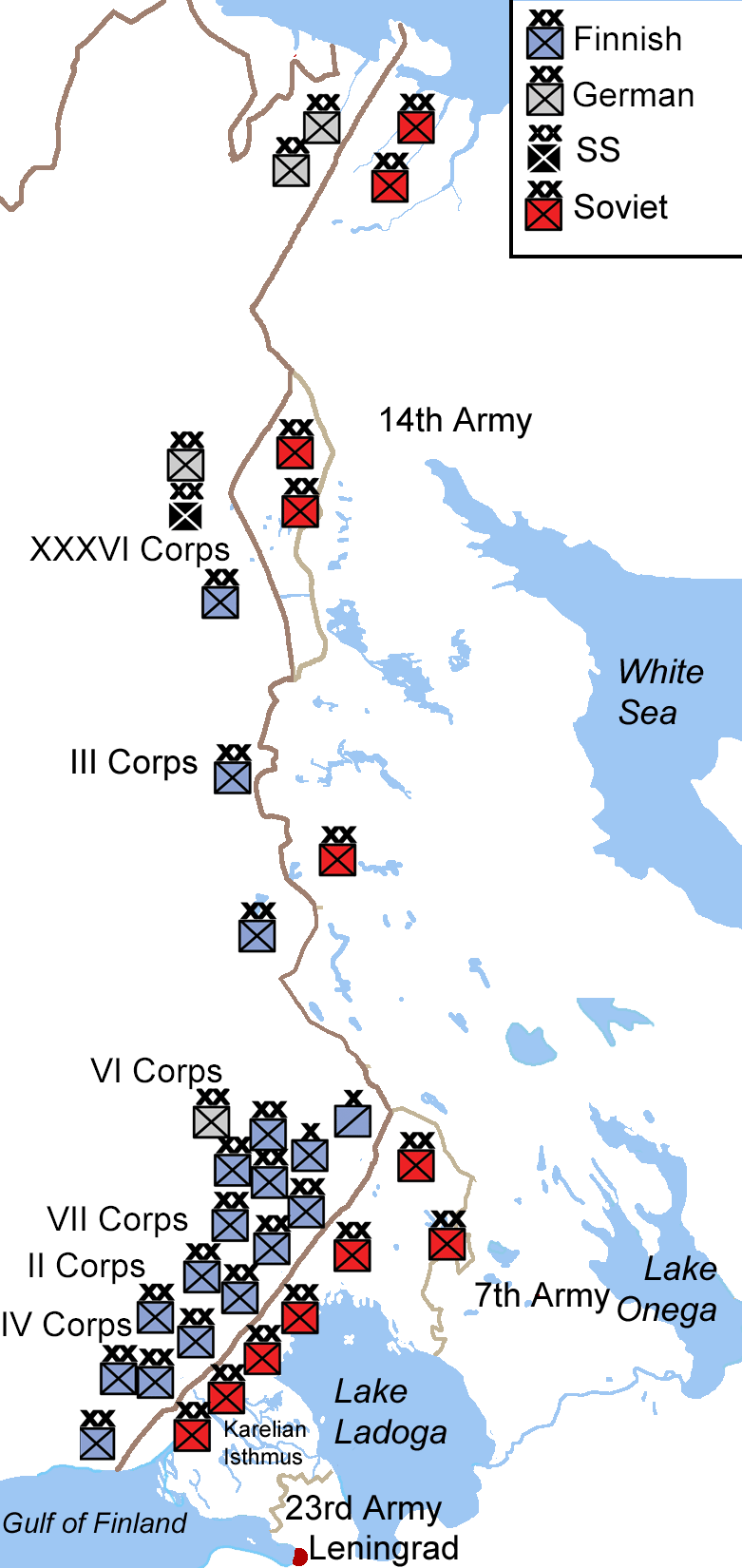
Relative strengths of Finnish, German and Soviet troops at the start of the Continuation War in June 1941

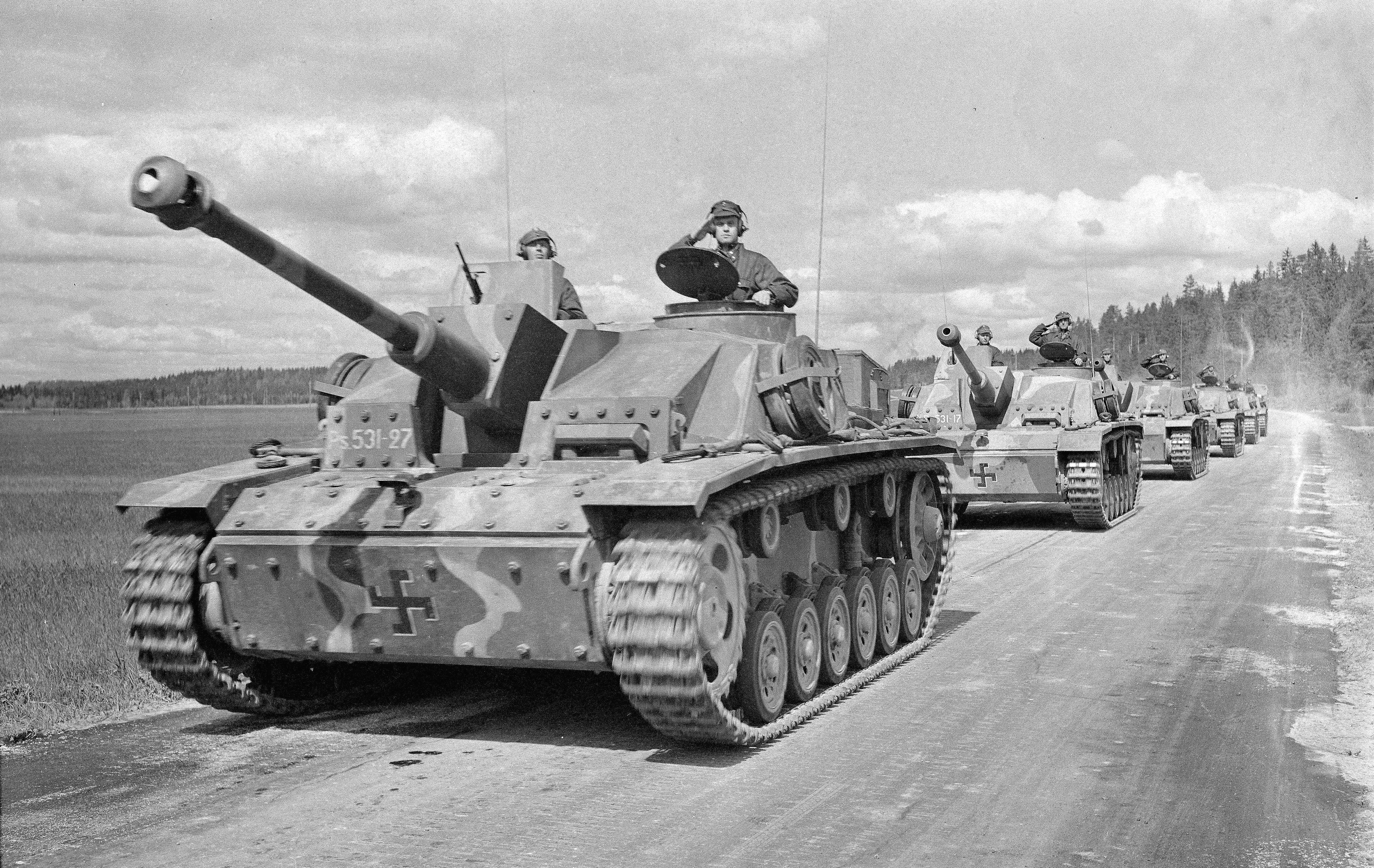
Finnish Armoured Division - Sturmkanone 40 or StuG III Ausf. G (Sturmgeschütz III Ausf. G, "Sturmi"). Photograph was taken on 4 June 1944 during Marshal Mannerheim's birthday parade at Enso, Finland.

On 21 June 1941, Finland began Operation Regatta (Operation Kilpapurjehdus) to deploy troops to the demilitarized Åland Islands. Operation Barbarossa began on 22 June 1941. At 7:15 (Moscow time) the People's Commissar of Defense of the USSR sent a directive to the Soviet armed forces, with orders "Do not carry out raids against Finland and Romania until special instructions". On 25 June, the Soviet Union launched an air raid against Finnish cities, after which Finland declared war and also allowed German troops stationed in Finland to begin offensive warfare. The resulting war was known to the Finns as the Continuation War. During the summer and autumn of 1941, the Finnish Army was on the offensive, retaking the territories lost in the Winter War. The Finnish army also advanced further, especially in the direction of Lake Onega, (east from Lake Ladoga), closing the blockade of the city of Leningrad from the north, and occupying Eastern Karelia, which had many ethnic Finns living there, but had never technically been a part of Finland before.

This led Joseph Stalin to ask U.S. President Franklin D. Roosevelt for help in restoring peaceful relations between Finland and the Soviet Union on 4 August 1941. Finland's refusal of the Soviet offer of territorial concessions in exchange for a peace treaty would later cause Great Britain to declare war on Finland on 6 December (the US maintained diplomatic relations with Finland until the summer of 1944). The German and Finnish troops in Northern Finland were less successful, failing to take the Russian port city of Murmansk during Operation Silver Fox.

On 31 July 1941, the United Kingdom launched Operation EF to demonstrate support for the Soviet Union. These raids were unsuccessful.

In December 1941, the Finnish army took defensive positions. This led to a long period of relative calm on the front line, lasting until 1944. During this period, starting in 1941 but especially after the major German defeat in the Battle of Stalingrad, intermittent peace inquiries took place. These negotiations did not lead to any settlement. In September 1943, a few months after Stalingrad, Finland asserted its independence from Germany by refusing to recognize the puppet Italian Social Republic proclaimed by the Germans in northern Italy.

On 16 March 1944, Roosevelt called for Finland to disassociate itself from Nazi Germany.

On 9 June 1944, the Red Army launched a major strategic offensive against Finland, attaining vast numerical superiority and surprising the Finnish army. This attack pushed the Finnish forces back to approximately the same positions they held at the end of the Winter War. Eventually, the Soviet offensive was brought to a standstill in the Battle of Tali–Ihantala, while still tens or even hundreds of kilometres in front of the main Finnish line of fortifications, the Salpa Line. However, the war had exhausted Finnish resources, and it was believed that the country would not be able to hold against another major attack.

The worsening situation in 1944 led Finnish President Risto Ryti to give Germany his personal guarantee that Finland would not negotiate peace with the Soviet Union for as long as he remained president. In exchange, Germany delivered weapons to the Finns. After the Soviet offensive was halted, however, Ryti resigned. Due to the war, elections could not be held, and therefore the Parliament selected the Marshal of Finland Carl Gustaf Emil Mannerheim, the Finnish commander-in-chief, as president and charged him with negotiating a peace.

The Finnish front had become a sideshow for the Soviet leadership, as they were in a race to reach Berlin before the Western Allies. This, and the heavy casualties inflicted on the Red Army by the Finns, led to the transfer of most troops from the Finnish front. On 4 September 1944, a ceasefire was agreed, and the Moscow Armistice between the Soviet Union and the United Kingdom on one side and Finland on the other was signed on 19 September.

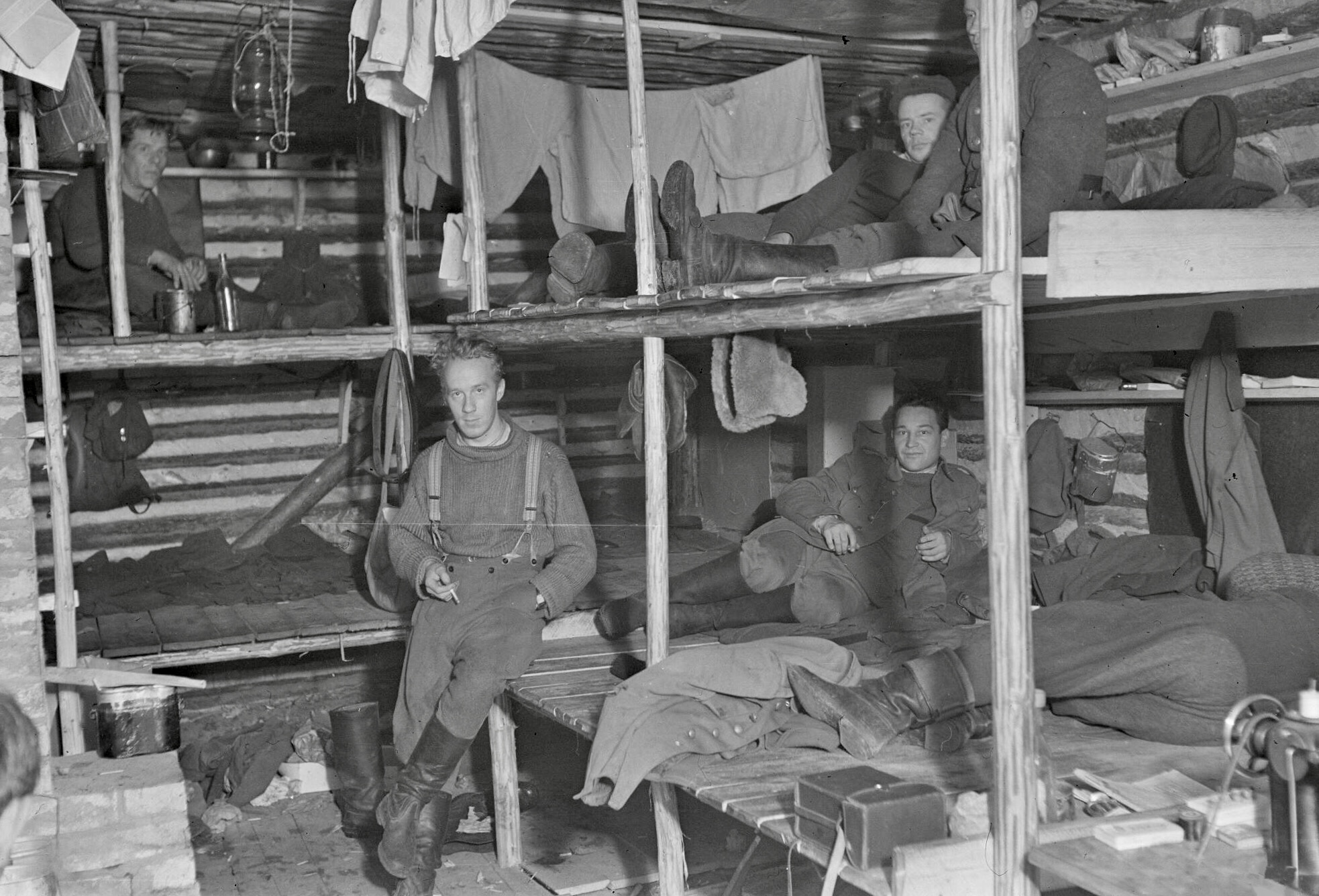
Life in a Finnish dugout (shelter) during the Continuation War

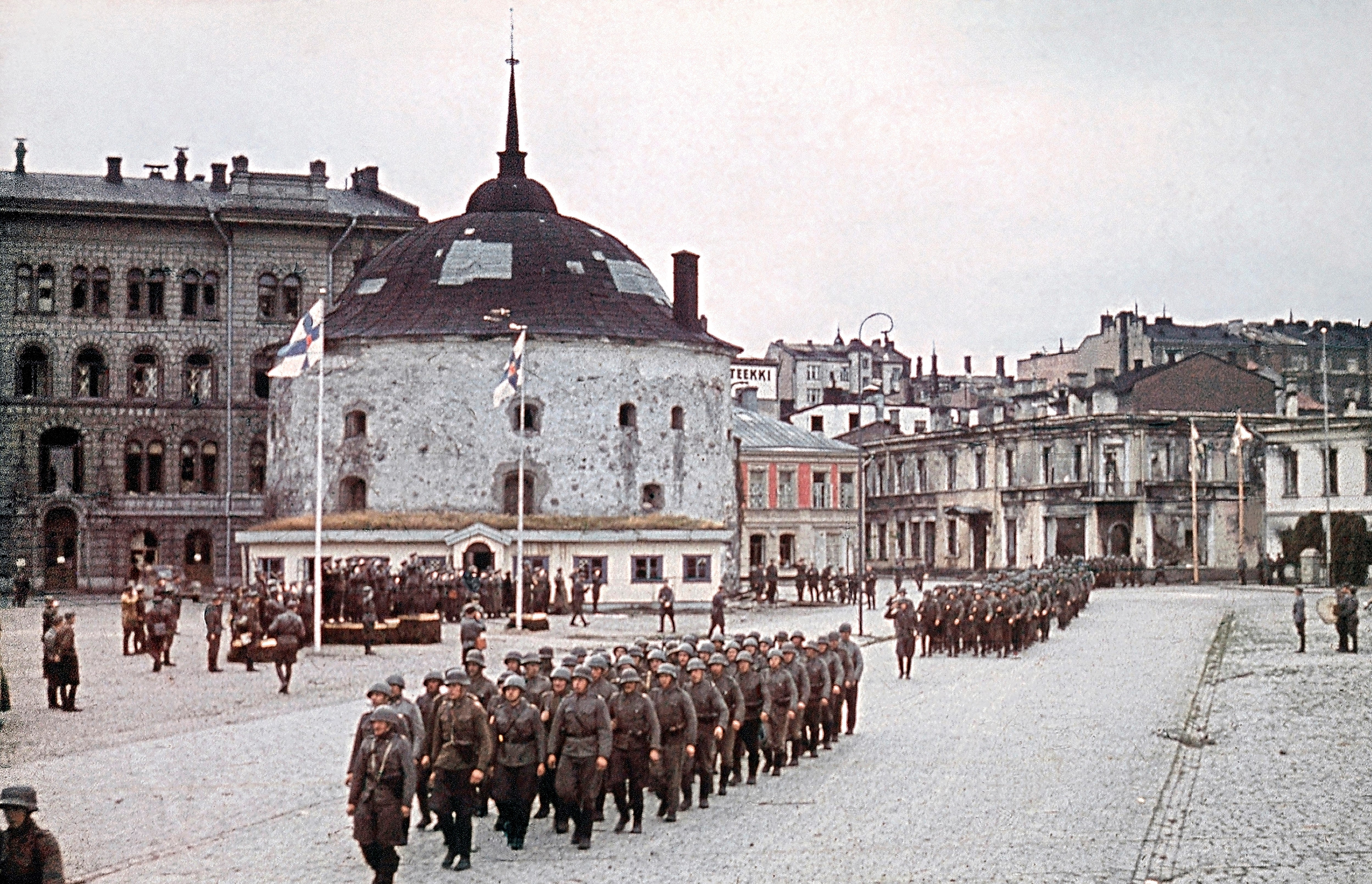
Finnish parade held to celebrate the capture of Vyborg during the Continuation War.

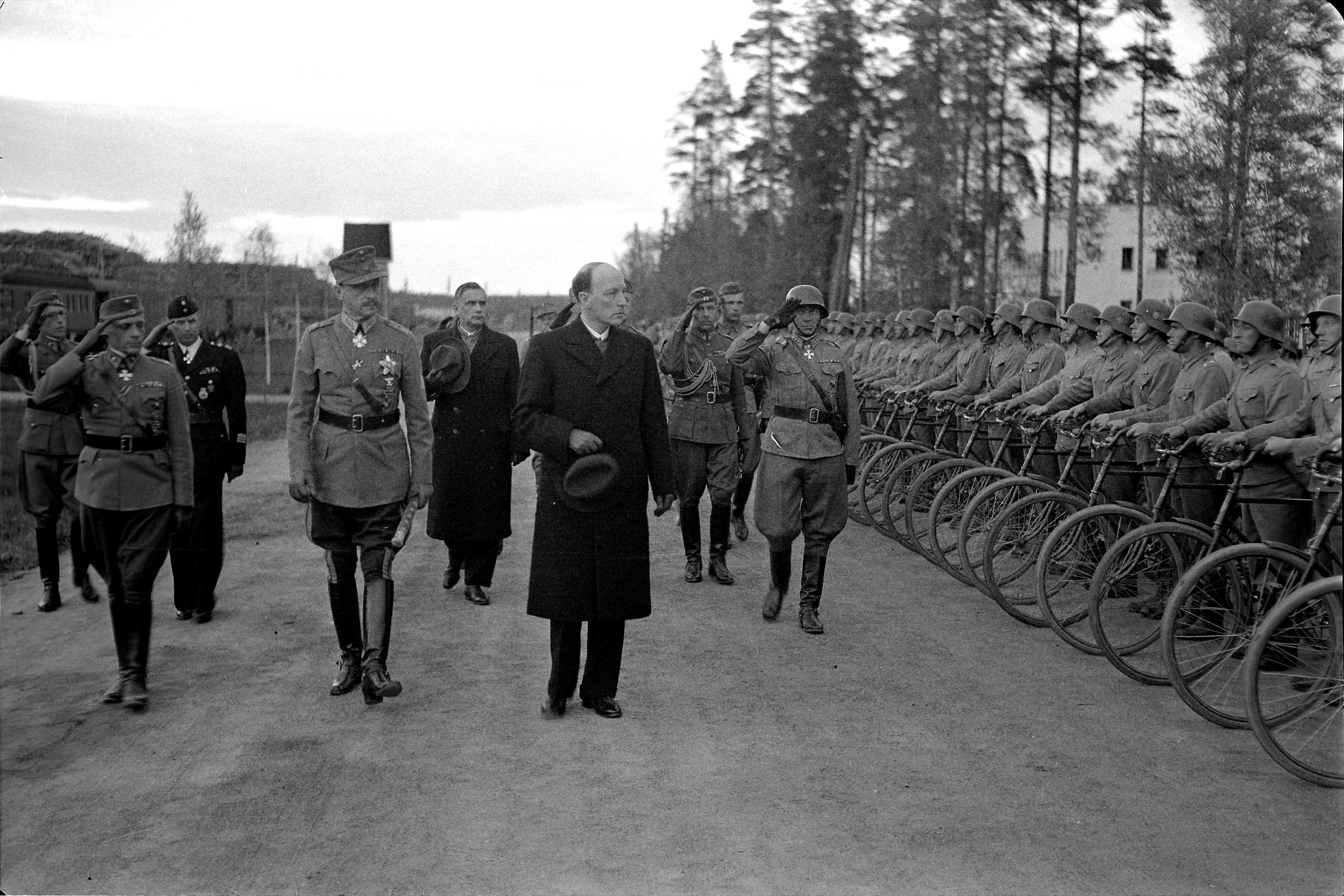
The President of Finland Risto Ryti and Marshal Mannerheim inspect the honorary company.

=== Moscow Armistice ===
The Moscow Armistice was signed by Finland and the Soviet Union on 19 September 1944, ending the Continuation War, though the final peace treaty was not to be signed until 1947 in Paris.

The conditions for peace were similar to those previously agreed upon in the 1940 Moscow Peace Treaty, with Finland forced to cede parts of Finnish Karelia, part of Salla, and islands in the Gulf of Finland. The new armistice also handed the whole of Petsamo over to the Soviet Union. Finland also agreed to legalize communist parties and ban fascist organizations. Finally, the armistice required Finland to expel German troops from its territory, which led to the Lapland War.

== Lapland War ==
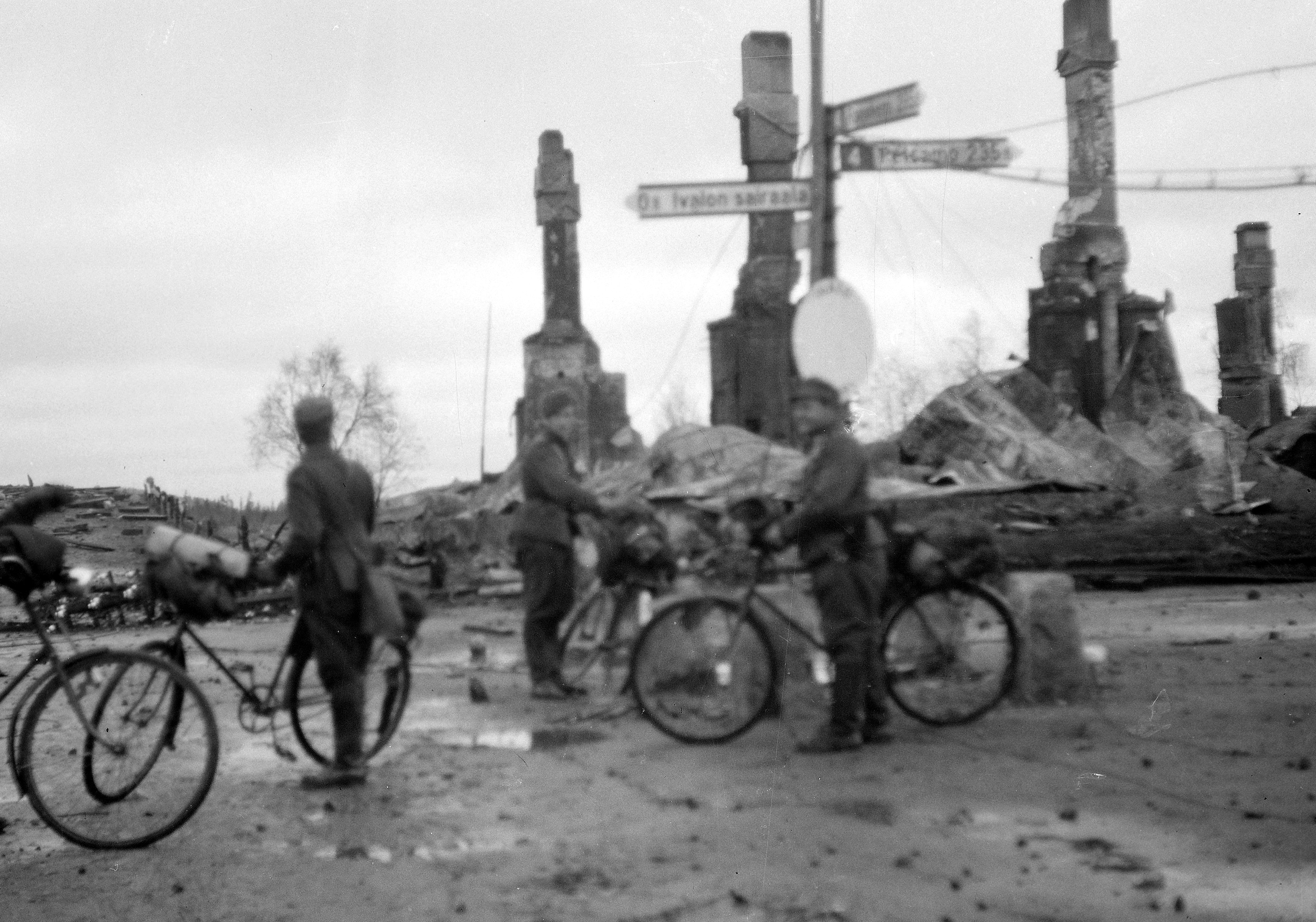
The village of Ivalo was destroyed by the Germans during their retreat as part of their scorched earth policy.

The Lapland War was fought between Finland and Nazi Germany in Lapland, the northernmost part of Finland. Germany's main strategic interest in the region was the nickel mines in the Petsamo area.

Initially, the warfare was cautious on both sides, reflecting the two countries' previous cooperation against their common enemy, but towards the end of 1944, the fighting intensified. Finland and Germany had made an informal agreement and schedule for German troops to withdraw from Lapland to Norway. The Soviet Union did not accept this "friendliness" and pressured Finland to take a more active role in expelling the Germans from Lapland, thereby intensifying hostilities.

The Germans adopted a scorched-earth policy and proceeded to lay waste to the entire northern half of the country as they retreated. Around 100,000 people lost their homes, adding to the burden of post-war reconstruction. The actual loss of life, however, was relatively light. Finland lost approximately 1,000 troops, and Germany lost about 2,000. The Finnish army expelled the last of the foreign troops from Finland in April 1945.

== Post-war ==
The war caused great damage to infrastructure and the economy. From the autumn of 1944, the Finnish army and navy conducted numerous mine clearance operations, particularly in Karelia, Lapland, and the Gulf of Finland. Sea mine clearance activities lasted until 1950. The mines caused many military and civilian casualties, particularly in Lapland.

As part of the Paris Peace Treaty, Finland was classified as an ally of Nazi Germany, bearing responsibility for the war. The treaty imposed heavy war reparations on Finland and stipulated the lease of the Porkkala area near the Finnish capital Helsinki as a military base for fifty years. The reparations were initially thought to be crippling for the economy, but a determined effort was made to pay them. The Soviet Union reduced the reparations by 25% in 1948, and Finland paid them off in 1952. Porkkala was returned to Finnish control in 1956.

In subsequent years, Finland's position was unique in the Cold War. The country was heavily influenced by the Soviet Union, but was the only country on the Soviet pre-World War II border to retain democracy and a market economy. Finland entered into the Agreement of Friendship, Cooperation, and Mutual Assistance (YYA Treaty) with the Soviet Union, under which the Soviet Union agreed to Finland's neutral status. Arms purchases were balanced between East and West until the fall of the Soviet Union.

== Assessment ==
=== Finland and Nazi Germany ===
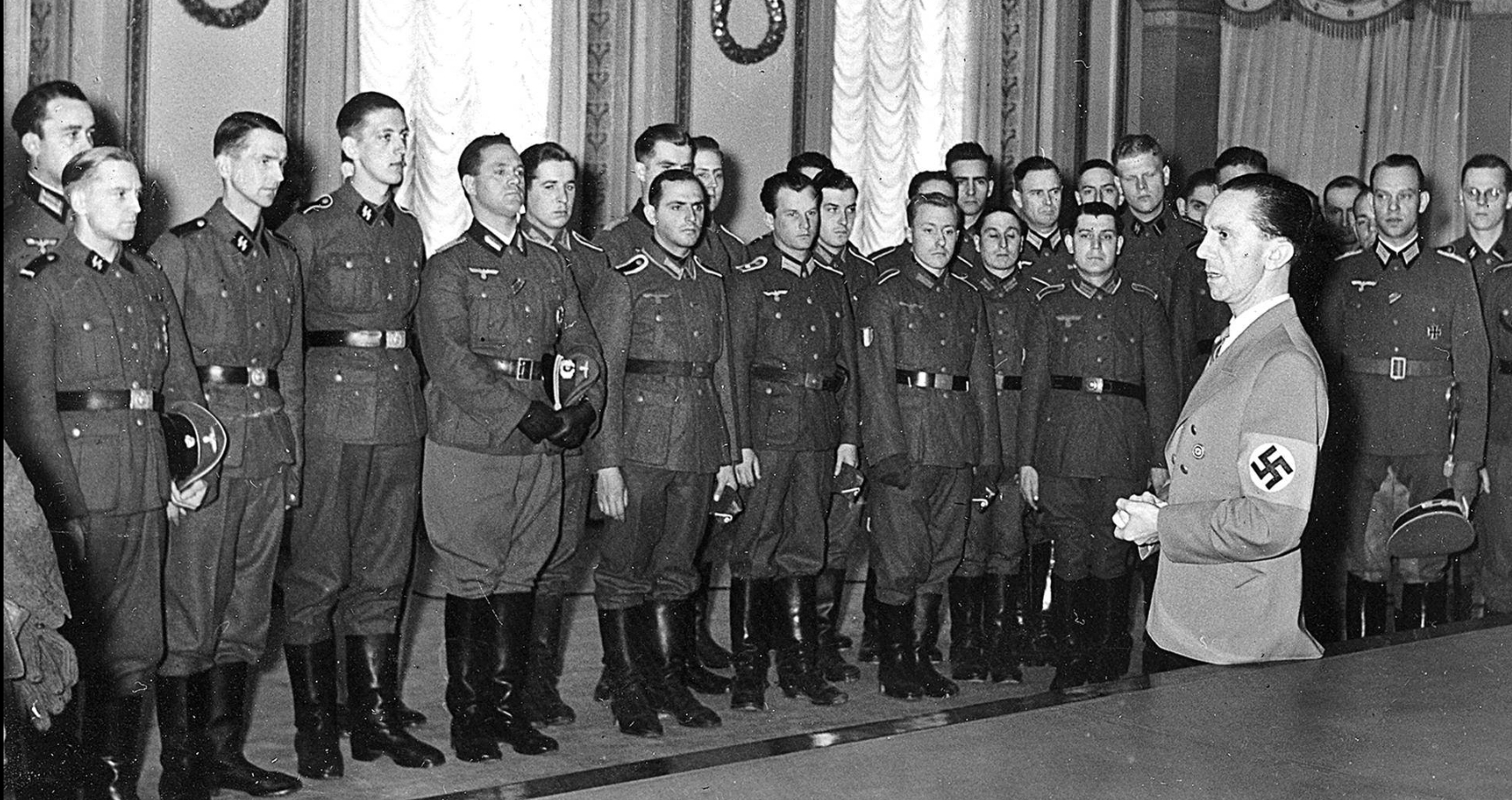
Finnish Waffen-SS volunteers meeting Joseph Goebbels in 1942

During the Continuation War (1941–1944) Finland's wartime government claimed to be a co-belligerent of Nazi Germany against the Soviet Union, and abstained from signing the Tripartite Pact. Finland was dependent on food, fuel, and armament shipments from Germany during this period, and was influenced to sign the Anti-Comintern Pact, a less formal alliance than the Tripartite Pact, seen by the Nazi leadership as a "litmus test of loyalty". The Finnish leadership adhered to many written and oral agreements on practical co-operation with Germany during the conflict. Finland was one of Germany's most important allies in the attack on the Soviet Union, allowing German troops to be based in Finland beforehand and join the attack almost immediately. The 1947 Paris Peace Treaty signed by Finland stated that Finland had been "an ally of Hitlerite Germany" and bore partial responsibility for the conflict.

Finland was an anomaly among German allies in that it retained an independent, democratic government. Moreover, during the war, Finland kept its army outside the German command structure despite numerous attempts by the Germans to tie it more tightly into it. Finland managed to play only a minor role in the siege of Leningrad despite Hitler's wishes, and refused to cut the Murmansk railway.

Finnish Jews were not persecuted, and even among extremists of the Finnish right, they were widely tolerated, as many leaders of the movement came from the clergy. Of approximately 500 Jewish refugees, eight were handed over to the Germans, a fact for which Finnish prime minister Paavo Lipponen issued an official apology in 2000. The field synagogue operated by the Finnish army was likely a unique phenomenon on the Eastern Front. Finnish Jews fought alongside other Finns.

About 2,600–2,800 Soviet prisoners of war were handed over to the Germans in exchange for roughly 2,200 Finnic prisoners of war held by the Germans. In November 2003, the Simon Wiesenthal Center submitted an official request to Finnish President Tarja Halonen for a full-scale investigation by the Finnish authorities of the prisoner exchange. The subsequent study by Professor Heikki Ylikangas revealed that about 2,000 of the exchanged prisoners joined the Russian Liberation Army. The rest, mostly army and political officers (among them a name-based estimate of 74 Jews), most likely perished in Nazi concentration camps.

=== Finland and World War II overall ===
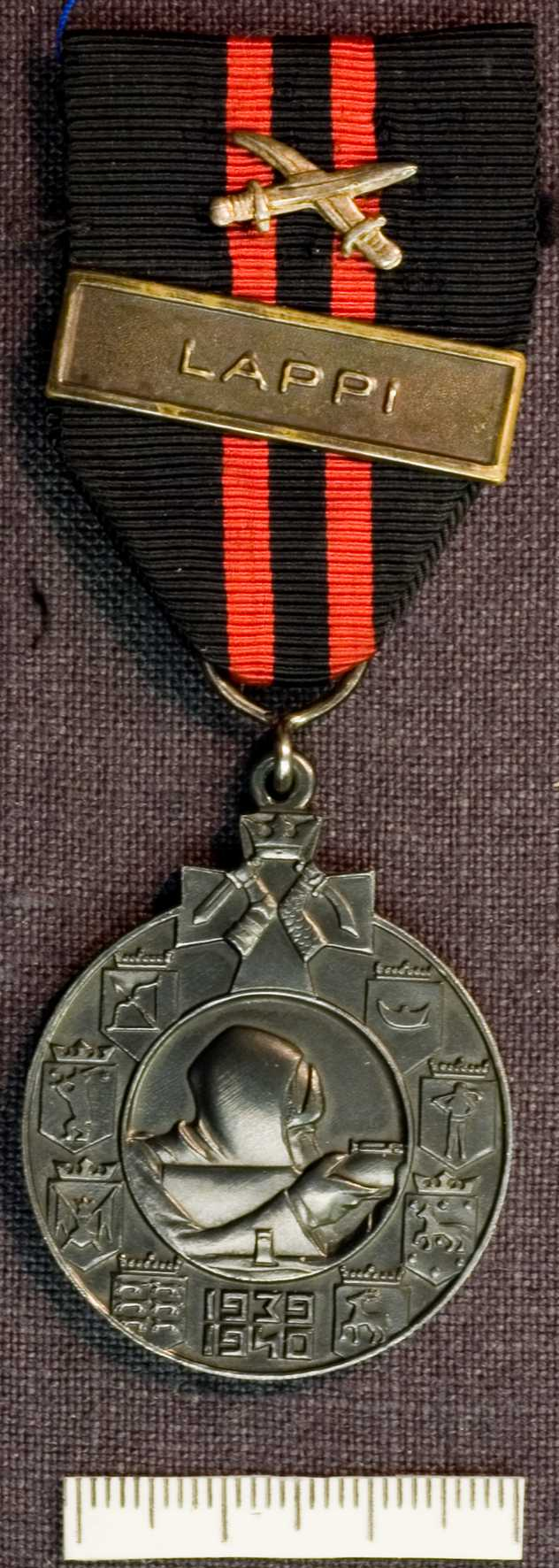
Medal of the Winter War

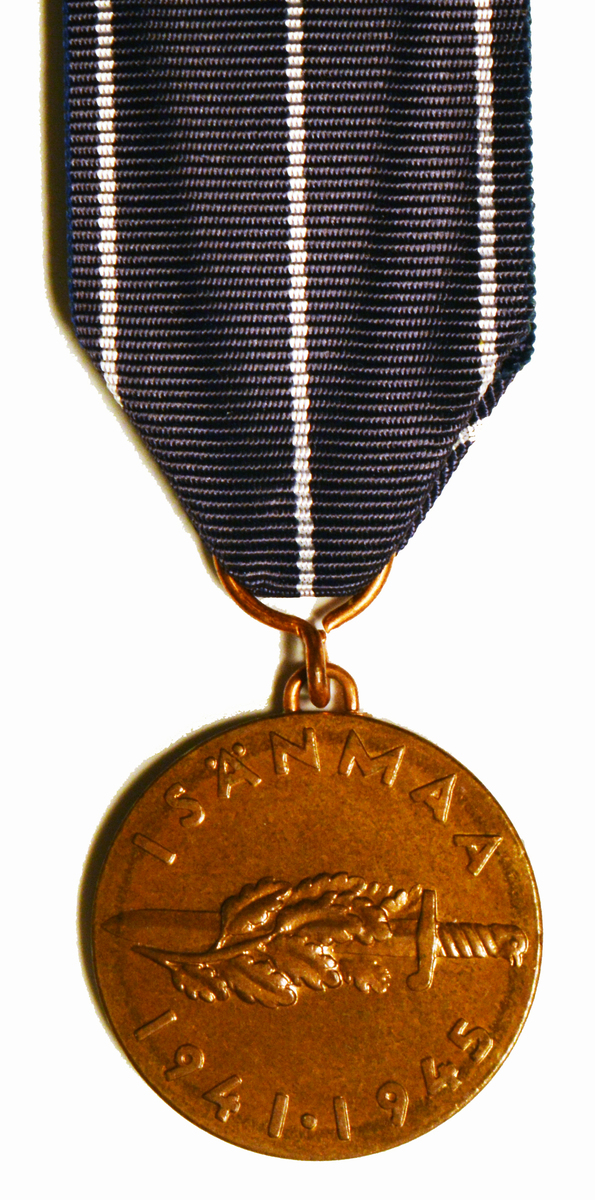
Medal of the Continuation War

Commemorative medals from both wars

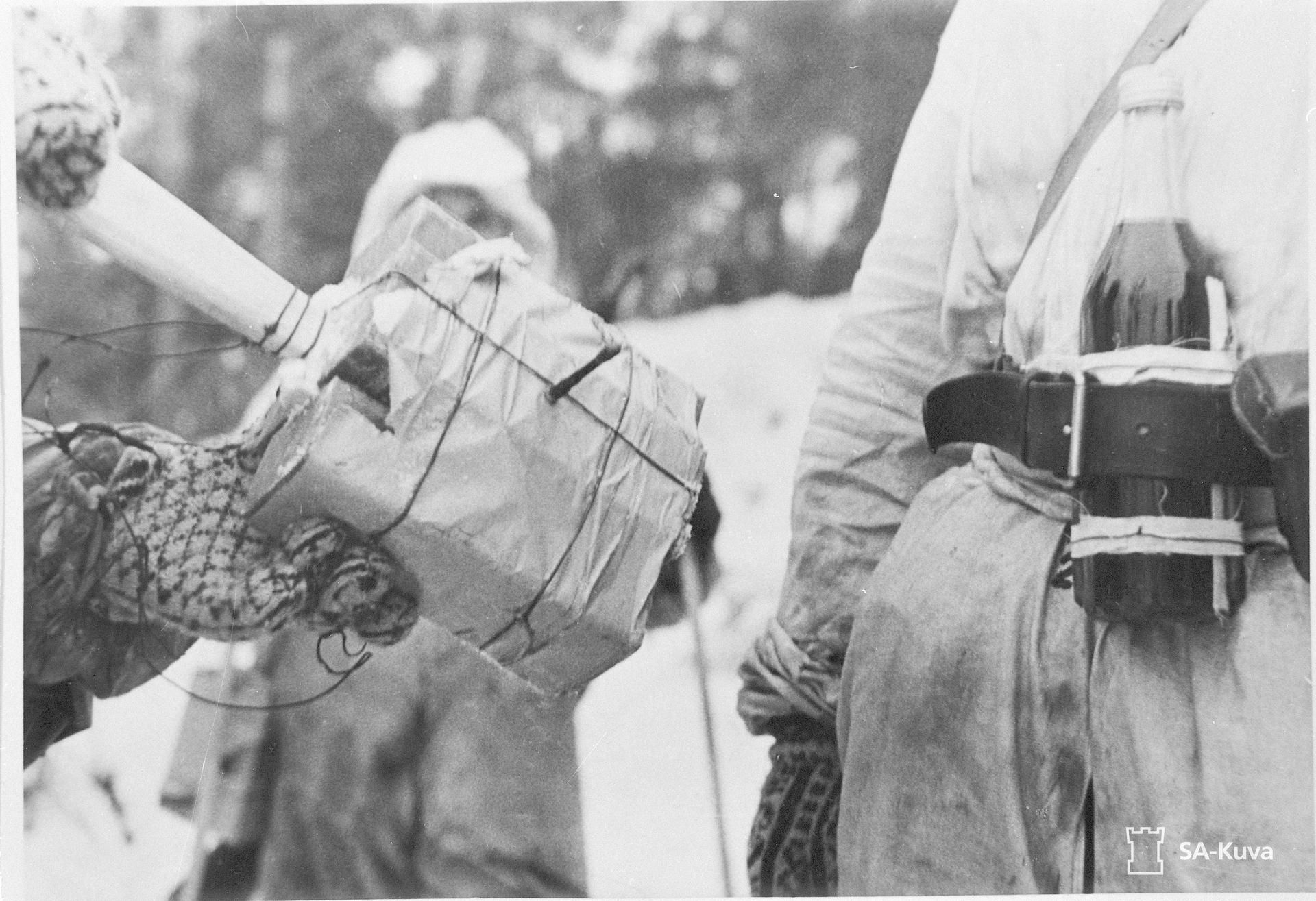
Finnish Satchel charge and Molotov cocktail

During World War II, Finland was anomalous: it was one of three European combatant countries whose capitals were not occupied (the other two being the Soviet Union and the United Kingdom). It was a country that sided with Germany, but in which native Jews and almost all refugees were safe from persecution. It was the only country that fought alongside Nazi Germany, which maintained democracy throughout the war. It was, in fact, the only democracy in mainland Europe that remained so despite being an involved party in the war.

According to the Finnish records, 19,085 Soviet prisoners of war died in Finnish prison camps during the Continuation War, which means that 29.6% of Soviet POWs taken by the Finns did not survive. The high number of fatalities was mainly due to malnutrition and diseases. However, about 1,000 POWs were shot, primarily when attempting to escape.

When the Finnish Army controlled East Karelia between 1941 and 1944, several concentration camps were set up for Russian civilians. The first camp was set up on 24 October 1941, in Petrozavodsk. Of these interned civilians, 4,361 perished mainly due to malnourishment, 90% of them during the spring and summer of 1942.

Finland never signed the Tripartite Pact but was aided by Germany in its military assault on the Soviet Union at the outset of Operation Barbarossa in 1941 and in its defence against Soviet attacks in 1944, prior to the separate peace with the Soviet Union in 1944. Finland was led by its elected president and parliament throughout 1939–1945. As a result, some political scientists cite it as one of the few instances in which a democratic country was engaged in war against one or more other democratic countries, namely, the democracies in the Allied forces. However, nearly all Finnish military engagements in World War II were fought solely against an autocratic power, the Soviet Union, and the lack of direct conflicts specifically with other democratic countries leads others to exclude Finnish involvement in World War II as an example of a war between two or more democracies.

Speaking in 2005, Finnish President Tarja Halonen said, "For us the world war meant a separate war against the Soviet Union and we did not incur any debt of gratitude to others". Finnish President Mauno Koivisto also expressed similar views in 1993. However, the view that Finland fought in a separate conflict during the Second World War remains controversial within Finland and has generally not been accepted outside Finland. In a 2008 poll of 28 Finnish historians carried out by Helsingin Sanomat, 16 said that Finland had been an ally of Nazi Germany, six said it had not been, and six did not take a position.

== See also ==
- Winter War
- Continuation War
- Lapland War
- Diplomatic history of World War II
- East Karelian concentration camps
- Nazism in Finland
- Mannerheim Cross
- Finnish Armed Forces
- History of Finland
- Seitajärvi, devastated by Soviet partisan attack in 1944
- Siege of Leningrad
- Soviet prisoners of war in Finland
