= Fraternization =

Establishment of personal relations

Fraternization (from Latin frater meaning "brother") is the act of establishing intimate relations between people or groups. It is generally used to refer to establishing relations that are considered unethical, controversial, problematic, or illegal. In many institutional contexts (such as militaries, diplomatic corps, parliaments, prisons, law enforcement or police, schools, sports teams, gangs and corporations) fraternization transgresses legal, moral, or professional norms forbidding certain categories of social contact across socially or legally defined classes.

The term often tends to connote impropriety, unprofessionalism or a lack of ethics. For example, "fraternization with the enemy" refers to associations with members of enemy groups and suggests a strong, deep, close, or romantic interest with an adversary which can be viewed as treason. "Fraternization with civilians" typically suggests transgression between members of the military or law enforcement with a civilian populace. "Fraternization of officers with enlisted personnel" or "seniors with their juniors" (the usual meaning in a military context) describes associations that are considered personal relations between higher rank personnel and lower personnel.

Many institutions worldwide implement policies forbidding forms of fraternization for many specific reasons. Fraternization may be forbidden to maintain image and morale, to protect and ensure fair and uniform treatment of subordinates, to maintain organizational integrity and the ability to achieve operational goals, and to prevent unauthorized transfers of information. Relations and activities forbidden under anti-fraternization policies may be romantic and sexual liaisons, gambling and ongoing business relationships, insubordination, or excessive familiarity and disrespect of rank. Views on fraternization are mixed and may depend on the relations and classes under discussion. Organizations may relax, change, or reinforce restrictions to reflect changes in the prevailing organizational view or doctrine regarding fraternization. Within an in-group fraternization may lead to friendship and self-actualization.

== Military ==
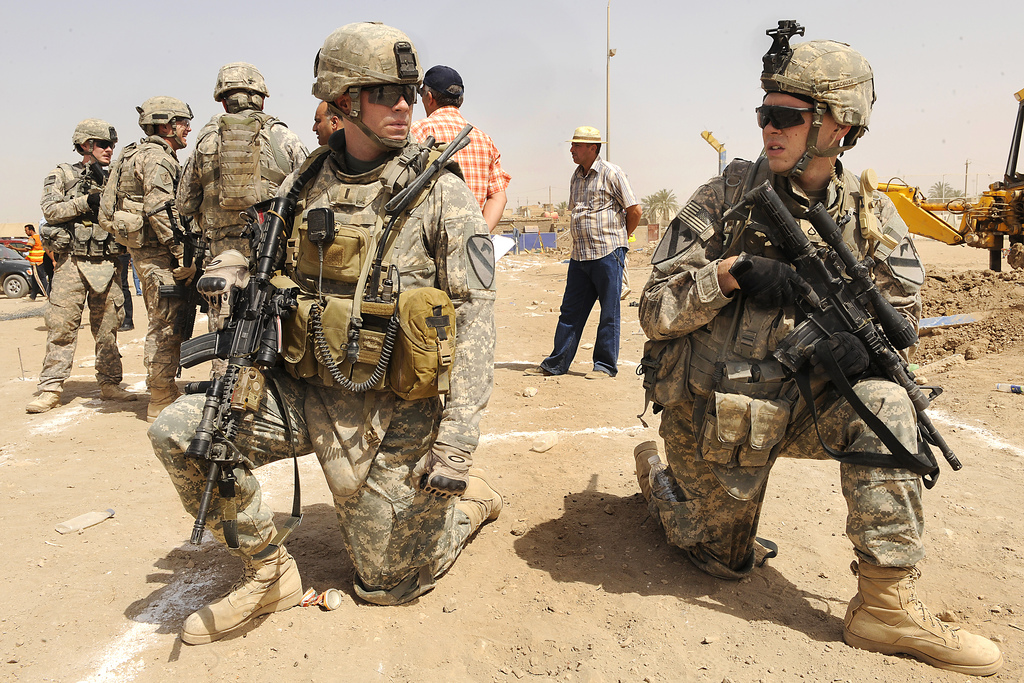
An officer (left) and an enlisted soldier of the US Army converse while they are on patrol in Iraq.

Within militaries, officers and members of enlisted ranks are typically prohibited from personally associating outside their professional duties and orders. Excessively familiar relationships between officers of different ranks may also be considered fraternization, especially between officers in the same chain of command. The reasons for anti-fraternization policies within modern militaries often include the maintenance of discipline and the chain of command and the prevention of the spreading of military secrets to enemies, which may amount to treason or sedition under military law. If a fighting force has officers unwilling to put certain enlisted personnel at risk or if enlisted soldiers believe that their selection for a perceived suicide mission is not motivated solely by a coldly impartial assessment of military strategy (to sacrifice some units so that the force as a whole will prevail), the enlisted soldiers may fail to provide the unhesitating obedience necessary to the realization of that strategy or may even attack their superiors.

The Christmas Truce was a notable instance of fraternization in World War I.

=== Allied occupation of Germany ===
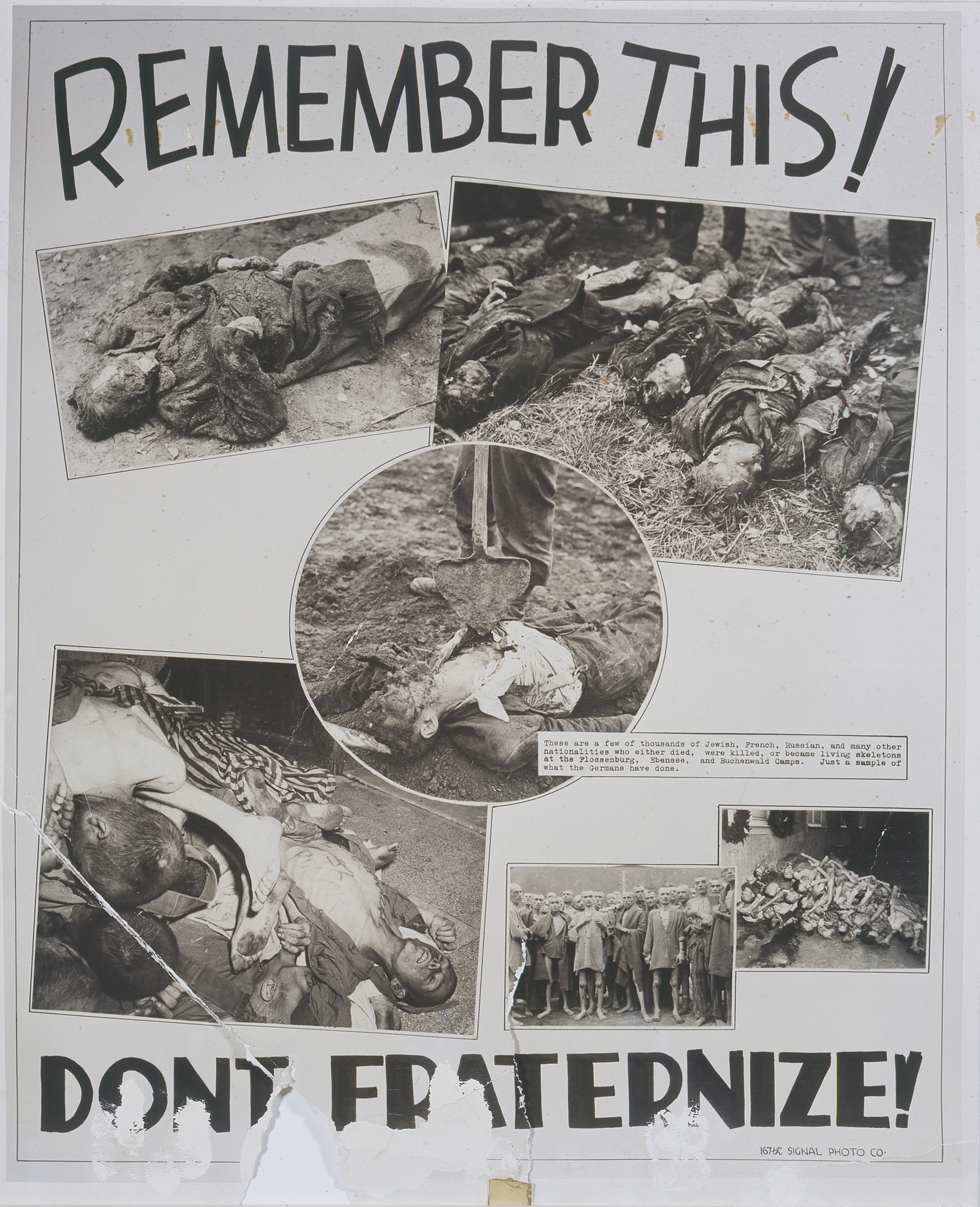
General Dwight Eisenhower ordered "No Fraternization" between US troops and the German people. Over a period of many months, the policy was loosened, first by permitting US GIs to talk to German children and then allowing them to talk to adults, both in certain circumstances.

When the Allied invasion of Germany began in autumn 1944, no standard rule on fraternization existed for American soldiers. JCS 1067 later implemented a strict non-fraternization policy with fines based on the fear of attacks by Werwolf fanatics willing to die for Nazi ideology, but soldiers instead found a defeated and desperate people. The policy was widely ignored after V-E Day. Annualized Venereal disease rates rose from 50 to 190 cases per 1000 soldiers in the first three months of the occupation, and to more than 250 by the end of 1945. The fraternization prohibition probably discouraged soldiers from obtaining prophylactics or requesting treatment.

In June 1945, the prohibition against speaking with German children was made less strict. In July, it became possible to speak to German adults in certain circumstances; happy soldiers called the rule change "the fraternization order", with enforcement of only the prohibitions on marriage and living in civilian homes continuing. Some units even sponsored fraternization, inviting girls of good character to social events. In September, the policy was abandoned in Austria and Germany. A November 1945 survey found that 56% of American soldiers had been "talking" with German girls during the previous seven days; 25% for ten hours or more.

In the earliest stages of the American zone of occupation, US soldiers were not allowed to pay maintenance for a child they admitted having fathered since to do so was considered as "aiding the enemy". Marriages between US soldiers and Austrian women were not permitted until January 1946 and with German women until December 1946.

A similar ban existed in the British zone of occupation. The War Office notably published that German women "will be willing, if they can get the chance, to make themselves cheap for what they can get out of you" in its handbook distributed to soldiers stationed in Germany. In spite of the ban, soldiers still knowingly had contact with local women, especially civilian employees. Field Marshal Bernard Montgomery, Eisenhower's counterpart, was against the ban, and it was lifted in July 1945. French and Soviet soldiers were never prohibited from fraternization.

== Education ==
Many schools and universities prohibit certain relationships between teachers/lecturers and students to avoid favoritism, coercion, sexual harassment, and/or sex crimes enabled by the teacher's position of authority. The prohibitions are controversial, however, as they may come into conflict with rules on tenure, for example, if unethical conduct is suspected but not confirmed.

== Workplace ==
Court decisions in some US states have allowed employers a limited legal right to enforce non-fraternization policies among employees, forbidding them to maintain certain kinds of relationships with one another. Since the 1990s, such corporate policies have been increasingly adopted in the United States in the pursuit of objectives such as protecting professionalism and workplace productivity, promoting gender equality and women's rights, or avoiding and mitigating the impact of sexual harassment lawsuits. The decisions and the policies they protect have, however, been criticized on various grounds: as illegitimate constraints on individual freedom of association, as tools for companies to punish participation in labor unions, and as expressions of overzealous political correctness.

Professional and college-level sports teams in the US have enacted anti-fraternization policies between athletes and cheerleaders. Very few American football teams allow casual contacts between players and cheerleaders. Reasons include interference with concentration, potential fallout for the images of teams, the possibility of sex crimes or sexual harassment, and attendant legal liability.

== See also ==
- Blood brother
- Interpersonal relationship
- Friendship
- Christmas truce
- Socialization
- MeToo movement
