= Finnish prisoners of war in the Soviet Union =

There were two waves of the Finnish prisoners of war in the Soviet Union during World War II: POWs during the Winter War and the Continuation War.

== Winter War ==
Before the Winter War (1939–1940), the Soviet Union established the main camp for Finnish POWs within the former monastery near Gryazovets in Vologda Oblast, Russia. The NKVD expected the war to result in many POWs and planned nine camps to handle about 25,000 men. However, over the whole of the Winter War there were only about 900 Finnish POWs, about 600 of who were placed in the Gryazovets camp. A total of 838 Finnish POWs were returned to Finland. The last party of Finns left Russia on April 20, 1940.

== Continuation War ==
The number of Finnish prisoners of war during the Continuation War (1941–1944) is estimated from 2,377 to 3,500 persons.

=== Soviet and Russian views ===
According to the official Soviet statistics, Finland lost 2,377 men as prisoners of war, and their mortality rate was 17 percent.

According to Russian historian Viktor Konasov, 2,476 Finns were registered by the NKVD (People's Commissariat for Internal Affairs), of which 1,972 were handled by POW camps with the majority handled by Camp no. 158 in Cherepovets, Vologda Oblast, and its subcamps. Of all captured, 582 were from the Finnish offensive in 1941, 506 during 1942–1943 and 2,313 during the Soviet offensive of 1944.

=== Finnish historians ===
Finnish historians estimate the number of prisoners was around 3,500 persons, of whom five were women. The number of deceased is estimated around 1,500 persons. Approximately 2,000 persons returned home. It is estimated that the mortality rate was even 40 percent. The result is different from the Soviet statistics, where officials mainly checked only prisoners who survived to reach a prison camp. Finnish studies have tracked individuals and their fates. Most common causes of death were hunger, cold and oppressive transportation.

In the beginning of capture, executions of Finnish prisoners of war were mainly done by the Soviet partisans. The partisans operated deep inside Finnish territory and they mainly executed their soldier and civilian POWs after a minor interrogation. Usually Finnish officer POWs had a chance to survive until arriving for a major interrogation at the headquarters of Soviet Karelian partisans or the Karelian Front, or quarters of the NKVD. After this, a Finnish POW had a much better chance to stay alive until the end of the war.

The high mortality rate of prisoners of war had objective issues, such as huge territory losses in the beginning of the war and high number of POWs. There were shortages of food and medicine, and POWs had to work exhausting duties in labor camps. Furthermore, medical treatment was of a very low standard. However, overall the treatment of Finnish POWs was humane being war time.

== Aftermath ==
In 1992 a memorial monument was established at Cherepovets cemetery, where Finnish POWs were buried.

== See also ==
- Prisoners of war in World War II
- Soviet prisoners of war in Finland
