= East Karelian concentration camps =

Camps operated by Finland in the Soviet Union

East Karelian concentration camps were a set of concentration camps operated by the Finnish military administration in the areas of the Soviet Union occupied by Finland during the Continuation War. The camps were intended to hold local Russian detainees for future exchange with the Finnic population from the rest of Russia. The mortality rate of civilians in the camps was high due to famine and disease.

== Overview ==
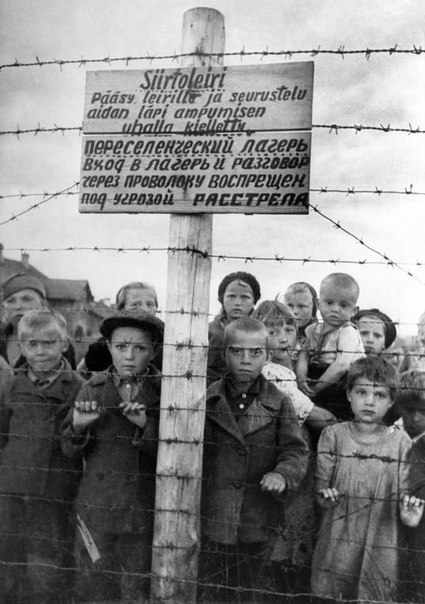
Soviet children in a concentration camp with a sign that reads: “Entrance to the camp and conversation with the children prohibited under threat of being machine-gunned”.

Significant numbers of Soviet civilians were interned in the camps. These were primarily Russian children and elderly, as almost all of the working age male and female population were either drafted or evacuated. Only a third of the original population of 470,000 remained in East Karelia when the Finnish army arrived, and half of them were Karelians. About 30 percent (24,000) of the remaining Russian population were confined in camps; 6,000 of them were Soviet refugees captured while they awaited transportation over Lake Onega, and 3,000 were from the southern side of the River Svir. While camps in Karelia are not comparable to Nazi concentration camps or Soviet Gulags, according the Finnish historian Oula Silvennoinen the camps were "a tool for preparing what would nowadays be called ethnic cleansing".

The first of the camps were set up on 24 October 1941 in Petrozavodsk. During the spring and summer of 1942, about 3,500 detainees died of malnutrition. During the second half of 1942, the number of detainees dropped quickly to 15,000 as people were released to their homes or were resettled to the "safe" villages, and only 500 more people died during the last two years of war, as the food shortages were alleviated. During the following years, the Finnish authorities detained several thousand more civilians from areas with reported partisan activity, but as the releases continued the total number of detainees remained at 13,000–14,000. According to the records the total number of deaths among the interned civilians and POWs was 4,361 (earlier estimates varied between 4,000 and 7,000), mostly from hunger during the spring and summer of 1942.

== Petrozavodsk camps ==
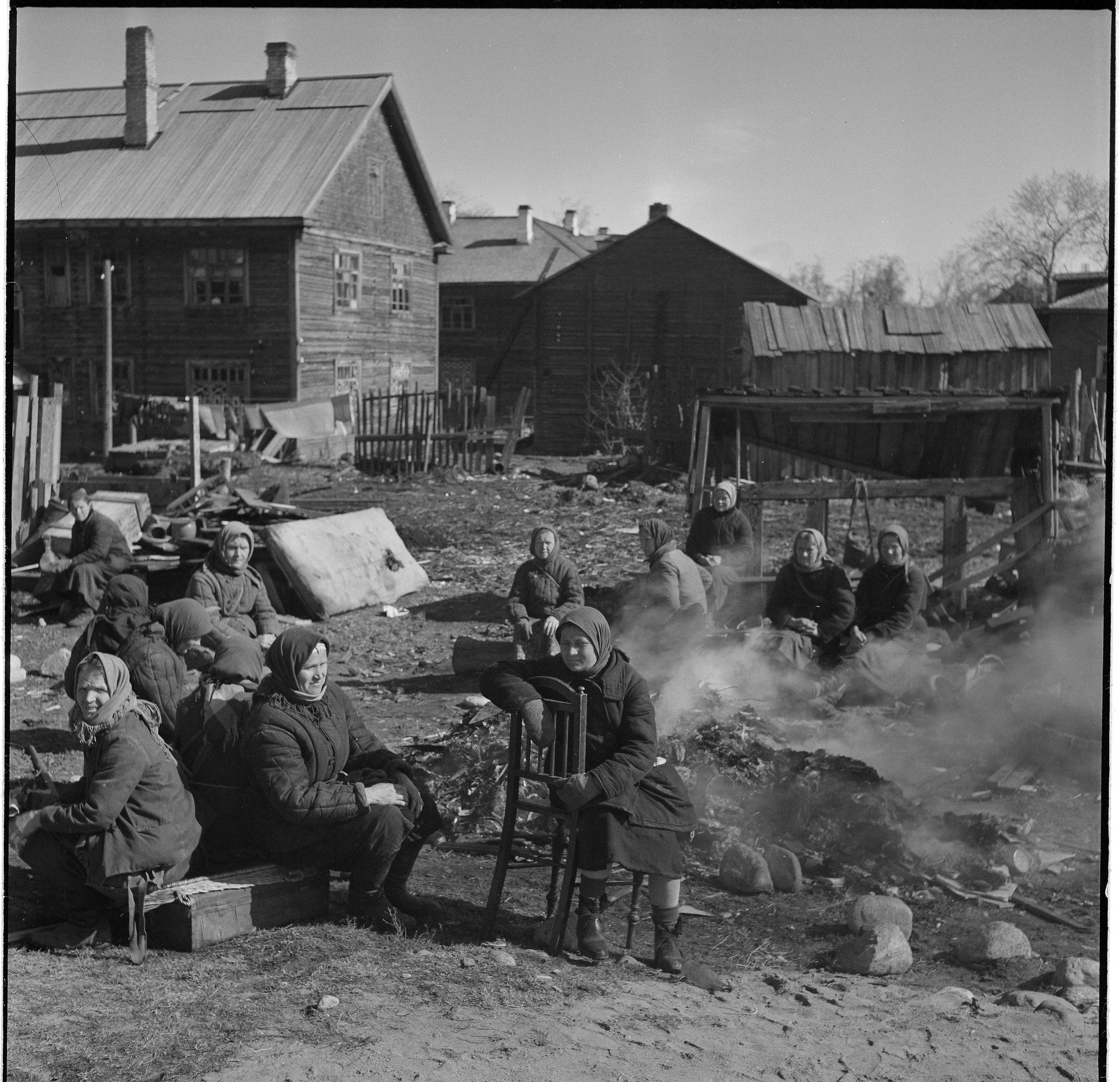
Soviet women having breakfast next to a burning pile of trash at a Finnish concentration camp in Petrozavodsk, Karelia, during the Continuation War on 24 April 1942

Äänislinna, the Finnish name for Petrozavodsk, was the site of six major concentration camps (Finnish: keskitysleiri) and one major labor camp (työleiri) during the Finnish occupation of East Karelia. Additional camps in occupied Karelian territory and Finland were located in Ilyinsky, Kolvasozero, Miehikkälä, and Pyhäniemi.

According to volume three of the Encyclopedia of Camps and Ghettos, 1933-1945, inmates housed within the confines of the Äänislinna camps lived in relatively decent conditions. Likewise, rations in the Karelia camps, although meager, were enough for Soviet citizens to survive on. Roughly 18.1 percent (or 4,279) Soviet citizens died within the Karelia concentration camps between 1941 and 1944. The death rate in Karelian camps were higher in comparison to camps such as the camp in Miehikkälä inside Finland where about 7 percent (or 138 people) perished out of a population of 2,000. This was likely due to the consumption of poor drinking water which caused illness rates to skyrocket in the summer of 1942.

== 2020 investigation ==
In February 2020 the Russian Federation's Federal Security Service released an op-ed probe on the use of Finnish concentration camps claiming the use of gas chambers, firing squads, and the deaths of more prisoners than Finland and other media historians have previously reported. The investigation committee, headed by Alexander Bastrykin, claims that Finland committed genocide in Karelia during the course of the war. The director of the National Archives of Finland, Jussi Nuorteva, found the Russian claims absurd stating "The Finns did not engage in large-scale population transfers or large-scale killings". According to EUvsDisinfo both the Prime Minister's Office and the Academy of Finland have performed a multitude of studies on the subject including deaths and mortality rates, population transfers, and the participation of Finnish volunteers in the Waffen-SS. Researchers on the subject such as Finnish academic Antti Laine state that the claims made by Russia are another way to "boost President Vladimir Putin's regime".

== See also ==
- Soviet prisoners of war in Finland

== Bibliography ==
- Westerlund, Lars, ed. (2008). Sotavangit ja internoidut : Kansallisarkiston artikkelikirja [Prisoners of war and internees : a book of articles by the National Archives] (PDF) (in English, Finnish, and Norwegian). Helsinki: Kansallisarkisto. p. 568. ISBN 978-951-53-3139-7. Archived from the original (PDF) on August 15, 2014.
- Westerlund, Lars, ed. (2008). POW deaths and people handed over to Germany and the Soviet Union in 1939-55: a research report by the Finnish National Archives. Helsinki: Kansallisarkisto. ISBN 978-951-53-3140-3.
- Westerlund, Lars, ed. (2008). Talvi-, jatko- ja Lapin sodan sotavanki- ja siviilileirit 1939-1944: käsikirja [The Finnish POW and internee camp handbook 1939-1944] (PDF). Helsinki: Kansallisarkisto. ISBN 978-951-53-3149-6. WorldCat.
