= Holnicote Estate =

Country estate in Somerset, England

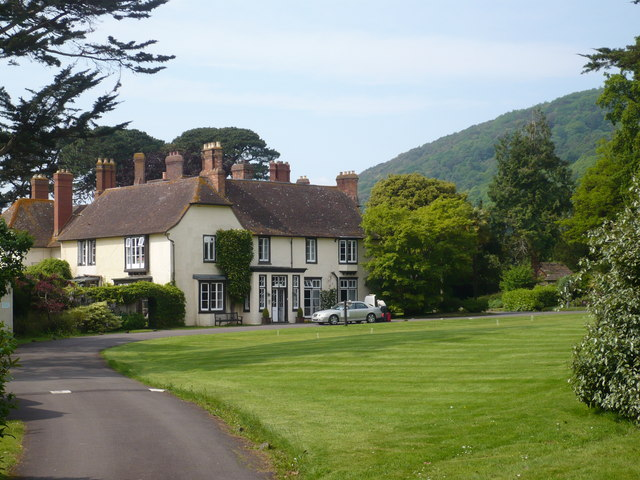
- Holnicote House

- Location within Somerset
- 51°12′21″N 3°33′43″W
- Location: Exmoor, England

Holnicote /ˈhʌnɪˌkʌt/ (pronounced "Hunnicutt") in the parish of Selworthy, West Somerset, England, is a historic estate consisting of 12,420 acres (5,026 hectares) of land, much situated within the Exmoor National Park.

There have been several houses on the estate over the last 500 years. In 1705 a new mansion was built which was burned down in 1779. It was rebuilt as a hunting lodge and survived until another fire in 1851 and replaced ten years later. It became one of the centres for the Devon and Somerset Staghounds. The main building was damaged by another fire in 1941. The house and surrounding estate were given to the National Trust in 1944 by Sir Richard Thomas Dyke Acland, 15th Baronet. The house is now operated as an hotel. The surrounding land which includes Dunkery and Selworthy Beacons, and the villages and hamlets of Selworthy, Allerford, Bossington, Horner and Luccombe as well as the Dunkery and Horner Woods National Nature Reserve contains more than 240 kilometres (150 mi) of footpaths and bridleways.

In the 13th and 14th centuries the estate was held by the de Holne family. During the 17th century the Staynings were lords of the manor and in the 18th descendants of FitzMartin by then known as the Martyn family had taken over. William Martin sold Holnicote to William Blackford and it descended through his family and then passed to the Dyke family. Sir Thomas Acland married into the family and added the surname to become Sir Thomas Dyke Acland, 7th Baronet and it remained in his family until the donation in 1944.

== History ==
=== Early ===
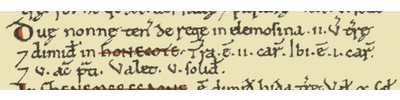
The Domesday Book entry for Honecote, showing the manor held by two nuns

Alternative derivations of the name Holnicote, which was spelled variously as Honecote, Hunecote or Hunecota, have been suggested. It may relate to holegn, the Anglo-Saxon word for holly. Eilert Ekwall supports the claim that places which start Holne come from the Old English holegn meaning holly, while Stephen Robinson, in his book on local place names prefers an explanation "The Honey Cottage" from the Old English honeg and cot. In the 19th century, the Rector of Selworthy, the Rev. F. Hancock, who was said to have extensively studied the place-names of his parish, preferred the old English personal name Hùn for the first element.

There are several references in the Domesday Book to Honecote, Hunnecota or Hunecota in the hundred of Carhampton. One records land held by one William of the tenant-in-chief, Roger de Corcelle; prior to the Norman Conquest, this land belonged to two theigns called Aluric and Bristeuin. Odo, son of Gamelin, held a detached portion of this land. The second record shows two nuns holding two and half virgates. (Note: Chadwyck-Healey provides a translation of the Domesday materials and in his index, he identifies the passages as referring to Holnicote. The extracts are from pages 179 (referring to the nuns), 403 (referring to de Corcelle) and 475 (referring to Odo) of the Exon Domesday Book, and folios 91d (referring to the nuns) and 94 (referring to de Corcelle) from the Great Domesday Book.) The local historian and lawyer Charles Chadwyck-Healey identifies these manors with modern Holnicote, the National Archives agrees with him in their catalogue, (Note: The catalogue entries for the Great Domesday Book are at "Place name: Holnicote, Somerset". National Archives. and "Place name: Holnicote Somerset". National Archives. They refer to folios 94 recto and 91 verso respectively, which equate to the entries for de Corcelle and the nuns (cf. Chadwyck-Healey 1901, p. 6).) and the Open Domesday project lists them under Holnicote, but the editors of the Victoria County History series only identify the land held by the nuns with Holnicote and state that de Corcelle's manor was actually Huntscott in Wootton Courtney.

There is scarce evidence regarding the holders of Holnicote in the period immediately after Domesday. William de Holne held the manor in the reign of Edward I. Although Chadwyck-Healey described it is "very probable" that this William de Holne is the same man recorded elsewhere with a son, Richard, whose daughter Thomasia married John, son of Walter Gofreye, the evidence is not conclusive. By the late 15th century, the Steynings family were claiming descent from the Huish and de Holne dynasties. Their origins are obscure and the earliest record of them is the will of William Steynings, which was proved in 1491. His son, Edward, died in 1524/5 and was succeeded by his son Walter; Edward Steynings's will refers to property at Holnicote. Eventually, his grandson Thomas became owner of the manor and house of Holnicote; he is listed in Crown account books as early as 1558. His younger brother, Philip (died 1588/9), succeeded him at Holnicote.

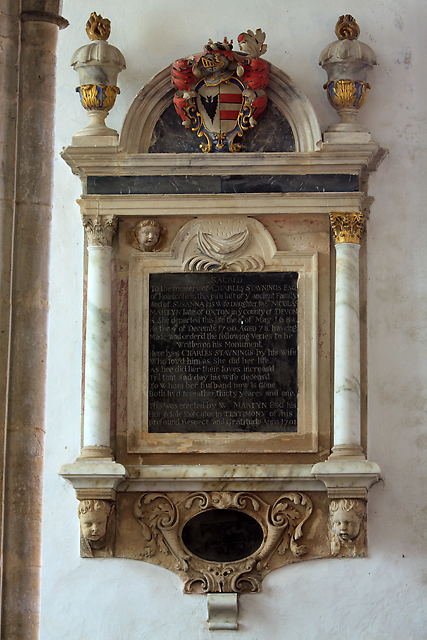
Memorial tablet to Charles Staynings (died 1700) in Church of All Saints, Selworthy

=== Martyn and Blackford families ===
The Steynings family owned Holnicote until the direct male line became extinct with the death of Charles Staynings (1622–1700). His wife, Susanna (died 1685), was a daughter of Sir Nicholas Martyn of Oxton and Steynings's heir was their nephew, William Martyn. According to records of the Heralds' Visitations of Devon and research by the Victorian historian John Lambrick Vivian, this William Martyn lived in Oxton in the parish of Kenton, Devon; he was Susanna Martyn's great-nephew and died in 1710, aged 30. He sold the estate to William Blackford, a Master in Chancery. Blackford then bought the manors of Bossington and Avill, the latter from Anthony Stocker and his wife, Sarah; this estate extended from the ridge of Grabbist nearly to the sea-shore and also included land in the parishes of Dunster, Carhampton, Crowcombe, Stogumber, Timberscombe and St. Decumans. He married Elizabeth, a daughter of John Dyke of Pixton, and died in 1728. His son, William, succeeded him and married Henrietta Collet (died 1727), a daughter and co-heiress of Joseph Collet of Hertford Castle in Hertfordshire. However, he died only three years after his father. Their only daughter and heiress, Henrietta Blackford, inherited the estate as an infant, but died aged 7 in 1733. The estates were divisible upon a great-aunt, Elizabeth Dyke (died 1737), and a second cousin, Elizabeth, a daughter of Thomas Dyke of Tetton and Mary, a daughter of Elizabeth Dyke (died 1737). Later in 1733, Elizabeth Dyke (died 1737) conveyed her share in the estate to her only surviving son, Edward Dyke (died 1746) who in turn conveyed his portion to his niece in 1744, making her the sole owner of the entire estate.

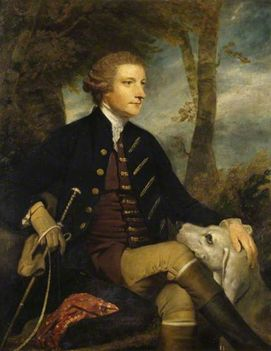
Sir Thomas Dyke Acland, 7th Baronet (1723–1785). Portrait, 1767, by Sir Joshua Reynolds, on display at Killerton House. A similar painting, which is also owned by the National Trust can be seen at Saltram House.

=== Acland family ===
Elizabeth Dyke married Sir Thomas Dyke Acland, 7th Baronet (1722–1785) of Killerton in Devon and Petherton Park in Somerset in 1745. A prominent member of the West Country gentry, Acland was a famous staghunter who used his wife's Exmoor estates of Holnicote and Pixton as his hunting seats. He built kennels for the North Devon Staghounds and kept his own pack of dogs. He became forester or ranger of Exmoor under grant from the Crown, a title for the king's chief officer of the royal forest. According to the Victorian author, Charles Palk Collyns, he "hunted the country in almost princely style. Respected and beloved by all the countryside, he was solicited at the same time to allow himself to be returned as member of Parliament for the counties of Devon and Somerset. He preferred, however, the duties and pleasures of life in the country, where he bore without abuse the grand old name of gentleman". Although he had three of his own kennels, he had a further method of keeping hounds at Holnicote, Jury and Highercombe, whereby he made the keeping of one hound a term a stipulation of many of the tenancies he granted. In his manor of Bossington (near Holnicote) alone an estate survey of 1746–1747 lists twelve tenements let, either by Acland or Dyke, with the requirement to keep a hound.

In 1775 he handed over the mastership to the then Major Basset, and in 1779 his beloved collection of stag heads and antlers at Holnicote was lost in a fire which also destroyed the house. He declared that "he minded the destruction of his valuables less bitterly than the loss of his fine collection of stags' heads". He was known on his estates as "Sir Thomas his Honour" (as later was his son the 9th Baronet) and was renowned for his generous hospitality at Holnicote or at Pixton, whichever was closest, to all riders "in at the death", and it is said that by the architect Anne Acland that "open house was kept at Pixton and Holnicote throughout the hunting season".

Acland's eldest son died as a result of wounds aged 34. His grandson died at the age of 7 a few weeks after inheriting the baronetcy and so his second son, Thomas Dyke Acland (1752–1794), became the ninth Baronet. Like his father, he was known locally in Devon and Somerset as "Sir Thomas his Honour" and they shared a passion for stag hunting. He followed him into the Mastership of the North Devon Staghounds and virtually abandoned the family's main seat of Killerton in mid-Devon to live at Holnicote and Highercombe, near Dulverton, on the north and south edges respectively of the ancient royal forest of Exmoor, renown for its herds of red deer. During the period 1785 to his death in 1794 he killed 101 stags, the heads and antlers of many of which are still displayed in the stables at Holnicote. He was a stern employer of his hunt-staff, and on one occasion when his hounds had killed several sheep, possibly belonging to his farming tenants, he ordered his huntsman "to hang himself and the whole pack".

The estate passed down through the Acland family until February 1944, when Sir Richard Dyke Acland, 15th Baronet (1906–1990) donated the Holnicote and Killerton Estates to the National Trust, comprising 16,000 acres (6,500 ha), which was the largest ever donation received by the National Trust.

== Estate ==
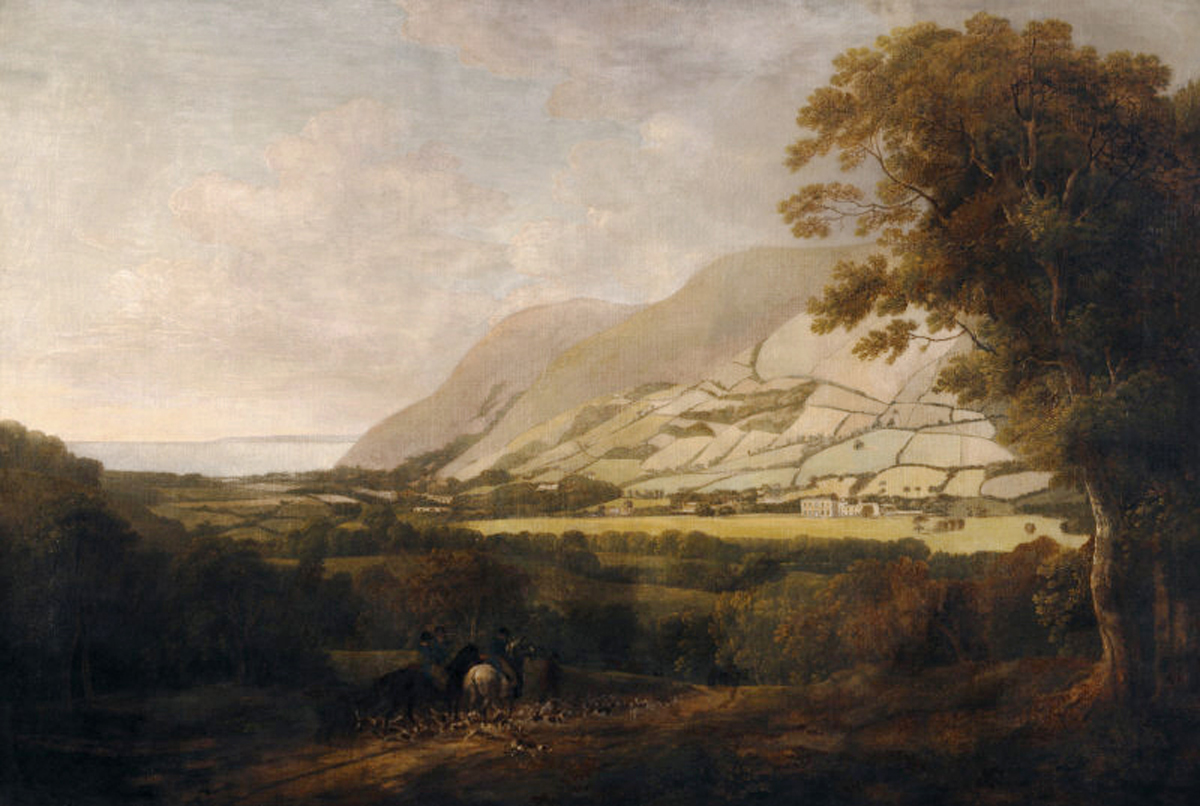
Holnicote House in 1785, as rebuilt after the fire of 1779, viewed from the south-west. In the foreground is Sir Thomas Dyke Acland, 9th Baronet, with staghounds. Oil painting, 1785, by Francis Towne, in the National Trust collection at Killerton House.

The estate had a role, together with the Acland family's other Exmoor estate of Pixton, as a home of West Country staghunting in the 18th century. There was some controversy locally and nationally when the National Trust banned stag hunting on the estate in the early 21st century.

Holnicote Estate covers more than 12,000 acres (4,900 ha) and contains more than 240 kilometres (150 mi) of footpaths and bridleways. It includes Dunkery and Selworthy Beacons, and the villages and hamlets of Selworthy, Allerford, Bossington, Horner and Luccombe as well as the Dunkery and Horner Woods National Nature Reserve. The estate also plays host to a point to point course on which many Exmoor hunts hold their meetings throughout the spring.

Dunkery Beacon is the summit of Dunkery Hill, and the highest point on Exmoor and in Somerset. The sandstone hill rises to 1,705 feet (520 m) and provides views over the surrounding moorland, the Bristol Channel and hills up to 86 miles (138 km) away. The site has been visited by humans since the Bronze Age with several burial mounds in the form of cairns and bowl barrows. Sweetworthy on the lower slopes is the site of two Iron Age hill forts or enclosures and a deserted medieval settlement. At the top of Selworthy Beacon is a National Trust plaque and a view of the south coast of Wales across the Bristol Channel. The South West Coast Path also climbs the hill and ends slightly shy of the summit. Its elevation is 1,013 feet (309 m). Behind the hill, there are precipitous cliffs. Near the summit are a series of cairns, thought to be the remains of round barrows, and the Iron Age Bury Castle. The round cairns have been scheduled as an ancient monument. In the 16th century, Selworthy Beacon was the site of a beacon to warn of impending invasions. The mausoleum of Sir Thomas Dyke Acland, 10th Baronet is about 0.25 miles (400 m) from Selworthy Beacon. The hills have a deep purple colour during the summer due to the covering of heather. Ling and bell heather, gorse, sessile oak, ash, rowan, hazel, bracken, mosses, liverworts, lichens and ferns all grow here or in surrounding woodland, as well as some unique whitebeam species. Exmoor ponies, red deer, pied flycatchers, wood warblers, lesser spotted woodpeckers, redstarts, dippers, snipe, skylarks and kestrels are some of the fauna to be found here and in nearby Horner Woods. Horner Woods are also the home to 14 of the 16 UK bat species, which include barbastelle and Bechstein's bats.

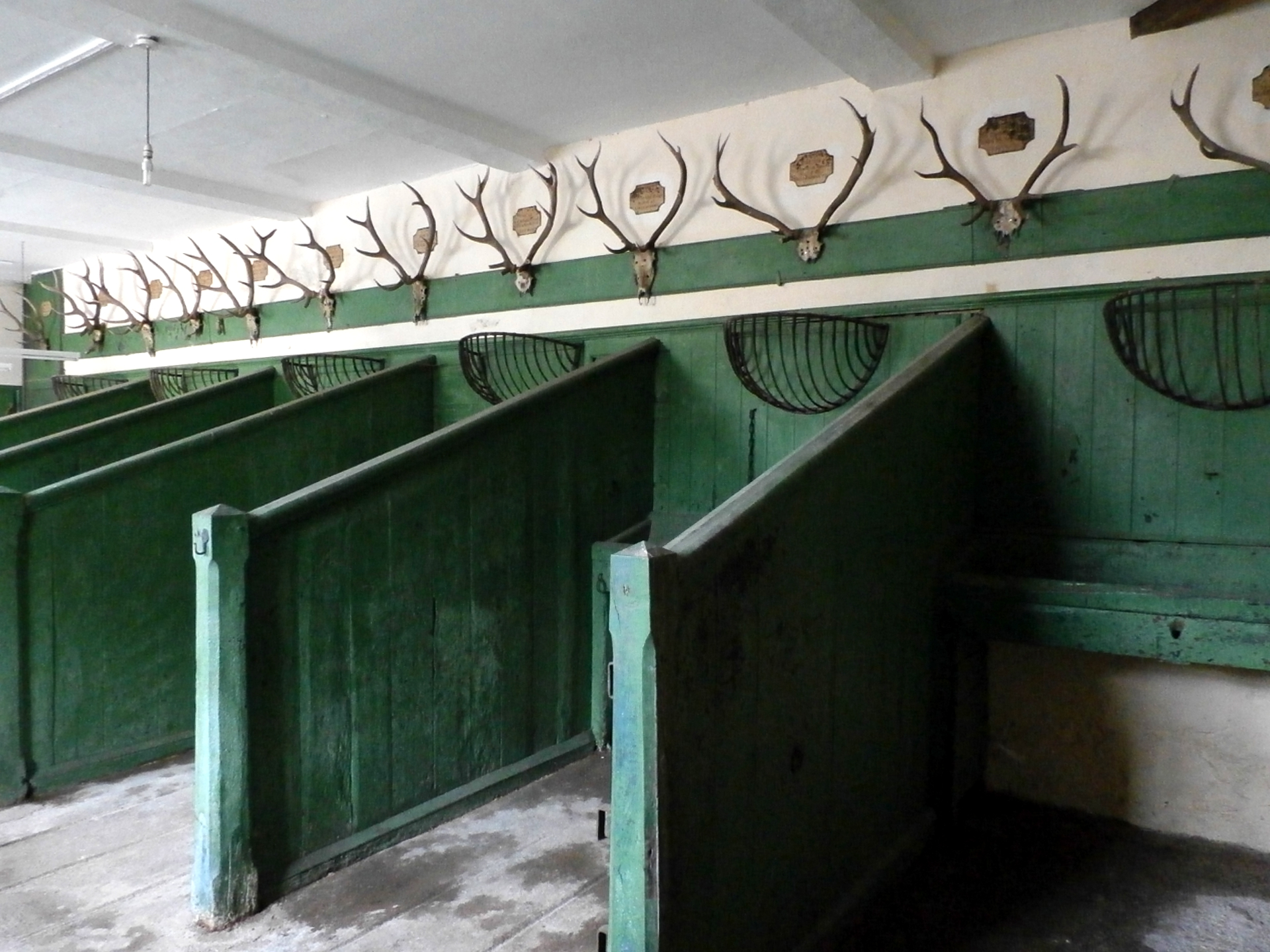
Stalls in stable block built by Sir Thomas Dyke Acland, 9th Baronet (1752–1794) at Holnicote. The 30 stag heads on the walls date from about 1787 to 1793 and were killed under his mastership of the Devon and Somerset Staghounds.

Selworthy is a small village and civil parish which includes the hamlets of Bossington, Tivington, Lynch, Brandish Street and Allerford. Bossington is separated from Porlock Bay by a shingle beach, through which flows the River Horner, forming part of the Porlock Ridge and Saltmarsh Site of Special Scientific Interest. In the 1990s rising sea levels created salt marshes, and lagoons developed in the area behind the boulder bank. The village is on the South West Coast Path. Selworthy was rebuilt as a model village, to provide housing for the aged and infirm of the Holnicote estate, in 1828 by Sir Thomas Acland. Many of the other cottages, some of which are now rented out, are still thatched and are listed buildings, whose walls are painted with limewash that has been tinted creamy yellow with ochre. On the hill above the village is the whitewashed 15th-century Church of All Saints, with a 14th-century tower. One of Allerford's main attractions is the much-photographed packhorse bridge. Built as a crossing over the River Aller (from which the village gets its name), it is thought to be medieval in origin. The village is also home to Allerford House, childhood home of Admiral John Moresby, who explored the coastline of New Guinea and for whom Port Moresby, the capital city of Papua New Guinea, was named. Other features of the village include thatched cottages, a forge and an old-fashioned red telephone box. There is also a Reading Room, built by the Acland family to foster adult education. One of the thatched cottages operated as the local Primary School between 1821 and 1981 and is now a museum containing the West Somerset Rural Life Museum and Victorian School. The museum houses the West Somerset Photographic Archive.

The village of Luccombe lies at the foot of Dunkery Hill. Along with Stoke Pero and Horner it forms a civil parish. Horner is on the eastern bank of Horner Water on which there is a restored, but non-working, watermill. The river is crossed by two medieval packhorse bridges, one of which is known as Hacketty Way Bridge which is crossed by the Coleridge Way. The parish Church of St Mary has a chancel dating from about 1300, with the nave and tower being added around 1450. Stoke Pero Church has a 13th-century tower. The Dovecot at Blackford Farm is part of the estate. It was built in the 11th century and is a Grade II* listed building, and ancient monument. It was attached to a mansion house which burnt down in 1875.

Since 2009 the estate has been one of three Multi-Objective Flood Management Demonstration Schemes, funded by the Department for Environment, Food and Rural Affairs, to examine how changes in the management of river catchment areas can influence the incidence and severity of flooding in the area. Beavers were re-introduced to assist flood reduction.

== House and outbuildings ==
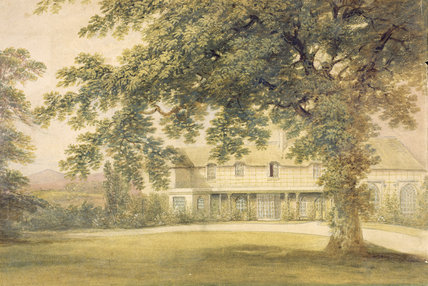
Holnicote House, the cottage orné hunting lodge built in about 1800 and burned down in 1851, predecessor of the present building

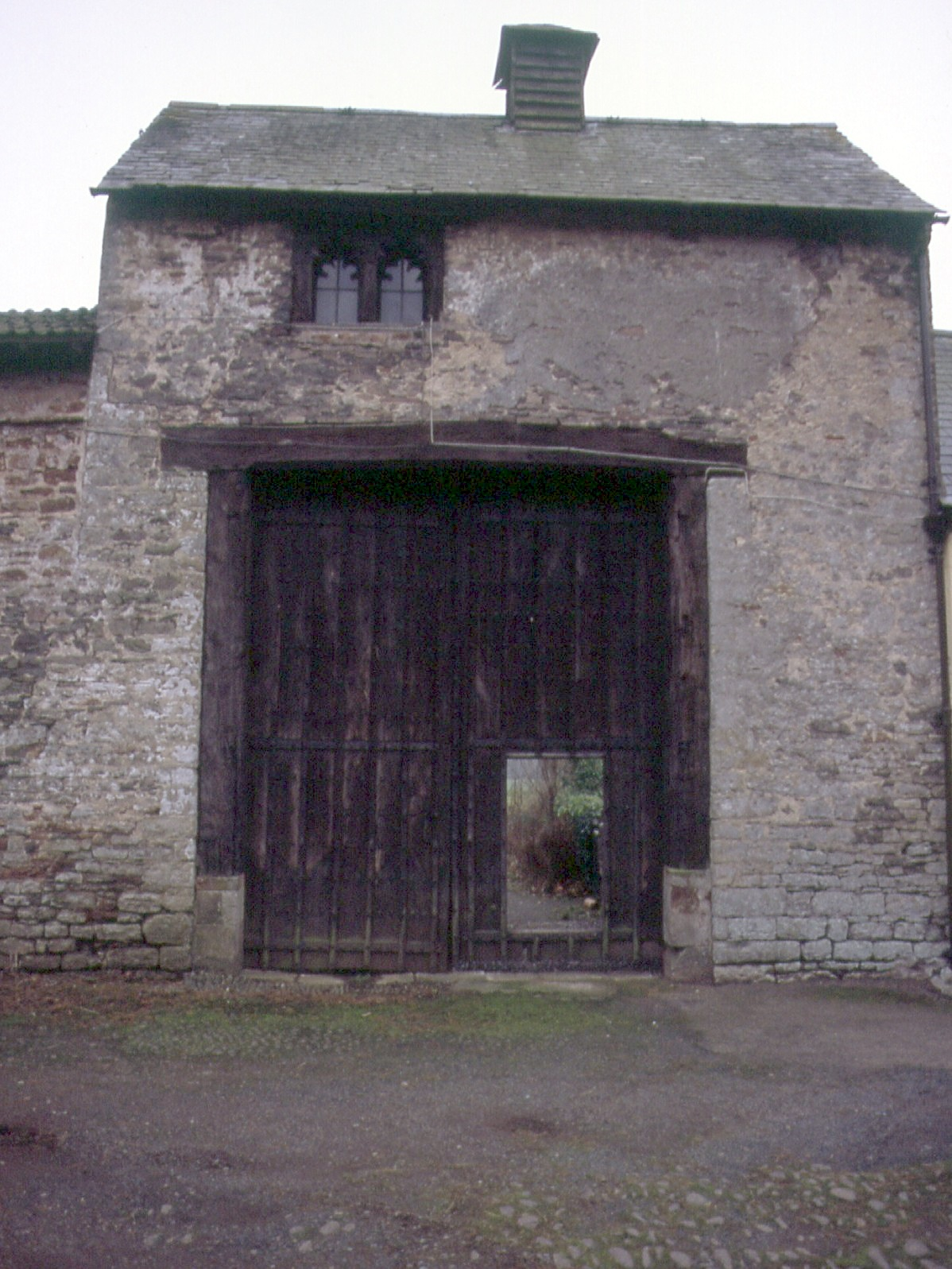
Gatehouse

There have been at least four successive mansion houses at Holnicote. Limited information is available about the early buildings. One is known to have been built between 1493 and 1521, based on dendrochronology from surviving timbers. The Grade II* listed gatehouse and attached cottage were built together with a new house in the early 17th century. Following the purchase of the estate by the Blackford family in 1705, a new mansion house was built on the site of the previous structure. Only the stable block from that building survives. The house was destroyed by fire in 1779. The Acland family re-built it as a thatched hunting lodge, which was also destroyed by fire in 1851, and replaced in 1861. A kitchen extension was added in 1874. The lodge was built in the 19th century. The estate includes several cottages including Rose Bower and the 17th-century Butlers Cottage. An 18th-century Flemish bond red brick granary also exists on the estate.

== Holnicote House in the 20th century ==
Holnicote House was donated to the National Trust by Sir Richard Thomas Dyke Acland, 15th Baronet of Killerton in Devon, whose ancestors had owned it since 1745. In 1936 the lodge became a hotel, but was badly damaged by yet another fire in 1941.

=== Mixed race children at Holnicote House during WW2 ===
Children of African American soldiers and white British women born during World War 2 who lived at Holnicote House until they were 5 years old.

In 1943, Holnicote House was requisitioned by Somerset County Council, initially for use as a nursery for children evacuated from cities during World War 2. However, the council increasingly took children born to white British mothers and Black American GI fathers, possibly as an intentional policy. American GIs, including Black American troops, were stationed all over Britain, with a heavy concentration in south-west England. The children often arrived at Holnicote House as babies, some being only a few days or weeks old. This early placement is likely because at least two-thirds of the babies had married mothers. By 1948, there were 45 mixed race children of Black GIs in Somerset, of whom nearly half were placed in Holnicote House.

Somerset appears to be the only county council which provided homes explicitly for babies born to Black GIs. As Holnicote House was used as a nursery, children were only cared for there up to the age of five, after which they were fostered, adopted or sent to homes for older children. The children who were fostered at Holnicote House tended to be cared for by young nursery nurses. Professor Lucy Bland, who interviewed over sixty children born to white mothers and Black American GI fathers for her 2019 book Britain's 'Brown Babies, talked to five people who were raised at Holnicote House, as well as three nursery nurses who worked there. All spoke very fondly about their time there.

On 23 August 1948, Life magazine published a feature entitled ‘The Babies They Left Behind Them’. This article, which was accompanied by a photo of children from Holnicote House, attracted international public interest in the issue of Britain’s ‘brown babies’ as the estimated 2,000 children from the relationships between Black GIs and white British women were dubbed by the Black American press.

The house is now operated as a hotel.

== See also ==
- List of National Trust properties in Somerset

== Bibliography ==
- Adkins, Lesley; Adkins, Roy (1992). A Field Guide to Somerset Archaeology. Wimborne, Dorset: Dovecote Press. ISBN 978-0946159949.
- Acland, Anne (1981). A Devon Family: Story of the Aclands. Phillimore & Co Ltd. ISBN 978-0850333565.
- Bland, Lucy (2019). Britain's 'brown babies': the stories of children born to black GIs and white women in the Second World War. Manchester University Press.
- Chadwyck-Healey, Charles E. H. (1901). The history of the part of West Somerset : comprising the parishes of Luccombe, Selworthy, Stoke Pero, Porlock, Culbone and Oare. H. Sotheran and Co.
- Collyns, Charles Palk (1862). Notes on the Chase of the Wild Red Deer. Charles Palk Collyns.
- Dunning, Robert (1980). Somerset & Avon. Bartholomew. ISBN 978-0702883804.
- Ekwall, Eilert (1960). The Concise Oxford Dictionary of English Place Names. Oxford University Press. ISBN 978-0-19-869103-7.
- Hancock, Frederick (1897). The Parish of Selworthy in the County of Somerset. Barnicott and Pearce.
- Lauder, Rosemary (2002). Devon Families. Halsgrove. ISBN 978-1841141404.
- Lysons, Daniel; Lysons, Samuel (1822). General history: Gentlemen's seats, forests and deer parks In: Magna Britannia: Volume 6, Devonshire. T Cadell and W Davies.
- Maxwell Lyte, H.C. (1909). A History of Dunster and of the Families of Mohun & Luttree. St Catherine's Press Ltd.
- Ravenhill, Mary; Rowe, Margary (2006). "The Acland Family: Maps and Surveys 1720-1840". Devon and Cornwall Record Society. 49.
- Richardson, Isabel (1996). "A Selworthy Cottage". In Evans, David Morgan; Salway, Peter; Thackray, David (eds.). The Remains of Distant Times: Archaeology and the National Trust. Boydell & Brewer. p. 73. ISBN 9780851156712.
- Roberts, James (1 January 1997). Walking in Somerset. Cicerone Press Limited. ISBN 978-1-85284-253-6.
- Robinson, Stephen (1992). Somerset Place Names. Wimbourne: The Dovecote Press Ltd. ISBN 978-1874336037.
- Vivian, John Lambrick (1895). The Visitations of the County of Devon: Comprising the Herald's Visitations of 1531, 1564, & 1620. Harleian Society.
