= River Aller =

River in Somerset, England

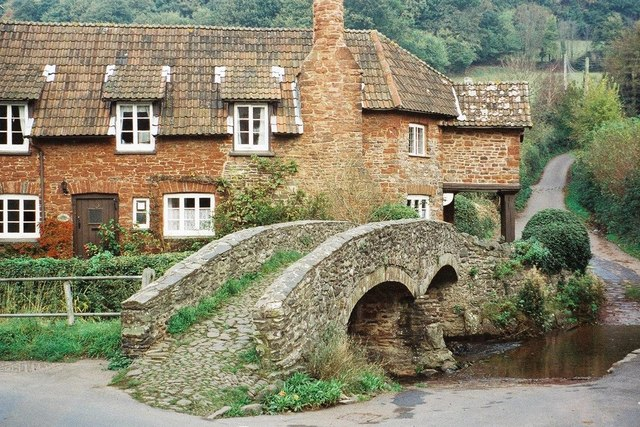
- Packhorse Bridge, Allerford

Location
- Country: England
- State: Somerset
- Region: Exmoor
- District: West Somerset
- City: Allerford

Physical characteristics
- Source
  - location: Holnicote, West Somerset
  - coordinates: 51°11′54″N 3°32′52″W
- Mouth: River Horner
  - location: near Bossington, Somerset
  - coordinates: 51.2035°N 3.5652°W

The River Aller is a small river on Exmoor in Somerset, England.

It rises as several small streams around Tivington and Huntscott and flows through the Holnicote Estate passing Holnicote and through Allerford, where it passes under a packhorse bridge of medieval origin. It then joins the River Horner at Bossington, which flows into Porlock Bay near Hurlstone Point on the Bristol Channel.

Because of the surrounding geology the area has been at risk of flooding. Between 2021 and 2024 the Holnicote Estate and the Somerset Rivers Authority implemented a river restoration technique, reversing the straightening and deepening of the river to create about 7 hectares (17 acres) of new wetlands upstream of Allerford to protect about 100 homes.
