= Descent of Holnicote =

The descent of the Holnicote estate in Somerset, England, is as follows:

== Domesday Book ==
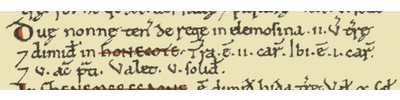
Domesday Book entry for HONECOTE

The Domesday Book of 1086 records HONECOTE as held in-chief from King William the Conqueror by two nuns, by the feudal tenure of frankalmoinage:

Due nonne(s) ten(ant) de rege in elemosina...in HONECOTE ("Two nuns hold from the king in frankalmoin...(extent of land)...in Holnicote").

== de Holne ==
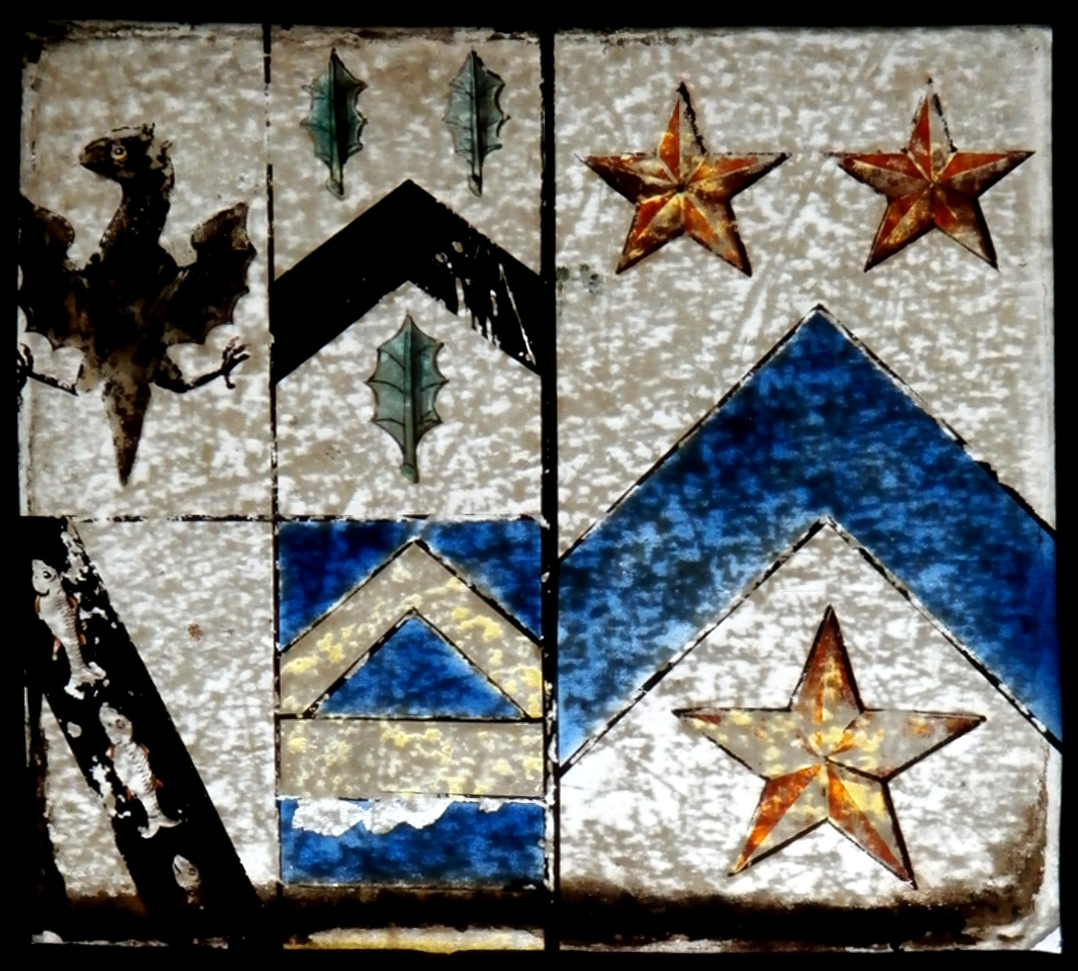
16th century fragment of stained glass now in the stables at Holnicote, formerly in the Staynings manor house. These are the arms of Charles Steyning (d.1592) of Holnicote. The canting arms of de Holne are shown in the 2nd quarter: Argent, a chevron sable between three holly leaves erect proper

William de Holne held the manor in the reign of King Edward I (1272–1307), and in the same reign, according to "Savage", Walter Barun (or Bidun) held a portion of it. Ten acres of arable and two acres of meadow land were held from the king in chief by the serjeanty "of hanging on a certain forked piece of wood the red deer that died of the murrain in the forest of Exmoor, and also of lodging and entertaining at the tenant's expense such poor or decrepit persons as came to him, for the souls of the ancestors of King Edward I". The canting arms of de Holne, Argent, a chevron sable between three holly leaves erect proper, are visible in the second quarter of the arms of Charles Steyning (d.1592) which survive in a 16th-century stained glass window fragment now in the stable block at Holnicote, formerly in the demolished manor house. the arms are as follows:

- 1st quarter Argent, a bat displayed sable (Steyning)
- 2nd: Argent, a chevron sable between three holly (ilex) leaves erect proper (de Holne)
- 3rd: Argent, on a bend sable three fishes (Huish)
- 4th: Azure, a fess in chief a chevron argent (Sprye)(Robert Steyning (d.1483) married Love Sprye of Devon).

All impaling: Argent, a chevron azure between three mullets gules (Pollard), for his wife Margaret Pollard (1561–1631) of Kilve, Somerset, whose monumental brass survives in Selworthy Church.

== Staynings ==
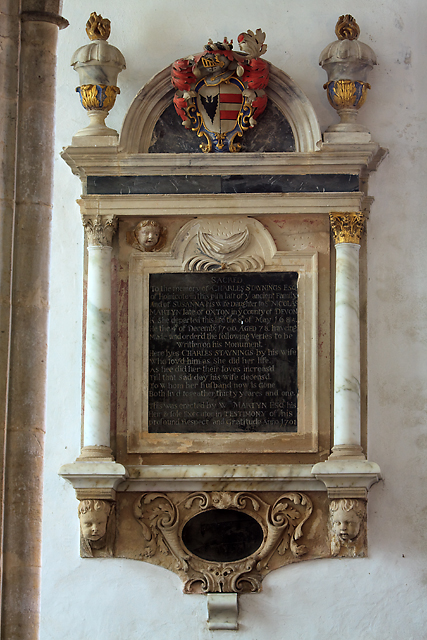
Memorial to Charles Staynings in All Saints Church, Selworthy

A mural monument to Charles Staynings (1622–1700) of Holnicote survives in Selworthy Church inscribed thus:

"Sacred to the memory of Charles Staynings Esqre. of Holnicote in this parish of yt ancient family and of Susanna his wife Daughter to Sir Nicolas Martyn of Oxton in the County of Devon. She departed this lyfe the 8th day of May 1685; He the 4th day of December 1700 aged 78 haveing made and ordered the following verses to be written on his monument:
Here lyes Charles Staynings by his wife,
Who loved him as she did her lyfe,
As hee did her their loves increased,
Till that sad day his wife deceased.
To whom her husband now is gone,
Both lived together thirty years and one.

This was erected by Willm. Martyn, Esqre. his heir and sole executor in testimony of his profound respect and gratitude. Anno 1701"

Above the inscription are emblazoned the arms of Steynings (Argent, a bat displayed sable) impaling Martyn (Argent, two bars gules). Susannah Martyn (d.1685) was a daughter of Sir Nicholas Martyn (1593–1654) of Oxton, Kenton, MP for Devon (1646–1654) and Sheriff of Devon in 1640, whose monument survives in Kenton Church.

== Martyn ==
Arms of Martin: Argent, two bars gules

- William Martyn (1680–1710) of Oxton in the parish of Kenton, Devon, was Susannah Martyn's great-nephew, the eldest son of her nephew Nicholas Martyn (1652–1717) of Netherexe and Oxton by his wife Gertrude St Aubyn, daughter of John St Aubyn of Clowance, Cornwall. The ancient Norman family of Martyn had been feudal barons of Barnstaple. In 1705 William Martyn married a certain Susannah (d.1749).
- William Clifford Martyn (1706–1770), of Oxton, eldest son and heir, who married Elizabeth Langton (d.1753). The marriage was without progeny and on the death of William in 1770 his heir became his first cousin Nicholas Tripe (1711–1790) of Ashburton, son of his sister Susannah Martyn. His eldest son and heir was Rev John Swete (1752–1821), of Oxton, born John Tripe, the authority on landscaping and topographer of Devon.

== Blackford ==
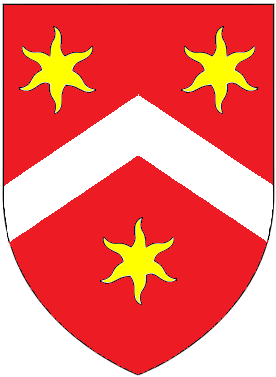
Arms of Blackford of Dunster and Holnicote, Somerset: Gules, a chevron between three estoiles or

Holnicote was then purchased by the Blackford family, whose descent was as follows:

- William I Blackford (d.1728) of Dunster, a Master in Chancery, purchased the estate of Holnicote from "William Martyn". He then purchased the manor of Bossington and later in 1699 purchased from Anthony Stocker and Sarah his wife the manor of Avill (which extended from the ridge of Grabbist nearly to the sea-shore) with land in the parishes of Dunster, Carhampton, Crowcombe, Stogumber, Timberscombe and St. Decumans. He married Elizabeth Dyke, a daughter of John Dyke of Pixton, Somerset. He died in 1728 and was buried at Selworthy.
- William II Blackford (1693–1730), of Holnicote, married Henrietta Collet (1704–1727), daughter and co-heir of Joseph Collet of Hertford Castle in Hertfordshire, an officer of the East India Company and President of Fort St. George in Calcutta. His mural monument survives in Selworthy Church inscribed as follows:

"Near this place is deposited the Body of William Blackford late of Holnicote in this parish Esq. and also ye Body of Henrietta his wife. He was the eldest son and heir of William Blackford of the same place Esqre by Elizabeth the daughter of John Dyke of Pixton in the parish of Dulverton in this county Esqre. He died the ..th of March 1730 in the 37th year of his age. She was one of the daughters and coheirs of Joseph Collet late of Hertford Castle in the county of Hertford Esqre and sometime President of Fort St George in East India. She died the 13th day of September 1727 in the 23 year of her age. Henrietta Blackford their only daughter and heir died the 6th day of December 1733 in the seventh year of her age".

The following arms are shown on the monument: Gules a chevron argent between three etoiles or (Blackford) with escutcheon of pretence: sable, on a chevron argent between three horses passant of the second, three orles of the first (Collet). Crest A negro's head (Blackford).

- Henrietta Blackford (1726–1733), only daughter and sole heiress, who died as an infant aged 7. Her heiress was her cousin Elizabeth Blackford (d.1736), widow of Edward I Dyke of Pixton in Somerset.

== Dyke ==
Arms of Dyke of Somerset: Or, three cinquefoils sable. As seen in east window of Lynch Chapel, Bossington, Somerset, erected in 1884-5 by Sir Thomas Dyke Acland, 11th Baronet (1809–1898). These are also the arms of the Dyke baronets of Horeham, Sussex

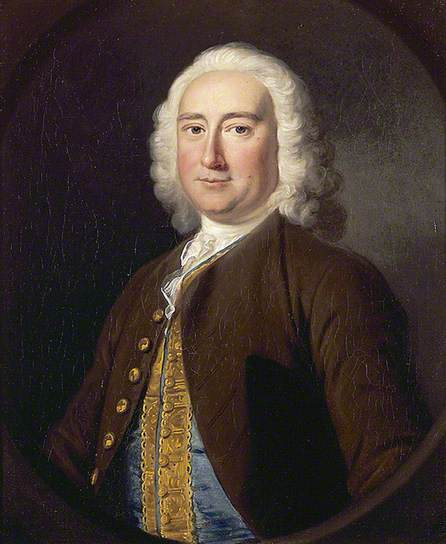
Edward II Dyke (d.1746), portrait circa 1741 attributed to Thomas Hudson (1701–1779), National Trust, Collection of Dunster Castle

- John Dyke (d.1732), son, of Holnicote.
- Edward II Dyke (d.1746), of Pixton, brother and heir. He was the warden and lessee of the royal forest of Exmoor and Master of Staghounds, which office usually was held by the warder. He married Margaret Trevelyan, a daughter of Sir John Trevelyan, 2nd Baronet (1670–1755), of Nettlecombe in Somerset, and widow of Alexander Luttrell (1705–1737) of Dunster Castle. Edward inherited Holnicote and estates in Bampton from his brother John Dyke (d.1732), who died without progeny. Edward died without progeny and bequeathed Pixton to his niece Elizabeth Dyke (d.1753), whom he appointed his sole executor, daughter and sole heiress of his brother Thomas Dyke (d.1745) of Tetton, Kingston St Mary, Somerset. The bequest stipulated that Elizabeth and her husband Sir Thomas Acland, 7th Baronet (1722–1785) of Killerton in Devon and Petherton Park in Somerset, should adopt the additional surname of Dyke.

== Acland ==
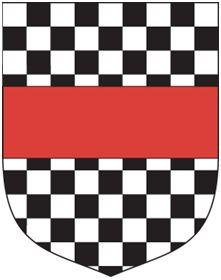
Arms of Acland: Chequy argent and sable, a fesse gules

The Acland family originated in the 12th century at the estate of Acland, from which they took their name, in the parish of Landkey, North Devon. In the opinion of the Devon historian Hoskins (1981), based on the family's early and repeated use of the Flemish firstname of Baldwin, the Acland family probably migrated to England from Flanders soon after the Norman Conquest of 1066. Sir John Acland, 1st Baronet (c. 1591 – 1647) moved his residence from Acland to Columb John, near Exeter, the former seat of his great-uncle Sir John Acland (died 1620), and soon after the family moved again to the adjoining estate of Killerton where they built a grand country house, today the property of the National Trust.

The estate of Holnicote was acquired by Sir Thomas Dyke Acland, 7th Baronet (1722–1785) of Killerton in Devon and Petherton Park in Somerset, by marriage into the family of Dyke. He built kennels for the North Devon Staghounds. The estate passed down through the Acland family until February 1944, when Sir Richard Dyke Acland, 15th Baronet (1906–1990) donated the Holnicote and Killerton Estates to the National Trust, comprising 16,000 acres (6,500 ha), which was the largest ever donation received by the National Trust. The descent of Holnicote in the Acland family was as follows:

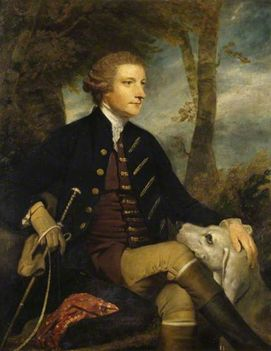
Sir Thomas Dyke Acland, 7th Baronet (1723–1785) painted in 1767 by Sir Joshua Reynolds. Two identical versions exist, both owned by the National Trust, one at Saltram House, the other at Killerton House, both in Devon

- Sir Thomas Dyke Acland, 7th Baronet (1722–1785), who in 1745 married Elizabeth Dyke, the heiress of Holnicote. He was the eldest son and heir of Sir Hugh Acland, 6th Baronet (1697–1728) of Killerton in Devon, by his wife Cicely Wroth, eldest daughter and eventual sole heiress of Sir Thomas Wroth, 3rd Baronet (1674–1721), MP, of Petherton Park, Somerset. He served as Member of Parliament for Devon, 1746–1747, for Somerset, 1767–1768, and was High Sheriff of Somerset in 1751. He was a prominent member of the West Country gentry, and a famous staghunter who used as his hunting seats his wife's Exmoor estates of Pixton and Holnicote. He kept his own pack of hounds, which had formerly been kept by the Dykes. He became forester or ranger of Exmoor under grant from the Crown and "hunted the country in almost princely style. Respected and beloved by all the countryside, he was solicited at the same time to allow himself to be returned as member of Parliament for the counties of Devon and Somerset. He preferred, however, the duties and pleasures of life in the country, where he bore without abuse the grand old name of gentleman". Although he had three of his own kennels on his huge estates, at Holnicote in the north and at Jury and Highercombe near Pixton in the south, he had a further method of keeping hounds, which was to make the keeping of one hound a term in many of the tenancy contracts he granted. In his manor of Bossington (near Holnicote) alone an estate survey of 1746–7 lists twelve tenements let, either by Acland or Dyke, with the requirement to keep a hound. In 1775 he handed over the mastership to the then Major Basset, and in 1779 his beloved collection of stag heads and antlers at Holnicote was lost in a fire which also destroyed the house. He declared that "he minded the destruction of his valuables less bitterly than the loss of his fine collection of stags' heads". He was known on his estates as "Sir Thomas his Honour" (as later was his son the 9th Baronet) and was renown for his generous hospitality at Holnicote or at Pixton, whichever was closest, to all riders "in at the death", and it is said that "open house was kept at Pixton and Holnicote throughout the hunting season". Pixton was the larger establishment, richly equipped with silver-plate and linen, including 73 tablecloths, but both houses had silver dinner services of five dozen plates and any number of tankards, cups, bowls, dishes and salvers. A letter dated 1759 written on behalf of Courtenay Walrond of Bradfield, Uffculme describes the Acland hospitality:

"This noble chase being ended, my master, his brother and Mr Brutton with about 20 gentlemen more waited on Sir Thomas Acland at Pixton where each of them drank the health of the stag in a full quart glass of claret placed in the stag's mouth & after drinking several proper healths they went in good order to their respective beds about 2 o'clock and dined with Sir Thomas the next day on a haunch of the noble creature and about 50 dishes of the greatest rarities among which were several black grouse".

- Sir John Dyke Acland, 8th Baronet (1778–1785), grandson, "Little Sir John", died aged 7.

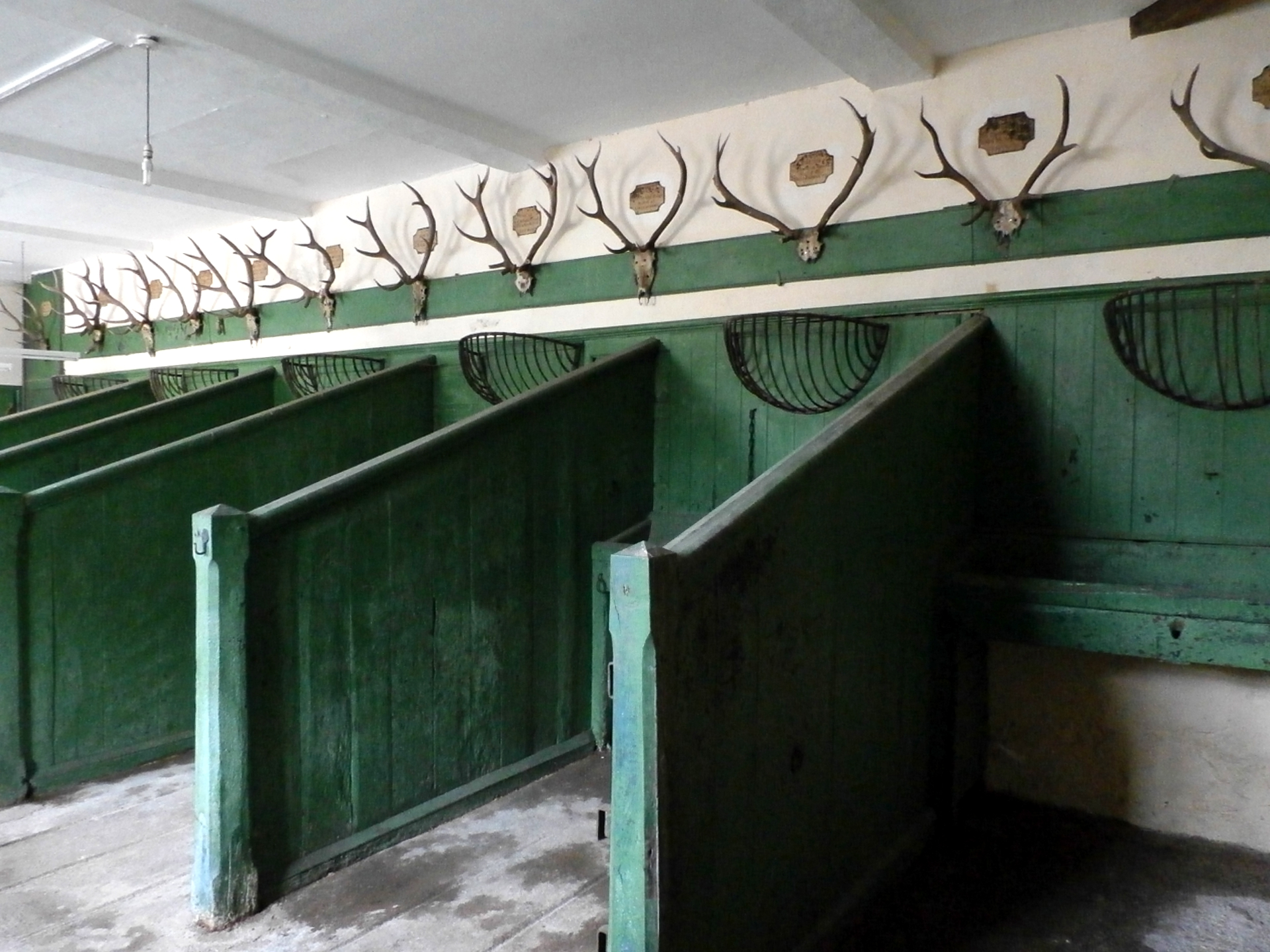
Stalls in stable block built by Sir Thomas Dyke Acland, 9th Baronet (1752–1794) at Holnicote. The thirty stag heads on the walls date from about 1787 to 1793 and were killed under his mastership of the Devon and Somerset Staghounds. A similar collection of stag heads amassed by his father the 7th Baronet, and much beloved by the latter, was destroyed during a fire at Holnicote in 1779

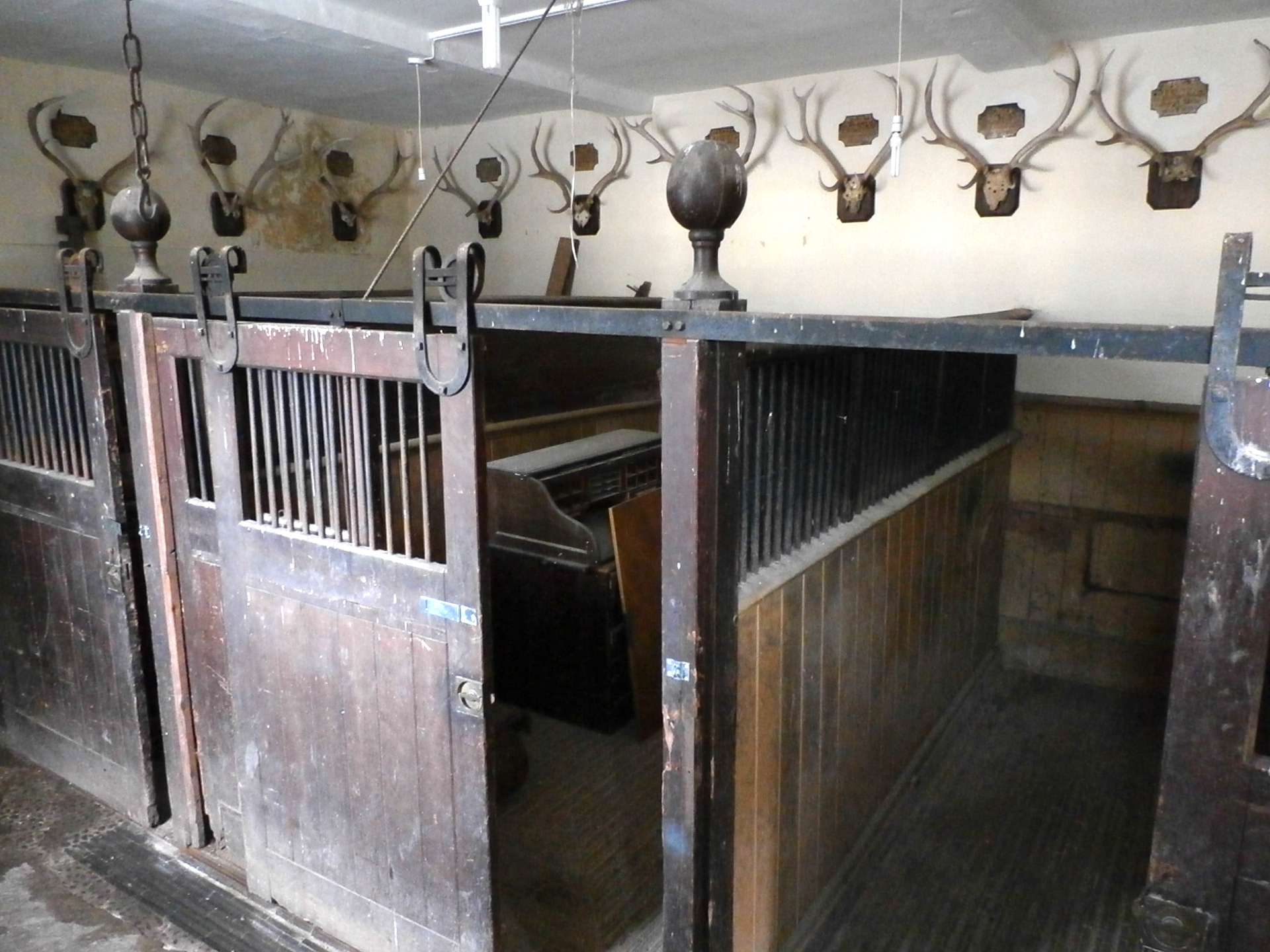
Loose boxes in stable block built by Sir Thomas Dyke Acland, 9th Baronet (1752–1794) at Holnicote, with his stag head trophies

- Sir Thomas Dyke Acland, 9th Baronet (1752–1794), uncle, second son of Sir Thomas Dyke Acland, 7th Baronet (1722–1785). Like his father he was known locally in Devon and Somerset as "Sir Thomas his Honour". His elder brother had predeceased their father, and had left an infant son as heir to the baronetcy. He had not been on good terms with his father, but shared his passion for hunting. His life was largely dedicated to staghunting and he followed his father into the Mastership of the North Devon Staghounds. He virtually abandoned the family's main seat of Killerton in mid-Devon, and resided chiefly at Holnicote and Highercombe, near Dulverton, situated at the north and south edges respectively of the ancient royal forest of Exmoor, renown for its herds of red deer. His hospitality to his fellow staghunters was legendary, as had been that of his father. During the period 1785 to his death in 1794 he killed 101 stags, the heads and antlers of many of which are still displayed in the stables at Holnicote. He was a stern employer of his hunt-staff, and on one occasion when his hounds had killed several sheep, possibly belonging to his farming tenants, he ordered his huntsman "to hang himself and the whole pack".

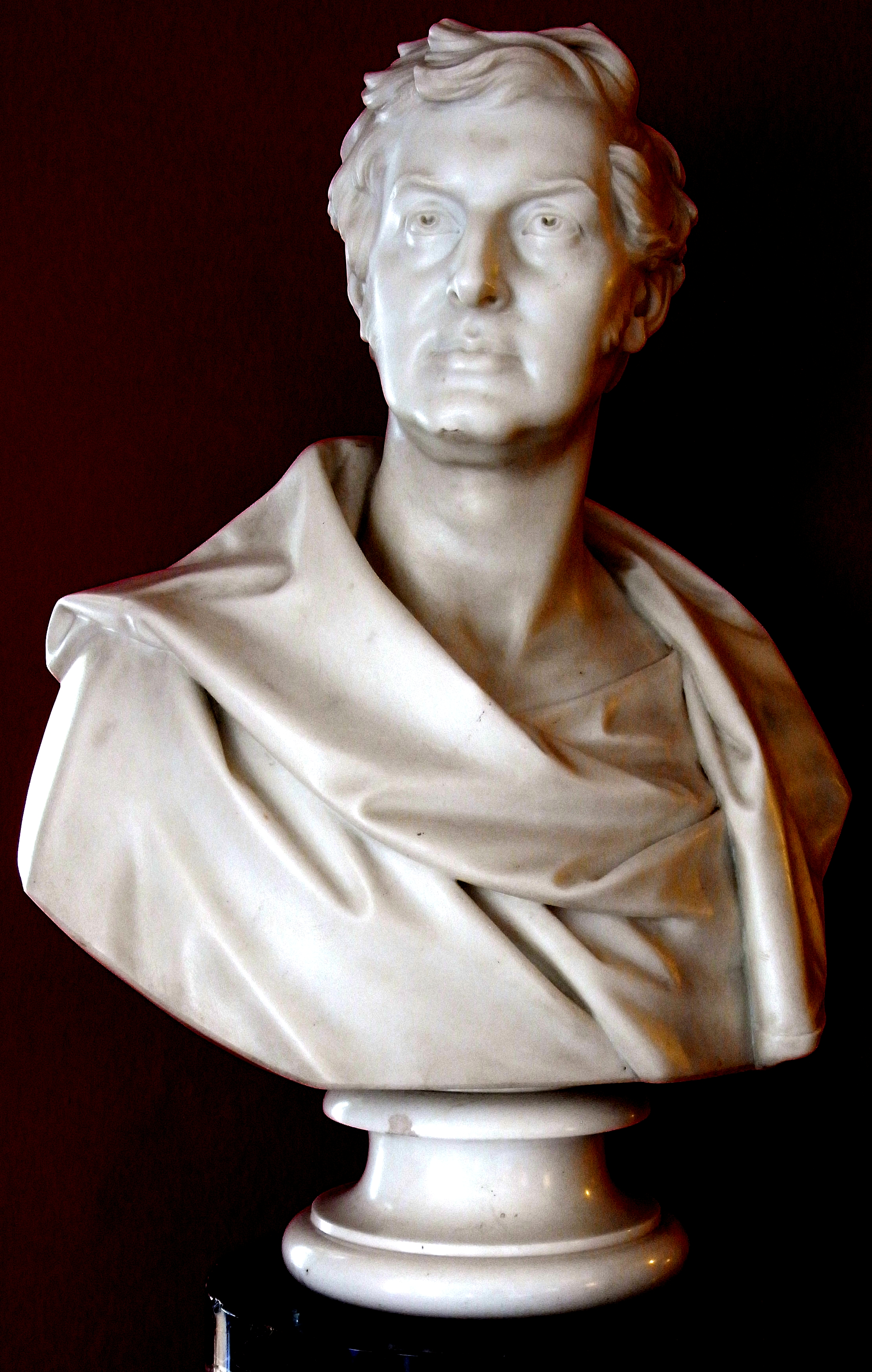
Sir Thomas Dyke Acland, 10th Baronet (1787–1871), "The Great Sir Thomas". 1844 marble bust by Edward Bowring Stephens. Collection of National Trust, Killerton House

- Sir Thomas Dyke Acland, 10th Baronet (1787–1871), son, "The Great Sir Thomas", aged 7 at his father's death, who abandoned the staghunting ways of his father and forever turned the family's focus towards politics and philanthropy. He was High Sheriff of Devon for 1809–10 and Tory Member of Parliament for Devonshire from 1812 to 1818 and again from 1820 to 1831 and for North Devon from 1837 to 1857.
- Sir Thomas Dyke Acland, 11th Baronet (1809–1898), son
- Sir (Charles) Thomas Dyke Acland, 12th Baronet (1842–1919), son
- Sir Arthur Herbert Dyke Acland, 13th Baronet (1847–1926), brother
- Sir Francis Dyke Acland, 14th Baronet (1874–1939), son
- Sir Richard Dyke Acland, 15th Baronet (1906–1990), son, who in 1944 donated the estate to the National Trust.

== Bibliography ==
- Acland, Anne (1981). A Devon Family: Story of the Aclands. Phillimore & Co Ltd. ISBN 978-0850333565.
- Dunning, Robert (1980). Somerset & Avon. Bartholomew. ISBN 978-0702883804.
- Hancock, Frederick (1897). The Parish of Selworthy in the County of Somerset. Barnicott and Pearce.
- Maxwell Lyte, H.C. (1909). A History of Dunster and of the Families of Mohun & Luttree. St Catherine's Press Ltd.
- Pevsner, Nikolaus (1958). South and West Somerset. Penguin.
- Robinson, Stephen (1992). Somerset Place Names. Wimbourne: The Dovecote Press Ltd. ISBN 978-1874336037.
- Vivian, John Lambrick (1895). The Visitations of the County of Devon: Comprising the Herald's Visitations of 1531, 1564, & 1620. Harleian Society.
