= Brown Babies =

Mixed-race babies born to soldiers after WWII

Brown Babies is a term used for children born to black soldiers and white women during and after the Second World War. Other names include "war babies" and "occupation babies." In Germany they were known as Mischlingskinder ("mixed-race children"), a term first used under the Nazi regime for children of mixed Jewish-German parentage. By 1955, African-American soldiers had fathered about 5,000 children in the American Zone of Occupied Germany. In Occupied Austria, estimates of children born to Austrian women and American soldiers ranged between 30,000 and 40,000, perhaps 500 of them biracial. In the United Kingdom, West Indian members of the British military, as well as African-American soldiers in the US Army, fathered around 2,000 children during and after the war. A much smaller and unknown number, probably in the low hundreds, was born in the Netherlands, but the lives of some have been followed into their old age and it is possible to have a better understanding of the experience that would unfold for all of the Brown Babies of World War II Europe.

== Germany ==
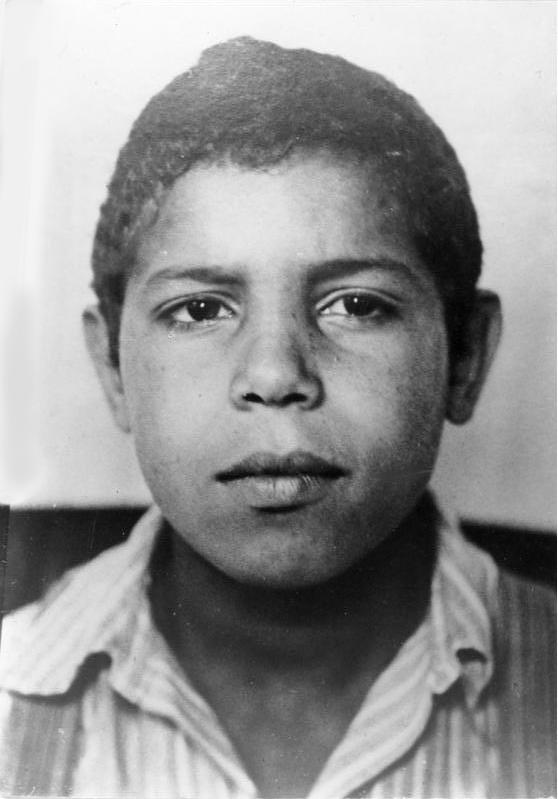
A 1934 photograph of a Rheinlander from the German Federal Archives. From 1933 Afro-Germans were persecuted by Nazi Germany.

The postwar years in Germany brought new challenges, including an ultimately unknowable number of illegitimate children born from unions between occupying Black French, Moroccan, Algerian, and Black American soldiers and native German women. Often the military discouraged fraternization with the locals and any proposed marriages. As an occupying power, the United States military discouraged its forces from fraternizing with Germans. Under any circumstances, soldiers had to get permission of commanding officers in order to marry overseas. As inter-racial marriages were illegal in most of the United States in the era, commanding officers of the U.S. soldiers forced many such couples to split up, or at least prevented their marriages.

As many as 11,040 to 860,000 German women were subjected to mass rape at the hands of allied forces during the occupation of Germany, with the latter estimate resulting from analysis of 'war children’ who were "the product of rape." Reviewing victim statements reported to U.S. forces from early March to early July 1945, historian R.M. Douglas reported that among the accounts where the race of perpetrator was identified, 52% of accounts identified the rapist as black, 41% white, 6% multiple races, and 1% Latino.

=== Post-World War I ===
The German attitude toward Black and German biracial children developed shortly after the first world war. These biracial children totaled to approximately 600, and were referred to as mischlingskinder or "Rhineland Bastards." Although all mischlingskinder were racially persecuted, the kind of external response the children received was dependent on the paternity of the child. Children born from solely African paternity in 1918-1935 were deemed less socially acceptable and more disease-ridden than mischlingskinder born from African-American fathers in 1945–1952. They had become symbols of Germany's defeat and during the Third Reich, some had been placed in concentration camps or may have been murdered, though that was not proven.

=== During World War II and Post-World War II ===
During World War II, Germany sought to differentiate the Mischlingskinder from the accepted, traditional German race through segregation, forced sterilization, and routine physical examination in order to maintain a pure German ancestral line.

Postwar West German law on illegitimate children was complicated, and made even more so when the father was American. Ultimately, they were wards of the state, but the actual responsibility of the family in which they lived if it had a male present. The mother had no rights in the matter and could not be the legal guardian. That designation and financial responsibility fell to the father or to whomever the mother was married, unless he could prove that the child was not his, which was easily accomplished in the case of biracial children. American soldiers and personnel were excluded from responsibility under the law until 1950, when the U.S. agreed that Germany could have jurisdiction over American soldiers.

Orphanages and foster parents were paid small stipends to care for abandoned children. After losing their American partners when soldiers were reassigned out of Germany, many single German mothers often had difficulty finding support for their children in the postwar nation. There was discrimination against black people, as they were identified with the resented occupying forces. Still, a 1951 article in Jet noted that most mothers did not give up their "brown babies." White German families who accepted their mischlingskinder were not received well by doctors and anthropologists, their love for their child was seen as awkward, "monkey love." Some Germans fostered or adopted such children; one German woman established a home for thirty "brown babies."

In the decade after the end of the war, numerous illegitimate mixed-race children were put up for adoption. Some were placed with African-American military families in Germany and the United States. By 1968, Americans had adopted about 7,000 "brown babies." Many of the "brown babies" did not learn of their ethnic German ancestry until they reached adulthood. African American newspapers, which had been vocal about equality in the military during the course of the war, took up the cause of the German and English Brown Babies. The Pittsburgh Courier, in particular, was aggressive in reporting on "Brown Babies turned into sideshow attractions," in the countries in which they had been born, and eventually warned of a possible genocide if they were not protected in Germany.

These international orphans ... in the European Command of the American occupation forces ... are being given away, abandoned, killed because their mothers cannot care for them. And there are 1,435 recorded births (unverified) in the Munich (Germany) area alone.

— William G. Nunn, Pittsburgh Courier, 1948,

The article advocated American adoption of each of the children and began to name and locate them specifically for its African American readership.

A genocide did not occur, but Blackness and German-ness were seen as exclusive entities in early 1950s Germany. and in the 1950s German attitudes about the children began to evolve away from the racism of World War II toward a less hostile society. A popular culture acknowledgment of the issues was the 1952 feature film Toxi. Its title role was played by Elfie Fiegert, an actress who was herself one of the Mischlingskinder of post-World War II. Toxi tells the story of a young mischlingskinder girl taken in by a modern and multigenerational German family that represented the various beliefs and contradictions of postwar German society. Toxi served as the characterization for Afro-German children who, according to the film, often suffered homelessness and neglect. Although the film pulls on the heartstrings of the audience and prompts sympathy for Black occupation children, the film at its core is racist and promotes tolerance of Blackness rather than integration

The children were not always well treated and often discriminated against. In 1952, a World Brotherhood conference was convened among academics, policy makers and media in Wiesbaden to consider the situation faced by the children and declare that it was incumbent on German society to treat them as equals and to support them in the gaining of secure futures. The conference was in part derived from the perceived irony that a defeated, racist Germany had been occupied by a country that was also racially dangerous, and that the German children would be better off if they stayed in the country in which they had been born.

Eventually, many of the German Brown Babies adopted to America began to search for both their parents. Some have returned to Germany to meet their mothers, if they could trace them. Since the late 20th century, there has been new interest in their stories as part of continuing review of the war and postwar years.

== Great Britain ==
Millions of Americans, mostly men, would pass through the United Kingdom in the course of World War II and its aftermath. An undocumented estimate held that 22,000 children of American soldiers would be born into the 1950s, and that perhaps 1,700 of those would come to be called the "Brown Babies of England," the "tan yanks," or "wild oats babies," among other names. They were more often referred to as "half-caste" rather than biracial. They were born starting in Spring 1943 and for the most part in scattered parts of the UK where African American soldiers would be employed in service functions.

At first, Black Americans were generally welcomed by the British people. They were ostensibly welcomed by British officials and military, but with unofficial concern that their presence would be disruptive in a society that knew few Black people except for several thousand who worked mainly in port areas of England. Official Britain was driven in part by the same kind of ambivalence on the matter held by American allies. On one hand, it was not the place of the British government to become involved in American racial matters, but the British command let it be known that it was sympathetic to the social aspects of segregation held by American command, especially when it came to women. "I am fully conscious that a difficult sex problem might be created if there were a substantial number of cases of sex relations between white women and coloured troops," said Home Secretary Herbert Morrison in October 1942, "and the procreation of half-caste children."

Eventually, that ambiguity would play out in the quality of the lives of the resulting children. Though they were, for the most part, not ill-treated they were presumed to be a potential problem for society, and their mothers were regarded by some as the equivalent of prostitutes. In 1944, the League of Coloured People opened an effort to bring attention to the children, whom it "called casualties of war." It convened a "Conference on the Position of the Illegitimate Child Whose Father is Alleged to be a Coloured American." The seventy-five social, governmental and church organizations in attendance were generally compassionate and realistic about the welfare of the children, but their position in society would continue to be ambiguous.

Children of African American soldiers and white British women born during World War 2 who lived at Holnicote House until they were 5 years old.

There would never be a consistent plan and practice for the children's welfare and life prospects. Many ended up in orphanages or in family situations that weren't fully supportive. Though many Britons felt that they should be adopted to America if possible, they were British subjects and law would not allow their adoption out of the country except for a brief period in 1947, nor were their African American fathers legally recognized. The plight of the children became a cause first in the African American press and eventually in some of the popular media directed primarily at white readership. "The American Negro," editorialized the Hartford Chronicle in 1946, "needs to do something about this whole matter. It is not a question of taking the child away from the mother and bringing it here for adoption, but there are more than enough churches, lodges, fraternal organizations, etc. to send a regular stream of funds to England and help raise these youngsters." In 1948, the children were still in England and reported upon in Newsweek as the "Brown Tiny Tims." In 1948, Life magazine pictured a group of the children sitting happily on the lawn of a British orphanage, Holnicote House, under the headline "The Babies They Left Behind Them."

An authoritative work on the children has been documented in a book written by British historian Lucy Bland, Professor of Social and Cultural History at Anglia Ruskin University, in Britain's Brown Babies.

== Netherlands ==
The smaller nation of the Netherlands did not see the birth of as many children of American soldiers as Germany and the United Kingdom, and most war babies were the result of relations between Dutch women and Canadian soldiers involved in the liberation of the country beginning in late 1944.

The southern Limburg Province of the Netherlands, between Belgium and Germany, was liberated before the rest of the country as Allied forces moved from Normandy to Germany. That force included African American soldiers of the Quartermaster Corps, engaged in service work, transport and the beginning construction of the American cemetery at Margraten. The Netherlands had very limited experience with Black people and there were no provisions for the recording of the births of biracial children. Their number was unknown, but has come to be estimated at 70–100. The lives of some in that small community have been followed into the 21st century, and offer a personal narrative that is not available elsewhere in Europe.

Twelve of the group became subjects of research beginning in 2014 with an oral history project, "The Children of African American Liberators," leading to books on the subject published in Dutch, and American versions as well as contemporaneous newspaper articles, as examples in de Volksrant, and NRC Handelsband, and a television documentary broadcast in 2017.

As reflected in the books based on their oral histories, nine of the twelve described childhoods in which they were cared for by inattentive parents or others to whom they had been abandoned. Three had spent time in Catholic orphanages where each was physically and/or sexually abused. Of those who stayed with their married mothers, four were accepted and nurtured by their de facto stepfathers, while three were not and three were sexually abused by step and adoptive fathers.

In their lives, ten faced active discrimination from family and/or society at various points. One attempted suicide, three used therapeutic services throughout their lives and five took on careers or volunteer work in social services. Their need to make a connection with their natural fathers was constant for most. Father identities were known at birth in four cases and three of those fathers were engaged from America in their children's lives into their first years. Five actively searched for unknown fathers at various points of their lives and three were found; two after the deaths of the men involved, and one in time enough that father and daughter could form an active relationship that traveled back and forth between the United States and the Netherlands. One was finally able to arrive at her father's Florida grave several years after his death.

== Representation in media ==
- Brown Babies: The Mischlingskinder Story (2011) is a documentary by American journalist Regina Griffin. The film has been featured on CNN and earned several distinctions, including the Best Film at the African-American Women in Cinema Film Festival (New York City) and HBO Best Documentary finalist at the 2011 Martha's Vineyard Black Film Festival. That fall a related documentary, Brown Babies: Germany's Lost Children (Brown Babies: Deutschlands verlorene Kinder), aired on German television. The fictional film Toxi depicts the dilemma "brown babies" presented to German families at the time. The varying viewpoints of the family members reflect the times they were brought up in serves as a window into the German psyche regarding blacks and mixed-raced children in the 1950s.

These mixed race children were in 1952 described as a "humanitarian and racial problem" by a right wing politician, trying to place the blame for any upheaval they might cause on the children themselves, as opposed to the larger German community that might not accept them. One of the ways German society saw to deal with these children was to send them abroad. This movement was motivated by the reasoning that these Occupation Babies would face insurmountable hostility in their home country. This hostility resulted in part from common resentment of enemy occupation forces, prejudice towards the mothers of these children, and prejudice related to colonial ideologies of race theory and inferiority of the black race. In 1951, the United States recognized these Afro-German children as orphan children under the Displaced Persons Act of 1948. That year, the first Afro-German child was adopted by Margaret E. Butler in Chicago. This transnational adoption was significant because these children had been objectified based on little more than their racial classification. Many Germans wanted to export the children of occupiers to help them avoid racism and to find more of a home in a country with a history of many people of African descent, even though they were segregated in the South. Ultimately, these babies served as a metaphor for blacks to assert themselves in both the European and American contexts.

== See also ==
- Afro-Germans
- Afro-Asians
- Amerasian
- War children
