= Selworthy Beacon =

Hill in Somerset, England

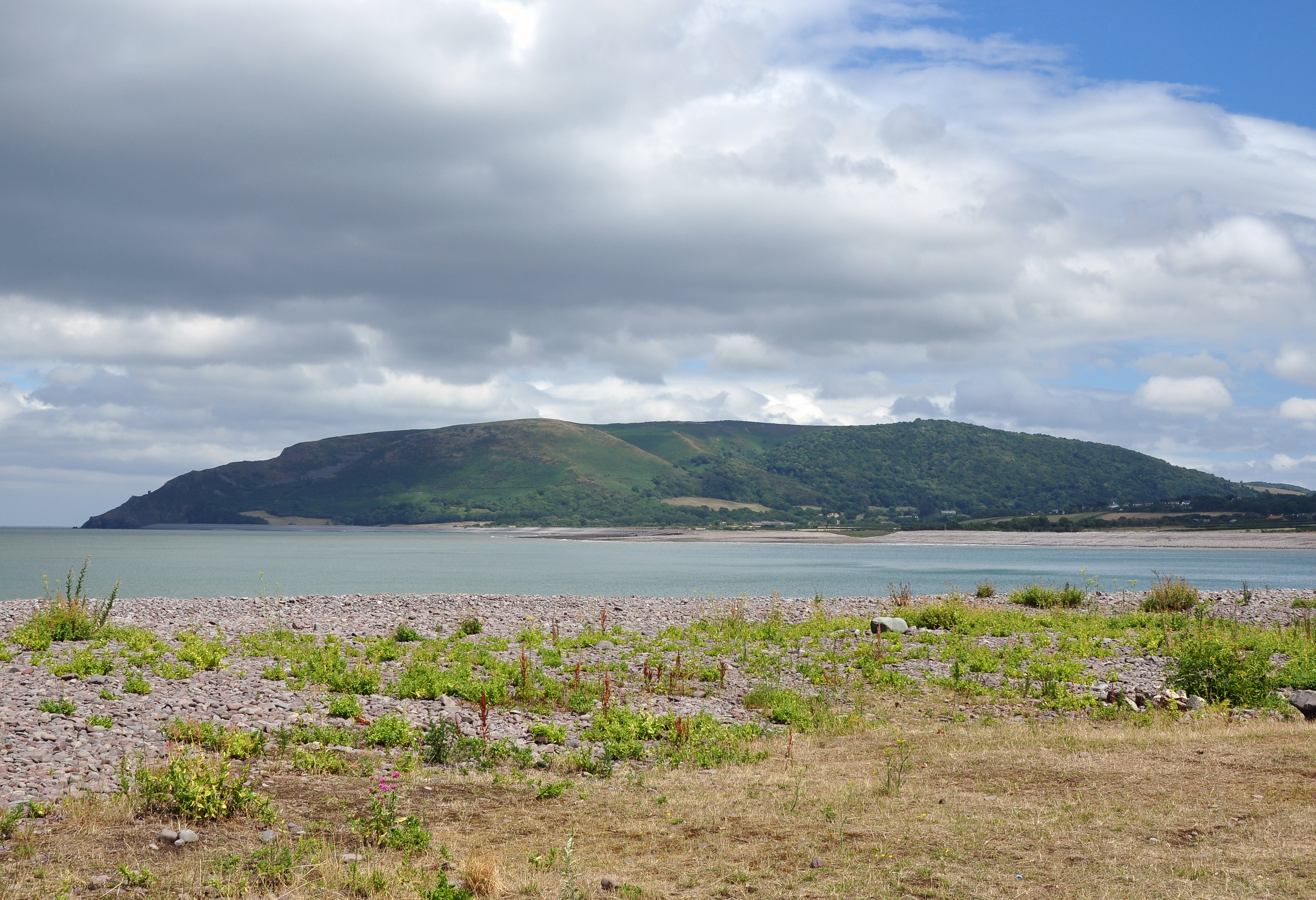
- Selworthy Beacon from Porlock Weir

Highest point
- Elevation: 308 m (1,010 ft)
- Prominence: 193
- Parent peak: Dunkery Beacon
- Coordinates: 51°13′13.69″N 3°32′59.98″W

Geography
- Location within England
- OS grid: SS918479

Climbing
- Easiest route: Hike

Selworthy Beacon is a hill and Marilyn of Exmoor in Somerset, England. It lies within the boundaries of Exmoor National Park, to the north of the village of Selworthy and northwest of Minehead. A road leads to the top, where there is a National Trust plaque and a view of the south coast of Wales across the Bristol Channel. The South West Coast Path also climbs the hill and ends slightly shy of the summit.

== Geography ==
Selworthy Beacon is located in northern Somerset in southwestern England, about 4 miles (6 km) northwest of Minehead, north of the village of Selworthy. Selworthy Beacon is one of three peaks in Somerset, the other two being Dunkery Beacon and Periton Hill. Its elevation is 1,013 feet (309 m). Behind the hill, there are precipitous cliffs. Selworthy Beacon is situated within the National Trust-owned Holnicote Estate. Nearby are the Macmillan Way, Coleridge Way, and a fourteenth-century tithe barn. A signposted walking route to the hill goes through a wooded area of Allerford and Holnicote Plantations, and is 2 miles (3 km) northeast of Porlock.

== History ==
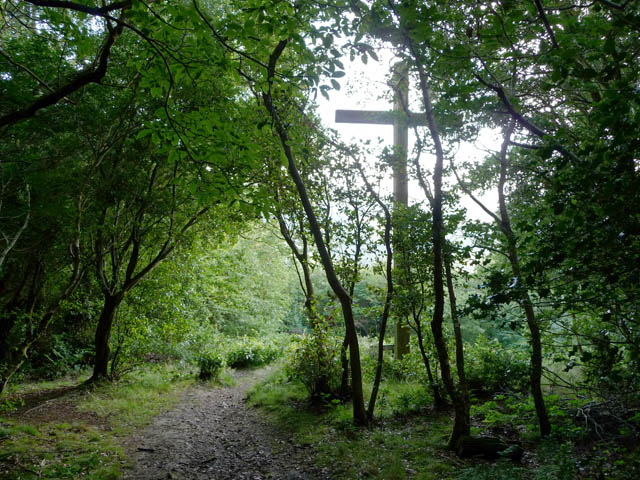
Acland memorial cross

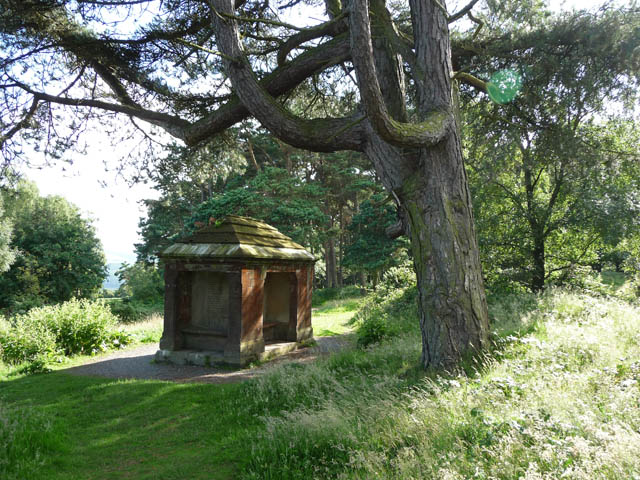
Wind and Weather Hut erected in 1878 by John Barton Arundel Acland for use by the Acland Family on Sunday walks

Near the summit are a series of cairns, thought to be the remains of round barrows, and the British Iron Age Bury Castle. The round cairns have been designated as a scheduled monument. In the sixteenth century, Selworthy Beacon was (as its name implies) the site of a beacon to warn of impending invasions. The mausoleum of Sir Thomas Dyke Acland is located about 0.25 miles (400 m) from Selworthy Beacon.

== Wildlife ==
Typical coastal plants are present, such as Sea Campion and Thrift (Armeria maritima), as well as gorse and heather (Calluna vulgaris).
