= Nobby Clark =

Nobby Clark can refer to:

- Nobby Clark (cricketer) (1902–1982), English cricketer
- Nobby Clark (footballer) (born 1954), Scottish footballer
- Nobby Clark (ice hockey) (1897–1966), Canadian National Hockey League player
- Nobby Clark (photographer), English photographer
- Nobby Clark (politician) (born 1951 or 1952), New Zealand local politician
- Neil "Nobby" Clark (1929–2025), former CEO of National Australia Bank
- Gordon "Nobby" Clark, Bay City Rollers

== See also ==
- Nobby Clarke (1907–1981), English football wing half
- Alfred E. Clarke Mansion in San Francisco, built by Alfred "Nobby" Clarke
- Neil Clarke (Australian footballer) (1957–2003)
- William Clarke (cryptographer) (1883–1961), British intelligence officer and cryptographer of naval codes in both World Wars
- Nobby, nickname
