= Nobby =

Masculine nickname

Nobby is the diminutive form of the name Norbert. It is also a nickname most commonly used in English for those with the surname Clark or Clarke.

== Origins as a nickname ==
A number of possible explanations exist for the use of Nobby as a nickname for people with the surname Clark. These include:

- Clerks in the City of London used to wear Nobby hats, a type of bowler hat. Alternative spellings include "Knobby" and "Clarke".
- 16th century monks wrote letters for the illiterate. These monks were referred to as "Clerks". The outcome of so much writing causes calluses on the fingers "nobs" and therefore "Nobby Clerks" was born.
- In England the term "nob" is used to refer to a member of the aristocracy and by extension a posh person. Clerks were also required to maintain a high standard of dress, and were paid a clothing allowance. The result was that they always appeared smart. A clerk would deal with the common people but would be better educated, better paid and in a position of relative power. To the uneducated, clerks were posh and therefore considered to be "nobs". Hence, nobby Clark. Both the Oxford English and the English Dialect Dictionaries list nobby as being of a rich man, a nob or toff, or “smart”, and gives it a wide distribution, so smart persons were "nobby".

Nobby Clark is also cockney rhyming slang for a shark.

== People ==
- Nobby Clark (disambiguation)
- Cecil Vandepeer Clarke MC (1897-1961), known as "Nobby": soldier in World War I and member of Special Forces in World War II
- Gordon "Nobby" Clark (born 1950), former singer of the Scottish band Bay City Rollers
- Neil Clarke (Australian footballer) (1957–2003)
- William Clarke (cryptographer) (1883–1961), British intelligence officer and cryptographer of naval codes in both World Wars
- Nobby Hunt (1903–1983), English cricketer
- Nobby Lawton (1940–2006), English footballer
- George Nash (rower) (born 1989), English rower
- Brian Noble (rugby league) (born 1961), English rugby league coach and former player
- William Noblett (born 1953), sometime Archdeacon of Prisons
- Nolberto Solano (born 1974), Peruvian retired footballer
- Nobby Stiles (1942–2020), English footballer
- Norbert Tiemann (1924–2012), American politician and 32nd Governor of Nebraska
- Nobby Wirkowski (1926–2014), American football player

== Fictional characters ==
- Georg "Nobby" Hegel, a German philosopher in The Philosophers' Football Match
- Nobby Nobbs, a member of the Ankh-Morpork City Watch in the Discworld fantasy novel series
- The player character in the 1993 video game Nobby the Aardvark
- Nobby the Enchanted Bobby, title character of the comic strip of the same name in The Beano (1952–1954) – see List of Beano comic strips
- Nobby, title character of the strip of the same name in the comics Buzz and later The Topper
- Nobby, in the Enid Blyton book Five Go Off in a Caravan
- Nobby Butcher, the main character in the 2016 film Grimsby, played by Sacha Baron Cohen.
- Zenobia 'Nobby' Hopwood, a character in the P. G. Wodehouse book Joy in the Morning.
- Nobby Cranton, a gentleman thief in the Dorothy L. Sayers book The Nine Tailors.
- Nobby the Sheep, a puppet sheep from the series Ghost Train.
