= The Dark Star (1955 film) =

1955 film directed by Hermann Kugelstadt

- Directed by: Hermann Kugelstadt
- Written by: Hermann Kugelstadt; Maria von der Osten-Sacken
- Produced by: Maria von der Osten-Sacken
- Starring: Elfie Fiegert; Ilse Steppat; Viktor Staal
- Cinematography: Günther Grimm
- Edited by: Luise Dreyer-Sachsenberg
- Music by: Bernhard Eichhorn
- Production company: Wega-Film
- Distributed by: Studio-Filmverleih
- Release date: 15 May 1955
- Running time: 95 minutes
- Country: West Germany
- Language: German

The Dark Star (German: Der dunkle Stern) is a 1955 West German drama film directed by Hermann Kugelstadt and starring Elfie Fiegert, Ilse Steppat and Viktor Staal.

The film's sets were designed by the art director Heinrich Beisenherz.

It has never been screened on television in Germany.

== Cast ==
- Elfie Fiegert as Moni
- Ilse Steppat as Frl. Rieger, die Lehrerin
- Viktor Staal as Casseno
- Paul Bildt as Dr. Schumann, Tierarzt
- Jürgen Micksch as Manuel
- Edith Schultze-Westrum as Frau Lechner
- Gert Fröbe as Deltorri
- Siegfried Breuer Jr. as Christian
- Alexander von Richthofen as Ulli
- Ingeborg Schöner as Linda
- Hansi Knoteck as Frau Casseno
- Maria Marietta as Anita
- Michael Gebühr as Fredy
- Knut Mahlke as Heinz
- Werner Stock
- Nicolas Koline
- Gustl Gstettenbaur as Micky
- Christl Heitlinger as Blanka
- Albert Florath as Ressel sen.
- Wolfgang Büttner as Bellani
- Charly Coleanos
- Anne-Marie Hanschke
- Martin Jente
- Herbert Jovy
- Gusti Kreissl
- Leo Siedler
- Petra Unkel
- Fritz Wepper

== Bibliography ==
- Hans-Michael Bock and Tim Bergfelder. The Concise Cinegraph: An Encyclopedia of German Cinema. Berghahn Books, 2009.
