= River Horner =

River in Somerset, England

River Horner / Horner Water
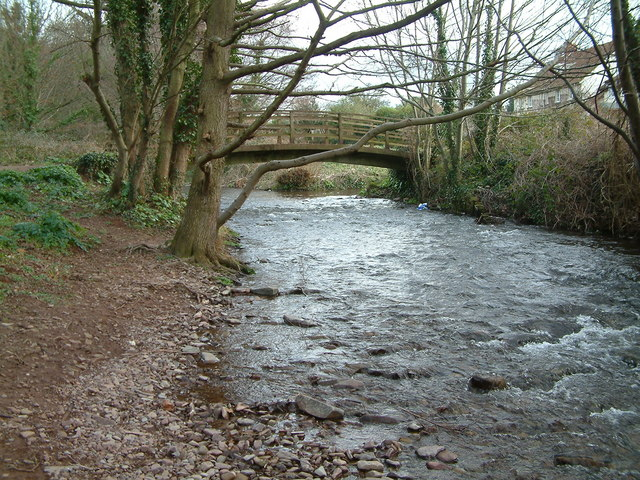
- River Horner at Bossington

Location
- Country: England
- County: Somerset

Physical characteristics
- Source
  - location: near Luccombe, Somerset, England
  - coordinates: 51°11′08″N 3°34′45″W
- Mouth: Porlock Bay, Bristol Channel
  - location: near Hurlestone Point, Somerset, England
  - coordinates: 51°13′31″N 3°35′10″W
  - elevation: 0 m (0 ft)
- Discharge
  - location: West Luccombe
  - average: 0.46 m^{3}/s (16 cu ft/s)
  - minimum: 0.02 m^{3}/s (0.71 cu ft/s)23 August 1976
  - maximum: 11.3 m^{3}/s (400 cu ft/s)18 December 1993

Basin features
- Tributaries
  - right: River Aller

The River Horner, also known as Horner Water, rises near Luccombe on Exmoor, Somerset, and flows past Porlock into Porlock Bay near Hurlstone Point on the Bristol Channel. Most of the river's course flows through the National Trust Holnicote Estate.

The river flows into the sea though a shingle ridge at Bossington beach, where it forms part of the Porlock Ridge and Saltmarsh Site of Special Scientific Interest. When the river level is very high, flood water builds up behind the ridge, causing it to breach.

== History ==
Evidence that the river was previously diverted to power iron workings has been found. The remains of an iron hammer mill and 55m long, breached, embankment dam were excavated alongside the river in 1996.

== Horner Wood ==
The upper reaches of the river flow through Horner Wood, one of Britain's largest ancient oak woodlands of about 800 acres (320 ha) which includes trees at least 500 years old. A renowned oak tree, one of the largest and oldest oaks on Exmoor, is 'The General' (51.18054°N 3.57672°W). The wood is within the Dunkery and Horner Woods National Nature Reserve, with that area considered an important site for mosses, liverworts, lichens and ferns.
