= Toxi =

1952 film directed by Robert A. Stemmle

- Directed by: Robert A. Stemmle
- Written by: Maria von der Osten-Sacken; Peter Francke; Robert A. Stemmle
- Produced by: Werner Ludwig; Hermann Schwerin
- Starring: Elfie Fiegert; Paul Bildt; Johanna Hofer; Ingeborg Körner
- Cinematography: Igor Oberberg
- Edited by: Alice Ludwig
- Music by: Michael Jary
- Production company: Fono Film
- Distributed by: Allianz Filmverleih
- Release date: 15 August 1952
- Running time: 89 minutes
- Country: West Germany
- Language: German

Toxi is a 1952 West German drama film directed by Robert A. Stemmle and starring Elfie Fiegert, Paul Bildt and Johanna Hofer. The film's release came as the first wave of children born to black Allied servicemen and white German mothers entered school.

It was shot at the Wandsbek Studios in Hamburg. Elfie Fiegert was selected to play Toxi after a mass audition held in Munich. Publicity for the film emphasised the similarities between her own story and that of Toxi. The film was the eighth most popular release at the West German box office in 1952. The name Toxi became widely used as shorthand in the German media when referring to Afro-Germans and their social circumstances.

== Plot ==
The melodrama film begins with a young Afro-German girl being left at the doorsteps of the Rose family—white middle-class Germans—assembled for a birthday party. Initially, most family members treat the young girl with relatively welcome arms as they believe she is only giving a performance as a birthday surprise from an aunt. The family later discovers a suitcase that was left on the doorsteps and realize that the young girl, Toxi, has in fact been abandoned. Once the family learns that Toxi has been abandoned there is a shift in feelings regarding their acceptance of her; the possibility of the girl spending more time at the home than was expected forces members of the family to confront their own views on race and discrimination.

One character in particular, Uncle Theodor—the Roses' eldest daughter's husband—is very unsettled by the idea of having Toxi stay in his white household: he does not want Toxi to interact with his two daughters who are about the same age as Toxi. Unlike the other children featured in the film, Toxi is always on her best behavior as her manners and maturity level are well beyond her age. Due to Toxi's mature behavior and her inherent goodness Uncle Theodor eventually realizes that he has made a mistake with his discrimination against her.

By the end of the film, the entire family has approved of Toxi. However, Toxi will not stay with the family, as her father—a former American soldier—shows up at their house to find Toxi and take her back to the States with him.

The film explores themes of racial prejudice, post-war German society, and the challenges faced by the "Brown Babies" or "Mischlingskinder" in 1950s Germany. Through Toxi's experiences, the film addresses the complex social dynamics of the era, including both acceptance and discrimination. These children, estimated to number between 3,000 and 5,000 by the early 1950s, faced numerous social and institutional challenges. The film addresses their stigmatization, the frequent abandonment by both parents, and the difficulties they faced in finding acceptance in post-war German society.

== Cast ==
- Elfie Fiegert as Toxi
- Paul Bildt as Grossvater Rose
- Johanna Hofer as Grossmutter Helene
- Ingeborg Körner as Herta Rose
- Carola Höhn as Charlotte Jenrich
- Wilfried Seyferth as Theodor Jenrich
- Sylvia Hermann as Ilse
- Karin Purschke as Susi
- Elisabeth Flickenschildt as Tante Wally
- Rainer Penkert as Robert Peters
- Ernst Waldow as Ubelhack
- Erika von Thellmann as Frau Übelhack
- Willy Maertens as Kriminal-Inspektor Plaukart
- Lotte Brackebusch as Frau Berstel
- Al Hoosmann as James R. Spencer
- Gustl Busch as Anna
- Julia Fjorsen as Fanny
- Katharina Brauren as Vorsteherin
- Gertrud Prey as Fursorgeschwester
- Ursula V. Bose as Krankenschwester
- Leila Negra as Singer
- Renate Feuereisen as Frau im Wohnwagen
