= Allerford =

Village in Somerset, England

Coordinates: 51.2161°N 3.5691°W

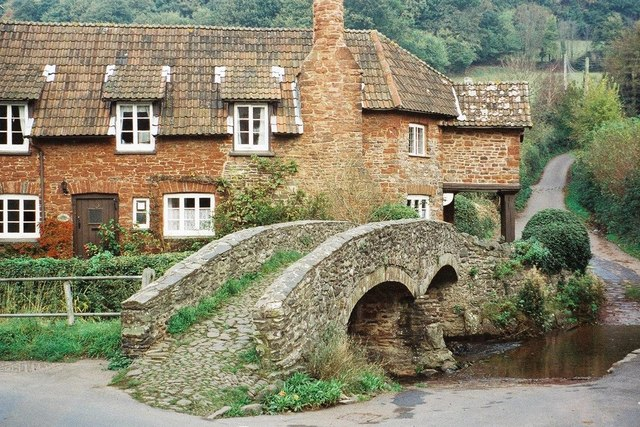
- The packhorse bridge

- Location within Somerset
- OS grid reference: SS905475
- Civil parish: Selworthy
- Unitary authority: Somerset
- Ceremonial county: Somerset
- Region: South West
- Country: England
- Sovereign state: United Kingdom
- Post town: MINEHEAD
- Postcode district: TA24
- Dialling code: 01643
- Police: Avon and Somerset
- Fire: Devon and Somerset
- Ambulance: South Western
- UK Parliament: Tiverton and Minehead

Allerford is a village in the county of Somerset, England, located within Exmoor National Park, and is part of the parish of Selworthy. It appears in Domesday Book as "Alresford – forda Ralph de Limesy Mill".

The parish was part of the hundred of Carhampton.

One of the village's main attractions is the much-photographed packhorse bridge. Built as a crossing over the River Aller (from which the village gets its name), it is thought to be medieval in origin. Nearby is the New Bridge where the A39 road crosses Horner Water. The 18 feet (5.5 m) wide pointed arch rises 8 feet (2.4 m) with a 4 feet (1.2 m) span half arch on the side for flood relief. Originally the bridge was 12 feet (3.7 m) wide but another 6 feet (1.8 m) was added in 1866. The packhorse bridge is an Ancient monument and has been added to the Heritage at Risk Register.

Allerford New Bridge which carries the A39 road past the village is also a Scheduled Ancient Monument and Grade II* listed building. It is also on the Heritage at Risk register because of the risks of vehicle damage and erosion.

The village is also home to Allerford House, childhood home of Admiral John Moresby, who explored the coastline of New Guinea and for whom Port Moresby, the capital city of Papua New Guinea, was named. Other traditional sights in the village include thatched cottages, a forge and an old-fashioned red telephone box. There is also a Reading Room, built by the Acland family to foster adult education.

One of the thatched cottages operated as the local Primary School between 1821 and 1981 and is now a museum containing the West Somerset Rural Life Museum and Victorian School. The museum houses the West Somerset Photographic Archive.
