= West Somerset Rural Life Museum and Victorian School =

Small museum in England

West Somerset Rural Life Museum, Victorian classroom and West Somerset Photographic Archive
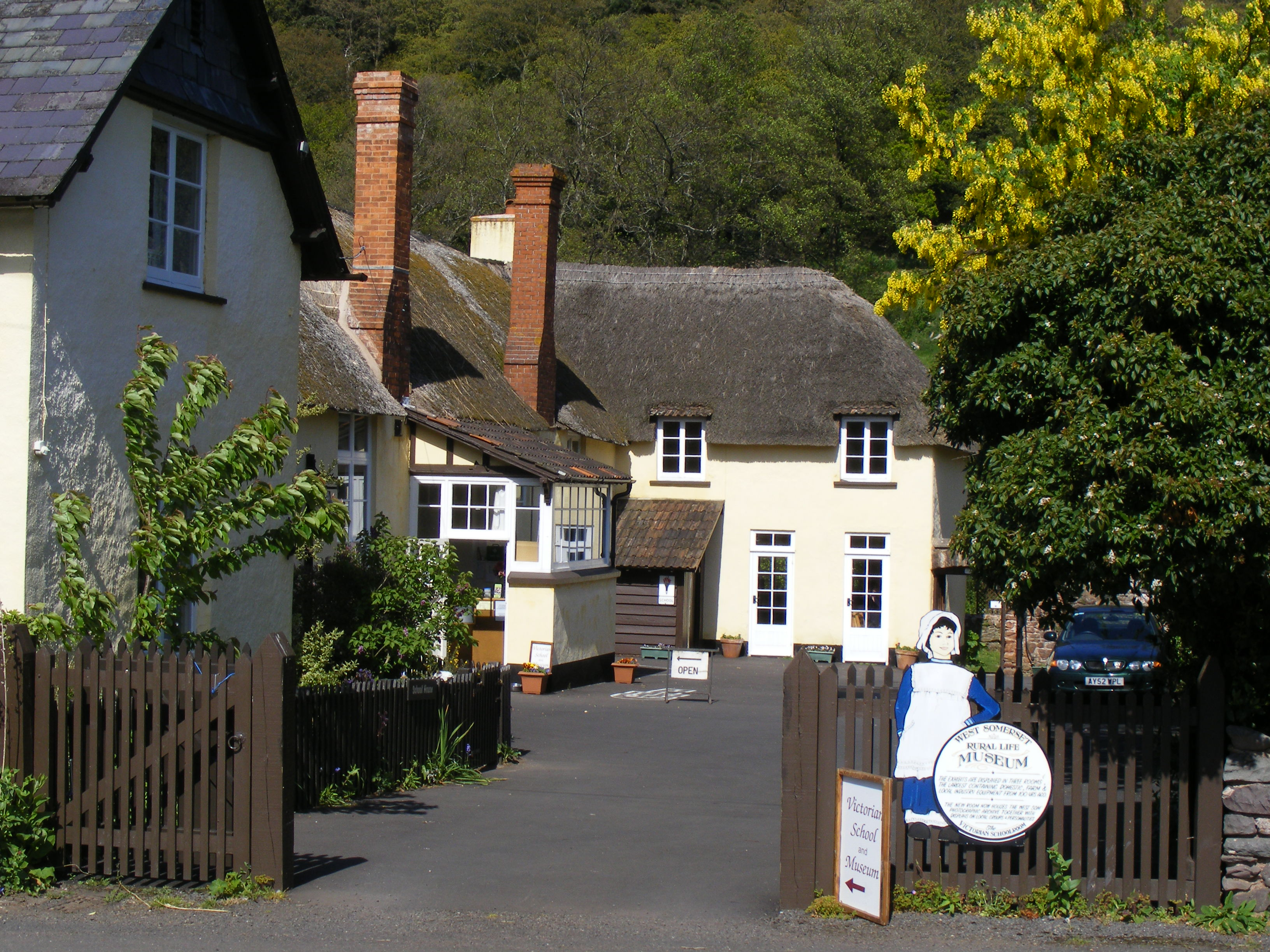

- Location within Somerset and the United Kingdom
- Established: 1984
- Location: Allerford, Somerset, England.
- Coordinates: 51.2116°N 3.5695°W
- Website: http://www.allerfordmuseum.org.uk

The West Somerset Rural Life Museum is a small museum in Allerford, Somerset, England.

The building was built in 1821 as the village school and was closed in 1981. It is now rented from the National Trust. In 1983 it was opened as a museum, by a charitable trust, with displays of artefacts from West Somerset including cookery, laundry, tradesmen's tools, and agricultural equipment.

One room in the thatched part of the building has been retained as a Victorian classroom, where children can dress in original clothing, sit at original desks and do writing on slates. The other rooms contain domestic and farm equipment. There is also a photographic archive and outdoor display area. Occasional demonstrations of local crafts are also hosted at the museum.
