= Elfie Fiegert =

German actress

Elfie (Elfriede) Fiegert (born April 1946, in Freising, Bavaria, West Germany) is an Afro-German film actor who became famous as a child actor for playing the lead role in the film Toxi (1952) filmed when she was five years old. This was followed in 1955 with the film The Dark Star which has erroneously been described as a sequel. At the age of seventeen she had a small role in The House in Montevideo (1963).

== Toxi ==
Elfie did not receive a credit for her role in Toxi. She was described as playing herself. The publicity for the film suggested that the story of the film, a young Afro-German girl being abandoned, reflected Elfie's own origins, and she came to use the stage name Toxi.

The name Toxi also became widely used as shorthand in the German media when referring to Afro-Germans and their social condition.

== Later career ==
Reflecting upon Elfie's career as an example of racial stereotyping, Heide Fehrenbach suggests that whilst as a child actor, Elfie was typecast as a black child of the US occupation of Germany post-1945; the onset of puberty meant that she became exoticised, sexualised and geographically removed from Germany.

In 1964, she married the Nigerian student Christopher Nwako in Munich, in 1965 they had a son, Okwudili John Nwako, in Munich. After they divorced, she resumed her acting career. She also appeared in documentaries on CBS and NBC. In 1986, it was reported she had remarried, living in Mallorca for the past 9 years and visiting Germany infrequently.

== Filmography ==
- Toxi (1952)
- Stars Over Colombo (1953)
- The Dark Star (1955)
- Two Bavarians in the Harem (1957)
- Our Nifty Aunts (1961)
- The House in Montevideo (1963)
- Our Nifty Aunts in the South Pacific (1963)
- Our Crazy Aunts in the South Seas (1964)
- Salto Mortale (1969)
- NBC Experiment in Television: Color Me German (1969)
- Our Doctor is the Best (1969)
- Half and Half: Mischlinge in Germany (1972)
