= Bury Castle, Selworthy =

Iron Age hillfort in Somerset, England

Bury Castle
- Selworthy, Somerset, England
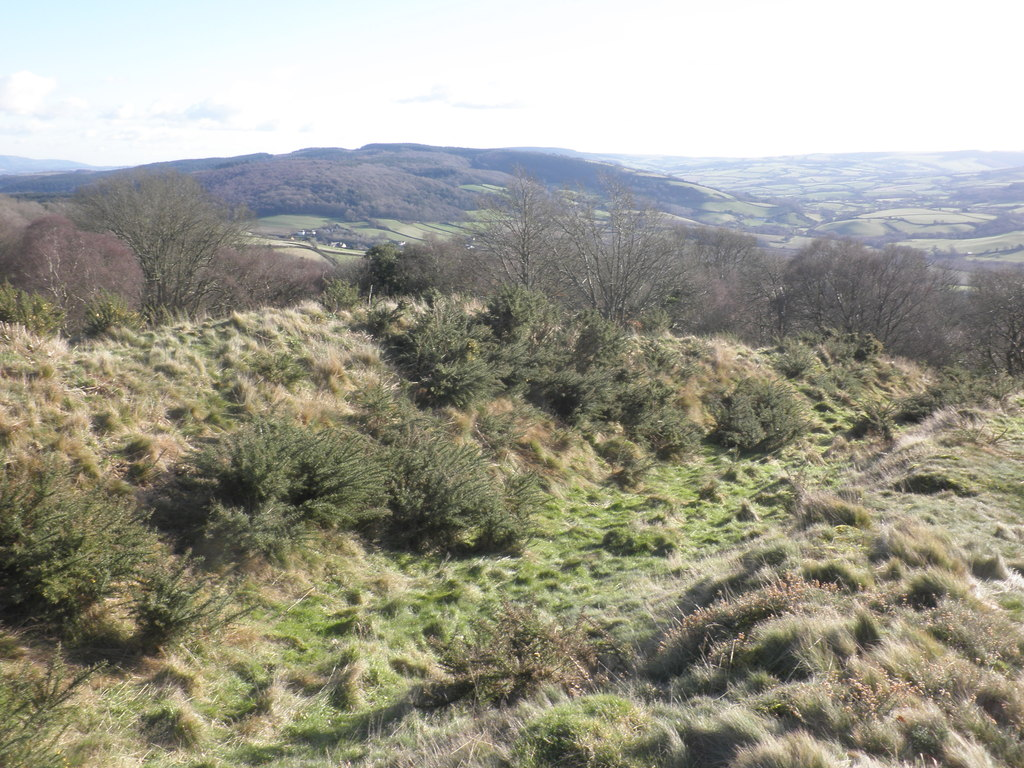
- The site of Bury Castle

Site information
- Type: Hillfort
- Owner: National Trust
- Open to the public: Yes

Location
- Shown within Somerset and the British Isles
- Coordinates: 51.2134°N 3.5512°W
- Grid reference: grid reference SS917471

Bury Castle is an Iron Age hillfort near Selworthy, Somerset, England. It has been designated as a scheduled monument.

== History ==
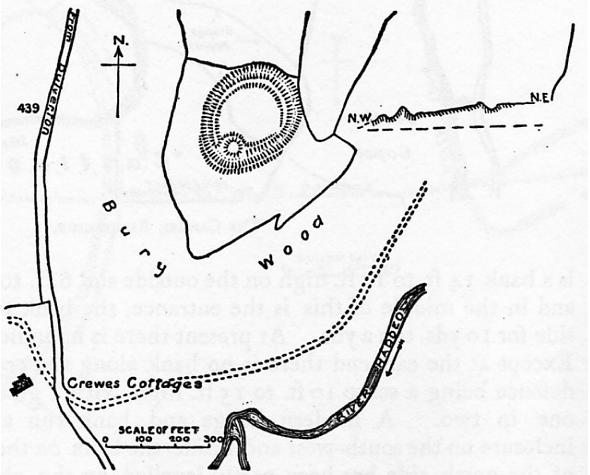
Plan of the Bury Castle site

Bury Castle was built on a spur of land overlooking the surrounding terrain. The Bury Castle hillfort covers 0.2 hectares (0.49 acres) in internal area. The main enclosure has a single rampart and ditch, with steep drops on the north, east and south sides. The bank is up to 1.6 metres (5 ft 3 in) high with a ditch 2 metres (6 ft 7 in) deep. There is an additional rampart 30 metres (98 ft) to the west, with a deep ditch. The rampart is revetted with drystone walling.

=== Today ===
Bury Castle is today protected as a Scheduled Monument and owned by the National Trust. It has been added to the Heritage at Risk Register due to vulnerability from scrub or tree growth.

== See also ==
- Castles in Great Britain and Ireland
- List of castles in England
- List of hillforts and ancient settlements in Somerset
- Hillforts in Britain
- Hillfort
