= Porlock Bay =

Bay in Somerset, England

Porlock Ridge and Saltmarsh
- Site of Special Scientific Interest
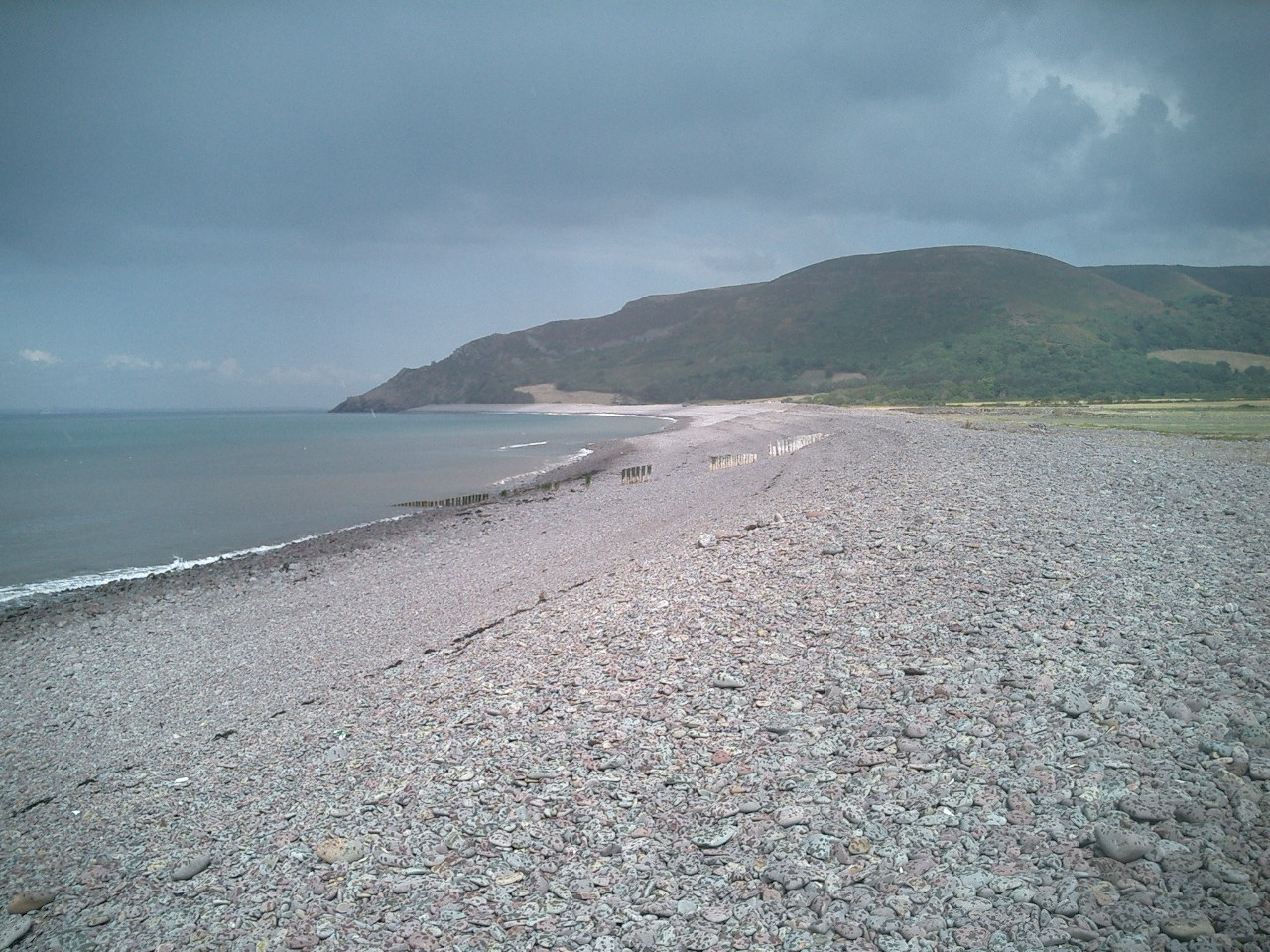

- Location within Somerset
- Location of Porlock Ridge and Saltmarsh.
- Area of search: Somerset
- Grid reference: SS880479
- Coordinates: 51.21928°N 3.60508°W
- Interest: Biological
- Area: 186.3 hectares (1.863 km^{2}; 0.719 sq mi)
- Notification date: 1990

Porlock Bay is on the Bristol Channel, between Hurlstone Point and Porlock Weir in Somerset, England.

The coastline includes shingle ridges, salt marshes and a submerged forest. In 1052 the Saxon king, Harold, landed at Porlock Bay from Ireland, and burnt the town before marching on London.

Much of the coastline is under the care of the National Trust, and the coastline forms part of the South West Coast Path.

== Porlock Ridge and Saltmarsh ==
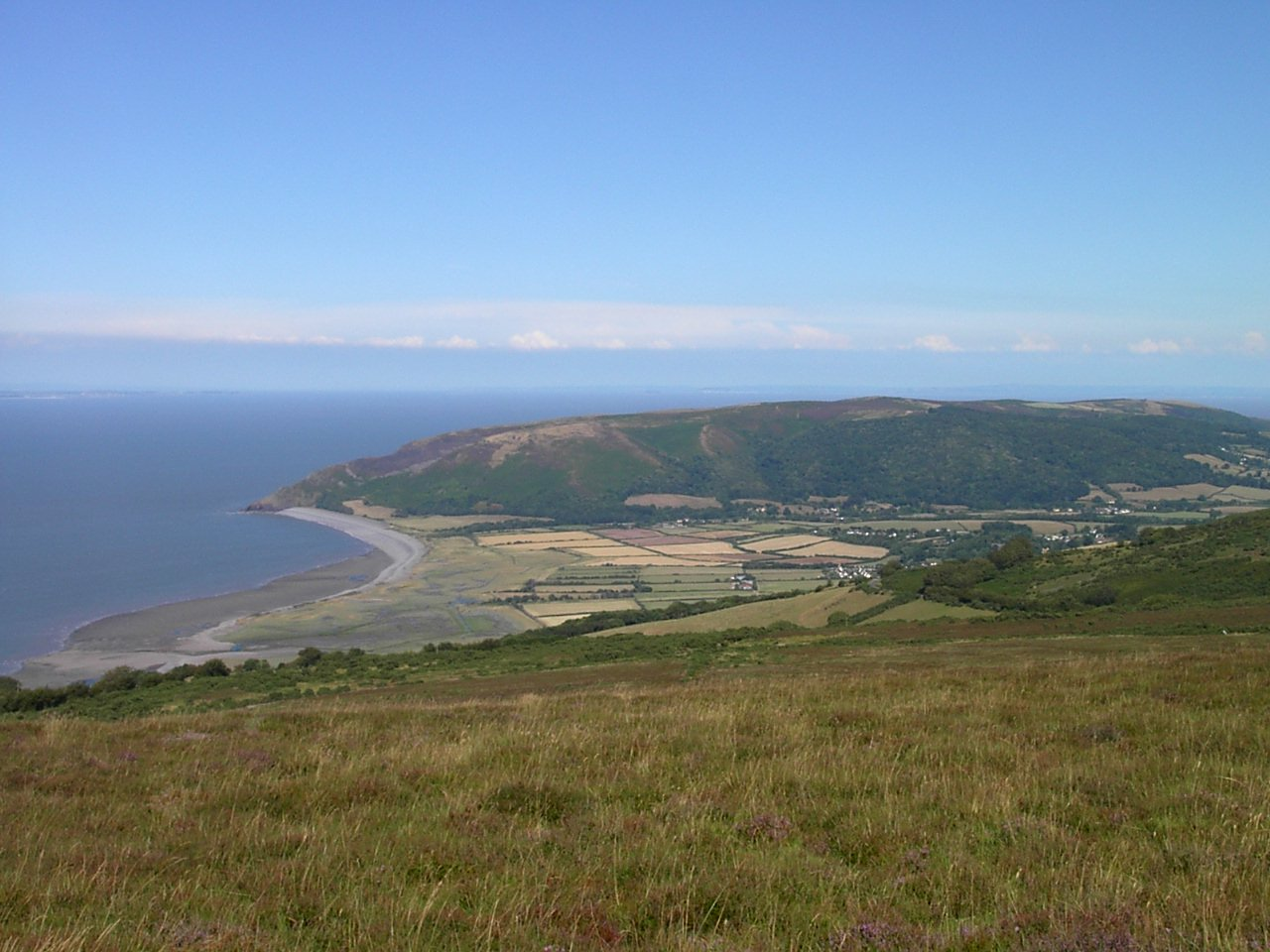
Porlock Bay looking from Porlock Hill towards Hurlstone Point.

Porlock Ridge and Saltmarsh (grid reference SS880479) is a 186.3 hectare (460.4 acre) biological Site of Special Scientific Interest on Porlock Bay, notified in 1990.

This site is notified for its nationally important active coastal geomorphological features. It is also nationally important for the salt marsh and coastal vegetated shingle habitats which occur here.

At Bossington a shingle beach, through which flows the River Horner, rising sea levels in the 1990s caused the creation of salt marshes and lagoons developed in the area behind the boulder bank.

=== Geomorphological ===
This site comprises a shingle ridge and associated saltmarsh hinterland extending for a distance of approximately 4 kilometres along the west Somerset coast, immediately north of Porlock village. The type of geomorphological development seen at Porlock has been noted for coastal shingle systems elsewhere (e.g. west coast of Newfoundland, Canada). Although other UK systems probably developed and are developing in a similar manner, Porlock provides the only fully documented example of a nationally important coastal geomorphological system which has undergone catastrophic failure and subsequent evolution following sediment inhibition and a great storm in October 1996 which caused the single ridge to be breached allowing the marsh to be inundated with salt water at New Works (the drainage facilities for the previous managed fresh water marsh). This storm created a brand new tidal lagoon, which since that storm is rapidly developing with creeks forming and land that was recently farmed pasture now tidal salt marsh.

=== Biological ===
A large part of this site is lower saltmarsh dominated by common glasswort (Salicornia europaea andannual) and sea-blite (Suaeda maritima). Also found here is the nationally scarce Babington’s leek (Allium ampeloprasum ssp. babingtonii). The site is visited regularly by grey heron (Ardea cinerea), little egret (Egretta garzetta) and shelduck (Tadorna tadorna). Small winter flocks of lapwing (Vanellus vanellus), curlew (Numenius arquata), and teal (Anas crecca) occur on the site as a whole. The site is also visited by a very wide range of migratory species.

In 2013 an oyster farm was created with the first harvest being taken in 2016.

== Submerged forest ==
At low tide the remains of a submerged forest can be seen on Porlock Beach. The area was several miles inland until the sea level in the Bristol Channel rose about 7,000 to 8,000 years ago.
