= William Clarke (cryptographer) =

British intelligence officer and cryptographer

William Francis "Nobby" Clarke (1883–1961) was a British intelligence officer and cryptographer of naval codes in both World Wars.

== Background and early life ==
Clarke was educated at Harrow School and Magdalen College, Oxford, and trained as a lawyer, being admitted to the bar in 1906 by his father, Sir Edward Clarke, a prominent lawyer and later Solicitor-General.

== Naval career ==
In 1915, he was commissioned as an assistant paymaster, having failed the eye examination for executive officer. He knew German, and in March 1916 joined Room 40. His talent was for information analysis rather than code-breaking. He was on duty during the Battle of Jutland, and was unimpressed by the inefficient handling and distribution of intelligence. When Clarke and Francis Birch were chosen in 1919 to write a history of Room 40, their outspoken criticism of the Navy's mishandling of intelligence led to the history being allegedly "suppressed" in Clarke's opinion.

== Later career ==
In 1919, Clarke joined the Government Code and Cypher School, working for four years on American diplomatic traffic. In 1924 he was promoted to head of the new naval section in GC&CS, holding the position to 1941. He was succeeded as head by his colleague Francis Birch, and then concentrated on Italian naval codes, retiring in October 1945.

== Death and burial ==
Clarke died in 1961, and he was buried at Church of All Saints, Selworthy.
