= Church of All Saints, Selworthy =

Church in Somerset, England

Church of All Saints
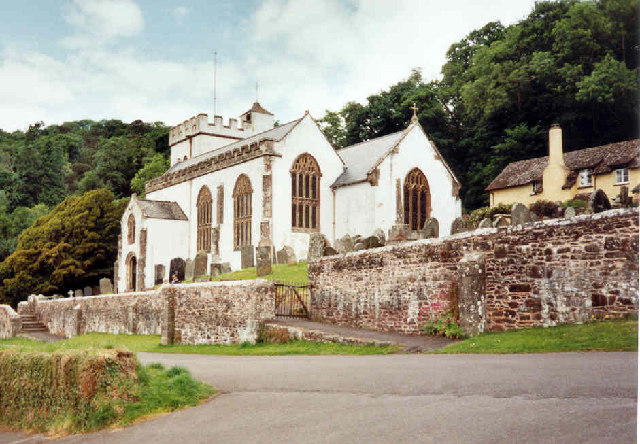

- Location within Somerset

General information
- Location: Selworthy, England
- Coordinates: 51.2102°N 3.5476°W
- Completed: 15th century

The Church of All Saints which sits on a hillside above Selworthy, Somerset, England is a whitewashed 15th-century Church, with a 14th-century tower. It has been designated by English Heritage as a Grade I listed building.

The pulpit includes a 17th-century hourglass and the iron-bound parish chest dates from the same time. Within the church is a copy of the Chained Book of 1609 by Bishop John Jewel, entitled Defense of the Apologie of the Church of England.

In the churchyard is a medieval cross with three octagonal steps, a square socket, and an octagonal shaft. The head is missing. The churchyard provides views across the valley to Dunkery Beacon.

The Second World War cryptographer, William Clarke is buried there.

== See also ==
- Grade I listed buildings in West Somerset
- List of Somerset towers
- List of ecclesiastical parishes in the Diocese of Bath and Wells
