= Lucy Bland =

British historian

Lucy Bland FRHistS is a British professor of social and cultural history at Anglia Ruskin University. Much of her work focuses on the history of British sexuality, feminism, gender relations and race relations between the 1880s to 1980s. Her book 'Britain's "Brown Babies"' won the Social History Society prize for best book of social and cultural history for 2019. Her research, now online as a digital exhibition, won the 2021 Museums Association's best 'Digital Engagement Award'.

== Selected publications ==
- Britain's 'Brown Babies': the Stories of Children born to Black GIs and White Women in the Second World War, Manchester University Press, Manchester, 2019
- Modern Women on Trial: Sexual Transgression in the Age of the Flapper. Manchester University Press, Manchester, 2013.
- "Hunnish Scenes' and a 'Virgin Birth': a 1920s Divorce Case of Sexual and Bodily Ignorance", History Workshop Journal, 2012.
- "The Trials and Tribulations of Edith Thompson: The Capital Crime of Sexual Incitement in 1920s England", Journal of British Studies, 43(3), 2008.
- "British Eugenics and 'Race Crossing': a Study of an Interwar Investigation", New Formations, 60 (2007).
- "White Women and Men of Colour: Miscegenation Fears in Britain after the Great War", Gender & History, 17(1), 2005.
- Sexology in Culture: Labelling Bodies and Desires. Polity Press, Cambridge; University of Chicago Press, Chicago, 1998. (With L. Doan)
- Sexology Uncensored: The Documents of Sexual Science. Polity Press, Cambridge; University of Chicago Press, Chicago, 1998. (With L. Doan)
- Banishing the Beast: English Feminism and Sexual Morality, 1885–1914. Penguin, London.
