= Hurlstone Point =

Promontory of land on the coast of England

Coordinates: 51.2318°N 3.5789°W

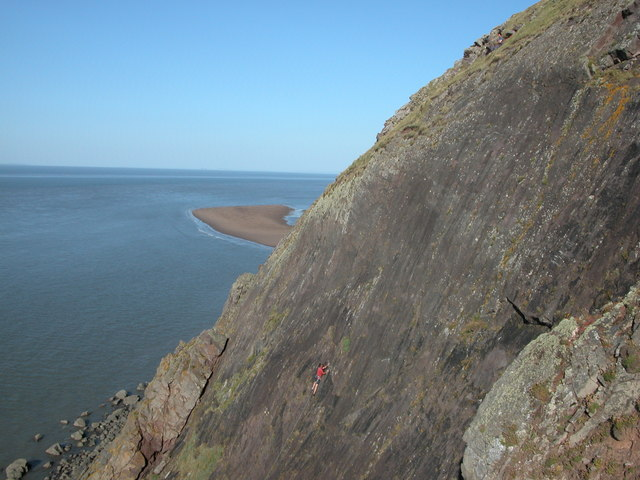
Climbing on Hurlstone Point

Hurlstone point (grid reference SS898492) is a promontory of land between Porlock Weir and Minehead in the Exmoor National Park on the coast of Somerset, England.

Hurlstone Point marks the boundary between Porlock Bay and Blue Anchor Bay in the Bristol Channel and is on the South West Coast Path. There is a coastguard lookout shelter on the point.

The rocks, including a large slab known as "coastguard wall" are popular with climbers.

In 2007 a cyclist was rescued after falling 40 feet (12 m) down the cliff.
