= Selworthy =

Village in Somerset, England

Coordinates: 51.2104°N 3.5512°W

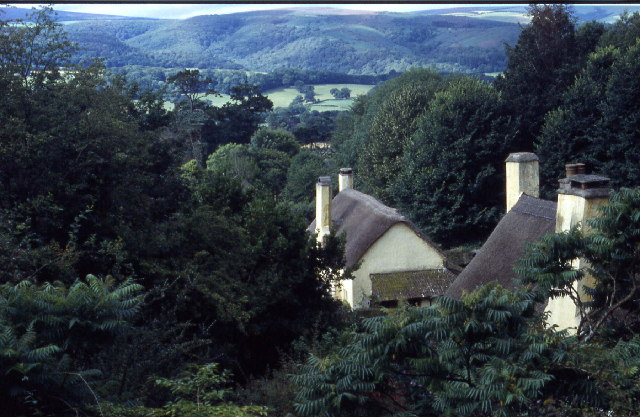
- Looking over the village in Selworthy Combe

- Location within Somerset
- Population: 426 (Parish, 2021)
- OS grid reference: SS917468
- Unitary authority: Somerset
- Ceremonial county: Somerset
- Region: South West
- Country: England
- Sovereign state: United Kingdom
- Post town: MINEHEAD
- Postcode district: TA24
- Dialling code: 01643
- Police: Avon and Somerset
- Fire: Devon and Somerset
- Ambulance: South Western
- UK Parliament: Tiverton and Minehead

Selworthy is a village and civil parish in Somerset, England. The village lies 3 miles (5 km) west of Minehead, its post town. As well as the small village of Selworthy itself, the parish also covers surrounding rural areas, including the hamlets of Allerford, Bossington, and Tivington. Much of the parish forms part of the Holnicote Estate, owned by the National Trust. It lies within the Exmoor National Park. At the 2021 census, the parish had a population of 426.

At 308 metres (1,010 ft) Selworthy Beacon, rising above the village, is one of the highest points on Exmoor. Its height defines as one of the 'marilyns" in England. Near the summit are a series of cairns, thought to be the remains of round barrows, and the British Iron Age Bury Castle.

Bossington is separated from Porlock Bay by a shingle beach, through which flows the River Horner, forming part of the Porlock Ridge and Saltmarsh Site of Special Scientific Interest. In the 1990s rising sea levels created salt marshes, and lagoons developed in the area behind the boulder bank. The village is on the South West Coast Path.

== History ==
The name of the village means "enclosure or settlement near sallows or willows". In the Domesday Book it was recorded as Selewrda. It was held by Queen Edith of Wessex in 1066 and, with Luccombe, was awarded to Ralph de Limesy by William the Conqueror. In 1301 Edward I awarded it to Henry de Pynkeny. It passed down through the family until acquired by marriage by Sir Thomas Dyke Acland in 1802.

Selworthy was part of the hundred of Carhampton.

Selworthy was rebuilt as a model village, to provide housing for the aged and infirm of the Holnicote estate, in 1828 by Sir Thomas Acland, in a similar style to Blaise Hamlet, Bristol, which had been built a few years earlier. One of the cottages, known as Periwinkle Cottage, is now an award-winning tea room. Many of the other cottages, whose walls are painted with limewash that has been tinted creamy yellow with ochre, some of which are now rented out, are still thatched and are listed buildings. The village and the surrounding Holnicote estate was given to the National Trust in 1944 by Sir Richard Acland, having been passed down through the Acland family for nearly 200 years.

Few of the buildings preceding 1828 survive, but those that do include the church, the tithe barn and Tithe Barn Cottage.

== Governance ==
Selworthy shares a grouped parish council with the civil parish of Minehead Without. The parish council has responsibility for local issues, including setting an annual precept (local rate) to cover the council's operating costs and producing annual accounts for public scrutiny. The parish council evaluates local planning applications and works with the local police, district council officers, and neighbourhood watch groups on matters of crime, security, and traffic. The parish council's role also includes initiating projects for the maintenance and repair of parish facilities, as well as consulting with the district council on the maintenance, repair, and improvement of highways, drainage, footpaths, public transport, and street cleaning. Conservation matters (including trees and listed buildings) and environmental issues are also the responsibility of the council.

Until the recent (2023) formation of the unitary Somerset Council, the village was within the non-metropolitan district of Somerset West and Taunton, which was established on 1 April 2019. Before that, it was previously in the district of West Somerset, which was formed on 1 April 1974 under the Local Government Act 1972, and part of Williton Rural District before that.

Somerset Council is responsible for building control, local roads, council housing, environmental health, markets and fairs, refuse collection and recycling, cemeteries and crematoria, leisure services, parks, and tourism. Somerset Council is also responsible for local services such as education, social services, libraries, main roads, public transport, policing and fire services, trading standards, waste disposal and strategic planning.

As Selworthy falls within the Exmoor National Park some functions (including those related to town planning) normally administered by district or county councils have, since 1997, fallen under the Exmoor National Park Authority, which is known as a 'single purpose' authority, which aims to "conserve and enhance the natural beauty, wildlife and cultural heritage of the National Parks" and "promote opportunities for the understanding and enjoyment of the special qualities of the Parks by the public", including responsibility for the conservation of the historic environment.

It is also part of the Tiverton and Minehead county constituency represented in the House of Commons of the Parliament of the United Kingdom. It elects one Member of Parliament (MP) by the first past the post system of election.

== Church ==
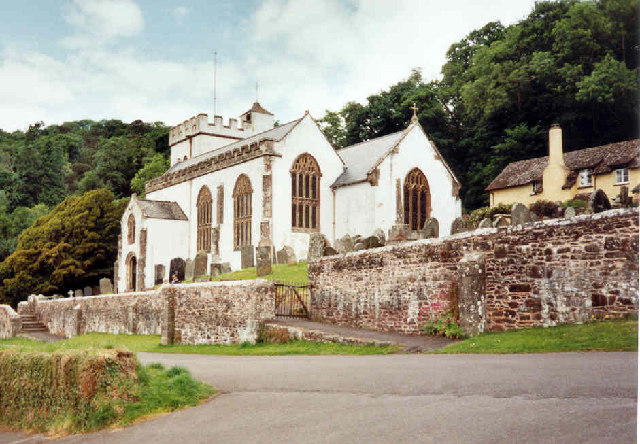
All Saints' church

On the hill above the village is the whitewashed 15th-century Church of All Saints, with a 14th-century tower. The pulpit includes a 17th-century hourglass and the iron-bound parish chest dates from the same time. Within the church is a copy of the Chained Book of 1609 by Bishop John Jewel, entitled Defense of the Apologie of the Church of England.

It has been designated as a Grade I listed building.

In the churchyard is a medieval cross with three octagonal steps, a square socket, and an octagonal shaft. The head is missing. The churchyard provides views across the valley to Dunkery Beacon.

The liturgical scholar and church historian Francis Carolus Eeles OBE is buried in the churchyard.

The thatched Chapel of St Leonard, Tivington was built in the mid 14th century as a chapel of ease. It is a Grade II* listed building.

The Lynch Chapel Of Ease at West Lynch dates from around 1530.

== Demography ==
The population of the parish of Selworthy is 477; this has grown by 100 since 1801 when the population was 418. It has a predominantly ageing population with 80% being over 45 years old.

== Gallery ==
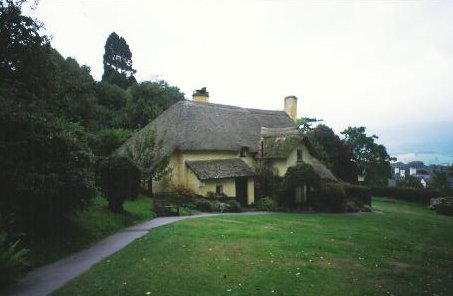
Tea room

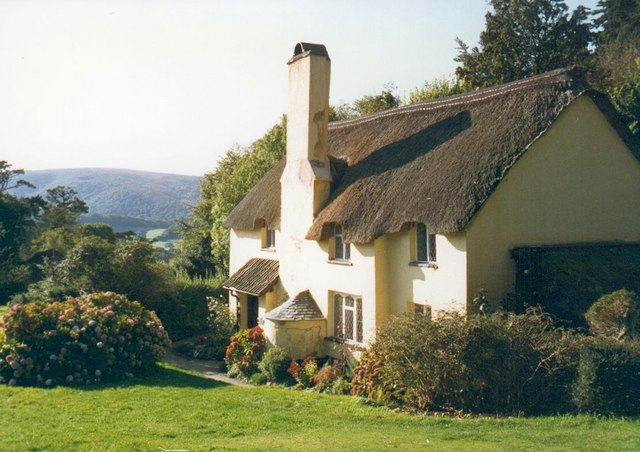
Thatched cottage
