= Feudal barony of Dunster =

English feudal barony

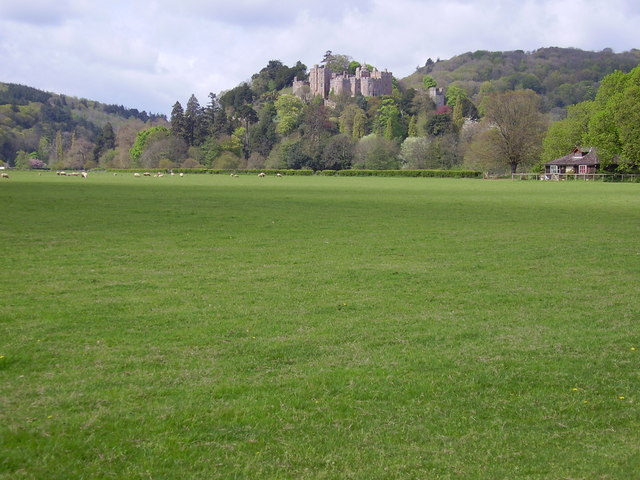
Dunster Castle, caput of the feudal barony of Dunster. Situated on a strategically defensive tor, at one time the seat of an Anglo-Saxon named Dun, in the valley of the River Avill

The feudal barony of Dunster was an English feudal barony with its caput at Dunster Castle in Somerset. During the reign of King Henry I (1100–1135) the barony (or "honour") comprised forty knight's fees and was later enlarged. In about 1150 the manors retained in demesne were Dunster, Minehead, Cutcombe, Kilton and Carhampton in Somerset, and Ham in Dorset.

== Descent ==
=== de Mohun ===
The historian the Duchess of Cleveland wrote as follows in her 1889 work Battle Abbey Roll concerning the origins of the de Mohun (alias Mohon, Moion, etc.) family:

"From Moion, near St. Lo, Normandy, where the site of their castle is still to be seen. Wace tells us that "old William de Moion had with him many companions" at the Battle of Hastings, and one of Leland's rolls of the Norman conquerors is nothing but a long list of those who came in the train of "Monseir William de Moion le Veil, le plus noble de tout l'oste." It gives him a following worthy of an Emperor, comprising all the noblest names of Normandy, and numbering at least ninety-four knights, but it is evidently, as Mr. Planché points out, a mistake of the copyists. Sir Francis Palgrave, though he calls him "one of the greatest Barons of the Cotentin," says he was only accompanied by "five knights who held of him." Dugdale, however, gives him "forty-seven stout Knights of name and note," and he was rewarded for his services by the grant of no less than fifty-five manors in Somerset, besides two in Wiltshire and Dorset. He chose Dunster — a place of some note in Saxon times — and built his castle where a former fortress of the West Saxon kings had stood, in a situation unsurpassed in beauty by any in England".

The descent of the de Mohun family, feudal barons of Dunster, was as follows:

==== William de Moyon (died post 1090) ====
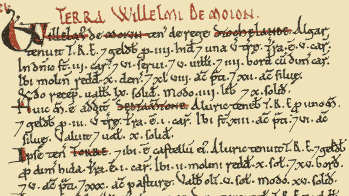
Domesday Book, Somerset, start of chapter listing 55 land-holdings of William de Moyon in Sumersete, first three entries are: Stochelande (Stockland), Seaberton and Torre (Dunster): TERRA(E) WILLELMI DE MOION ... ipse ten(et) TORRE; ibi e(st) castellu(m) ei(us); Aluric tenuit T(empore) E(dwardi) R(egis); geld(aba)t p(ro) dim(idia) hida ... ("LANDS OF WILLIAM DE MOYON ... he himself holds DUNSTER; there is his castle; Aluric held (it) in the time of King Edward; it paid geld for half a hide ...")

William de Moyon (died post 1090) (alias de Moion, later de Mohun), Domesday Book holder of Dunster Castle, 1st feudal baron of Dunster, was Seigneur of Moyon near Saint-Lô in Normandy and was Sheriff of Somerset in 1086. He was the founder of the English de Mohun family, prominent in the Westcountry, extinct in the male line seated at Dunster in 1375 and extinct in the junior male line seated at Mohuns Ottery in Devon at about the same time. He is recorded in the Domesday Book of 1086 as holding the manor of Torre (i.e. Dun's Tor) in demesne and "having his castle there".

==== William de Mohun, 1st Earl of Somerset (died circa 1155) ====
William de Mohun, 1st Earl of Somerset (died circa 1155) (son), created Earl of Somerset, which title was not inherited by his heirs. He was a favourite of Empress Matilda and a loyal supporter of her in the war against King Stephen, during which he earned the epithet "Scourge of the West"

==== William de Mohun (died 1176) ====
William de Mohun (died 1176) (heir). During his tenure the barony comprised forty-six and a half knight's fees held by different military tenants. In the opinion of Maxwell-Lyte:

"It may fairly be surmised that the number had been originally fixed at forty and that one had been acquired by marriage. Five and a half knights' fees are distinctly stated to have been "of the new feoffment", that is to say creations of the period subsequent to the reign of King Henry I, and when an aid was levied in 1168, on account of the marriage of the King's daughter, William III de Mohun refused to pay on more than forty-one, persisting in this refusal until the end of his life".

==== William de Mohun (died 1193) ====
William de Mohun (died 1193) (son)

"The Crusader" a Knight died during the 3rd Crusade en route to Jerusalem with Richard the LionHeart. Brought back to England. Buried at Dunster Castle.

==== Reginald I de Mohun (1185–1213) ====
Arms of Mohun of Dunster, adopted at the start of the age of heraldry (circa 1200–1215), probably by Reginald de Mohun (1185–1213): Or, a cross engrailed sable

Canting arms of Mohun of Mohuns Ottery: Gules, a maunch ermine the hand argent (here shown proper) holding a fleur-de-lis or

Reginald I de Mohun (1185–1213) (heir), who in 1205 married Alice Brewer, 4th sister and co-heiress of William Brewer, feudal baron of Horsley, Derbyshire and of Torr Brewer (later Tor Mohun, now Torquay, in Devon). She brought him a great estate, and "is set down among the benefactors to the new Cathedral Church of Salisbury, having contributed thereto all the marble necessary for the building thereof for twelve years."

==== Reginald II de Mohun (1206–1258) ====
Reginald II de Mohun (1206–1258) (son), who married twice: firstly to Hawise Fleming, daughter and heiress of William Fleming, and secondly to Isabel de Ferrers, widow of Gilbert Basset (died 1241) and daughter of William de Ferrers, 5th Earl of Derby (1193–1254) by his wife Sibyl Marshal.

==== John de Mohun (1248–1279) ====
John de Mohun (1248–1279) (grandson), son of John de Mohun (died 1253), killed in Gascony, son of Reginald II, whom he predeceased.

==== John de Mohun, 1st Baron Mohun (1269–1330) ====
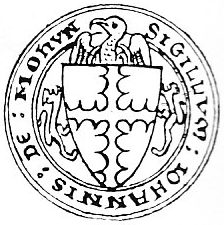
Seal of John de Mohun (1269–1330) appended to the Barons' Letter to the Pope, 1301. Arms: Or, a cross engrailed sable; Latin legend: Sigillum Johannis de Mohun ("seal of John de Mohun")

John de Mohun, 1st Baron Mohun (1269–1330) (son). He was the first of his family who had summons to attend Parliament, in 1299, thereby being created by writ a baron. He fought under Edward I (1272–1307) in the wars of Scotland and Gascony, and in 1300 was present at the Siege of Caerlaverock. He appears in the Roll of Caerlaverock, which blazons his armorials in ancient French verse as follows:

Jaune o crois noire engreelie
La portrait Johans de Mooun

(translated as: "Yellow (or), a cross engrailed black (sable)")
Together with many other barons and magnates he sealed the Barons' Letter to the Pope of 1301, in which he is called Johannes de Mohun, D(omi)n(u)s de Dunsterre ("John de Mohun, lord of Dunster"). He married Anne Tiptoft, daughter of Paine Tiptoft, by whom he had numerous issue including his eldest son and heir apparent John de Mohun (died after 1322), who predeceased his father, having married Christiana Segrave (died 1341), daughter of William Segrave, and having fought at the Battle of Boroughbridge in 1322 and died some time after in Scotland.

==== Sir John de Mohun, 2nd Baron Mohun (c. 1320 – 1375) ====
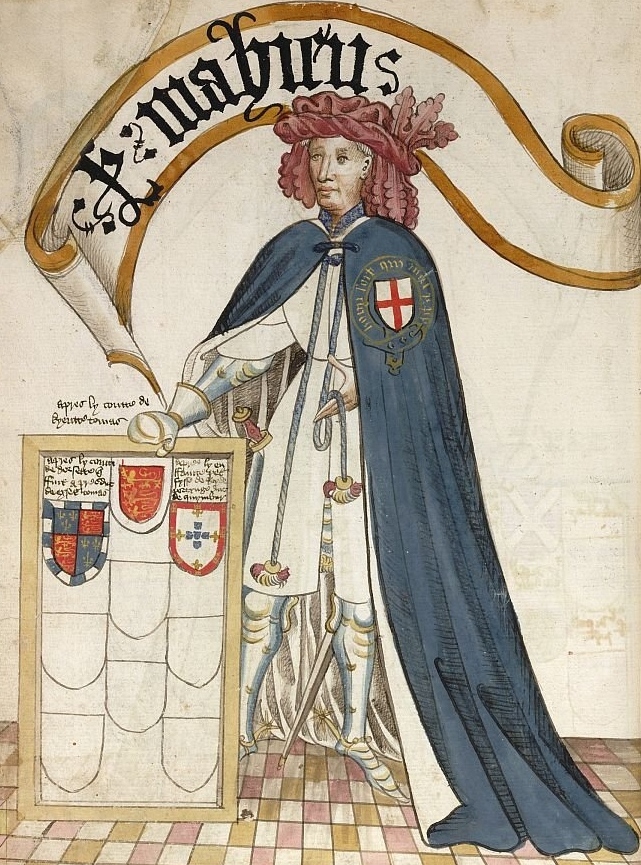
Sir John de Mohun, KG, (c. 1320 – 1375), from the Bruges Garter Book, 1430/1440

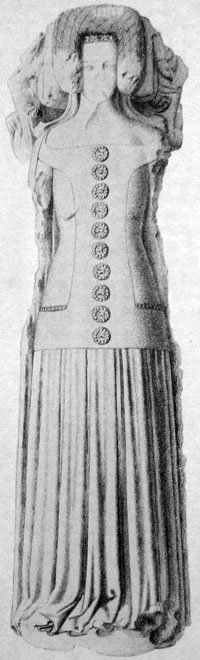
Effigy of Lady Joan Mohun (died 1404), wife of Sir John de Mohun (c. 1320 – 1375), Canterbury Cathedral, Crypt. (Note: On the monument is inscribed in ancient French: Pour dieu priez por l'ame Johane Burwaschs que fut Dame de Mohun ("For God pray for the soul of Joan de Burghersh who was Lady de Mohun"). She sold the reversion of Dunster Castle in 1376)

Sir John de Mohun, 2nd Baron Mohun, KG, (c. 1320 – 1375) (grandson), the last in the senior male line of Mohun of Dunster. He was the son of John de Mohun (died after 1322) (eldest son of John de Mohun), who predeceased his father, having fought at the Battle of Boroughbridge in 1322 and died some time after in Scotland. He was aged about 10 when he inherited the barony from his grandfather, and being a minor and a tenant-in-chief, became a ward of the King, who sold his wardship and marriage to Henry Burghersh (1292–1340), Bishop of Lincoln and Chancellor of England, who married him to his half-niece, Joan of Burghersh (died 1404), daughter of his half-brother Bartholomew de Burghersh, 1st Baron Burghersh (died 1355). According to Maxwell-Lyte (1909), Joan of Burghersh "was aiming at something more than a life interest in her husband's estates. She seems indeed to have obtained complete ascendency over him, either by the power of the purse or by superior force of character". He fought at the Battle of Crécy in 1346 with distinction and was one of the 25 founding knights of the Order of the Garter in 1348. With no expectation of male children, after having entered into several complicated settlements and resettlements of his estates, his wife Lady Mohun found herself in control of his estates, and despite the existence of her three daughters, "all of whom made brilliant matches", in 1374 she sold the reversion of the castle and manor of Dunster, the manors of Minehead and Kilton, and the hundred of Carhampton to Lady Elizabeth Luttrell (died 1395), wife of Sir Andrew Luttrell (died 1378/81), and a daughter of Hugh de Courtenay, 2nd Earl of Devon (1303–1377) and widow of Sir John de Vere, son of the Earl of Oxford. In the following year 1375 Lady Mohun's husband died, being the last in the male line of Mohun. In the following year 1376, Lady Mohun completed the transaction, namely that her trustees settled the castle of Dunster, the manors of Kilton, Minehead and Carhampton, and the hundred of Carhampton on Lady Mohun for her life, with remainder to Elizabeth Luttrell and her heirs.

Lady Elizabeth Luttrell never lived at Dunster, as she died in 1395 before Lady Mohun's life interest had expired. But Dunster Castle remained unoccupied after 1376 until Lady Mohun's death in 1404, as she lived the rest of her life at or near the royal court and stayed at Minehead on her rare visits to Somerset. She was buried in the crypt of Canterbury Cathedral, where her stone effigy survives.

=== Luttrell ===
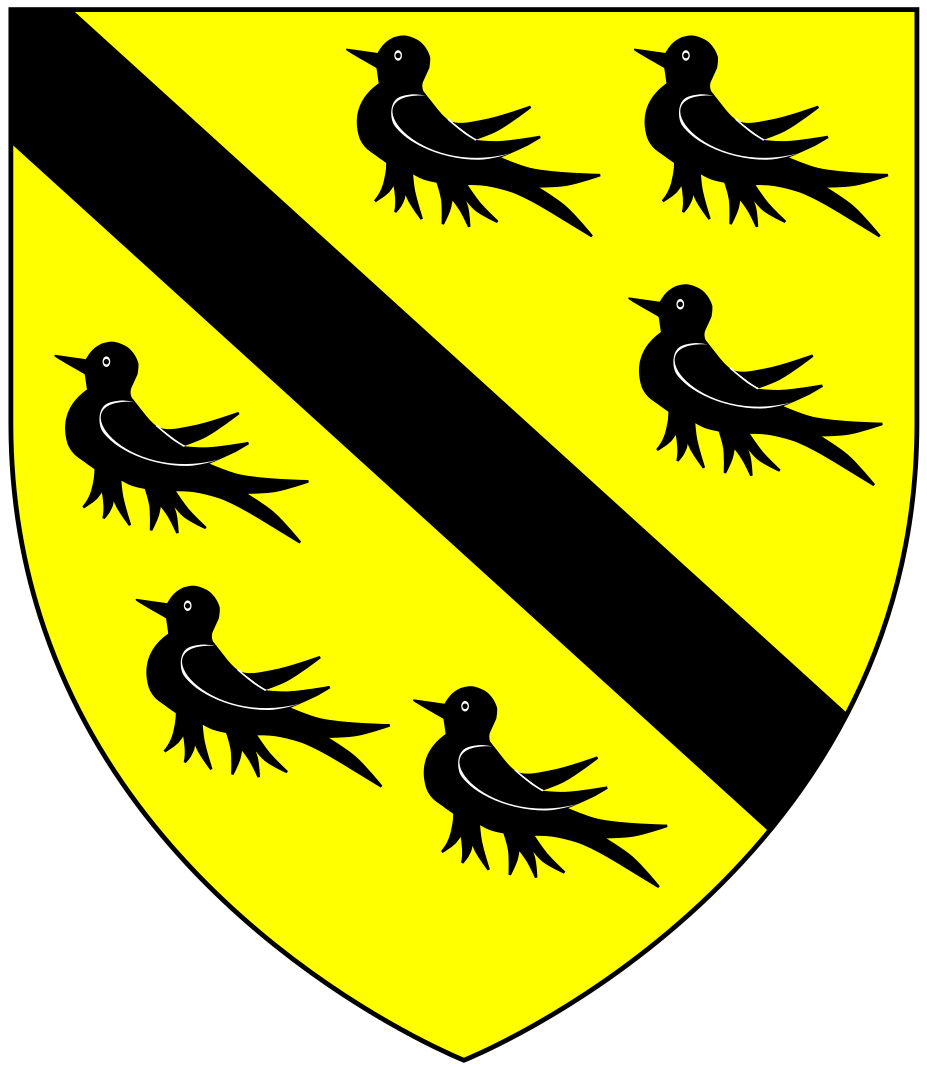
Arms of Luttrell: Or, a bend between six martlets sable

==== Lady Elizabeth Luttrell (died 1395) ====
Lady Elizabeth Luttrell (died 1395), wife of Sir Andrew Luttrell (died 1378/81), of Chilton, Devon, and a daughter of Hugh de Courtenay, 2nd Earl of Devon (1303–1377) of Tiverton Castle and widow of Sir John de Vere, son of the Earl of Oxford, who purchased the reversion of the Mohun estates in 1376 for 5,000 marks.

==== Sir Hugh Luttrell (c. 1364 – 1428) ====
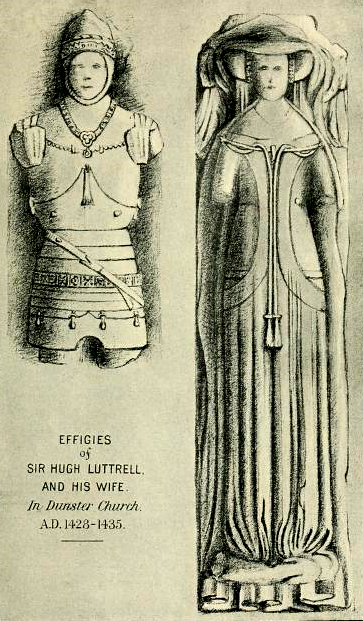
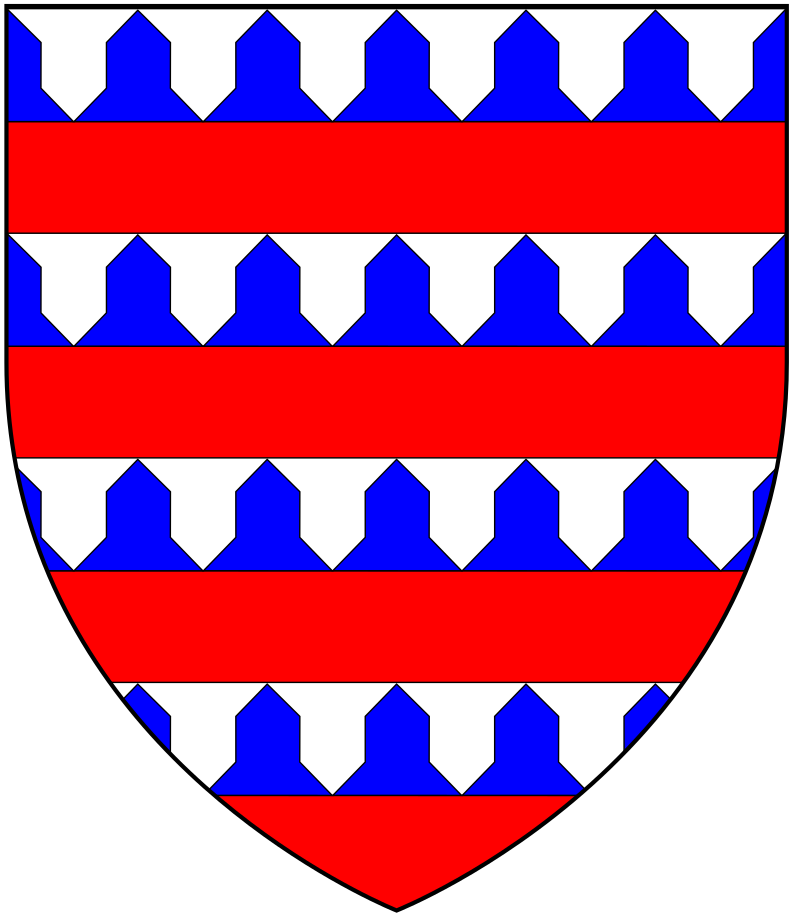
Left: Drawing circa 1909 of alabaster effigies in Dunster Church thought (by Maxwell-Lyte (1909)) to represent of Sir Hugh Luttrell (c. 1364 – 1428) of Dunster Castle and his wife Catherine Beaumont (died 1435). Right: Arms of Beaumont of Shirwell: Barry of six vair and gules

Sir Hugh Luttrell (c. 1364 – 1428) (son of Sir Andrew Luttrell by his wife Lady Elizabeth Courtenay). He married Catherine Beaumont (died 1435), daughter of Sir John Beaumont (died 1379/80) of Shirwell and Saunton in North Devon, MP for Devon 1376-80, a substantial landowner in Devon, by his second wife Joan Crawthorne, granddaughter and heiress of Sir Robert Stockey, MP in 1318, of Crawthorne and Cranstone. Alabaster effigies survive in Dunster Church of himself and his wife, badly mutilated. The arms of Beaumont (Barry of six vair and gules) appear in Dunster Church and on the Luttrell Table Carpet, c.1520, now in the collection of the Burrell Collection in Glasgow (see below).

==== John Luttrell (c. 1394 – 1430) ====
John Luttrell (c. 1394 – 1430) (son), who in about 1422 married Margaret Tuchet (died 1438), daughter of John Tuchet, 4th Baron Audley (1371–1408). He was buried probably at Bruton Priory.

==== Sir James Luttrell (1426/7-1461) ====
Sir James Luttrell (1426/7-1461)(son) He was a minor aged 3 or 4 at his father's death and as a tenant-in-chief became a ward of the king, who sold the wardship of his lands to John Stafford, Bishop of Bath and Wells, and the wardship and marriage of his person to Humphrey Stafford, 6th Earl of Stafford (1402–1460) (created Duke of Buckingham in 1444), who re-sold to Sir Philip Courtenay (1404–1463) of Powderham, Devon, great-grandson of Hugh Courtenay, 2nd Earl of Devon (died 1377), who in 1450 in the chapel at Powderham Castle married him off to his daughter Elizabeth Courtenay (died 1493), (the couple were cousins, both descended from Hugh Courtenay, 2nd Earl of Devon (died 1377)) sister of Peter Courtenay (died 1492) Bishop of Exeter and of Sir Philip Courtenay (b.1445) of Molland, sometime MP and Sheriff of Devon in 1471. Elizabeth Courtenay survived her husband and remarried twice:

- Firstly to Sir Humphrey Audley (alias Touchet) (c. 1434 – 1471), a younger son of James Tuchet, 5th Baron Audley, 2nd Baron Tuchet (c. 1398 – 1459) by his second wife Eleanor de Holland. By Sir Humphrey Audley she had children including Philipa Audley, wife of Richard Hadley of Withycombe in Somerset (see below).
- Secondly to Thomas Malett of Enmore in Somerset.

Sir James Luttrell died fighting for the Lancastrian cause at the Battle of St Albans in 1461. He was posthumously attainted for high treason and his lands were forfeited to the crown. In 1463 his lands were granted to William Herbert, 1st Baron Herbert (1423–1469), of Raglan, created in 1468 Earl of Pembroke.

=== Herbert ===
- William Herbert, 1st Earl of Pembroke (died 1469)
- William Herbert, 2nd Earl of Pembroke, 1st earl of Huntingdon (son), who enjoyed the former Luttrell estates until the end of the reign of King Richard III (1483–1485)

=== Luttrell (estates restored) ===
==== Sir Hugh Luttrell (died 1521) ====
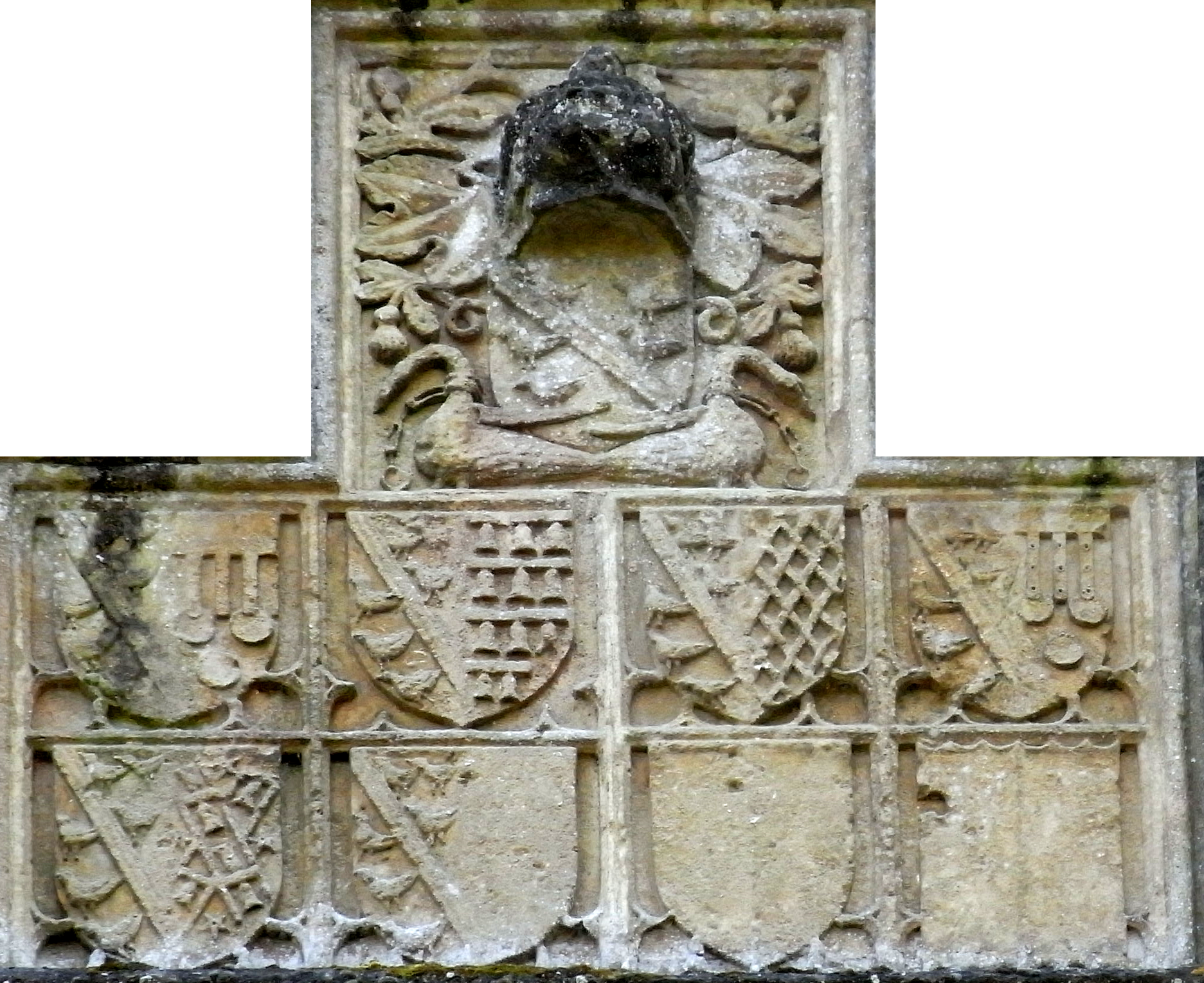
Sculpted stone heraldic shields on western arch of the Gatehouse to Dunster Castle in Somerset, erected by Sir Hugh Luttrell (died 1521). (Note: The 8 shields in the panel show the arms of Luttrell impaling: (from top row left to right): Courtenay of Tiverton, Beaumont (of Shirwell, Devon), Audley, Courtenay of Powderham (the label of three points differenced by three plates on each label) and Hill (his own wife), all wives of Luttrells. The 6th shield was intended to be completed by the sculpting of the arms of his son's wife, which was never effected. Similarly the two completely blank shields intended for use by his grandson and great-grandson were never used. The heraldic achievement on top shows the Luttrell arms in a shield supported from underneath by two Bohun Swans (an emblem inherited from the Courtenays) chained and collared with a coronet, with the Luttrell canting crest of a loutre (otter) above)

Sir Hugh Luttrell (died 1521), son of Sir James Luttrell (1426/7-1461). He joined Henry Tudor, Earl of Richmond on his landing in Wales in 1485, following his return from exile in France, and fought for him at the Battle of Bosworth in 1485. Following Richmond's accession to the throne as King Henry VII (1485–1509), he obtained the reward from that king of a reversal of his father's attainder and received restoration of his lands from the Herberts, who had never lived at Dunster, having been long seated in Wales. He was instrumental in quelling the rebellion in Devon. In 1487 on the coronation of the queen he was appointed K.B. He was Sheriff of Somerset and Dorset in 1488. He erected the surviving sculpted stone heraldic panel above the western arch of the Gatehouse to Dunster Castle, showing on six shields (a further two blank) the arms of Luttrell, Beaumont, Audley, Courtenay of Powderham and Hill. His Easter Sepulchre monument, erected post 1538 as ordered in the will of his son Sir Andrew, survives standing against the north wall of the chancel of St Mary's Church, East Quantoxhead, and shows on its base three sculpted heraldic escutcheons, the left-hand one of Luttrell alone, the central one of Luttrell impaling Hill and the right-hand one of Luttrell impaling Wyndham. On top is his heraldic achievement showing an escutcheon with the Luttrell arms with a strap and buckle above connecting it to the helm above. The supporters are two Bohun swans, wings elevated, each chained and collared with a crown. These emphasise descent from the de Bohun family via Elizabeth Courtenay (d 1395), the wife of Sir Andrew Luttrell. On top of the helm is the canting Luttrell crest of a loutre (otter). He married twice:

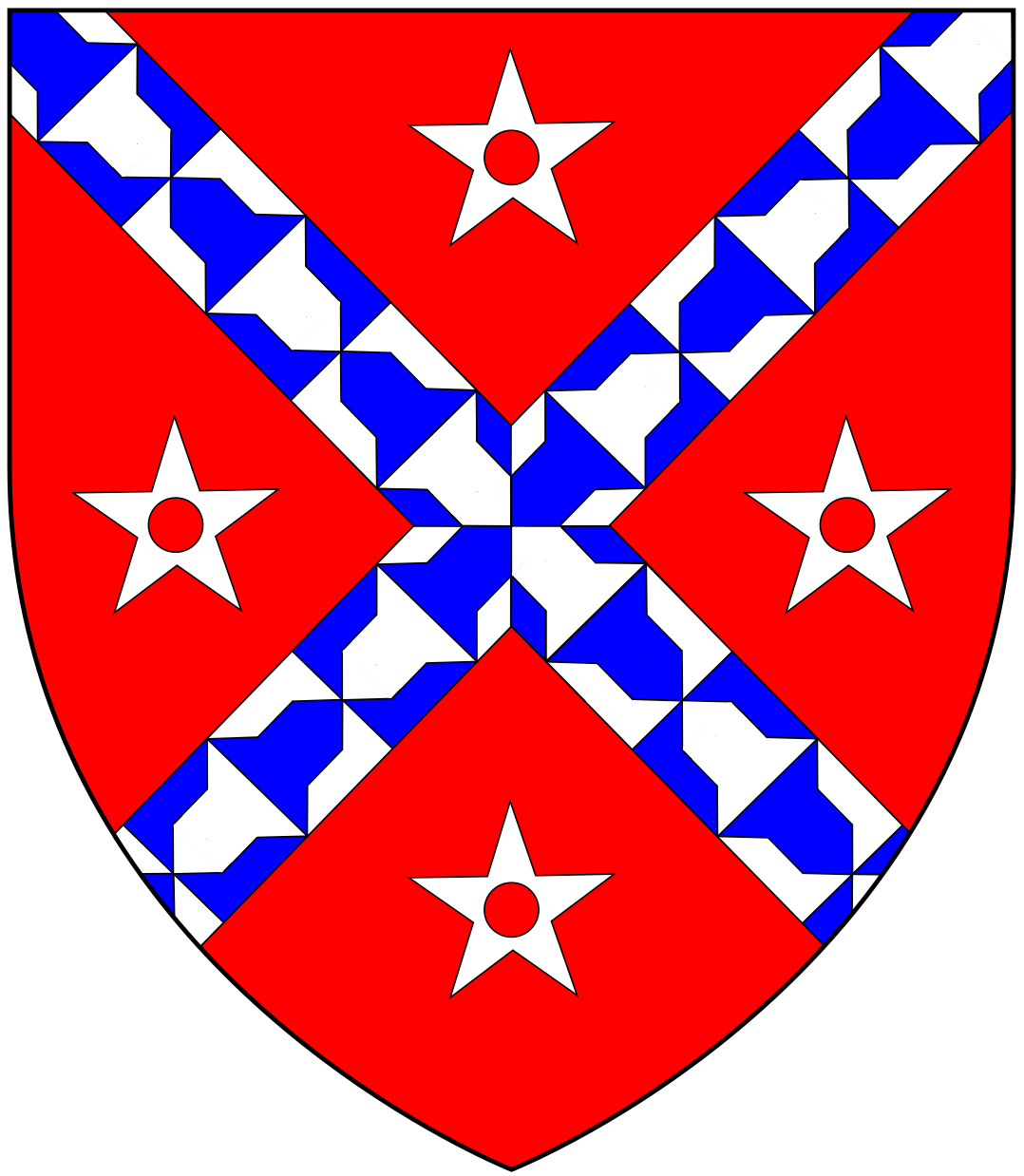
Arms of Hill of Houndstone: Gules, a saltire vair between four mullets pierced argent

- Firstly to Margaret Hill, daughter of Robert Hill (died 1493) of Houndstone, near Yeovil, Somerset, by his wife Alice Stourton, widow of William Daubeney (1424-1460/1) of South Ingleby in Lincolnshire and South Petherton and Barrington Court in Somerset, MP for Bedfordshire 1448/9 and Sheriff of Cornwall 1452/3, the youngest of the three daughters and co-heiresses (by his 3rd wife Katherine Payne) of John Stourton (died 1438) of Preston Plucknett in Somerset, 7 times MP for Somerset, in 1419, 1420, December 1421, 1423, 1426, 1429 and 1435. Margaret Hill was thus the uterine half-sister (Note: "Sister to Lord Dawbeney" per Heraldic Visitation of Devon, 1620 (Vivian, p.537). They shared a mother in common, namely Alice Stourton (born 1432), 3rd daughter and co-heiress of John Stourton of Preston Plucknett, Somerset who on the death of her 1st husband William Daubeney (1424–1461) remarried to Robert Hill (died 1493) of Houndston, Somerset and Talaton, Devon.) to Giles Daubeney, 1st Baron Daubeney (1451–1508) (one of the principal supporters of the Earl of Richmond, later King Henry VII). Robert Hill was buried in Dunster Church, in which used to exist his monument displaying the arms of Hill (Gules, a saltire vair between four mullets pierced argent) (Note: The arms of Hill are shown impaled by Luttrell sculpted on the base of Sir Hugh Luttrell's Easter Sepulchre monument in east Quantoxhead Church, with roses in place of mullets)) impaling Stourton, the family of his wife Alice Stourton (born 1432), the mother of Margaret Hill and of Lord Daubeney. One of Margaret Hill's aunts was Cecily Stourton, who married John Hill (died 1434), the son of Robert Hill (c. 1361 – 1423), four times MP for Somerset, of Spaxton in Somerset, who used the same arms as Hill of Houndstone, (Note: Robert Hill (c. 1361 – 1423) was the son of Sir John Hill, MP, Justice of the King's Bench, of Hill's Court, Exeter, whose arms are given in Pole, p.487) and who in 1402-4 had been the steward of the Dunster Castle estates of Joan, Lady Mohun, after whose death he retained close connections with the new lord of Dunster Sir Hugh Luttrell (died 1428), his co-MP for Somerset in 1414 and 1415, of whose will he was an executor. By his first wife Sir Hugh Luttrell had children including two sons: his eldest son and heir Sir Andrew Luttrell (1484–1538), of Dunster Castle, and John Luttrell, a younger son who founded the Luttrell family of Kentisbury and Spaxton in Somerset
- Secondly to Walthean Yard, daughter of a member of the Yard family of Exeter, and widow of Walter Yorke and John Drewe.

==== Sir Andrew Luttrell (1484–1538) ====
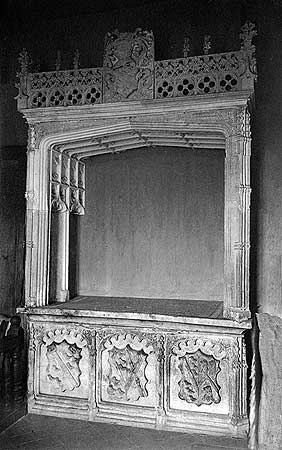
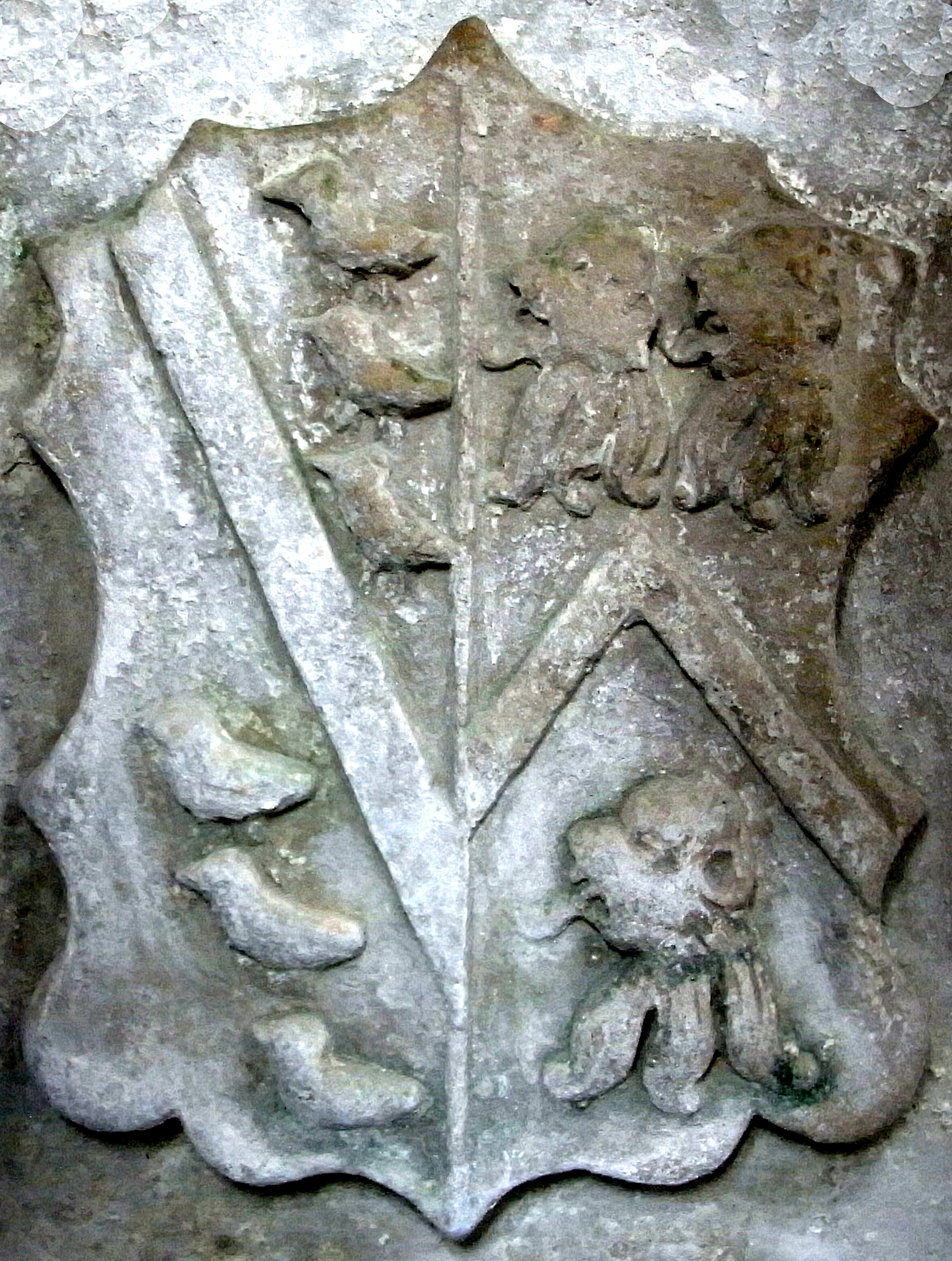
Left: Easter Sepulchre monument post 1538 erected by order of the will of Sir Andrew Luttrell (1484–1538). It commemorates himself and his father Hugh Luttrell (died 1522). North wall of chancel, St Mary's Church, East Quantoxhead. Right: Arms of Luttrell impaling Azure, a chevron between three lion's heads erased or (Wyndham). Detail from base of monument

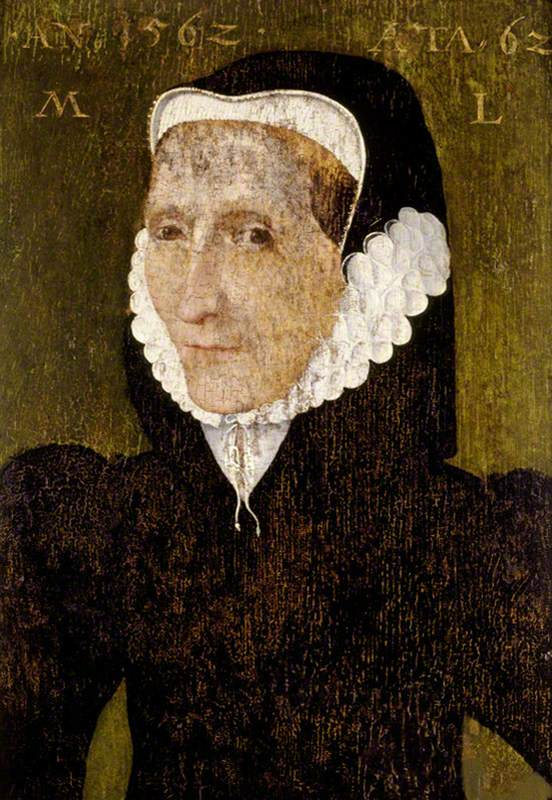
1562 portrait of Margaret Luttrell (1500–1580) aged 62, collection of National Trust, Dunster Castle

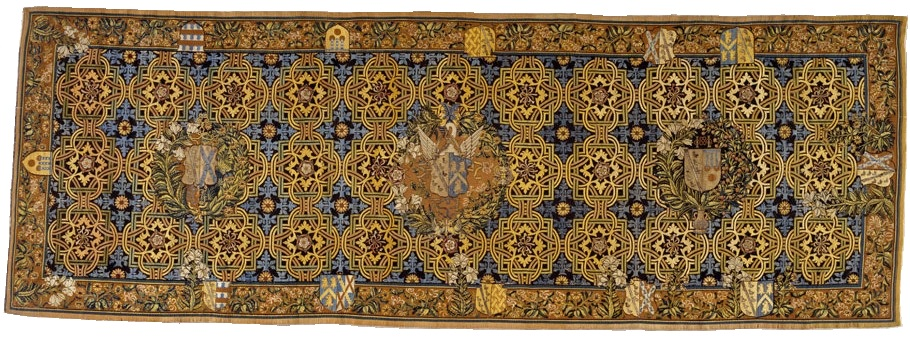
The Luttrell Table Carpet, circa 1520, believed to have been commissioned to record the wedding of Sir Andrew Luttrell and Margaret Wyndham. (Note: In the centre are the arms of Luttrell impaling Wyndham with a Bohun swan above. Around the edge are shields recording previous matches of the Luttrells. Burrell Collection, Glasgow)

Sir Andrew Luttrell (1484–1538), of Dunster, eldest son by his father's first wife Margaret Hill. He was Sheriff of Somerset and Dorset in 1528. His monument exists in East Quantoxhead Church. In 1514 he married Margaret Wyndham (died 1580), a daughter of Sir Thomas Wyndham (died 1521) of Felbrigg Hall in Norfolk. Andrew was at that date a minor, and the marriage was dictated by the fathers of both parties, as a clause in the marriage settlement dated 31 March 1514 reveals:

"Andrew Luttrell ... shall marry and take to his wife Margaret...or any other of the daughters of the said Sir Thomas such as the said Andrew shall best like, before the Wednesday next after Low Sunday"

Should Andrew Luttrell have died before the intended marriage, his younger brother John was contracted by the marriage settlement to take his place as a husband to one of the Wyndham daughters. Margaret's mother was her father's first wife Eleanor Scrope, daughter and heiress of Richard Scrope of Upsall Castle, Yorkshire. Margaret's brother was Sir John Wyndham (died c. 1580), who on visiting his sister at Dunster met and later married Elizabeth Sydenham (d.1/1/1571), daughter and co-heiress of Sir John Sydenham of nearby Orchard Sydenham, and became the ancestor of the prominent and widespread Wyndham family of Orchard Wyndham, the senior branch of which later became Earls of Egremont. Orchard Wyndham is today still owned and occupied by the Wyndham family. The very large "Luttrell Table Carpet" (5.5m by 1.9m) in the Burrell Collection in Glasgow showing in its centre the arms of Luttrell impaling Wyndham with other earlier matches of the Luttrells in the border, was probably made to celebrate the wedding, or possibly made after his death as a memorial. Lady Luttrell, who was a "powerful personage" due to her large Wyndham dowry, purchased Dunster Priory following the Dissolution of the Monasteries, which thenceforth descended with the castle. By his wife Margaret Wyndham he had children including three sons:

- Sir John Luttrell (died 1551), eldest son and heir, a soldier who died with no sons, when Dunster Castle passed to his next younger brother:
- Thomas Luttrell (died 1571), of Dunster Castle, second son
- Nicholas Luttrell (died 1592), third son, of Haniburie, Somerset, whose son Andrew Luttrell (died 1625) founded the Luttrell families of Hartland Abbey and Saunton (inherited by John Luttrell (died 1430) from his mother Catherine Beaumont) in Devon.

==== Sir John Luttrell (died 1551) ====
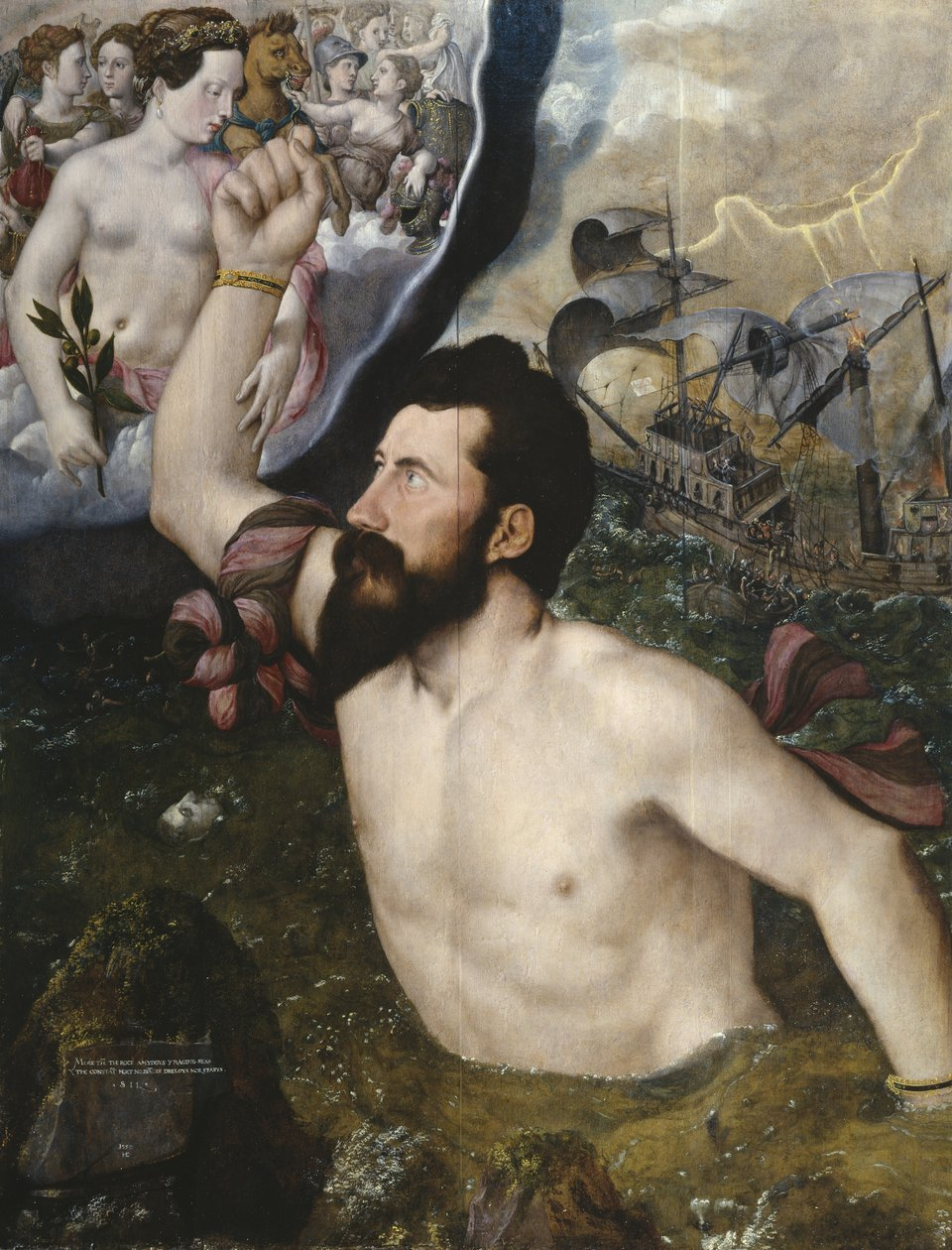
Allegorical portrait of Sir John Luttrell (died 1551), of Dunster, by Hans Eworth, 1550. Courtauld Institute, London. A nearly contemporary copy exists at Dunster Castle

Sir John Luttrell (died 1551), of Dunster Castle, eldest son and heir. He was one of the principal commanders in the Scottish war under the earl of Hertford. In 1545 he was knighted after the capture of Leith. He was taken prisoner by the Scots in 1550 at Broughty Craig and was ransomed for £400. He married Mary Ryce, daughter of Sir Griffith Ryce, by whom he had no sons, only three daughters, Catherine, Dorothy and Mary, co-heiresses to 1/3 in total of his estate, the remaining 2/3rds going by entail to his younger brother Thomas Luttrell (died 1571). Mary survived him and remarried to James Godolphin of Cornwall.

==== Thomas Luttrell (died 1571) ====
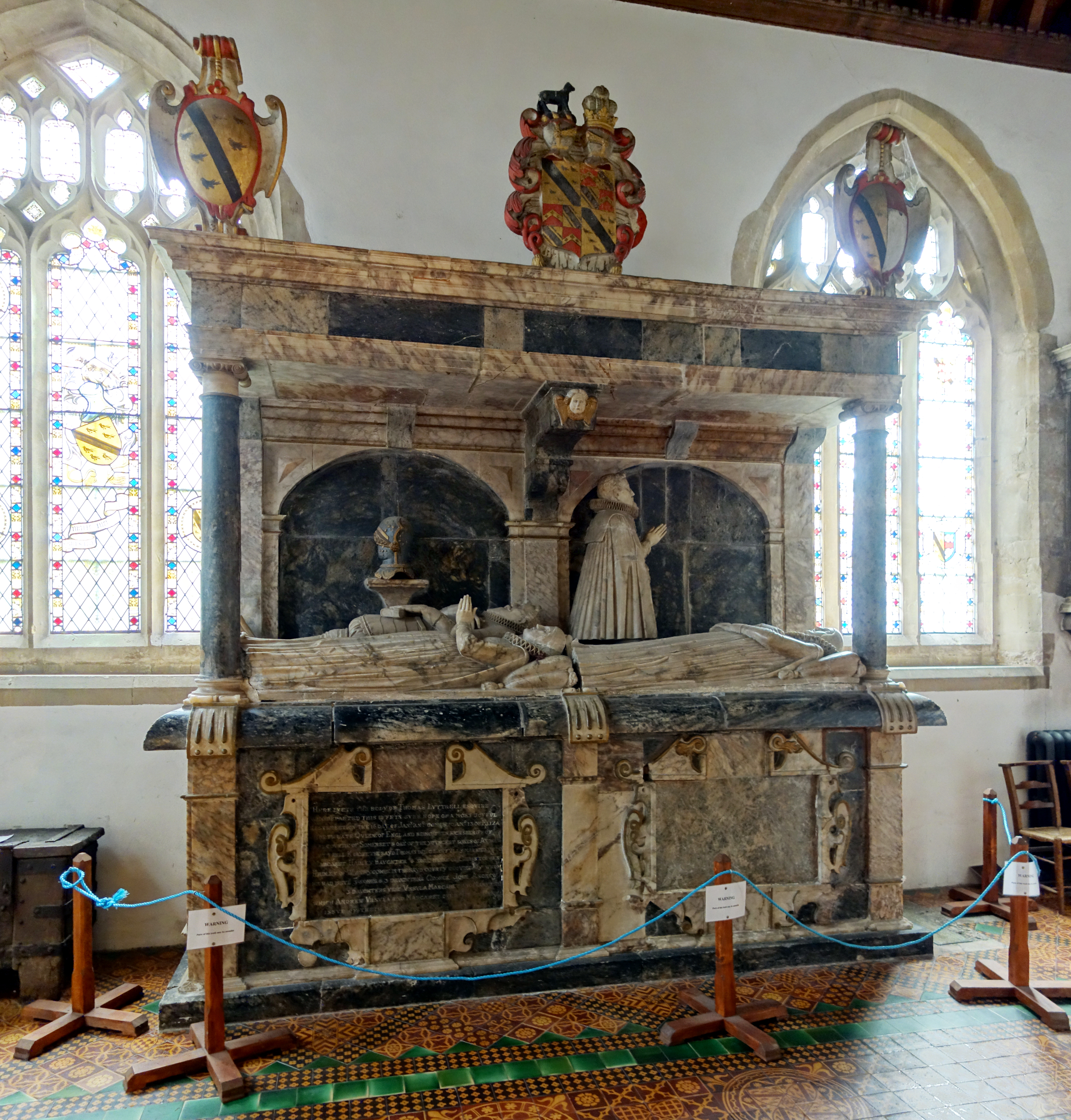
Monument in Dunster Church to Thomas Luttrell (died 1571) of Dunster Castle and his wife, both recumbent effigies (left). (Note: To the right are shown Thomas's son George Luttrell (c. 1560 – 1629) kneeling next to the recumbent effigy of his first wife, with his arms above centre quartering Hadley. Erected by George's son Thomas Luttrell (died 1644), whose arms impaling Popham are shown at top right)

Thomas Luttrell (died 1571) of Dunster Castle (younger brother). In 1563 he was MP for the newly created Luttrell Pocket Borough of Minehead, two miles north-east of Dunster Castle. He sold the Devon and Somerset estates, excepting Dunster Castle, apparently to meet debts. These were however "amply replaced" by the large estate inherited from his wife (and distant relative) Margaret Hadley, daughter and eventual sole heiress of Christopher Hadley (1517–1540), lord of the manor of Withycombe Hadley in Somerset. (Note: Manor of Withycombe had been inherited from the Durborough family Victoria County History, Withycombe Manors and Estates) The former manor house of the Hadleys survives as Court Place in the village of Withycombe. Thomas Luttrell and Margaret Hadley were distantly related spiritually as well as by blood, as Margaret was the god-daughter of Thomas's mother, making them in the eyes of the church spiritually related as brother and sister; and both were descended from Elizabeth Courtenay (died 1493), daughter of Sir Philip Courtenay (1404–1463) of Powderham. Margaret's great-grandfather Richard Hadley had married Philippa Audley, daughter of Sir Humphrey Audley (brother of Lord Audley) by his wife Elizabeth Courtenay (died 1493), who was the widow of Sir James Luttrell (died 1461), the great-grandfather of Thomas Luttrell. In consequence of this consanguinity in 1557 a papal bull was procured from Pope Paul V to sanction the marriage. The legal difficulties encountered by the marriage are related by Maxwell-Lyte as follows:

"The date and the exact circumstances of the marriage are not recorded, but we may fairly suppose it to have taken place in the reign of Edward the Sixth (1547–1553), when ecclesiastical discipline was somewhat lax. The validity of it was evidently challenged in the stricter reign of Philip and Mary (1553–1558), for the parties found it desirable to have recourse to Rome. A solemn document issued by the Cardinal of St. Angelo, Papal Penitentiary, at St. Peter's, on the 28th of November 1558, recites that Thomas Luttrell Esquire and Margaret Hadley had by their petition confessed that they had, without proper dispensation, been actually married, although related in the third and third, and in the third and fourth degrees of kindred, and although spiritually related, the mother of Thomas having stood godmother to Margaret at her baptism or confirmation. The language of the document leaves it doubtful whether the marriage had been solemnized in public and whether any issue had been actually born. Its effect, however, was to release the parties from the excommunication that they had incurred on condition of a fresh marriage "in the face of the church", and to legitimate any previous offspring. ... The dispensation, having been issued a few days after the accession of Elizabeth, was probably one of the very latest documents of the sort that was despatched before the final breach between England and Rome, and the sequel is perhaps the most curious part of the story. For nearly two years no further action was taken in the matter, but on the 27th of August 1560, Thomas Luttrell was solemnly married in the church of East Quantockshead, his bride being described in the register as "Mrs (i.e. "Mistress") Margaret Hadley". Their eldest son, George Luttrell, was born in the following month. In the inscription on the monument which he set up in memory of his parents, some sixty years later, it is expressly stated that they were 'lawfully married'".

It was probably the last instance in England of the remarriage of two persons who had been divorced on the score of a spiritual relationship.

==== George Luttrell (died 1629) ====
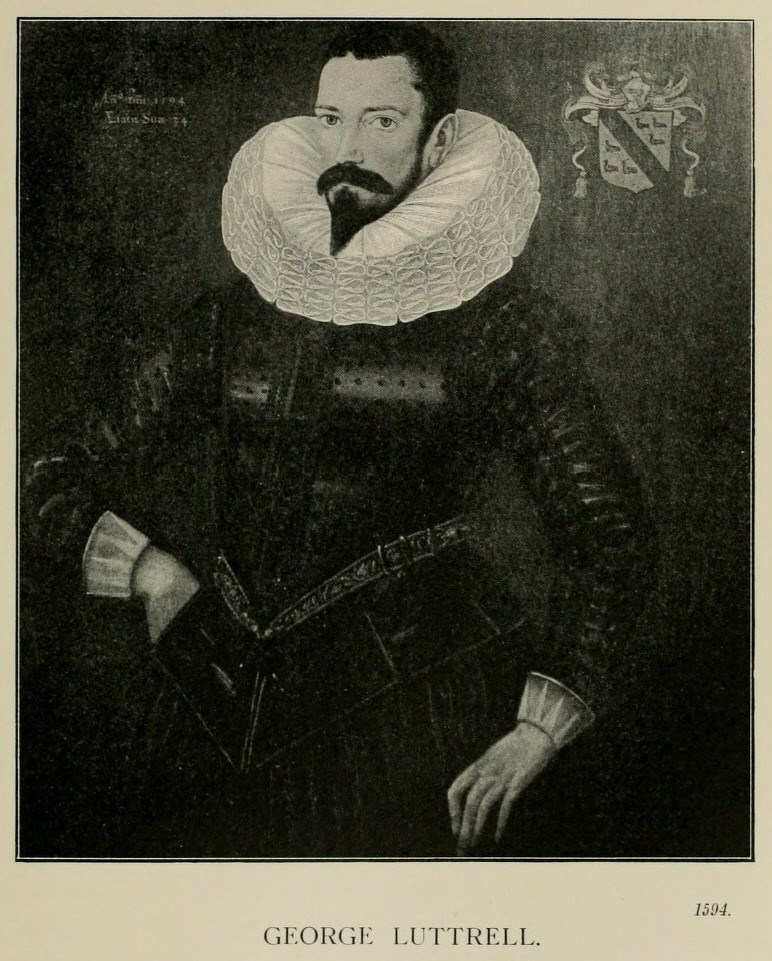
George Luttrell (1560-1629)

George Luttrell (died 1629), of Dunster Castle, eldest son and heir. He was twice Member of Parliament for Minehead, in 1572 and 1584. He was twice Sheriff of Somerset, in 1593 and 1609 and built the pier in Minehead harbour. He embarked on a major rebuilding of the Castle, to the designs of the Somerset architect William Arnold (fl.1595–1637), which produced a Jacobean mansion, much of which exists today, having survived the Victorian remodelling. He married twice:

- Firstly to Joan Stucley, daughter of Hugh Stucley of Marsh (now Marshwood, Blue Anchor), near Dunster, Somerset. It is unclear what relationship if any his wife had to the prominent Stucley family of Affeton, Devon, later Stucley Baronets.
- Secondly to Sylvestra Cappers.

==== Thomas Luttrell (1583–1644) ====
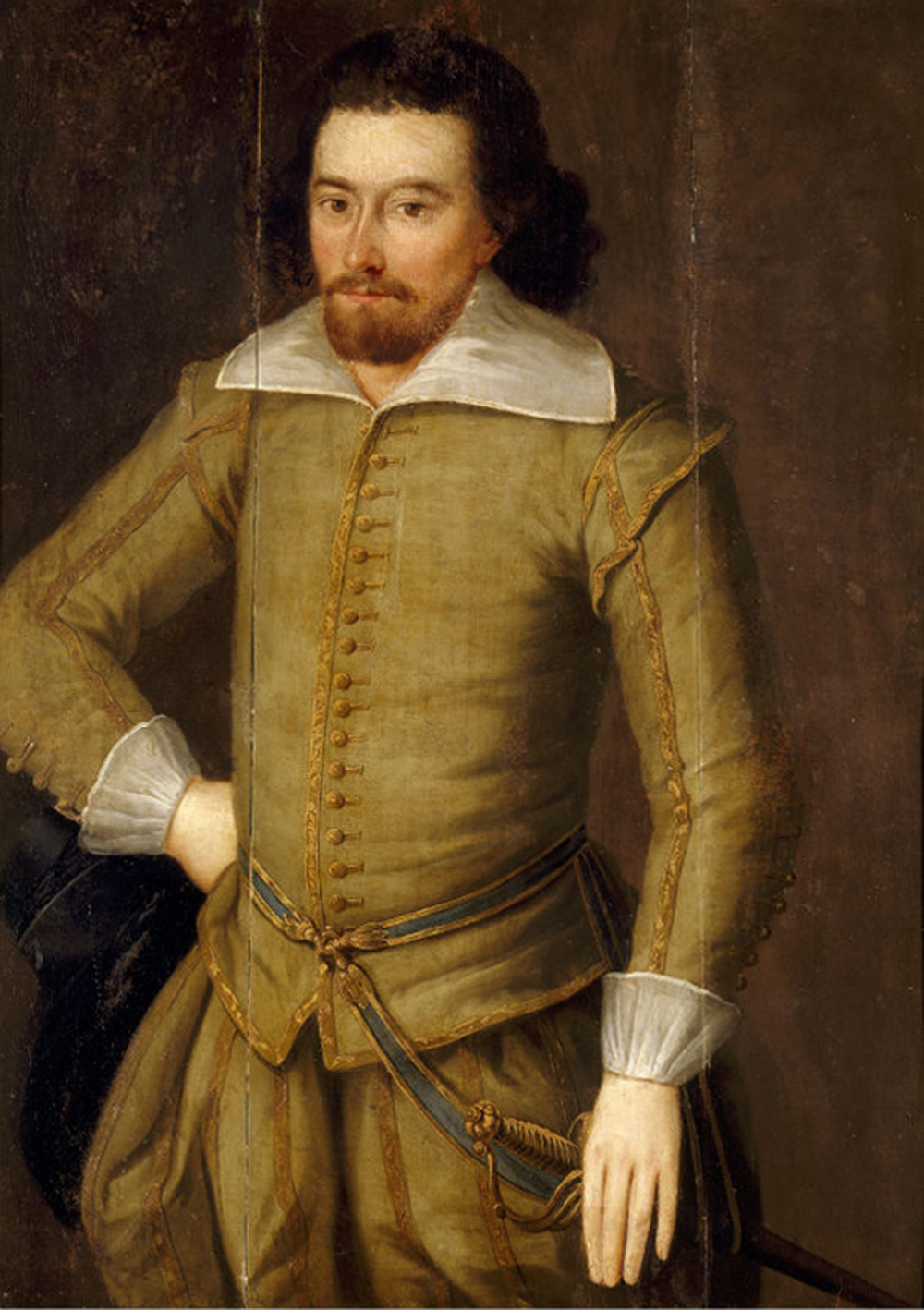
Thomas Luttrell (1584–1644) of Dunster Castle, British (English) School, National Trust, Dunster Castle collection. Donated in 1981 by Lieutenant-Colonel Geoffrey Walter Fownes Luttrell (1919–2007)

Thomas Luttrell (1583–1644), son by his father's first wife Joan Stucley, MP for Minehead 1625, Sheriff of Somerset 1631. He attended Lincoln College, Oxford (BA 1599) and entered Lincoln's Inn in 1604. In his religious sympathies he was a Puritan and during the Civil War he garrisoned Dunster Castle against the king. He was eventually forced to surrender it to the Marquess of Hertford. In 1621 he married Jane Popham (died 1668), daughter of Sir Francis Popham (c. 1573 – 1644), MP, of Wellington, Somerset and Littlecote, Wiltshire, only son of Sir John Popham(1531–1607), Speaker of the House of Commons, Attorney General and Lord Chief Justice of England. The arms of Popham (Argent, on a chief gules two stag's heads cabossed or) are displayed on the top right of the monument in Dunster Church to his grandfather Thomas Luttrell (died 1571). He built a new harbour at Minehead at his own expense. He had one daughter and four sons, including George Luttrell (died 1655), his eldest son and heir, Francis Luttrell (1628–1666), 2nd son and heir to his brother, and Alexander Luttrell, a younger son whom for the Long Parliament he successfully nominated, together with his father-in-law Sir Francis Popham, as MP's for the Luttrell pocket borough of Minehead. His portrait survives at Dunster Castle.

==== George Luttrell (died 1655) ====
George Luttrell (died 1655), eldest son and heir, Sheriff of Somerset in 1652. Unlike his father he was a Royalist during the Civil War. Dunster Castle was besieged by the Parliamentarians 1645–46 and was surrendered by his cousin and near neighbour Colonel Francis Wyndham of Orchard Wyndham. It was used as a Parliamentary garrison for five years, and in 1650, although the house was spared, the defensive curtain wall was demolished on the order of Oliver Cromwell. In 1651 the Castle was restored to George Luttrell in return for recognizances. He married twice, but produced no children:

- Firstly to Elizabeth Prideaux, a daughter of Sir Nicholas Prideaux (1550–1627) of Soldon, Holsworthy, Devon, MP for Camelford, Cornwall in 1570 and Sheriff of Cornwall in 1605, builder of Prideaux Place in Cornwall, and elder brother of Sir Edmund Prideaux, 1st Baronet (died 1628) of Netherton, Farway, Devon. Without children.
- Secondly in 1652, three years before his death, he married his first wife's 20-year-old great-niece, Honora Fortescue (born 1632), a daughter of John Fortescue (1597–1655) of Buckland Filleigh, Devon, by his wife Thomasine Prideaux, daughter of Humphrey Prideaux of Soldon. Without children.

==== Francis Luttrell (1628–1666) ====
Francis Luttrell (1628–1666), younger brother, MP for Somerset (1656) and twice MP for Minehead (1660 and 1661–1666). On 8 October 1655 he married Lucy Symonds, daughter of Thomas Symonds of Whittlesford, Cambridgeshire, and granddaughter of John Pym, MP, one of the Five Members whose attempted arrest by King Charles I in the House of Commons in 1642 sparked the Civil War. By his wife he had three sons:

- Thomas Luttrell (died 1670), eldest son and heir, who died a minor, without children.
- Col. Francis Luttrell (1659–1690), of Dunster Castle, 2nd son and heir to his elder brother. He matriculated at Christ Church, Oxford in 1676 and was MP for Minehead 1679–90. He married Mary Tregonwell (died 1704), only daughter and sole heiress of John Tregonwell of Milton Abbey, by whom he had two daughters, Mary and Frances, and a son and heir Tregonwell Luttrell (1683–1703), of Dunster Castle, who died without children.
- Col. Alexander Luttrell (1663–1711), youngest son, of Dunster Castle, who was heir to his nephew Tregonwell Luttrell (1683–1703), of Dunster Castle, and whose own son Alexander Luttrell (1705–1737) of Dunster Castle was the last in the male line of the Luttrell family, whose only daughter and sole heiress Margaret Luttrell (1726–1766) married Henry Fownes (c. 1722 – 1780), who adopted the name and arms of Luttrell.

==== Thomas Luttrell (died 1670) ====
Thomas Luttrell (died 1670), eldest son and heir, who died a minor, without children.

==== Col. Francis Luttrell (1659–1690) ====
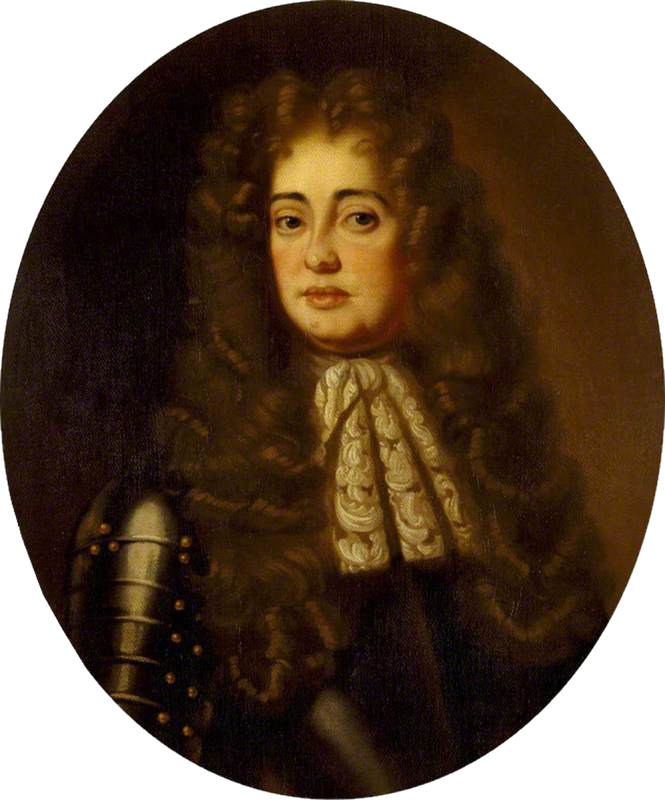
Colonel Francis Luttrell

Col. Francis Luttrell (1659–1690), younger brother. He matriculated at Christ Church, Oxford in 1676 and was MP for Minehead 1679–90. He married a wealthy heiress, Mary Tregonwell (died 1704), only daughter and sole heiress of John Tregonwell of Milton Abbey, Dorset, and the couple made many extravagant alterations to the Castle, including the addition of the carved wooden staircase and a new dining-room with elaborate plasterwork ceilings. An inventory dated 1690 survives, which lists the sumptuous fittings and furnishings at that date. By his wife Mary Tregonwell he had two daughters, Mary and Frances, and a son and heir Tregonwell Luttrell (1683–1703), of Dunster Castle, who died without children.

==== Tregonwell Luttrell (1683–1703) ====
Tregonwell Luttrell (1683–1703), son, who died without children.

==== Col. Alexander Luttrell (1663–1711) ====
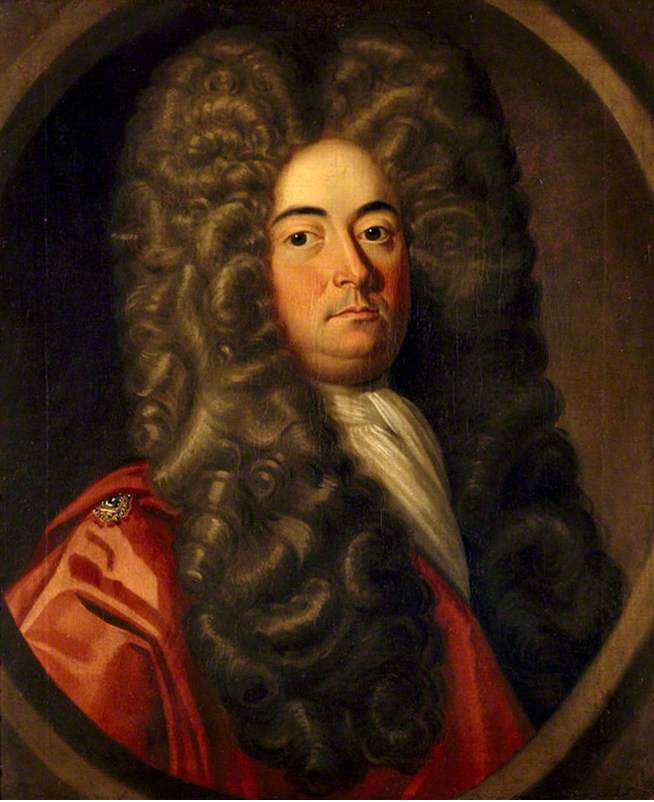
Alexander Luttrell (1663–1711)

Col. Alexander Luttrell (1663–1711), uncle, youngest son of Francis Luttrell (1628–1666) of Dunster Castle. He matriculated at Christ Church, Oxford in 1677. He fought in Flanders and was Colonel of the Royal Regiment of Marines. He was MP for Minehead 1690–1705. He married Dorothy Yard (1667–1723), daughter of Edward Yarde (1638–1703) of Churston Ferrers, Devon, MP for Ashburton in 1685. On his death his widow took on the management of the Dunster Castle estate and cleared the debts incurred by her husband's extravagant elder brother Col. Francis Luttrell and his wife Mary Tregonwell. She laid out new gardens. In 1720 she created the New Way, a less-steep approach to the castle and added a chapel to the south front. Shortly before her death she levelled the top of the ancient castle mound formerly occupied by the Norman keep, making thereon a bowling green with brick-built summerhouse.

==== Alexander Luttrell (1705–1737) ====
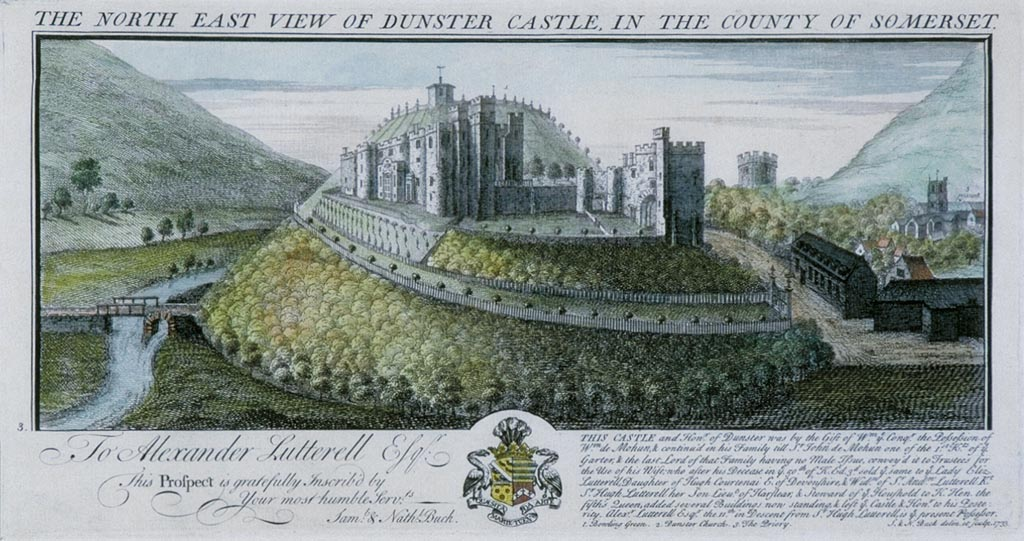
North East View of Dunster Castle, 1733 depiction by Samuel and Nathaniel Buck. The top of the mound on which stood the keep was levelled by Dorothy Luttrell (died 1723) to form a bowling green

Alexander Luttrell (1705–1737), son, of Dunster Castle, MP for Minehead (1727–1737), was the last in the male line of the Luttrell family. He matriculated at Christ Church, Oxford in 1722, where he was sent with his younger brother Francis Luttrell (1709–1732) of Venn, Somerset. In 1726 he married Margaret Trevelyan, daughter of Sir John Trevelyan, 2nd Baronet of Nettlecombe, Somerset, by whom he had a daughter and sole heiress Margaret Luttrell (1726–1766), who married Henry Fownes (c. 1722 – 1780), who under his father-in-law's will inherited the Luttrell estates including Dunster Castle, with the proviso that he should adopt the surname and arms of Luttrell.

=== Fownes (Luttrell) ===
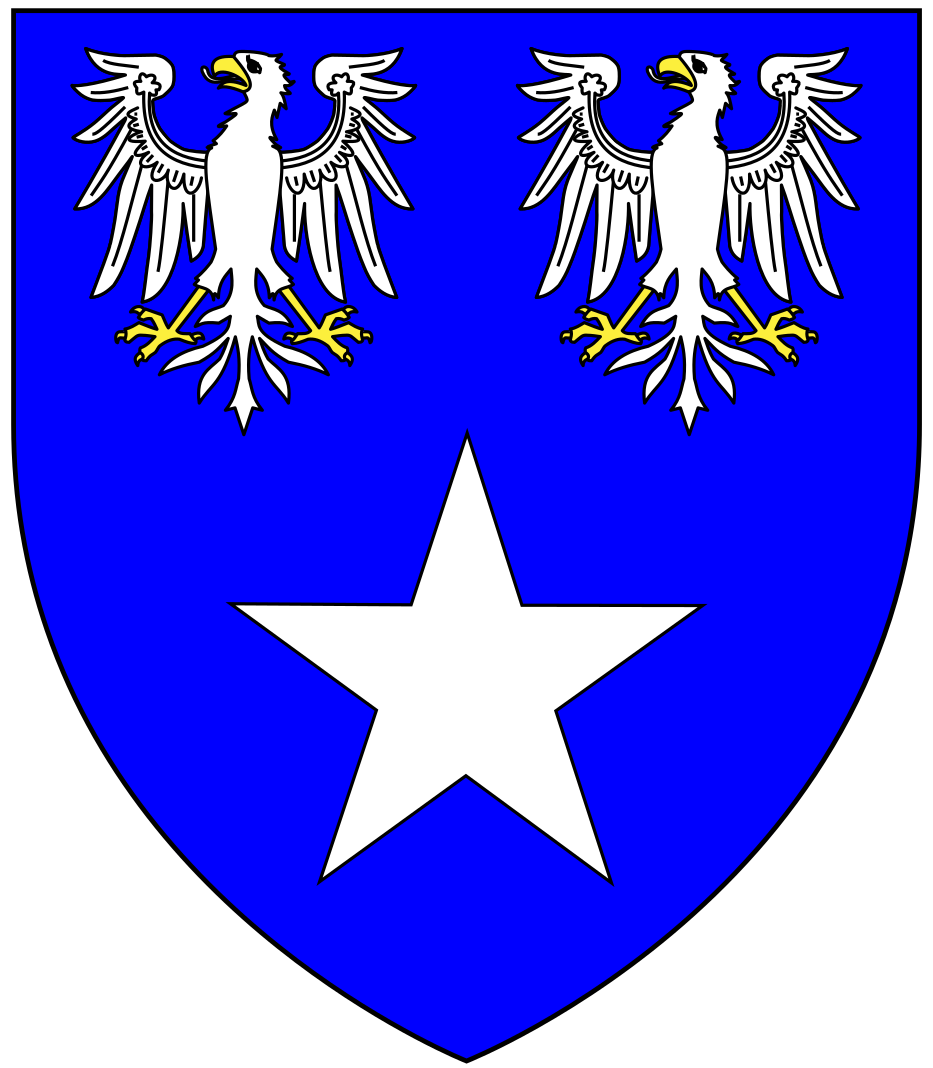
Arms of Fownes of Plymouth, Kittery Court & Nethway, in Devon & Dunster Castle in Somerset: Azure, two eagles displayed in chief and a mullet in base argent. (Note: Following his marriage and inheritance of Dunster Castle, Henry Fownes (c. 1722 – 1780) adopted the arms of Luttrell and quartered his paternal arms.)

==== Henry Fownes Luttrell (c. 1722 – 1780) ====
Henry Fownes (c. 1722 – 1780), who married the heiress Margaret Luttrell (1726–1766) and under his father-in-law's will inherited the Luttrell estates including Dunster Castle, with the proviso that he should adopt the surname and arms of Luttrell. He was High Sheriff of Somerset from 1754 to 1755, and a Member of Parliament for Minehead from 1768 to 1774. The couple modernised the Castle, in the Georgian style, which included the addition of new windows in the Dining Room and the Stair Hall and the putting up of then-fashionable Chinese painted wallpaper. In 1755 Henry started a major landscaping to form pleasure gardens and a 348-acre deer-park at the foot of the Castle, which replaced the former deer park situated some distance away at Blue Anchor Bay. He employed the Somerset landscape artist and portrait painter Richard Phelps (1710–1785) to add decorative features to the River Avill which flows in the valley beneath the Castle, including romantic bridges, arches and waterfalls. He also built the eye-catcher folly on nearby Conygar Hill known as Conygat Tower, designed by Phelps, visible from the Castle.

==== John Fownes Luttrell (1752–1816) ====
John Fownes Luttrell (1752–1816), eldest son and heir, of Dunster Castle. In 1770 he matriculated at Queen's College, Oxford. He was MP for Minehead (1776–1816). In 1782 he married Mary Drewe (died 1830), daughter (by his 2nd wife) of Francis Drewe (1712–1773) of The Grange, Broadhembury, Devon, High Sheriff of Devon in 1738, by whom he had 5 sons and 4 daughters.

==== John Fownes Luttrell (1787–1857) ====
John Fownes Luttrell (1787–1857), eldest son and heir, JP, DL, who died unmarried. MP for Minehead 1811–32

==== Henry Fownes Luttrell (1790–1867) ====
Henry Fownes Luttrell (1790–1867), younger brother and heir, JP and MP for Minehead 1816–22. He died childless.

==== George Fownes Luttrell (1826–1910) ====
George Fownes Luttrell (1826–1910), nephew, JP, DL, Sheriff of Somerset in 1874. He was the eldest son of Lt-Col Francis Fownes Luttrell (1792–1862) of Kilve Court and Wootton House, Wootton Fitzpaine, Dorset (3rd son of John Fownes Luttrell (1752–1816) of Dunster Castle), Lt-Col of the Grenadier Guards who fought and was wounded at the Battle of Waterloo in 1815 and was Lt-Col of the Somerset Militia in 1839. Francis's portrait in the library of Dunster Castle shows him in military uniform with his right eye missing, a battle wound. George's mother was Emma Louisa Drew (heiress of Wootton House), his father's first cousin, daughter of Samuel Drewe (1759-1837) of Kensington, Governor of the Bank of England. George Luttrell was Master of the West Somerset Foxhounds. In 1852 he married Anne Elizabeth Periam Hood (died 1917), youngest daughter of Sir Alexander Hood, 2nd Baronet, MP for West Somerset. Supported by a very large annual income of £22,000, he performed a major remodelling of the Castle to the designs of Anthony Salvin (1799–1881), which cost £25,350, and involved much demolition work (for example of the Chapel built in about 1716) and resulted in the addition of modern Victorian servants' quarters, a massive new block for the kitchens, and the installation of central heating, gas lighting and a bathroom with running hot water. He added a library, gun room, billiards room, "Justice Room" and many other major changes.

==== Alexander Fownes Luttrell (1855–1944) ====
Alexander Fownes Luttrell (1855–1944), eldest son. He preferred to live at Court House, the manor house of the Luttrell family's most ancient manor of East Quantoxhead (held since 1232), a few miles east of Dunster. He was a JP and DL for Somerset and a Captain in the Grenadier Guards. He supported many local organisations, including Minehead Hospital. In 1886, he married Aice Edwina Munro-Ferguson (died 1912), eldest daughter of Col. Robert Munro-Ferguson of Raith, Fife, Scotland, and sister of the 1st and last Viscount Novar. In the 1930s the estate comprised about 13,000 acres. He had refused out of high moral principles to effect tax-planning measures which might have reduced the sum of Death Duties payable on his death by his heir. This decision eventually forced his son to sell the estate.

==== Geoffrey Fownes Luttrell (1887–1957) ====
Geoffrey Fownes Luttrell (1887–1957), eldest son and heir. He was a JP for Somerset in 1911, and High Sheriff of Somerset in 1935. He was Principle Private Secretary to the Governor-General of Australia. In 1918 he married Alys Anne Bridges (died 1974), daughter of Rear-Admiral Walter Bridges, of Victoria, Australia, whom he had met in Australia. After his marriage he returned to England with his wife and moved into Dunster Castle, which had been given them by his father, who continued to live at East Quantoxhead. Although not a player himself, he was interested in polo and established a polo ground with stables at Dunster, and hosted tournaments.

During World War II he was vice-chairman of the Great Western Railway Company and during the war he made Dunster Castle available for use as a convalescent home by the Royal Navy. On the death of his father in 1944 the payment of a large sum in death duties left the estate indebted and uneconomic to operate, and Geoffrey, whilst reserving a tenancy for himself at the castle, sold the estates to a property development company which sold them on to the Commissioners of Crown Lands. He bought back the castle and grounds in 1954 and opened them to the paying public. He died in 1957 and his widow remained at the castle until her death in 1974.

==== Geoffrey Walter Fownes Luttrell (1919–2007) ====
Lt-Col Sir Geoffrey Walter Fownes Luttrell (1919–2007), KCVO, MC, eldest son and heir. He married Hermione Hamilton (1923–2009). He was a keen polo player and captained the Dunster team established by his father. He inherited the Castle and grounds on his father's death in 1957, but as his mother remained in residence there until her death in 1974, he lived at Court House, East Quantoxhead. In 1976, two years after his mother's death, he donated the Castle and grounds to the National Trust. He died without children and was survived by his younger brother Julian Fownes Luttrell (born 1932).

==== Julian Fownes Luttrell (born 1932) ====
Julian Fownes Luttrell (born 1932), younger brother, living in 2015, who rents from the Crown Estate the Home Farm of Dunster Castle with 330 acres situated below the Castle Tor, and lives nearby at Thorncombe, at the foot of the Quantocks. He did not fully agree with his elder brother's decision to donate the castle to the National Trust, "but didn't question the right that the castle belonged to him". In 1956 he was a joint founder, with his former army comrade Sir Neville Bowman-Shaw (a Deputy Lieutenant for Bedfordshire, knighted by Prime Minister Margaret Thatcher for exports), of the leading fork-lift truck company Lancer Boss, a major employer in Leighton Buzzard, which went into receivership in 1994 due to problems with its German affiliate. Following his marriage in 1973, he retired from the business, having been a director for 17 years, and returned to Dunster, where he obtained a lease of Home Farm from the Crown Commissioners. He has a daughter Serena and a son, Hugh, qualified in estate management, whom he hopes will succeed him in the Home Farm tenancy, and who is also heir to his uncle at East Quantoxhead. He maintains links with the National Trust and contributes his personal knowledge in helping to record the modern history of the Castle.

== Sources ==
- Burke's Genealogical and Heraldic History of the Landed Gentry, 15th Edition, ed. Pirie-Gordon, H., London, 1937, pp. 1437–9, Fownes-Luttrell of Dunster Castle
- Douglas, Sarah, A Souvenir Guide: Dunster Castle and Gardens, 2013
- Exmoor Oral History Archive, Dunster reminiscences of Julian Fownes Luttrell (born 1932), recorded in 2002
- Maxwell Lyte, Sir Henry, A History of Dunster and of the Families of Mohun and Luttrell, 2 Parts, London, 1909:
  - Part 1, London, 1909
  - Part 2, London, 1909 (Appendices)
- Sanders, I.J. English Baronies: A Study of their Origin and Descent 1086–1327, Oxford, 1960, p. 114, Dunster
- Somerset record Society, Vol.33, The Honour of Dunster
- Victoria County History, Somerset, Vol.1
- Vivian, Lt.Col. J.L., (Ed.) The Visitations of the County of Devon: Comprising the Heralds' Visitations of 1531, 1564 & 1620, Exeter, 1895, pp. 537–41, Luttrell
