= James Milner (disambiguation) =

James Milner (born 1986) is an English footballer.

James Milner may also refer to:

- James Milner (merchant) (died 1721), British merchant
- James Milner, 9th Seigneur of Sark (died 1730), British nobleman
- James Milner (art historian) (1874–1927), British art executive
- James Milner, 1st Baron Milner of Leeds (1889–1967), British politician
- Jim Milner (James Edward Milner, 1933–2017), English footballer

== See also ==
- James Millner (disambiguation)
- Milner (disambiguation)
