= Sir John Trevelyan, 2nd Baronet =

British landowner and Tory politician

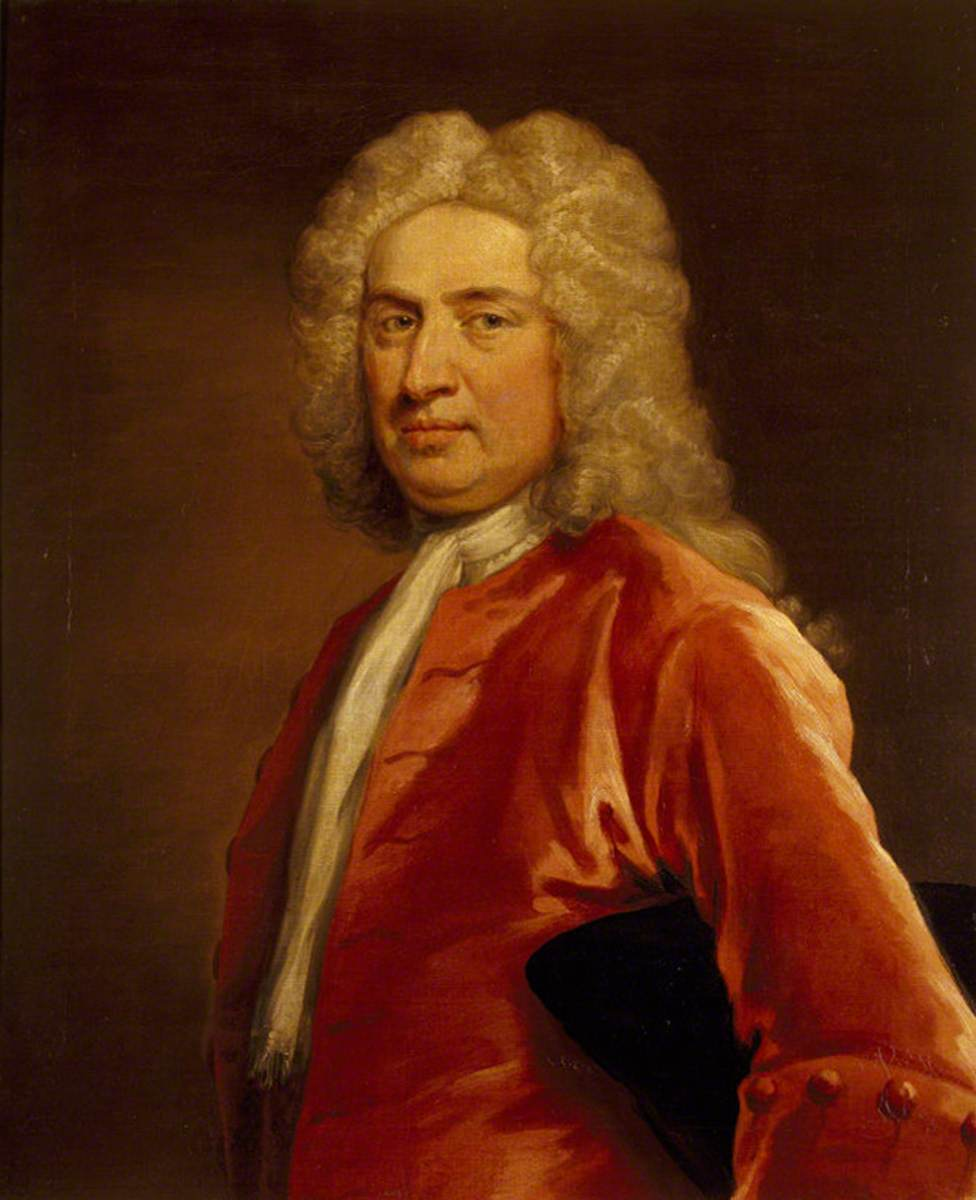
A portrait of John Trevelyan

Sir John Trevelyan, 2nd Baronet (9 April 1670 – 25 September 1755) was a British landowner and Tory politician who sat in the English and British House of Commons between 1695 and 1722.

Trevelyan was the eldest surviving son of Sir George Trevelyan, 1st Baronet of Nettlecombe Court and his wife Mary Willoughby, daughter of John Willoughby of Ley Hill, Honiton, Devon. A year old, in 1671, he succeeded to the baronetcy on the death of his father. He matriculated at Wadham College, Oxford in 1687.

Trevelyan sat as Member of Parliament for Somerset from 1695 to 1698 and in 1701 and was appointed High Sheriff of Somerset for the year 1704 to 1705. He was returned as MP for Minehead at the 1708 general election to 1715 and from 1717 to 1722.

Trevelyan died in September 1755, aged 85, having held the baronetcy for 84 years. He had married twice: firstly Urith Pole, the daughter of Sir John Pole, 3rd Baronet of Shute, with whom he had a daughter who predeceased him and secondly Susanna Warren, the daughter and heiress of William Warren of Stallensthorn, Devon, with whom he had 3 sons and 5 daughters. He was succeeded in the baronetcy by George Trevelyan, 3rd Baronet.

Parliament of England
| Preceded by Sir Edward Phelips; Nathaniel Palmer | Member of Parliament for Somerset; 1695–1698; With: Sir John Smith | Succeeded by Sir Edward Phelips; John Hunt |
| Preceded by John Hunt; Nathaniel Palmer | Member of Parliament for Somerset; 1701; With: John Hunt | Succeeded by Sir Philip Sydenham; Nathaniel Palmer |
Parliament of Great Britain
| Preceded by Alexander Luttrell; Sir Jacob Banks | Member of Parliament for Minehead; 1708–1717; With: Sir Jacob Banks 1708–15; Sir William Wyndham 1715–17 | Succeeded by Samuel Edwin; Thomas Gage |
| Preceded by Samuel Edwin; Thomas Gage | Member of Parliament for Minehead; 1717–1722; With: James Milner 1717–21; Sir Richard Lane 1721–22; Robert Mansel 1722 | Succeeded by Robert Mansel; Thomas Hales |
Baronetage of England
| Preceded by George Trevilian | Baronet (of Nettlecombe); 1671–1755 | Succeeded by George Trevelyan |
