= Jacob Banks (disambiguation) =

Jacob Banks (born 1991) is a British singer-songwriter.

Jacob Banks may also refer to:

- Jacob Banks (The Bill), fictional character in the British television series The Bill
- Jacob Banks Kurtz (1867–1960), Republican member of the U.S. House of Representatives from Pennsylvania
- Sir Jacob Bancks (1662–1724), also Banks, Swedish naval officer in the British service and Tory Member of Parliament
- Jacob Banks (MP for Shaftesbury) (1704–1738), British politician
