= Thomas Luttrell (died 1571) =

16th-century English politician

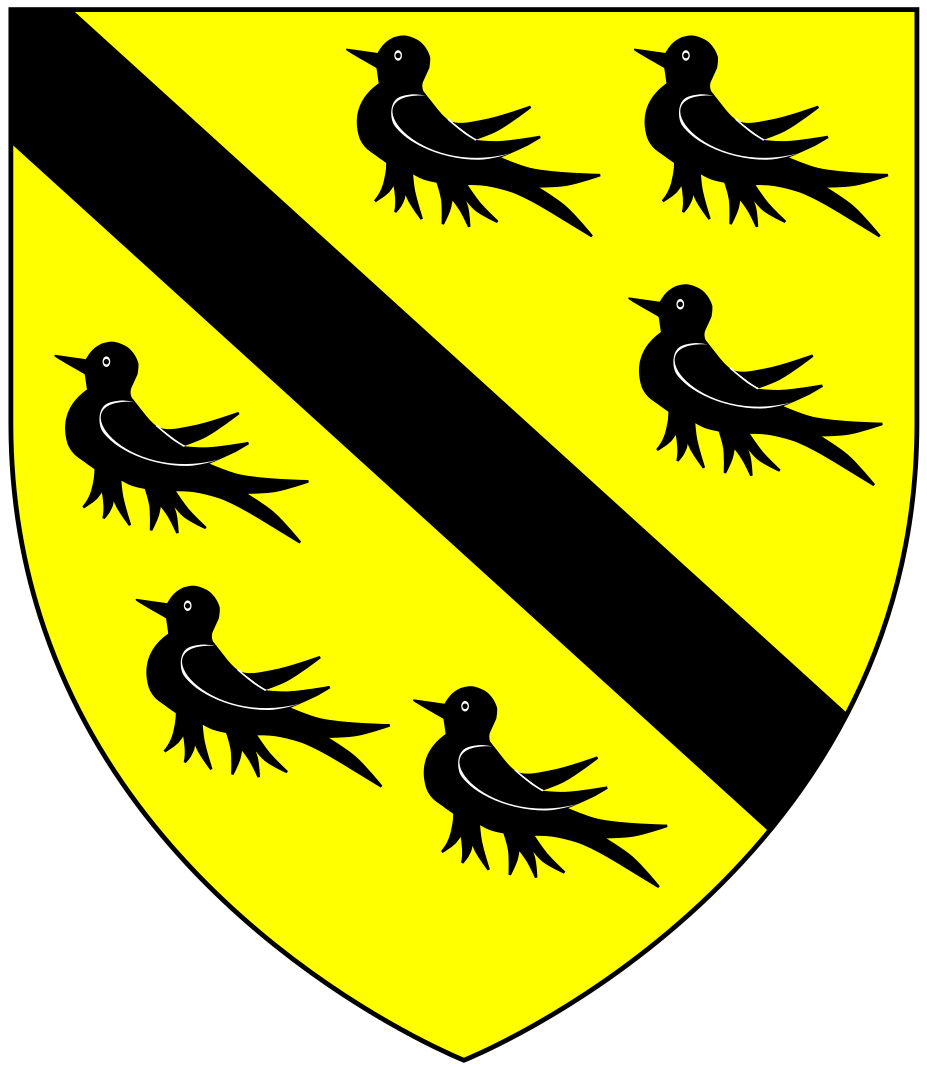
Arms of Luttrell: Or, a bend between six martlets sable

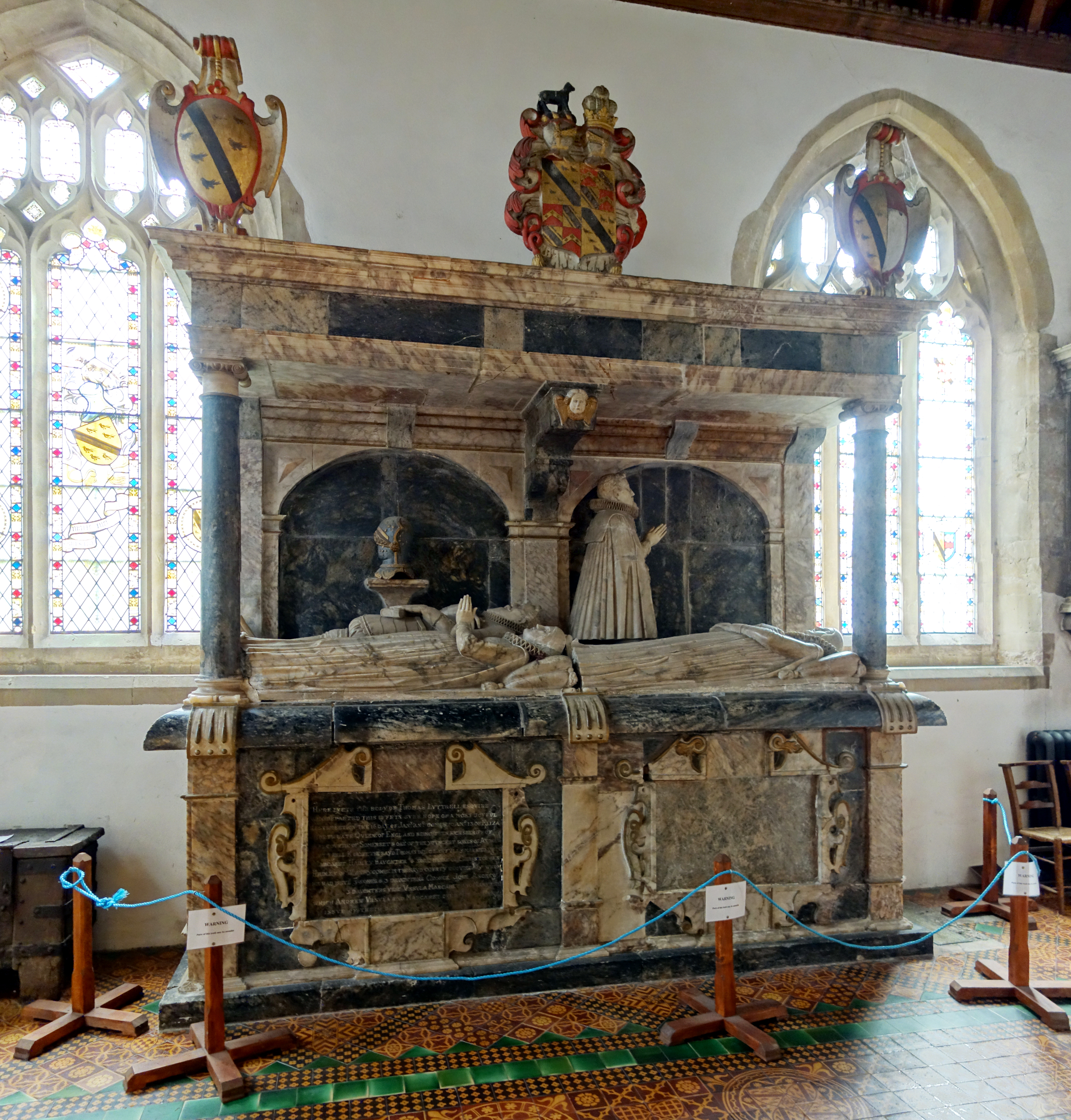
Monument in Dunster Church toThomas Luttrell (died 1571) of Dunster Castle and his wife, both recumbent effigies (left). To the right are shown Thomas's son George Luttrell (c.1560–1629) kneeling next to the recumbent effigy of his first wife, with his arms above centre quartering Hadley. Erected by George's son Thomas Luttrell (d.1644), whose arms impaling Popham are shown at top right

Thomas Luttrell (died 1571), of Dunster Castle in Somerset, feudal baron of Dunster, was a Member of Parliament for his family's newly enfranchised pocket borough of Minehead (two miles north-east of Dunster Castle), from 1563 to 1567 . He was Sheriff of Somerset in 1570–1.

== Origins ==
He was the second son and eventual heir of Sir Andrew Luttrell (1484–1538), feudal baron of Dunster, Sheriff of Somerset and Dorset in 1528, whose monument exists in East Quantoxhead Church, by his wife Margaret Wyndham (d.1580), a daughter of Sir Thomas Wyndham (d.1521) of Felbrigg Hall in Norfolk. Thomas inherited the family estates on the death of his elder brother Sir John Luttrell (d.1551), a soldier who died without male progeny.

== Career ==
He sold the Devon and Somerset estates, excepting Dunster Castle, apparently to meet debts. These were however "amply replaced" by the large estate inherited from his wife.

== Marriage ==
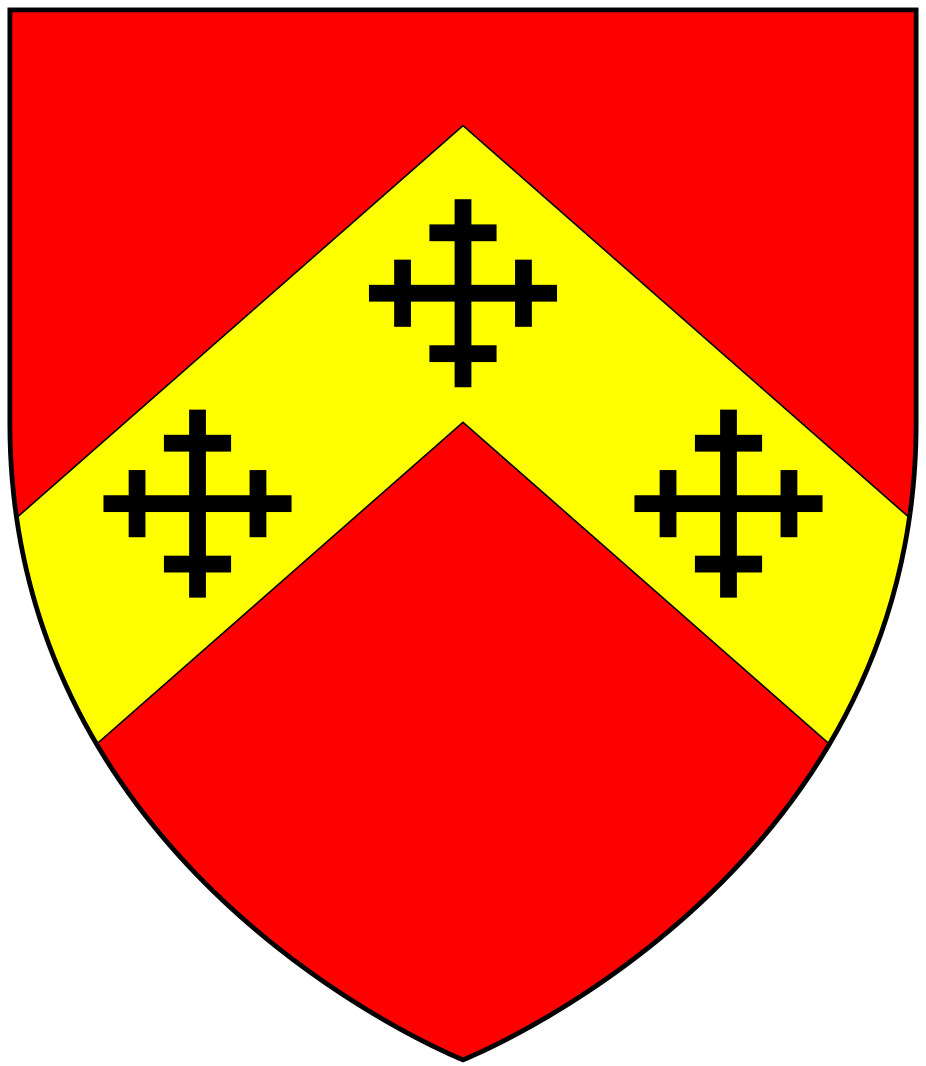
Arms of Hadley: Gules, on a chevron or three cross-crosslets sable

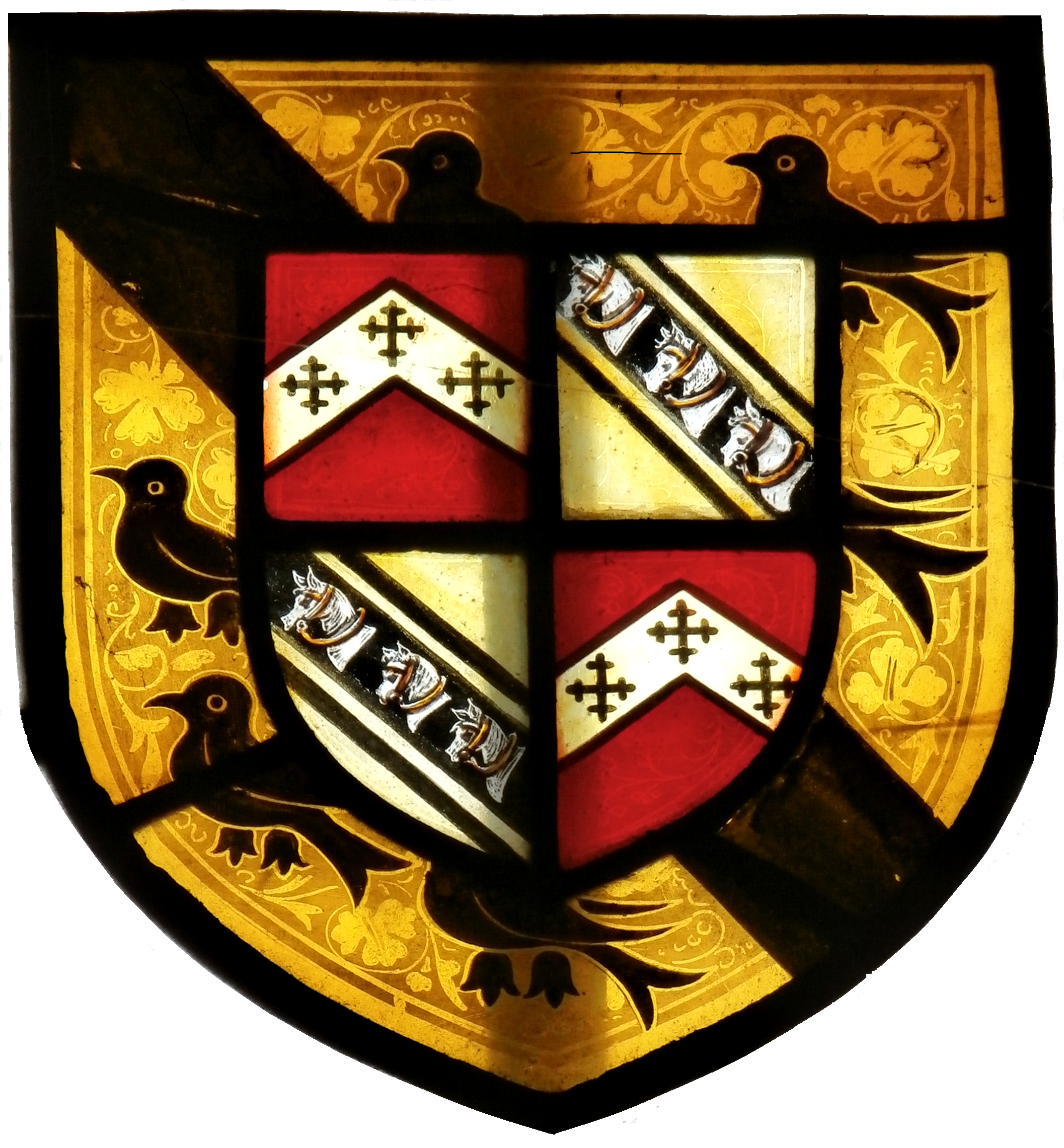
19th century stained glass in Dunster Church, showing arms of Thomas Luttrell (died 1571), showing arms of Luttrell with an inescutcheon of pretence of Hadley quartering Durborough of Withycombe

He married Margaret Hadley on 27 Aug 1560, daughter and eventual sole heiress of Christopher Hadley (1517-1540), lord of the manor of Withycombe Hadley in Somerset. The former manor house of the Hadleys survives as Court Place in the village of Withycombe. Thomas Luttrell and Margaret Hadley were related spiritually as well as by blood, as Margaret was the god-daughter of Thomas's mother, making them in the eyes of the church spiritually related as brother and sister; and both were descended from Elizabeth Courtenay (d.1493), daughter of Sir Philip Courtenay (1404–1463) of Powderham. Margaret's great-grandfather Richard Hadley had married Philippa Audley, a daughter of Sir Humphrey Audley (alias Touchet) (c.1434-1471) (a younger son of James Tuchet, 5th Baron Audley, 2nd Baron Tuchet (c. 1398–1459)), by his wife Elizabeth Courtenay (d.1493), who was the widow of Sir James Luttrell (d.1461), the great-grandfather of Thomas Luttrell. In consequence of this consanguinity in 1557 a papal bull was procured from Pope Paul V to sanction the marriage. The legal difficulties encountered by the marriage are related by Maxwell-Lyte as follows:

"The date and the exact circumstances of the marriage are not recorded, but we may fairly suppose it to have taken place in the reign of Edward the Sixth (1547-1553), when ecclesiastical discipline was somewhat lax. The validity of it was evidently challenged in the stricter reign of Philip and Mary (1553-1558), for the parties found it desirable to have recourse to Rome. A solemn document issued by the Cardinal of St. Angelo, Papal Penitentiary, at St. Peter's, on the 28th of November 1558, recites that Thomas Luttrell Esquire and Margaret Hadley had by their petition confessed that they had, without proper dispensation, been actually married, although related in the third and third, and in the third and fourth degrees of kindred, and although spiritually related, the mother of Thomas having stood godmother to Margaret at her baptism or confirmation. The language of the document leaves it doubtful whether the marriage had been solemnized in public and whether any issue had been actually born. Its effect, however, was to release the parties from the excommunication that they had incurred on condition of a fresh marriage "in the face of the church", and to legitimate any previous offspring. ... The dispensation, having been issued a few days after the accession of Elizabeth, was probably one of the very latest documents of the sort that was despatched before the final breach between England and Rome, and the sequel is perhaps the most curious part of the story. For nearly two years no further action was taken in the matter, but on the 27th of August 1560, Thomas Luttrell was solemnly married in the church of East Quantockshead, his bride being described in the register as "Mrs (i.e. "Mistress") Margaret Hadley". Their eldest son, George Luttrell, was born in the following month. In the inscription on the monument which he set up in memory of his parents, some sixty years later, it is expressly stated that they were 'lawfully married'".

It was probably the last instance in England of the remarriage of two persons who had been divorced on the score of a spiritual relationship.

== Progeny ==
By his wife he had 3 sons and 4 daughters, including:

- George Luttrell (died 1629), of Dunster Castle, eldest son and heir. He was twice Member of Parliament for Minehead, in 1572 and 1584. He was twice Sheriff of Somerset, in 1593 and 1609 and built the pier in Minehead harbour. He embarked on a major rebuilding of Dunster Castle.
- John Luttrell (1566–1620), MP.
- Andrew Luttrell, baptized at Dunster on the 14th of October 1569. He died without issue.
- Cecily Luttrell, wife of Richard Rogers.
- Margaret Luttrell.
- Ursula Luttrell.
- Mary Luttrell, baptized at Dunster on the 11th of October 1567. She married Sir Robert Strode of Parnham in Dorset.

== Monument ==
Thomas Luttrell's impressive monument with effigies, erected by his son George in 1621, survives in Dunster Church, inscribed as follows:

Here lyeth the body of Thomas Luttrell Esquire who departed this lyfe in sure hope of a most joyful resurrection the 16 day of Jan^{y} An^{o} Dom 1570 An^{o} 13 of Elizabeth late Queene of England, being then High Sheriff of the Countie of Somerset & one of the youngest sones of Andrew Luttrell, Knight, the sayd Thomas being lawfully married unto Margaret Hadley daughter & sole heire of Christopher Hadley of Wythycombe in the sayd county Esquire, by whom he had issue 3 sonnes & 3 daughters, George, John, Andrew, 3 daughters vidz Ursula, Margaret and Mary the which Andrew, Ursula and Margaret dyed without any issue of their bodyes.

The heraldry is as follows: top left, Luttrell; top right (arms of George's son, Thomas), Luttrell impaling Argent, on a chief gules two stag's heads cabossed or (Popham), also visible in Marshwood House, Blue Anchor; centre (arms of George Luttrell), Luttrell quartering: quarterly of four, 1&4: Gules, on a chevron or three cross crosslets sable(Hadley), 2&3: Or, on a bend cotised sable three horse's heads and necks argent bridled or (Durborough of Withycombe).

== See also ==
- Feudal barony of Dunster

Parliament of England
New constituency	Member of Parliament for Minehead; 1563 – 1567; With: Thomas Fitzwilliams	Succeeded by John Colles; Thomas Mallett
