= Jacob Bancks =

Swedish naval officer

Sir Jacob Bancks (also Banks, Bankes, Banckes) (1662–1724) was a Swedish naval officer in the British service. He settled in England and became a Tory Member of Parliament.

== Early life ==
His parents were Lawrence Bengston Bancks of Stockholm, a customs commissioner, and his wife Christina. He arrived in England in 1681 as a diplomat and served as secretary to his uncle, Johan Barckman (Hans Barikman) Leijonberg, the Swedish resident in London at that time. The resident's name is often Anglicized as James Barkman Leyenburg, but it is also mentioned as John Birkman, Count of Lezenburgh.

== Naval officer ==
Bancks joined the Royal Navy in 1681. In 1690, he participated in the Battle of Beachy Head, where he took over command from his wounded captain. Shortly after the battle, Bancks received a commission as captain and assumed command of HMS Cambridge in September 1690. During the same year, he purchased Hall Place in Berkshire.

In 1692, as captain of HMS Phoenix, Bancks was off the coast of Spain when his ship was forced ashore on 12 April by a more powerful French naval force. To prevent the ship from being captured, The Phoenix was set on fire. Bancks served as captain of HMS Carlisle in 1693. He was on half pay from 1696, or from the conclusion of the Treaty of Ryswick (end 1697). He was knighted in 1698, as captain of HMS Russell, which he had commanded since 1696.

== In politics ==
He married the widow Mary Luttrell (née Tregonwell) in 1696 and served as the Member of Parliament for Minehead from 1698. Initially, he shared the seat with Alexander Luttrell, the brother of Francis, his wife's first husband. He was subsequently involved in the rougher side of the Whig-Tory factional strife.

Bancks had George Rooke as stepson for a short period, since Rooke's second wife was Mary Luttrell (died 1702), daughter of his wife by her first marriage. Bancks, Rooke and some others belonged to a gentleman's club, for which commemorative medals were struck in 1703 by the visiting Swedish medallist, Bengt Richter; another member who was an M.P. was Tanfield Vachell. A legal case resulted from the connection. After a quarrel with Rooke, William Colepeper claimed that an attempt, on behalf of Rooke, was made upon his life. He had been assaulted at Windsor Castle in July 1703, by Bancks in particular, on the occasion of Colepeper's delivering a petition for Daniel Defoe who was imprisoned. After a trial before Lord-justice Sir John Holt, 14 February 1704, some persons associated with Rooke were fined for attempts to do Colepeper injury: Nathaniel Denew, John Merriam and Robert Britton. Later in 1704 Bancks was allowed the assistance of Sir Simon Harcourt the Solicitor-General to prepare against a case brought by Colepeper.

In 1711 Bancks was attacked in an open letter, initially published anonymously, by the Whig publicist William Benson. It was provoked by an address the year before by Bancks to the borough, commending the doctrine of passive obedience over Whig resistance theory. Benson aimed to associate the "Minehead doctrine" he attributed to Bancks with the absolutism of Charles XII of Sweden. He followed it with another such letter. In 1713 Benson and James Milner of London stood against Bancks and Sir John Trevelyan, 2nd Baronet in Minehead. The Tory pair won the borough, but Bancks did not stand again.

== Jacobite ==
Bancks was implicated in the "Gyllenberg Plot", a Jacobite conspiracy in 1716–7 set up by Carl Gyllenborg and Georg Heinrich von Görtz. He was taken into custody, with Charles Caesar, on 29 January 1717, the day on which General George Wade implicated Gyllenborg in plotting by finding incriminating papers. Another arrest was Boyle Smith. Bancks and Caesar had in fact raised and sent to Sweden £18,000 to support a putative Jacobite invasion; but there was little intention in Sweden of spending it for that purpose.

== Legacy ==
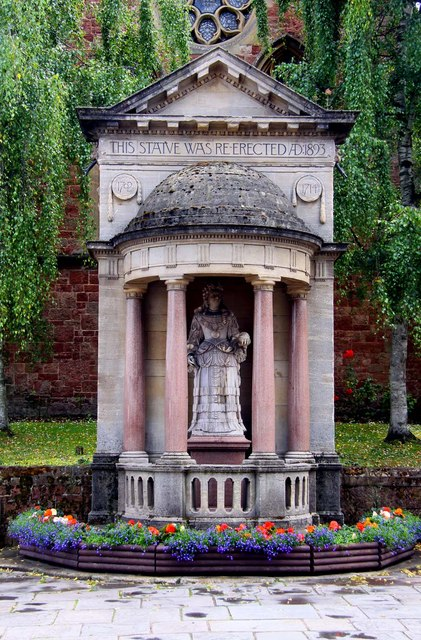
Statue of Queen Anne, now in Wellington Square, Minehead, and commissioned by Sir Jacob Bancks from Francis Bird.

Around 1715 he commissioned Francis Bird to sculpt a statue of Queen Anne for Minehead.

== Family ==
Jacob Bancks (1704–1738), also a Member of Parliament, was his son. When the younger Jacob Bancks died intestate, a complex lawsuit arose, involving the Swedish side of the family.

== Notes ==
Parliament of England
Preceded by John Sanford; Alexander Luttrell	Member of Parliament for Minehead; 1698–1707; With: Alexander Luttrell	Succeeded by Parliament of Great Britain
Parliament of Great Britain
Preceded by Parliament of England	Member of Parliament for Minehead; 1707–1715; With: Alexander Luttrell 1707-1708; Sir John Trevelyan 1708-1715	Succeeded by Sir William Wyndham; Sir John Trevelyan
