= John Malet =

English lawyer and politician

Sir John Malet (1623–1686) was an English lawyer and politician who sat in the House of Commons between 1666 and 1685.

Malet was the eldest son of Sir Thomas Malet of Poyntington and his wife Jane Mylles, daughter of Francis Mylles. His father was a judge and Royalist supporter. Malet entered Middle Temple in 1634 and matriculated at University College, Oxford on 18 January 1638 aged 15. He was called to the bar in 1641 but was automatically disbarred during the Interregnum. He was J.P. for Somerset from July 1660 to 1680 and commissioner for assessment from August 1660 to 1680. He was commissioner for sewers for Somerset in December 1660, and commissioner for oyer and terminer on the western circuit in 1661. In 1662 he was commissioner for loyal and indigent officers for Somerset. He succeeded to his father's estate in 1665.

In 1666, Malet was elected Member of Parliament for Minehead. He was knighted on 20 February 1667. He was a member of the Green Ribbon Club. From 1667 to 1669, he was commissioner for assessment for Devon and Exeter. He was Recorder of Bridgwater from 1669 to 1683. He was commissioner for assessment for Devon and Exeter from 1673 to 1680 and commissioner for recusants for Somerset in 1675. In March 1679 he was re-elected MP for Minehead in the First Exclusion Parliament. He was elected MP for Bridgwater in 1681.

Malet died at the age of 63 and was buried at St Andrew's, Holborn on 8 April 1686.

Malet married Florence Wyndham, daughter of John Wyndham of Orchard Wyndham, Somerset and had three sons and six daughters.

Parliament of England
Preceded by Francis Luttrell I Sir Hugh Wyndham	Member of Parliament for Minehead; 1666–1679; With: Sir Hugh Wyndham 1666-73; Thomas Wyndham 1673-79; Francis Luttrell II 1679	Succeeded by Francis Luttrell II; Thomas Palmer
Preceded by Sir Halswell Tynte; Ralph Stawell	Member of Parliament for Bridgwater; 1681–1685; With: Sir Halswell Tynte	Succeeded by Sir Halswell Tynte; Sir Francis Warre
