= Francis Luttrell (1628–1666) =

English lawyer and politician

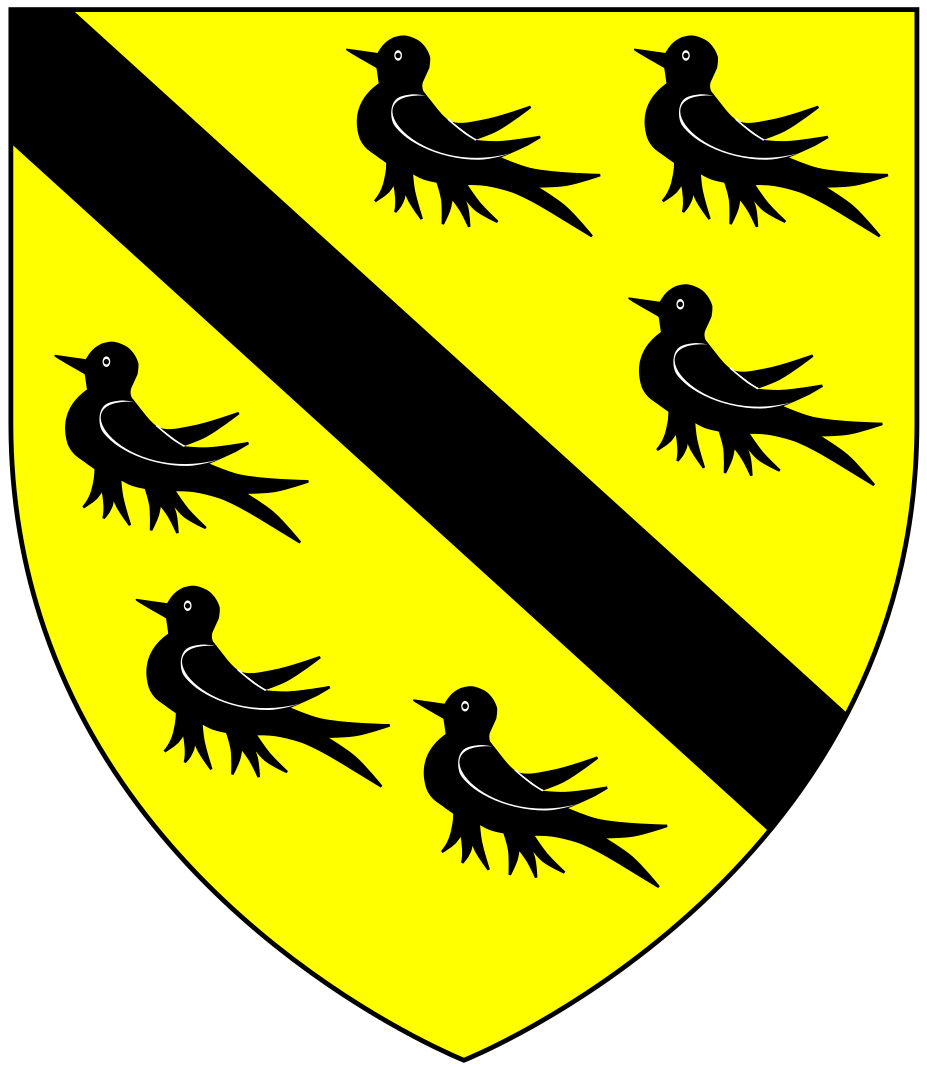
Arms of Luttrell: Or, a bend between six martlets sable

Francis Luttrell (1628–1666) of Dunster Castle, Somerset, was an English lawyer and politician who sat in the House of Commons at various times between 1656 and 1666.

== Origins ==
He was baptised on 1 November 1628. He was the heir of his elder brother George Luttrell (d. 1655) of Dunster Castle and the second surviving son of Thomas Luttrell (died 1644) of Dunster Castle by his wife Jane Popham, daughter of Sir Francis Popham of Littlecote, Wiltshire. His younger brother was Alexander Luttrell, MP for Minehead.

== Career ==
He entered Lincoln's Inn in 1646 and was called to the bar in 1653. In 1655 he succeeded his elder brother George Luttrell (d. 1655) of Dunster Castle, Sheriff of Somerset in 1652, who died childless, having married three times. In 1656 he was elected Member of Parliament for Somerset. He was a JP for Somerset from 1657 to 1659 and a Commissioner for Assessment for Somerset in 1657 and from January 1660 until his death. He became a JP for Somerset again from March 1660 until his death. He became Commissioner for Militia for Somerset in March 1660 and Colonel of Militia in April 1660. In April 1660 Luttrell was elected MP for the family's pocket borough of Minehead in the Convention Parliament. He was proposed as a Knight of the Royal Oak, with an income of £1,500 per year. He was commissioner for sewers in August and December 1660. In 1661 he was re-elected MP for Minehead in the Cavalier Parliament and sat until his death in 1666.

== Marriage and children ==
On 8 October 1655 Luttrell married Lucy Symonds, daughter of Thomas Symonds of Whittlesford, Cambridgeshire, and granddaughter of John Pym, by whom he had three sons:

- Thomas Luttrell (d. 1670), eldest son and heir, who died a minor, without children.
- Col. Francis Luttrell (1659–1690), of Dunster Castle, 2nd son and heir to his elder brother. He matriculated at Christ Church, Oxford in 1676 and was MP for Minehead 1679–90. He married Mary Tregonwell (d. 1704), only daughter and sole heiress of John Tregonwell of Milton Abbey, by whom he had two daughters, Mary and Frances, and a son and heir Tregonwell Luttrell (1683–1703), of Dunster Castle, who died childless.
- Col. Alexander Luttrell (1663–1711), youngest son, of Dunster Castle, who was heir to his nephew Tregonwell Luttrell (1683–1703), of Dunster Castle, and whose own son Alexander Luttrell (1705–1737) of Dunster Castle was the last in the male line of the Luttrell family, whose only daughter and sole heiress Margaret Luttrell (1726–1766) married Henry Fownes (c. 1722–1780), who adopted the name and arms of Luttrell.

== Death ==
Luttrell died in 1666 at the age of 37 and was buried at Dunster on 14 March 1666.

Parliament of England
Preceded by Sir John Horner; John Buckland; General John Desborough; John Preston; John Harrington; John Ashe; Charles Steynings; Robert Long; Richard Jones; Thomas Hippisley; Samuel Perry	Member of Parliament for Somerset; 1656; With: John Buckland; General John Desborough; John Harrington; John Ashe; Robert Long; Alexander Popham; Colonel John Gorges; Sir Lislebone Long; William Wyndham; Francis Rolle	Succeeded by John Buckland; Robert Hunt
Preceded by Walter Strickland	Member of Parliament for Minehead; 1660–1666; With: Charles Pym to 1661; Hugh Wyndham from 1661	Succeeded by Sir John Malet; Hugh Wyndham
