= Alexander Luttrell (1663–1711) =

English army officer and politician

Colonel Alexander Luttrell MP
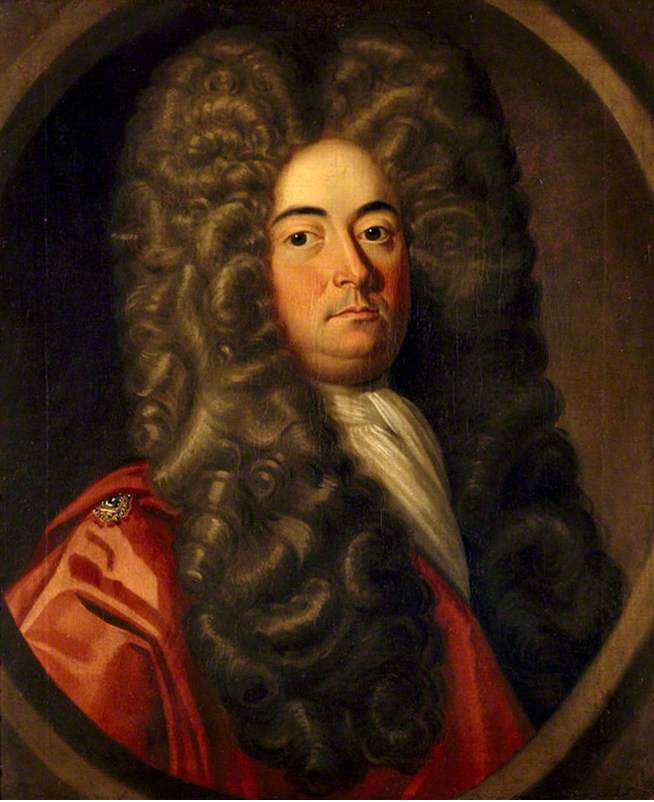
- Colonel Alexander Luttrell

Member of Parliament for Minehead
- In office 1690–1705

Personal details
- Born: 20 October 1663 Dunster, Somerset, England
- Died: 22 September 1711 (aged 47) Dunster, Somerset, England
- Resting place: Priory Churchyard of St. George, Dunster, West Somerset District, Somerset, England
- Spouse: Dorothy Yarde (20 July 1702 to his death)
- Children: Two sons, one daughter
- Parent(s): Francis Luttrell (1628–1666), Lucy Symonds
- Education: Christ Church, Oxford
- Occupation: Landowner, army officer and politician

Military service
- Years of service: 1688 to 1705
- Rank: Colonel

Alexander Luttrell (20 October 1663 – 22 September 1711) was an English army officer and politician.

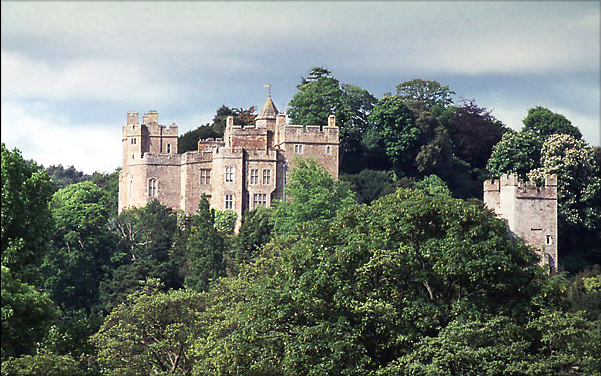
Dunster Castle – seat of the Luttrell family

He was the third son of Francis Luttrell (1628–1666) of Dunster Castle. His mother Lucy was a daughter of Thomas Symonds of Whittlesford, Cambridgeshire. Colonel Francis Luttrell (1659–1690) was his older brother. He inherited the heavily indebted Dunster Castle after the death of both his elder brothers and then his brother Francis's son in 1703.

He sat in the House of Commons of England from 1690 to 1707 as a Member of Parliament (MP) for Minehead, and then held the seat for a further year in the House of Commons of Great Britain.

He married, in 1702, Dorothy, the daughter of Edward Yard of Churston Ferrers, Devon and had two sons and a daughter.

== See also ==
- Feudal barony of Dunster

Parliament of England
Preceded by Francis Luttrell; John Sanford	Member of Parliament for Minehead; 1690–1707; With: John Sanford to 1698; Sir Jacob Banks from 1698	Succeeded by Parliament of Great Britain
Parliament of Great Britain
Preceded by Parliament of England	Member of Parliament for Minehead; 1707–1708; With: Sir Jacob Banks	Succeeded by Sir John Trevelyan, Bt; Sir Jacob Banks
