= Francis Luttrell (1659–1690) =

English landowner and politician

Francis Luttrell MP, JP
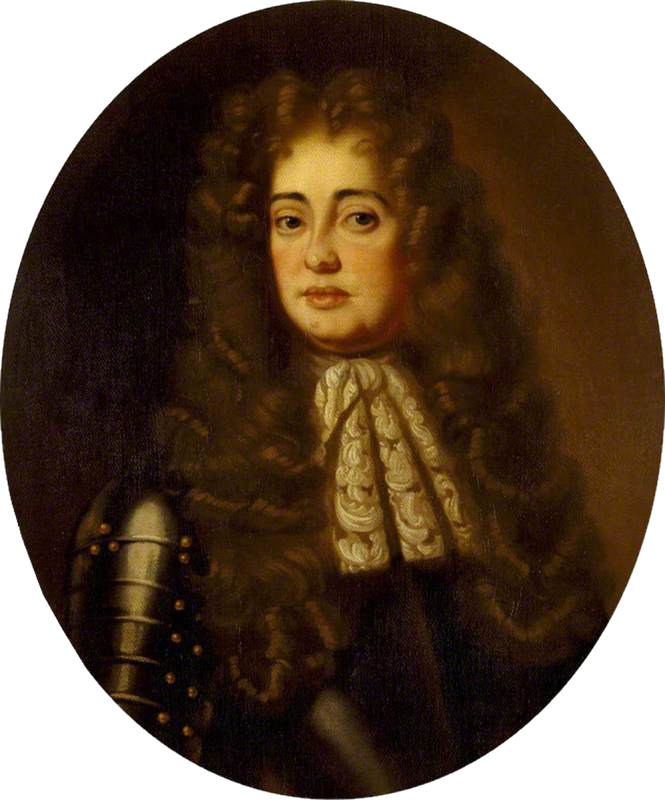
- Colonel Francis Luttrell

Member of Parliament for Minehead
- In office March 1679 – July 1690

Deputy Lieutenant of Dorset
- In office 1685–1687

Deputy Lieutenant of Somerset
- In office 1681–1687

Personal details
- Born: 16 June 1659 (baptised)
- Died: 25 July 1690 (aged 31) Plymouth
- Spouse: Mary Tregonwell (July 1680 to his death)
- Children: One son, two daughters
- Parent(s): Francis Luttrell (1628–1666), Lucy Symonds
- Education: Christ Church, Oxford
- Occupation: Landowner

Military service
- Years of service: 1642 to 1646
- Rank: Colonel
- Battles/wars: Monmouth Rebellion; Glorious Revolution; Nine Years War

Francis Luttrell (June 1659 to 25 July 1690) of Dunster Castle in Somerset was a landowner and MP for Minehead from 1679 until his death.

== Personal details ==
Francis Luttrell was baptised on 16 June 1659, second son of Francis Luttrell (1628–1666), and his wife Lucy Symonds, granddaughter of the politician John Pym. He had an older brother Thomas (1657–1670) and a younger Alexander (1663–1711).

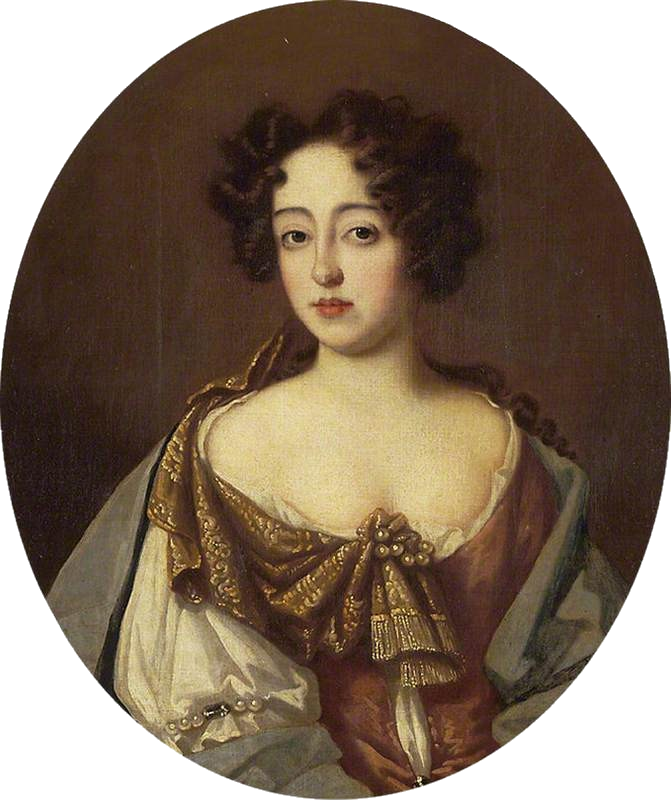
Mary Luttrell (Tregonwell)

In July 1680, he married Mary Tregonwell, a wealthy heiress with an estate worth £2,500 per annum, much of which was spent refurbishing Dunster Castle, the family home. They had a son Tregonwell (1683–1703) and two daughters.

== Career ==
Educated like other members of his family at Christ Church, Oxford, he was first elected MP for Minehead in March 1679, when still technically underage. He retained the seat until his death in 1690 and served as Deputy Lieutenant of Somerset from 1681 to 1687, Deputy Lieutenant of Dorset from 1685 to 1687, and Vice-Admiral of Somerset from 1685. He resigned these offices after refusing to back James II of England in his demand for repeal of the Test Act.

As a colonel in the local militia, Luttrell had helped suppress the Monmouth Rebellion in June 1685 but in the November 1688 Glorious Revolution he backed James' removal by his son-in-law William of Orange. When William landed in Devon, Francis mustered a number of companies of infantry, which formed the basis for the later Green Howards regiment. He died at Plymouth on 25 July while he and his regiment were awaiting transport to Flanders for service in the Nine Years War.

== See also ==
- Feudal barony of Dunster

== Sources ==
- Garnett, Oliver (2003). Dunster Castle, Somerset. The National Trust. ISBN 978-1-84359-049-1.
- Cassidy, Irene (1983). LUTTRELL, Francis II (1659-90), of Dunster Castle, Somerset in The History of Parliament: the House of Commons 1660-1690. Boydell and Brewer.

Parliament of England
Preceded by Thomas Wyndham; Sir John Malet	Member of Parliament for Minehead; 1679–1690; With: Sir John Malet to September 1679; Thomas Palmer September 1679 – 1685; Nathaniel Palmer 1685 – September 1690; John Sanford from September 1690	Succeeded by Alexander Luttrell; John Sanford
