= Samuel Edwin =

English politician

Samuel Edwin (12 March 1671 – 27 September 1722), of Llanmihangel Plas, Glamorgan, was an English politician who sat in the House of Commons briefly in 1717.

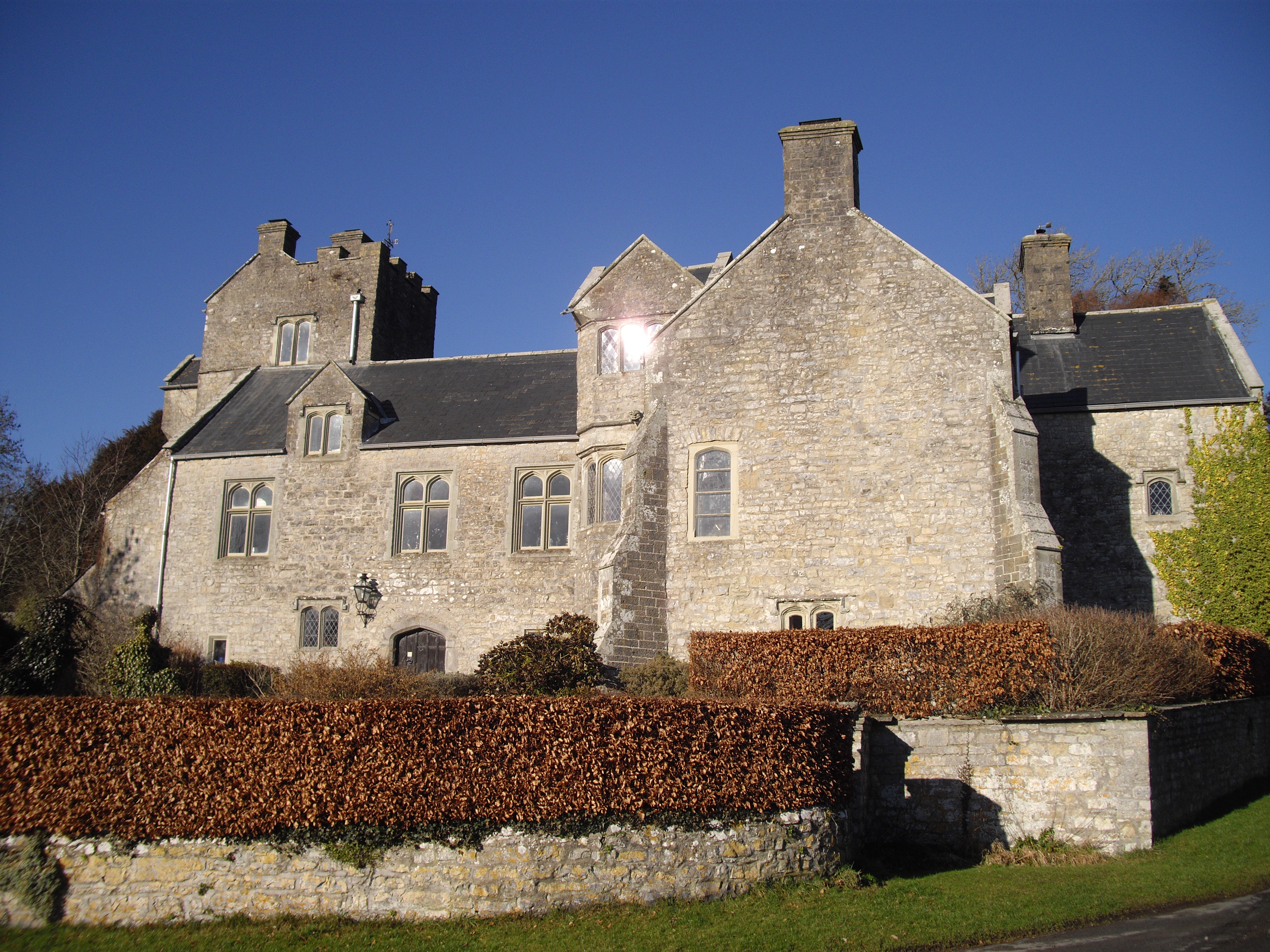
Llanmihangel Place

Edwin was the eldest son of Sir Humphrey Edwin, who was Lord Mayor of London from 1697 to 1698, and his wife Elizabeth Sambrooke, daughter of Samuel Sambrooke, merchant of London. He matriculated at Pembroke College, Oxford on 15 April 1687, aged 15 and was admitted at Lincoln's Inn on 11 July 1689. He married Lady Catherine Montagu, daughter of Robert Montagu, 3rd Earl of Manchester by licence dated 20 September 1697. In 1707, on the death of his father, he inherited extensive properties in Westminster and Glamorgan.

Edwin stood for Parliament as a Tory at Minehead at the 1715 general election, but was unsuccessful. He was returned as Member of Parliament for Minehead in the poll at a by-election on 11 April 1717 but was unseated on petition just over a month later on 23 May. He stood for Minehead again at the 1722 general election, but was again defeated.

Edwin died on 27 September 1722 leaving a son and daughter. His son Charles was an MP for Westminster from 1741 to 1747, and for Glamorgan from 1747 to 1756. His daughter Anne married Thomas Wyndham MP of Clearwell Court.

Parliament of the United Kingdom
Preceded by Sir William Wyndham, Bt; Sir John Trevelyan, Bt	Member of Parliament for Minehead; 1717; With: Thomas Gage	Succeeded by James Milner; Sir John Trevelyan, Bt
