= James Millner =

James Millner may refer to:

- James Millner (doctor) (1830–1875), doctor and pioneer of northern Australia
- Jim Millner (1919–2007), pharmacist and Australian corporate executive

== See also ==
- James Milner, English footballer
