= Thomas Luttrell (1583–1644) =

English politician

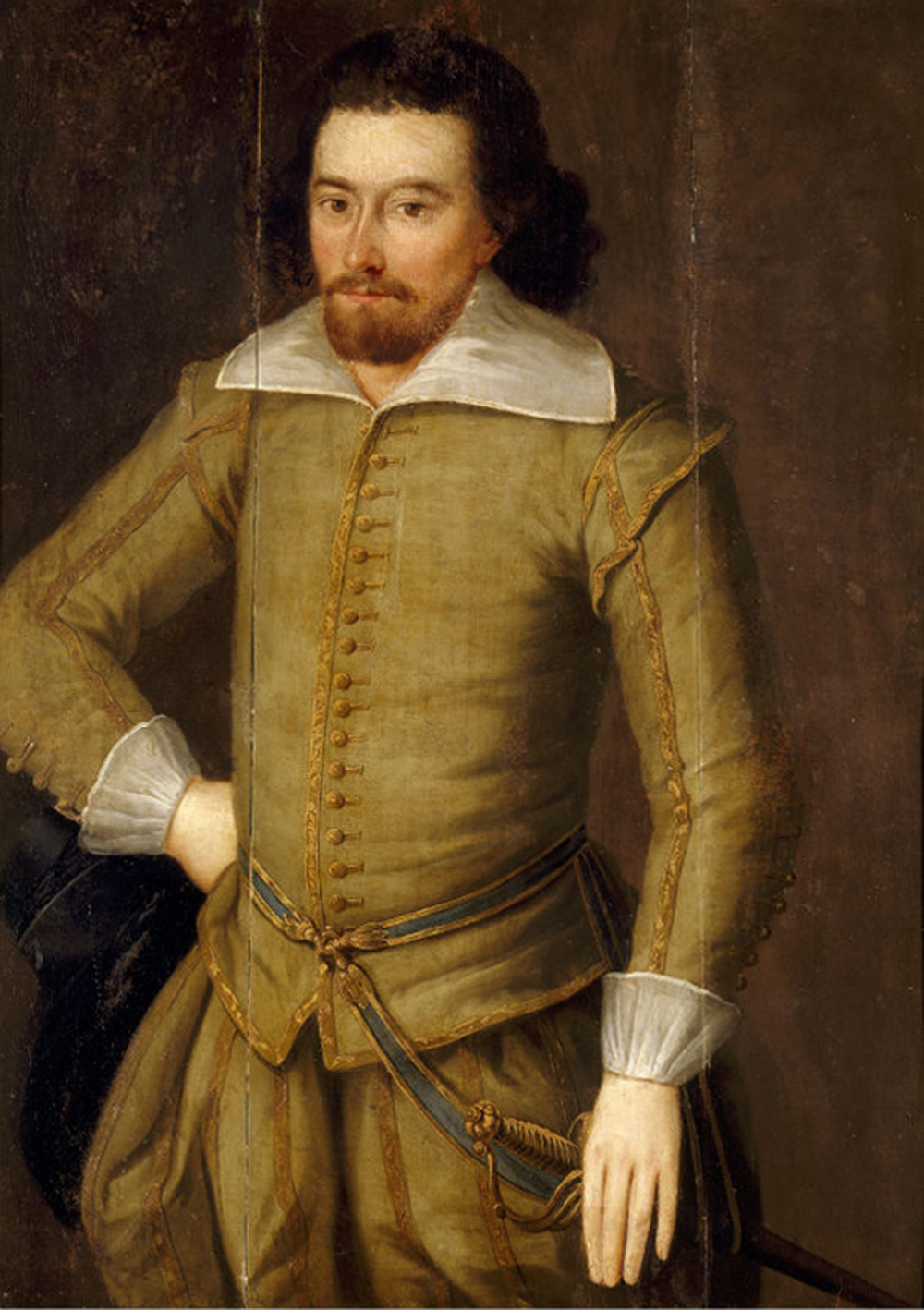
Thomas Luttrell (1584–1644) of Dunster Castle, British (English) School, National Trust, Dunster Castle collection. Donated in 1981 by Lieutenant-Colonel Geoffrey Walter Fownes Luttrell (1919–2007)

Thomas Luttrell (1583–1644) was an English politician from Dunster Castle in Somerset. In 1625 he sat in the Useless Parliament as a Member of Parliament (MP) for his family's pocket borough of Minehead.

Thomas Luttrell was the oldest son of George Luttrell of Dunster Castle and was baptized on 26 Feb 1583. He was educated at Lincoln College, Oxford and at Lincoln's Inn. He had inherited seven manors in north-west Somerset, and held numerous public offices in the county including Deputy Lieutenant from 1629 to at least 1640, and Sheriff in 1631–32.

Thomas Luttrell married Jane Popham, daughter of Sir Francis Popham and his wife Ann Dudley, on 15 May 1621 in Stoke Newington St Mary Parish, Hackney District, Middlesex, England.

Their children:

1. George Luttrell, died 1655.
2. Alexander Luttrell, baptized 01 Mar 1622.
3. Thomas Luttrell, baptized 08 Mar 1627, died 2 Apr 1627.
4. Francis Luttrell, baptized 01 Nov 1628, buried 14 Mar 1665.
5. Amye Luttrell, baptized 26 Jun 1629.

== See also ==
- Feudal barony of Dunster

Parliament of England
Preceded by Arthur Duck; Sir Arthur Lake	Member of Parliament for Minehead; 1625; With: Charles Pyne	Succeeded by John Gill; Thomas Horner
