= James Milner (merchant) =

English merchant

- Born: After 1658
- Died: 24 November 1721
- Occupation: Merchant

James Milner (Born after 1658; died 24 November 1721) was an English merchant and member of parliament.

== Biography ==
Milner was extensively engaged in the trade with Portugal, and his commercial transactions with that country enabled him to render great service to the government in the remittance of money abroad. During the controversy on the eighth and ninth clauses of the commercial treaty with France (1713) he contributed to the "British Merchant" several articles on the "Methuen Treaty and the Trade with Portugal," in which he combated the arguments advanced by Daniel Defoe in the "Mercator". He was returned to parliament for the borough of Minehead on 11 April 1717, and he voted for the repeal of the acts to prevent occasional conformity in January 1718–19. He died on 24 November 1721.

Milner's articles on the trade with Portugal, which had first appeared in 1713–14, were republished, under the editorship of Charles King, in the "British Merchant," London, 1721, 8vo (i. 206–22, iii. 3–92), but there is no evidence to show to what extent he was aided by other writers in the same work. He also published "Three Letters relating to the South Sea Company and the Bank," &c., London, 1720, 8vo, in which he foretold the disastrous results of the South Sea scheme.

Parliament of England
Preceded by Samuel Edwin; Thomas Gage	Member of Parliament for Minehead; 1717–1722; With: James Milner 1717–21; Sir Richard Lane 1721–22; Robert Mansel 1722	Succeeded by Robert Mansel; Thomas Hales
