= Nathaniel Palmer (politician) =

English politician (died 1718)

Nathaniel Palmer (c. 1661 – 16 January 1718) was an English politician. He sat as MP for Minehead in 1685 and 1689, Somerset in 1690, Bridgwater in 1695, Somerset on 10 May 1699, December 1701, 1702, and 1705 and Bridgwater in 1710 and 1713.

Palmer was given the Alfred Jewel several years after its discovery in 1693 by Sir Thomas Wroth, Palmer's cousin. Following his death, the jewel was given to Oxford University.

== Family and education ==
He was the second but first surviving son of Peregrine Palmer and the brother of Thomas Palmer. He was educated at Winchester school in 1675. He was matriculated into Trinity College, Oxford on 22 March 1678, aged 17. He entered the Middle Temple in 1678. Circa. 1682, he married Frances (died 14 May 1712), the daughter of Sir William Wyndham, 1st Baronet and they had two sons and four daughters.

== Political career ==
His political career began within a few months of inheriting his father's estates in Somerset and Sussex. During James II's Parliament, he was not an active member. He was only named to the committee for the bill to prevent the export of wool. He refused his consent to the repeal of the Test and Penal Laws. In November 1688, he joined William of Orange at Exeter. He voted to agree with the Lords that the throne was not vacant. Under William III and Anne, he generally voted with the Tories but signed the Association in 1696.

== Death ==
He died on 16 January 1718, at the age of 57 and was buried at Stogursey. He was succeeded by his eldest son, Thomas as MP for Bridgwater from 1715 till 1734.
