= HMS Mediator (1782) =

Roebuck-class warship of the Royal Navy

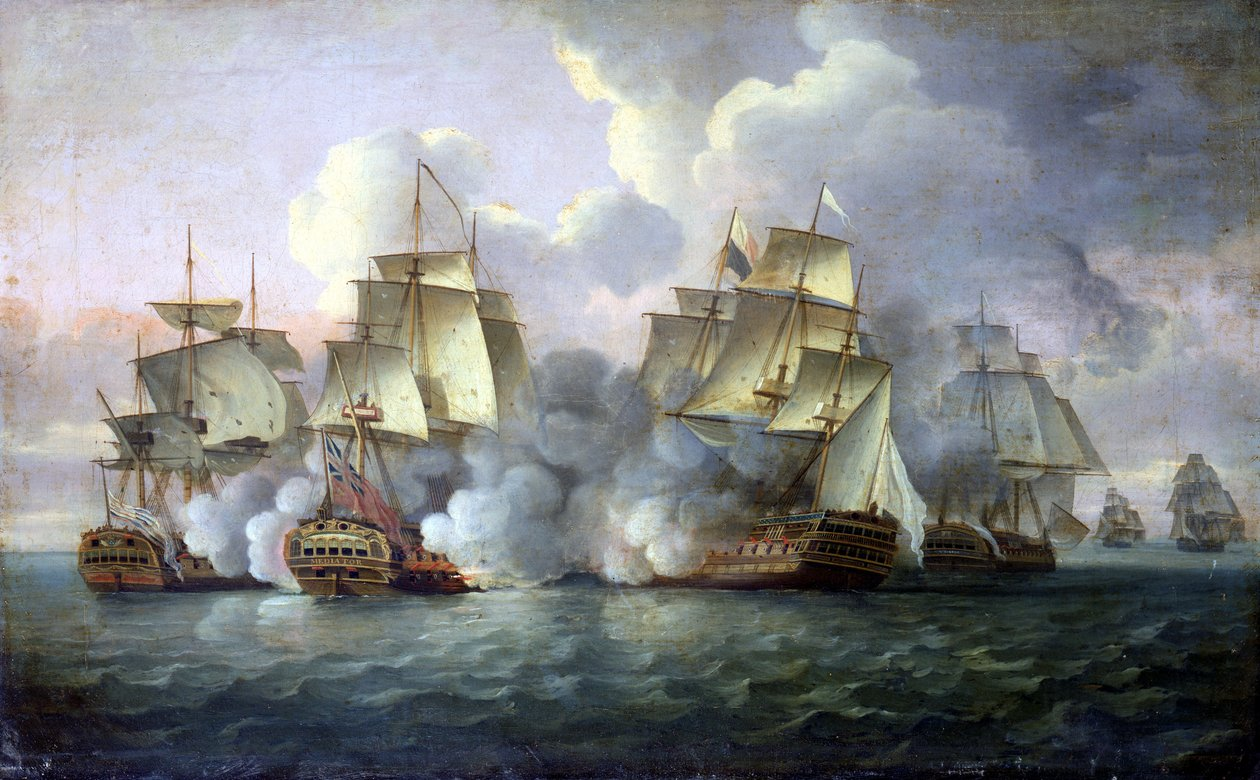
- Mediator (second from left) at the action of 12 December 1782

History

Great Britain
- Name: HMS Mediator
- Ordered: 3 December 1779
- Builder: Thomas Raymond, Northam
- Laid down: July 1780
- Launched: 30 March 1782
- Completed: By June 1782
- Renamed: Camel on 3 March 1788
- Reclassified: Storeship from 1788
- Fate: Broken up in December 1810

General characteristics
- Class & type: Roebuck-class 44-gun fifth rate
- Tons burthen: 887 53/94 bm
- Length: 140 ft (43 m) (gundeck); 115 ft 9.75 in (35.2997 m) (keel)
- Beam: 37 ft 11.5 in (11.570 m)
- Depth of hold: 16 ft 5 in (5.00 m)
- Sail plan: Full-rigged ship
- Complement: 300
- Armament: As fifth rate 44 guns: Lower gundeck: 20 × 18-pounder guns; Upper gundeck: 22 × 9-pounder guns; Forecastle: 2 × 6-pounder guns; As storeship 24 guns; Upper gundeck: 20 × 9-pounder guns; Quarterdeck: 4 × 6-pounder guns

HMS Mediator was a 44-gun Roebuck-class fifth-rate warship of the Royal Navy. She was built and served during the American War of Independence, but was reduced to a storeship and renamed HMS Camel in 1788. She spent the French Revolutionary and part of the Napoleonic Wars in this capacity before being broken up in 1810.

Built as the revival of a design that had fallen out of favour as naval architecture developed, Mediator was intended to operate in the shallow waters of the North American coastline. Her first significant action was fought off the European coastline however, when her captain, James Luttrell attacked and defeated an American and French convoy off Ferrol, taking two ships as prizes. Resisting an attempt by his prisoners to seize his ship, Luttrell returned home to public applause and praise from King George III. Mediator's next commander, Cuthbert Collingwood, was a close friend of Horatio Nelson, and served with him in the West Indies. There he helped Nelson to enforce the Navigation Acts, causing controversy with the local civil and naval authorities. In 1788 she left front-line service for good, and was converted into a storeship, being renamed Camel.

Camel saw important service in the French Revolutionary Wars, making several voyages to the fleets in the Mediterranean and serving under several officers who would becoming prominent in the navy. She also made trips further afield, returning to the West Indies on occasion, as well as making voyages to the Cape of Good Hope to deliver supplies to the armies there. While making one such trip, she was attacked at anchor by a powerful French frigate. Her crew, together with that of a sloop also anchored in the bay, mounted a strong defence, and despite being damaged, forced the French ship to withdraw. She spent her last days making voyages to the various hotspots around the globe, before being finally withdrawn from service and broken up in 1810.

== Design and construction ==
Small two-decked warships, usually classed as fourth rates had largely fallen out of favour by the second half of the eighteenth century, and by the end of the century even the smaller third rates of 64 guns were being phased out. The American War of Independence led to a revival in the concept of the smaller two decked designs, as their shallow draught but comparably heavy armament compared to frigates, made them suitable for coastal warfare in the shallow waters of the North American coastline. The Roebuck class was a revival of a 1769 design by Sir Thomas Slade, with nineteen ships ordered to the design during the war, and classed as fifth rates, but not as frigates, as they carried their main armament on two decks, rather than one. Mediator was ordered from the commercial shipbuilder Thomas Raymond, of Northam, on 3 December 1779. She was laid down there in July 1780 and was launched on 30 March 1782.

Mediator was then taken into Portsmouth Dockyard on 7 April that year for fitting out and having her bottom copper sheathed. The work was completed by 15 June, Mediator having cost £12,133.4.5d to build, with a further £137.15.1d spent on extra works, which together with the costs for fitting her for service came to a total of £22,412.12.0d. She was commissioned in April under the command of Captain James Luttrell.^{[a]}

== American War of Independence ==
=== Convoy action ===
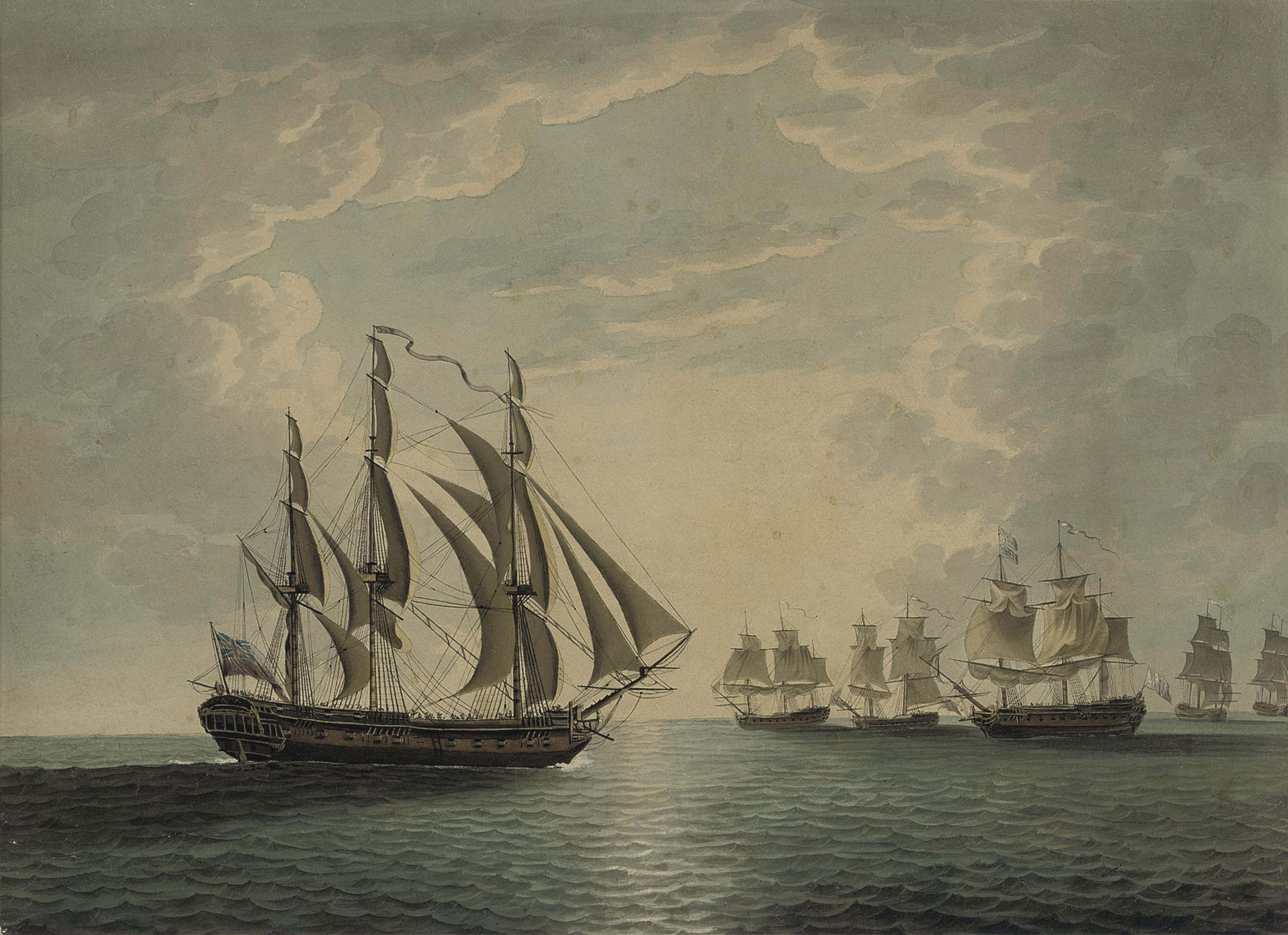
Mediator about to attack the Franco-American convoy off Cape Ortegal, 12 December 1782

On 12 December Luttrell was cruising off Ferrol when a convoy of five sails was sighted, which stood to when Luttrell approached and formed a line of battle. The force consisted of several American and French privateer frigates, storeships and transport vessels under the command of Nicolas Baudin, intending to deliver reinforcements and supplies to America. Baudin, commanding from the 36-gun Aimable Eugénie, had at his disposal the former 64-gun ship Ménagère, now armed en flute and mounting 34-guns, the Dauphin Royal of 28 guns, and two American vessels, the 24-gun Alexander under Stephen Gregory, and the 14-gun brig American. Together the five ships had nearly 600 men and considerably more guns than the Mediator. Luttrell closed the ships, and exchanged fire with them, eventually breaking their line and forcing them to flee. Luttrell then cut off the Alexander and forced her to surrender, before pursuing the remaining ships. By the evening he had caught up with the Ménagère and after an exchange of fire, forced her to surrender.

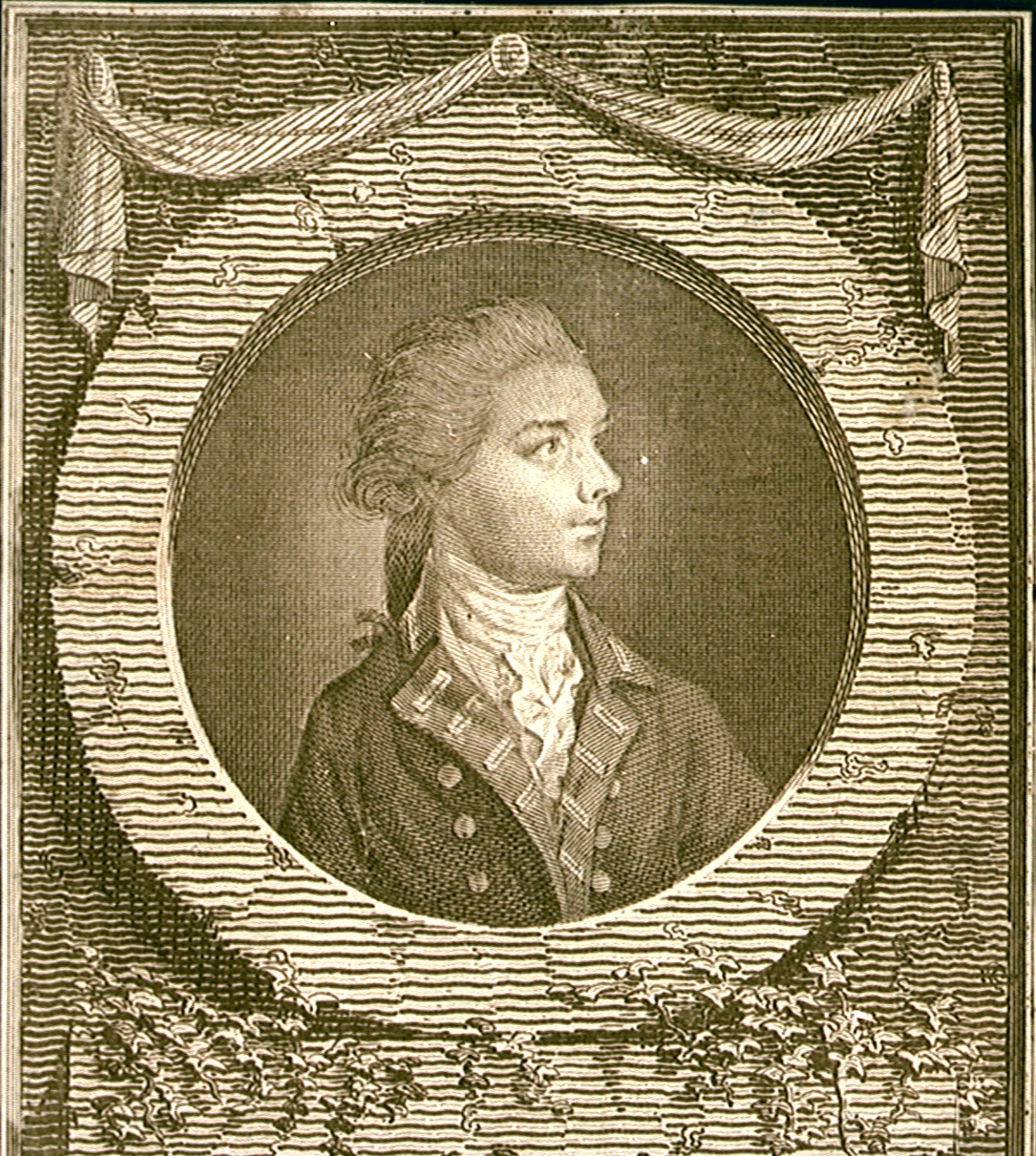
Captain James Luttrell, commander of Mediator at the action of 12 December 1782, and commended by King George III for his skill and bravery.

The surviving ships were still in sight on the morning of 13 December, but Luttrell had a large number of prisoners to guard, and with the hostile Spanish coast nearby, decided to head for a British port with his prizes. He had taken 340 prisoners, and only had 190 men to guard them. Six men had been killed and four wounded on Alexander, while Ménagère had four killed and eight wounded. There were no casualties on Mediator, their opponents having been aiming at their masts and rigging in an attempt to disable the British ship. The captured prisoners made an attempt to seize the Mediator during the voyage to Britain, but prompt action by the ship's officers quashed the rising without bloodshed. Captain Gregory was shown to be the main instigator of the plot, and he and several accomplices were placed in irons for the remainder of the voyage. Luttrell was later praised by King George III, who wrote to Lord Keppel, the First Lord of the Admiralty, that "The skill as well as bravery shown by Captain Luttrell ... deserve much approbation." Marine artists Thomas Luny and Dominic Serres created depictions of Mediator attacking the convoy. Luttrell remained in command towards the end of the American War of Independence, until May 1783 when Captain Cuthbert Collingwood succeeded him. Collingwood spent the next three years as Mediator's captain.

=== Collingwood and the peace ===
Collingwood, a close naval friend of Horatio Nelson, had previously commanded the 64-gun HMS Sampson. He received orders to go out to the West Indies, there to protect British interests in the Caribbean and to enforce the Navigation Acts which now applied to American ships trading with British colonies. Collingwood sailed in late September for Antigua, carrying John Moutray, the new commissioner for English Harbour, and his wife Mary. Also aboard his ship as Collingwood's servant was Jeffrey Raigersfeld, the son of Baron Raigersfeld, the secretary and chargé d'affaires to the Austrian ambassador to London.^{[b]} Collingwood was joined by Nelson, now commanding the 28-gun HMS Boreas in July 1784, with Nelson becoming the senior officer on the station.^{[c]} Together with Collingwood's younger brother Wilfred, who had arrived on the station in command of the 14-gun sloop HMS Rattler, the officers decided to take a firm stance on implementing the Navigation Acts, despite the apparent unwillingness to do so by the more senior officers, such as Moutray, the station's commander Admiral Sir Richard Hughes, and the Governor of the Leeward Islands, Thomas Shirley. Hughes and Shirley were both making money from the trade.

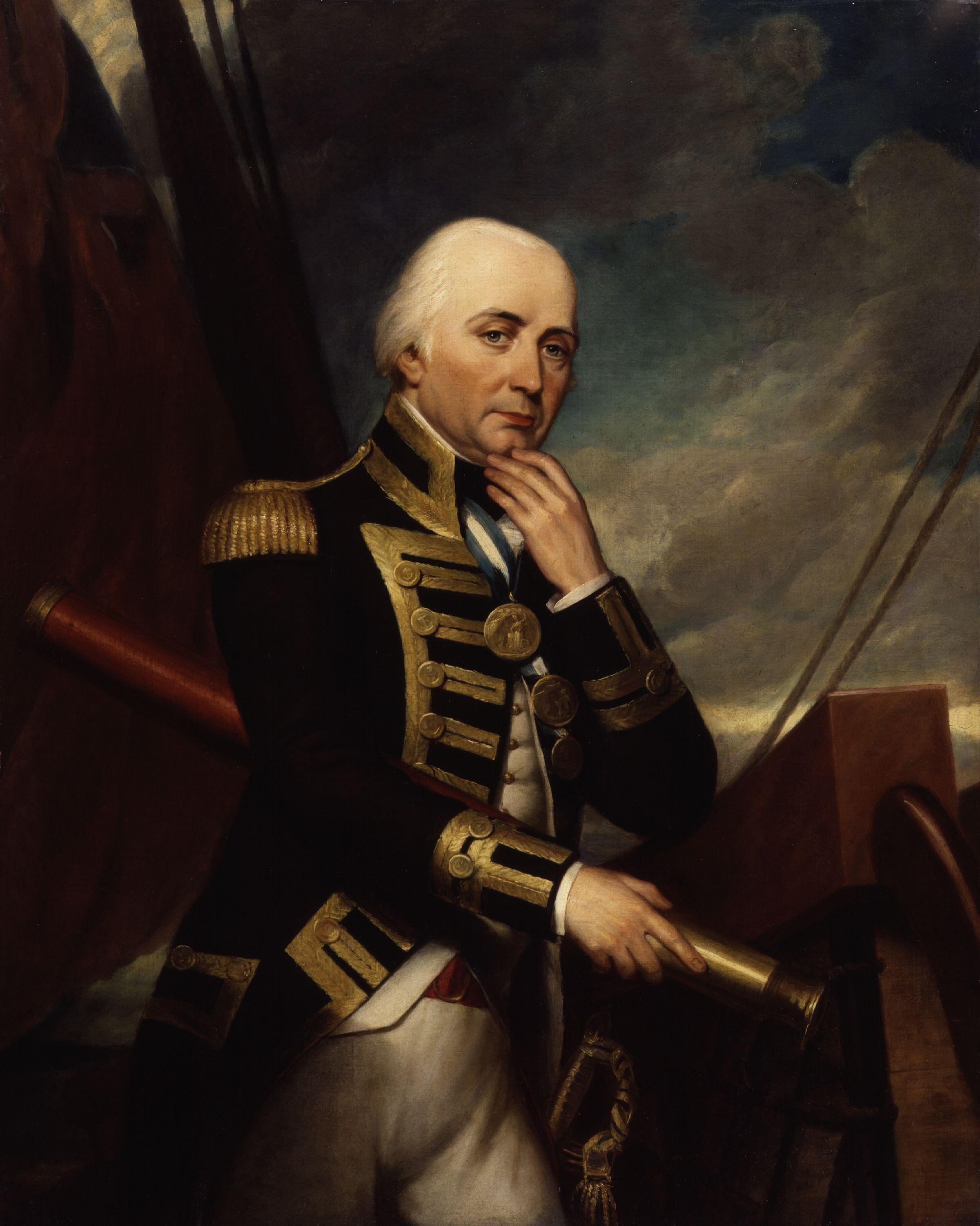
Cuthbert Collingwood, depicted by Henry Howard. Collingwood commanded Mediator in the West Indies, serving with his friend and colleague Horatio Nelson.

Matters came to a head on 15 December 1784 when Collingwood ordered an American merchant vessel to be detained as it approached St. John's. The American master complained to Shirley, who referred the matter to the island's attorney-general. Collingwood held firm in his enforcement of the acts, and the matter was eventually passed on to Admiral Hughes. Hughes ordered a compromise. The arrival of foreign vessels was to be reported, but only acted on if the governor so ordered. Given Shirley's reluctance to do so, the compromise was unsatisfactory to Nelson and the brothers Collingwood. Collingwood continued to use Mediator to intercept foreign trade, seizing the Lovely Ann, flying an Irish flag, in February, and an American brig named Dolphin in June 1785. Incensed, the merchants of the island threatened Collingwood and Nelson with writs for wrongful seizure, and both were pursued by lawyers for a time.

Mediator sailed for Barbados towards the end of the 1785 hurricane season, but was becalmed off La Désirade for a night. The following day she was struck by a sudden squall that laid her on her beam ends. Further damage occurred when

A terrible crash took part in the fore part of the ship, accompanied by a tremendous explosion and stench of sulphur, deep groans followed, – sixteen men upon the main deck were knocked down, some were apparently dead and others groaning; relief was instantly afforded, and in about four hours after all were apparently well again. A lightning ball had struck the fore topmast, passed into the pigsty, and through the galley into the waist, where it burst and overthrew seventeen men; eleven pigs in the sty before the mast were killed, belonging to the Captain; the silver buckles in the shoes of the gunner were melted into wire, and himself was knocked out of the roundhouse forward.

Despite the dramatic nature of the lightning strike, no one was killed, except for the pigs, which Collingwood gave to the crew as a reward for their work in repairing the foremast. Collingwood took Mediator back to English Harbour to be careened in early 1786, and then returned to England to be paid off in August 1786.

== Storeship ==
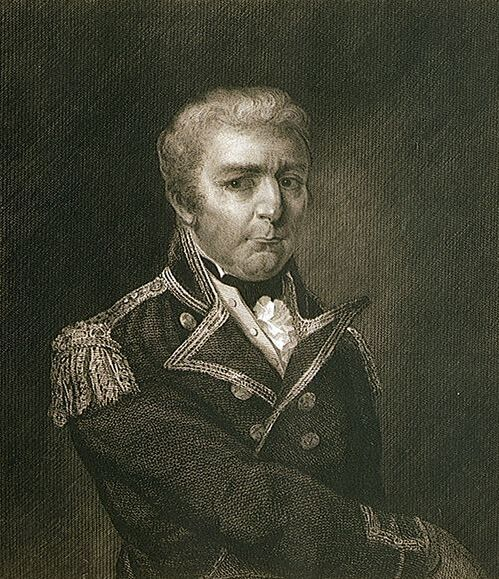
Edward Rotheram, who commanded Camel briefly during her time as storeship in the Mediterranean. Rotheram would later serve as Cuthbert Collingwood's flag captain at the Battle of Trafalgar in 1805.

This marked the end of Mediator's role as a front-line fighting ship. The Admiralty made the decision in an order dated 19 December 1787 to have her undergo a large repair and refit to repurpose her as a storeship. Her sister ship HMS Janus was also chosen to undergo the same process. Mediator was refitted between January 1788 and July 1789 for the sum of £11,658. Both her and Janus were renamed on 3 March 1788 to fit their latest role, with Mediator being renamed Camel and Janus being renamed Dromedary. The guns on Camel's lower gundeck were removed, leaving her with twenty 9-pounder guns on her upper deck; four 6-pounder guns were fitted onto her quarterdeck.

Camel did not return immediately to service, but was briefly recommissioned during the Russian Armament in April 1791, under Commander Charles Patton. When the period of tension passed without breaking into open war, Camel was paid off in September that year. The outbreak of the French Revolutionary Wars was the next opportunity for active service, and Camel was recommissioned in February 1793 under Commander Benjamin Hallowell, who took her out to the Mediterranean in May that year to join the fleet under Admiral Lord Hood. Hallowell was promoted to post-captain on 30 August 1793, shortly after his arrival, and became acting captain of the 74-gun HMS Robust. Camel remained in the Mediterranean until her return to England in April 1794, at which time Commander Joseph Short became her captain. Short's command lasted from May 1794 until January 1795, with Commander Edward Rotheram taking over on 27 January 1795.

Camel was at Plymouth on 20 January 1795 and so shared in the proceeds of the detention of the Dutch naval vessels, East Indiamen, and other merchant vessels that were in port on the outbreak of war between Britain and the Netherlands.

Rotheram sailed Camel back to the Mediterranean in February, and after serving with the fleet on this station, was back in England by summer the following year. Commander William Haggit replaced Rotheram at Woolwich in July 1796, though was in turn superseded by Commander Thomas Caulfield in November that year, as Camel returned for another stint in the Mediterranean.

Commander John Lee was captain of Camel by July 1797, during which time she was serving on the Lisbon station. She returned to England in June 1798, after which she made two voyages to the Cape of Good Hope, the first in October 1798 and the second in May 1799.

=== Battling Preneuse ===
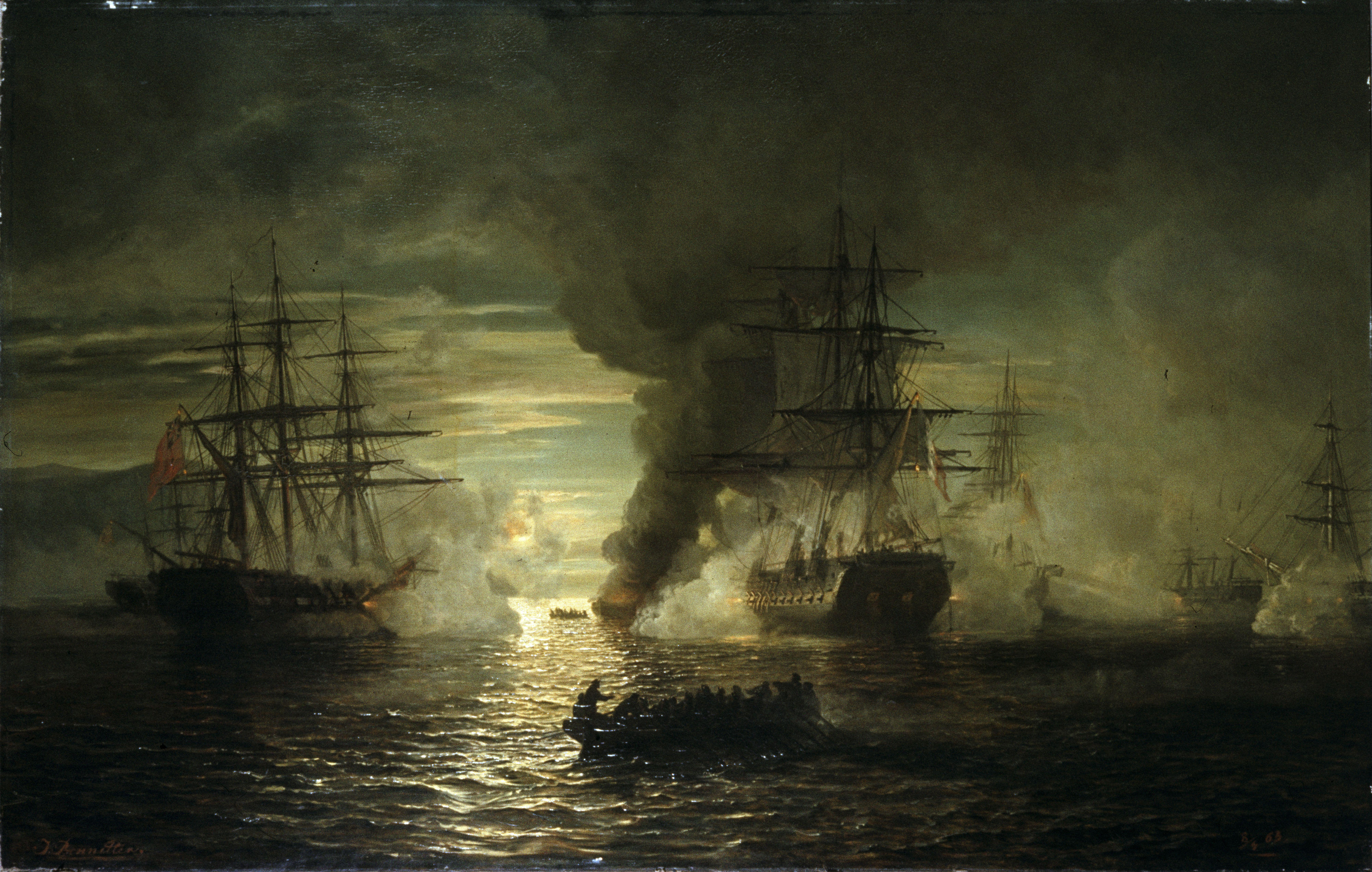
The Seabattle at the Lagoa Bay in 1799 (Johan Jacob Bennetter, 1863)

Camel had been used to carry stores and supplies to the Cape for the use of the army under General Francis Dundas, which was fighting the Third Frontier War. On 20 September she was anchored in Algoa Bay with the 16-gun sloop HMS Rattlesnake. Both captains, Lee of Camel and Samuel Gooch of Rattlesnake, were onshore with a number of their men, supporting the army. At 4 pm a strange sail was seen approaching the bay, flying the Danish flag. The ship entered the bay and approached the British ships, whereupon it was approached by a guard boat from Camel, who planned to board her. As they approached, the British sailors saw armed men aboard and realised the ship was a large frigate; they immediately returned to Camel. A British privateer schooner, Surprise, had also passed by the strange ship, and discovered she was a French frigate. Surprise sailed for Rattlesnake to report this. With Lee and Gooch ashore, command devolved to First Lieutenant William Fothergill of Rattlesnake. After warning shots fired from both Camel and Rattlesnake elicited no response, both ships prepared for action. By 8.30 pm the French frigate, which was the 40-gun Preneuse under Captain Jean-Marthe-Adrien l'Hermite, had manoeuvred close to Rattlesnake. Fothergill fired a broadside at her, supported by Camel, and a general action broke out. The ships exchanged fire for over three hours, with Preneuse concentrating her fire on Camel, until having sustained a shot below the waterline and having six feet of water in the hold, Camel's crew were forced to abandon the guns to work the pumps.

Preneuse then turned her attention to Rattlesnake, and a fierce cannonade was exchanged until 3.30 am on the morning of 21 September, when Preneuse stopped firing and bore away, to the surprise of the British. She then left the bay and sailed away, ending the engagement. Both Camel and Rattlesnake had sustained damage to their masts, sails and rigging, and had several holes in their hulls. Casualties were comparatively light however, with six men wounded on Camel and two men killed, one man mortally wounded and six or seven slightly wounded on Rattlesnake. Both Lee and Gooch had made several attempts to return to their ship, but were unable to launch their boats due to the raging surf on the beach. Seeing Preneuse bear away apparently damaged, Lee sent news of the attack on to Table Bay. The 54-gun HMS Jupiter put to sea to intercept the French ship, but Preneuse was able to repel her after bad weather prevented Jupiter from outmaneuvering Preneuse. The 74-gun HMS Tremendous and the 50-gun HMS Adamant finally caught up with Preneuse on 11 December 1799, driving her ashore and causing her destruction.

== Later service ==
Camel returned to England in August 1800, with Commander Matthew Buckle becoming her new captain in December that year. She went out to the West Indies in April 1801, returning to England in February the following year. She was paid off in September 1802 and spent the Peace of Amiens laid up. With the outbreak of the Napoleonic Wars, Camel was recommissioned under Commander John Ayscough in June 1803 and returned to the West Indies later that year. She was back in England in April 1804, with Ayscough superseded by Commander Thomas Garth in May. Camel was initially based in the North Sea until November 1804, when she sailed to the Mediterranean. She returned in June 1805, and was under Commander John Joyce from October that year. Camel recommissioned in May 1808 under sailing master Duncan Weir, and returned to the Cape of Good Hope. She was back supporting military efforts on land at the Battle of Corunna in 1809. She was removed from service shortly afterwards and was broken up at Deptford in December 1810, after 28 years of service.

== Notes ==
a. Winfield's British Warships in the Age of Sail has "Capt. John Luttrell" instead, confusing James Luttrell with his elder brother John, later third Earl of Carhampton. This is a common occurrence according to J. K. Laughton in the Dictionary of National Biography.

b. The post on Mediator was the start of a long career in the navy for Jeffrey Raigersfeld. After service as a young lieutenant aboard HMS Speedy some years before she won fame under Lord Cochrane, Raigersfeld rose eventually to be a rear-admiral, albeit as a yellow admiral. He also wrote his autobiography, entitled The Life of a Sea Officer, which includes details of his time on Mediator.

c. Nelson was soon involved in a quarrel with Moutray over rank and privilege. Moutray was the more senior post-captain at English Harbour, but was on half-pay. When Moutray raised a commodore's broad pennant aboard HMS Latona, Nelson ordered him to strike it.

== Bibliographies ==
- Tugdual de Langlais, L'armateur préféré de Beaumarchais Jean Peltier Dudoyer, de Nantes à l'Isle de France, Éd. Coiffard, 2015, 340 p. (ISBN 9782919339280). pp. 163–170.
