= Nicholas Tomlinson (Royal Navy officer) =

British Royal Navy vice admiral

Vice-Admiral Nicholas Tomlinson
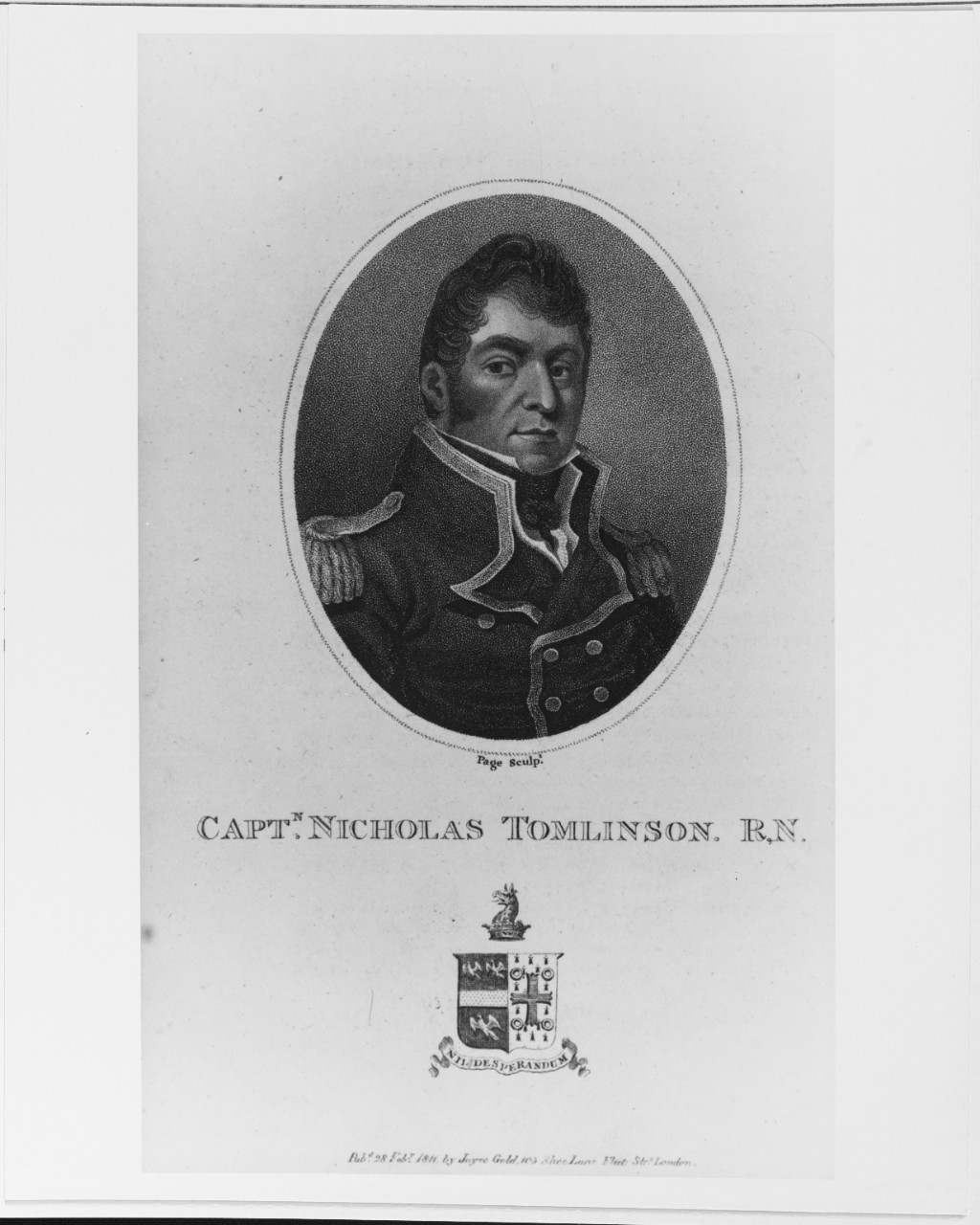
- Born: 1765
- Died: 6 March 1847 (aged 81–82)
- Occupation: Royal Navy vice-admiral

Nicholas Tomlinson (1765 – 6 March 1847) was a British Royal Navy vice-admiral.

== Biography ==
Tomlinson was born in 1765. He was the third son of Captain Robert Tomlinson of the navy, was from March 1772 borne on the books of the Resolution, guardship at Chatham, of which his father was first lieutenant. He is said to have afterwards made two voyages to St. Helena in the Thetis, and in her to have been also on the North American station. In March 1779 he joined the Charon, with Captain John Luttrell, third earl of Carhampton; served as Luttrell's aide-de-camp in the reduction of Omoa; and, continuing in her with Captain Thomas Symonds, was present at the capture of the French privateer Comte d'Artois, and the defence and capitulation of Yorktown. He returned to England in a cartel in December 1781, and on 23 March 1782 was made lieutenant into the Bristol, which went out with convoy to the East Indies. In April 1783, shortly after the Bristol's arrival at Madras, Tomlinson was in command of a working party on board the Duke of Athol, Indiaman, when she was blown up and upwards of two hundred men and officers killed. Tomlinson escaped with his life, but was severely injured. In the Bristol he was present in the fifth action between Pierre André de Suffren and Sir Edward Hughes; in September 1784 he was appointed to the Juno, and in her returned to England in 1785. From 1786 to 1789 he served in the Savage sloop on the coast of Scotland. He is said to have been then, for a few years, in the Russian navy, and to have had command of a Russian ship of the line, which he resigned on the imminence of the war between England and France in the beginning of 1793. In July he was appointed to the Regulus, which ill-health compelled him to leave after a few months. In July 1794 he was appointed to command the Pelter gunboat, in which he ‘performed a variety of dashing exploits,’ capturing or destroying numerous vessels along the French coast, even under the protection of batteries. In July 1795 he was publicly thanked by Sir John Borlase Warren on the quarterdeck of the Pomone for his service in rescuing a party of French royalists after the failure of the attempt at Quiberon.

On 30 November 1795 he was promoted to the command of the Suffisante sloop, in which, in the following May, he captured the French national brig Revanche; and through the summer took or destroyed several privateers, armed vessels, storeships, and traders—a season of remarkable activity and success. The ‘Committee for Encouraging the Capture of French Privateers’ voted him a piece of plate value 50l.; so also did the ‘Court of Directors of the Royal Exchange Assurance;’ and on 12 December 1796 he was advanced to post rank. In the following year, being unable to get employment from the admiralty, he fitted out a privateer, in which he made several rich prizes; but being reported to the admiralty as having used the private signals to avoid being overhauled by ships of war, his name was summarily struck off the list on 20 November 1798. In 1801 he was permitted to serve as a volunteer in the fleet going to the Baltic with Sir Hyde Parker, and, being favourably reported on by him, was restored to his rank in the navy, with seniority, 22 September 1801.

From July 1803 to June 1809 he commanded the Sea Fencibles on the coast of Essex; in the summer of 1809 he fitted out and commanded a division of fireships for the operations in the Scheldt. On returning to England he resumed the command of the Fencibles till they were broken up early in 1810. He had no further employment, but was put on the retired list of rear-admirals on 22 July 1830. He was transferred to the active list on 17 August 1840, and was promoted to be vice-admiral on 23 November 1841. He died at his house near Lewes on 6 March 1847. He married, in 1794, Elizabeth, second daughter and coheiress of Ralph Ward of Forburrows, near Colchester, and had a large family.

Two of Tomlinson's brothers also served in the navy, and retired with the rank of commander after the war. Philip died in 1839; Robert, at the age of eighty-five, in 1844. Each of the three brothers attained the grade of lieutenant in 1782.
