= John Luttrell-Olmius, 3rd Earl of Carhampton =

Irish naval commander and politician

Captain John Luttrell-Olmius, 3rd Earl of Carhampton (11 December 1739 – 19 March 1829), styled The Honourable John Luttrell between 1768 and 1787 and as The Honourable John Luttrell-Olmius between 1787 and 1829, was a Royal Navy officer and politician who sat in the House of Commons of Great Britain between 1774 and 1785.

== Background ==
Born John Luttrell, he was the second son of Simon Luttrell, 1st Earl of Carhampton by Judith Maria Lawes, daughter of Sir Nicholas Lawes, Governor of Jamaica. He was the grandson of Colonel Henry Luttrell and the brother of Henry Luttrell, 2nd Earl of Carhampton, James Luttrell, and Lady Anne Luttrell, Duchess of Cumberland and Strathearn. He was a member of the Irish branch of the ancient family of Luttrell and a descendant of Sir Geoffrey de Luterel, who established Luttrellstown Castle, County Dublin in the early 13th century.

== Naval and political career ==
Luttrell was a captain in the Royal Navy but retired in 1789. He was returned to Parliament for Stockbridge in 1774, a seat he held until 1775, and again between 1780 and 1785. Between 1785 and 1826 he was a commissioner of HM Customs and Excise. He succeeded his elder brother to the earldom in 1821. This was an Irish peerage and did not entitle him to an automatic seat in the House of Lords.

== Family ==
In 1766 Lord Carhampton married the Honorable Elizabeth Olmius, 1742-1797, daughter of John Olmius, 1st Baron Waltham. In 1787, out of respect after the death of his father-in-law, he assumed by Royal Licence the additional surname of 'Olmius'. In 1798 he sold the Olmius family seat of New Hall to the founding nuns of New Hall School. There were three children from Lord Carhampton's first marriage (however only his daughter would survive to adulthood):

- Lady Frances Maria Luttrell (b. 1768), married Sir Simeon Stuart, 4th Baronet (Stuart baronets).
- James Luttrell (d. 1772).
- John Luttrell (d. 1769).

He married secondly Maria Morgan, daughter of John Morgan, in 1798. They had one child:

- Lady Maria Anne Luttrell (1799–1857), married Lieutenant-Colonel Hardress Robert Saunderson.

Lord Carhampton died in March 1829, aged 89, at which time the Earldom became extinct.

Parliament of Great Britain
Preceded by Richard Fuller; James Hare	Member of Parliament for Stockbridge; 1774–1775; With: The Lord Irnham	Succeeded by The Lord Irnham; Hon. James Luttrell
Preceded by The Lord Irnham; Hon. James Luttrell	Member of Parliament for Stockbridge; 1780–1785; With: Hon. James Luttrell 1780–1784; Thomas Parkyns 1784–1785	Succeeded by Thomas Parkyns; James Gordon
Peerage of Ireland
Preceded by Henry Luttrell	Earl of Carhampton; 1821–1829	Extinct
