= James Luttrell =

Royal Navy officer and politician

Captain James Luttrell
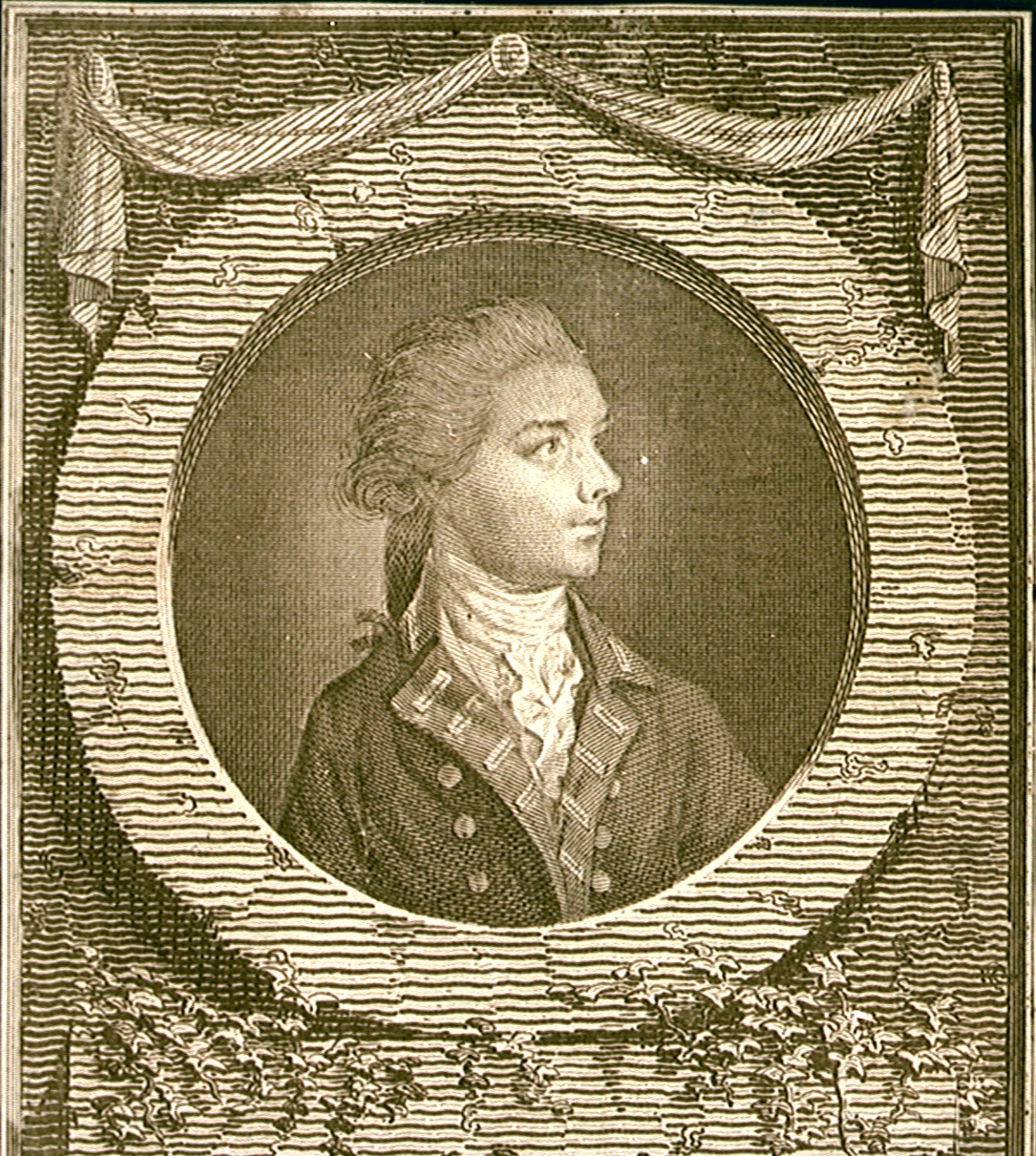
- Born: c. 1751; Four Oaks, Warwickshire
- Died: 23 December 1788 (aged 36–37)
- Relatives: Simon Luttrell, 1st Earl of Carhampton (father)
- Military career
- Allegiance: Great Britain
- Branch: Royal Navy
- Service years: – 1788
- Rank: Captain
- Commands: HMS Merlin; HMS Portland; HMS Mediator; HMS Ganges
- Conflicts: American War of Independence; Action of 12 December 1782

James Luttrell (c. 1751 – 23 December 1788) was a Royal Navy officer and politician who represented Stockbridge and Dover in the House of Commons of Great Britain from 1775 to 1788. Born into a prominent political family, the younger son of an earl, James Luttrell combined a career in politics with naval service, following in the footsteps of an elder brother. He was promoted to lieutenant in 1770, and entered parliament in 1775. From then on, his careers were intertwined.

He served off the North American coast during the American War of Independence, having some success against privateers and enemy shipping. He used his parliamentary platform however to oppose the war against the Americans, considering it unjust, but supported strong efforts against the American's French and Spanish allies. His political connections ensured his rise through the ranks and he commanded several warships during his career.

Luttrell won particular fame after an action he fought in late 1782, when his ship engaged a powerful convoy of American and French ships and defeated it, capturing two of the vessels and taking them as prizes. King George III commented on his skill and bravery during the fight. Luttrell saw little active service afloat after the end of the American War of Independence, but resumed his political career, voting mainly in the government interest. He was appointed to the post of Surveyor-General of the Ordnance, holding it along with his parliamentary seat until his death at a relatively young age in 1788.

== Family and early life ==
Luttrell was born at Four Oaks, Warwickshire c. 1751, the youngest surviving son of Simon Luttrell, 1st Earl of Carhampton and his wife, Judith Maria Lawes. The Luttrells were a significant political family, with James's father sitting as member of parliament for several constituencies, and his brothers Henry, John and Temple Simon all sitting in parliament, while Henry and John in turn inherited their father's earldom. Like his older brother John, James embarked on a career in the navy, and after a period of service was promoted to the rank of lieutenant on 2 February 1770.

== Parliamentary career and command ==
While pursuing his naval career, Luttrell also took the opportunity to follow his father and older brothers into politics. His brother John had held the seat of Stockbridge with his father, but vacated it in 1775 for James. James contested and won the seat at the by-election on 16 December 1775. He followed his family's stance in opposing the war which broke out with the American colonies, and promoted reconciliation, arguing that "I cannot agree to vote away the lives and properties of my fellow subjects, merely for the purpose of enriching and aggrandising a few favourites and flatterers placed near the throne." He nevertheless supported strong war measures against France and Spain when they entered the war on the American side. Luttrell's father, by now created Lord Irnham, negotiated advancement in the navy for his son, in exchange for political support, but his desire to be advanced to captain clashed with the First Lord of the Admiralty, Lord Sandwich, who argued that a post-captaincy in home waters was "utterly impractical", but offered instead a recommendation to the commander in chief on one of the foreign stations.

Sandwich communicated this to Luttrell's fellow MP John Robinson, who advised Luttrell to undertake a cruise, and in late July 1780 Luttrell was appointed first lieutenant of the 64-gun HMS Belliqueux. Robinson informed Luttrell that Sandwich had promised to keep the Belliqueux in home waters, and would arrange for him to be promoted to master and commander at the first opportunity. Luttrell did not have to wait long for this, he had been appointed commander by 20 October 1780, when he was given command of the 18-gun sloop HMS Merlin for service in the Downs. His service at this rank did not last long, as he was advanced to post-captain on 23 February and on 28 February 1781 was appointed to command the 50-gun HMS Portland. Luttrell took Portland out to Newfoundland in May that year and was active against French and American privateers and warships. In company with HMS Venus he captured two French ships, the 16-gun Royal Louis and 10-gun Lion on 12 July 1781, and followed this success up capturing, in company with HMS Aeolus and HMS Vestal, the 16-gun Disdain and 6-gun Captain. He left Portland after his appointment on 16 March 1782 to take command of the 44-gun HMS Mediator.

=== Convoy battle ===
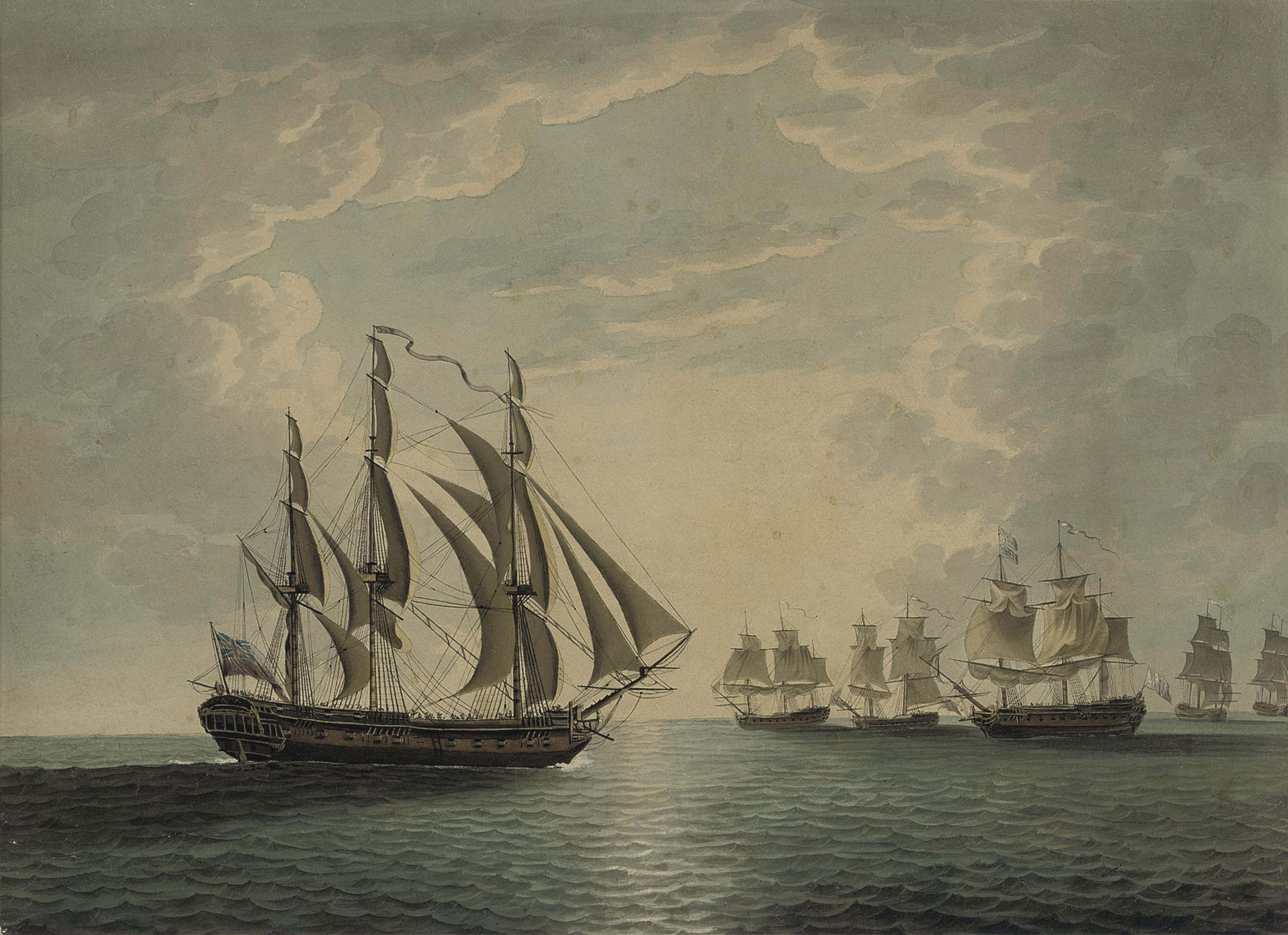
H.M.S. Mediator about to attack an enemy convoy off Cape Ortegal, 12th December 1782, Robert Cleveley

On 12 December, Luttrell was cruising off Ferrol when a convoy of five sails was sighted, which stood to when Luttrell approached and formed a line of battle. The force consisted of several American and French privateer frigates, storeships and transport vessels under the command of Nicolas Baudin, intending to deliver reinforcements and supplies to America. Baudin, commanding from the 36-gun Aimable Eugénie, had at his disposal the former 64-gun ship Ménagère, now armed en flute and mounting 34-guns, the Dauphin Royal of 28 guns, and two American vessels, the 24-gun Alexander under Stephen Gregory, and the 14-gun brig American. Together the five ships had nearly 600 men and considerably more guns than the Mediator. Luttrell closed the ships, and exchanged fire with them, eventually breaking their line and forcing them to flee. Luttrell then cut off the Alexander and forced her to surrender, before pursuing the remaining ships. By the evening he had caught up with the Ménagère and after an exchange of fire, forced her to surrender.

The surviving ships were still in sight on the morning of 13 December, but Luttrell had a large number of prisoners to guard, and with the hostile Spanish coast nearby, decided to head for a British port with his prizes. He had taken 340 prisoners, and only had 190 men to guard them. Six men had been killed and four wounded on Alexander, while Ménagère had four killed and eight wounded. There were no casualties on Mediator, their opponents having been aiming at their masts and rigging in an attempt to disable the British ship. The captured prisoners made an attempt to seize the Mediator during the voyage to Britain, but prompt action by the ship's officers quashed the rising without bloodshed. Captain Gregory was shown to be the main instigator of the plot, and he and several accomplices were placed in irons for the remainder of the voyage.

The capture of the heavily armed and manned convoy was greeted with considerable applause back in Britain. Marine artist Thomas Luny painted a depiction of the action, while Dominic Serres produced several views of the battle. King George III wrote to Lord Keppel, the First Lord of the Admiralty, that "The skill as well as bravery shown by Captain Luttrell ... deserve much approbation."

== Later career ==
Following his success as captain of the Mediator, Luttrell was moved to command the 74-gun HMS Ganges in April 1783, Ganges then serving as the guard ship at Portsmouth. He continued to be active in parliament as the American War of Independence drew to a close, likely supporting the Shelburne Ministry's peace proposals, and launching an attack on Sandwich, blaming him for having failed to prepare the navy adequately for the war, and for having mismanaged it during it. He played a less prominent role in the Pitt administration, usually avoiding party questions but supporting independents. He was appointed Surveyor-General of the Ordnance in early 1784, King George writing to Prime Minister William Pitt the Younger on 30 March 1784 that "Mr. James Luttrell I have always understood to be the best of that strange family, I have therefore signed the appointment of him as surveyor of the Ordnance."

James Luttrell left his Stockbridge seat at the 1784 election to contest Dover, which he won with government support. He sat for Dover, voting for the government interest, while holding his post as Surveyor-General of the Ordnance, until his death on 23 December 1788 from consumption.

== Citations ==
Parliament of Great Britain
Preceded by John Luttrell; The Lord Irnham	Member of Parliament for Stockbridge; 1775–1784; With: The Lord Irnham 1775–80; John Luttrell 1780–84	Succeeded by Thomas Parkyns; John Luttrell
Preceded by John Henniker; John Trevanion	Member of Parliament for Dover; 1784–1788; With: Robert Preston	Succeeded by Robert Preston; John Trevanion
Military offices
Preceded by John Courtenay	Surveyor-General of the Ordnance; 1784–1788	Succeeded by George Cranfield Berkeley
