= Henry Luttrell, 2nd Earl of Carhampton =

British Army officer and politician (1743–1821)

General the Right Honourable The Earl of Carhampton PC (Ire)
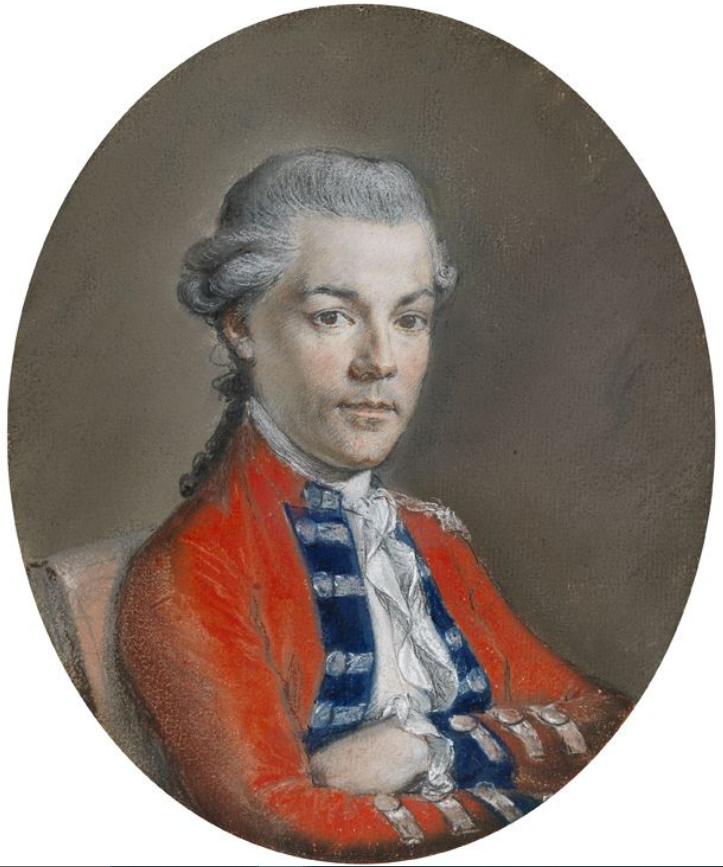
- Portrait by Hugh Douglas Hamilton, c. 1770
- Born: 7 August 1743; Cranford, Middlesex
- Died: 25 April 1821 (aged 77); London, England
- Military career
- Allegiance: Great Britain; United Kingdom
- Branch: British Army
- Service years: 1757–1798
- Rank: General
- Commands: Commander-in-Chief, Ireland
- Conflicts: Seven Years' War; United Irishmen Rebellion

General Henry Lawes Luttrell, 2nd Earl of Carhampton, PC (Ire) (7 August 1743 – 25 April 1821) was a British Army officer and politician, who both in public and private life attracted scandal. He was spurned by colleagues in the British House of Commons who believed that in the election of 1769 he had played an underhand role in denying his seat to the popular choice, the reformer John Wilkes. In 1788 he was publicly accused in Dublin of raping a twelve-year-old girl. Ten years later, his command in the suppression of the Irish Rebellion of 1798 was criticised by fellow officers for its brutality. His last years in Parliament were marked by his opposition to Catholic Emancipation, and to parliamentary reform.

== Early years ==
Luttrell was born in Cranford, Middlesex, the scion of an Anglo-Irish landed family, descendants of Sir Geoffrey de Luterel, who established Luttrellstown Castle, County Dublin, in the early 13th century. His grandfather, Henry Luttrell, had been a pardoned Jacobite commander murdered on the street in Dublin—it was suspected by his former comrades—in 1717. His father, Simon Luttrell, was successively titled Baron Irnham, Viscount Carhampton and Earl Carhampton, all in the Irish peerage. His mother, Maria, was the daughter of Sir Nicholas Lawes 1652-1731, Chief Justice of Jamaica 1698-1703 and Governor of Jamaica 1718-1722, and the eventual heir to a slave plantation Temple Hall on the West Indian island which, on her husband's death in 1787, passed to her son.

Educated at Westminster School and Christ Church, Oxford, Luttrell was commissioned into the 48th Regiment of Foot in 1757. Two years later he became lieutenant of the 34th Regiment of Foot. Father and son, both accounted "notorious womanizers", had a bitter relationship. His father once challenged Luttrell to a duel, but he declined, observing that his father was not a gentleman. Luttrell, described as "strong in body, if not in mind", achieved a reputation for bravery as a soldier during the Seven Years' War, becoming Deputy Adjutant-General of the British Forces in Portugal. In 1768 he became a Tory Member of Parliament in for the village of Bossiney, Cornwall.

== Service to the Tory Ministry against Wilkes ==
With the support of the Grafton ministry and of the Court, in 1769 Luttrell stood in Middlesex against John Wilkes, the radical and popular figure who had already been the constituency's three-time democratic choice. Luttrell lost the poll (1,143 votes to 269) but was seated in Parliament, Wilkes having once again been barred as an adjudged felon. As a result of the affair, for some months, Luttrell dared not appear in the street, and was "the most unpopular man in the House of Commons".

The government rewarded Luttrell by appointing him Adjutant General for Ireland in 1770. He continued to sit in the Commons, where he described the Whigs in their opposition to the conduct of the American War, as "the abetters of treason and rebellion combined purposely for the ruin of their country".

== The case of Mary Neal ==
Luttrell became active in Irish politics and between 1783 and 1787, he sat in the Irish House of Commons for Old Leighlin. He identified with the Ascendancy party led by John Beresford and is recorded as defending, with an "utter contempt for public reputation", their opposition to Catholic relief and parliamentary reform.

On his father's death in 1787, he succeeded to the earldom of Carhampton and other titles. He became Colonel of the 6th Dragoon Guards and Lieutenant-General of the Ordnance in Ireland.

In 1788, Carhampton was publicly accused in Dublin of the rape of a 12-year-old girl. Having been paid to deliver a message, Mary Neal claimed she was bundled into a brothel and there assaulted throughout the night by Carhampton. The keeper of the house, Maria Llewellyn, was charged in a case marked by accusations of witness tampering, the death in prison of Mary's mother and newborn baby sister and by the insinuation that Mary was already working as a prostitute. The affair became a cause célèbre with the public intervention of Archibald Hamilton Rowan (later United Irishman). To clear Mary's name he brought her to Dublin Castle to see the Lord Lieutenant, the Earl of Westmorland. Westmorland, unmoved, pardoned Llewellyn and set her at liberty.

Carhampton was never asked to answer for raping Mary Neal. In 1790 he re-entered the British Parliament as Member for Plympton Erle in Devon.

== Martial-law commander in Ireland ==
In October 1793, a younger brother, Temple Simon Luttrell, was arrested in Boulogne and, until February 1795, was held in Paris where, on the strength of their sister Anne Luttrell being married to Prince Henry, Duke of Cumberland, he was publicly exhibited as the brother of the king of England.

In 1795 Carhampton was entrusted with the breakup and disarming of Defenders, the agrarian semi-insurgency, in Connaught. His proceedings and impressment of some 1,300 "rebels" into the British navy elicited criticism in otherwise loyal circles.

In 1796, with the leaders of the democratic party, the United Irishmen, preparing for a French-assisted insurrection, he was given overall command of the Crown forces in Ireland.

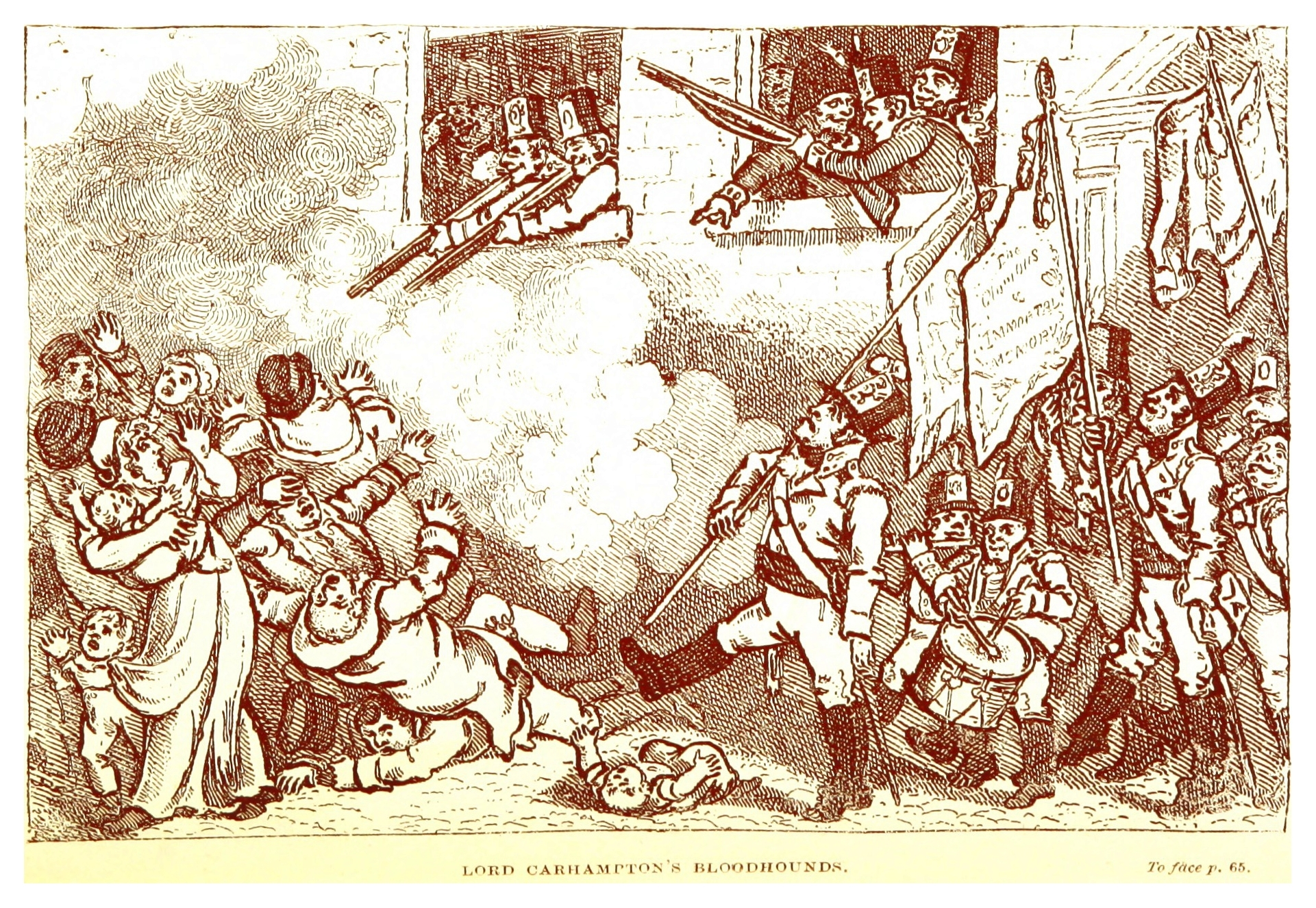
Lord Carhampton's bloodhounds, 1798

He demonstrated still greater ruthlessness in attempting to "pacify" the country and suppress the eventual rising in the summer of 1798. His command had the unusual distinction of being upbraided by his successor as Commander in Chief, Sir Ralph Abercromby for an army "in a state of licentiousness, which must render it formidable to every one but the enemy".

Carhampton was seen by his critics as having "fanned the flame of disaffection into open rebellion" by "the picketings, the free quarters, half hangings, flogging and pitch-cappings" he directed.

== Opponent of reform ==
In 1791 and 1792, Carhampton helped vote down bills to abolish the slave trade. Negroes, he proposed, only wanted "to murder their masters, ravish their women, and drink all their rum". At the same time, he opposed lifting civil disabilities on Roman Catholics by abolishing the Test Act in Scotland, and spoke scathingly of parliamentary reform.

In July 1799 he sold his Irish property and by his own later account, he "took no part" in the Acts of Union. He claimed to be been "disgusted at the scene that was passing before me", and to have abandoned Ireland because, under a "cowardly" government, he saw "the country likely to become Catholic". When the Dublin Post of 2 May 1811 erroneously reported his death, he demanded a retraction which they printed under the headline Public Disappointment.

He purchased an estate at Painshill Park in Surrey and lived for several years in relative obscurity. From 1813 he harried the government of Lord Liverpool with the claim that George III had promised him a secure seat in the Commons. In June 1817, five weeks short of his eightieth birthday, Luttrell found his own way back to Parliament as Member for Ludgershall and revenged himself, in the four years remaining to him, by voting with the opposition. This, however, did not extend to joining in the attacks on the domestic spy system in 1818 nor to voting for parliamentary reform in 1819. Moreover, in the wake of the Peterloo Massacre, he supported the government, lauding the use of deadly force against "the Radicals and their system".

== Family ==
He briefly married Elizabeth Mullen in 1759, and had a daughter, Harriet Luttrell. This marriage was later annulled.

He married Jane Boyd, daughter of George Boyd, in June 1776, but they had no children and was succeeded by his brother John.

Carhampton did have an illegitimate son, Henry Luttrell (1765–1851). He wrote light verse, and was a famous wit and diner-out. Quite from his father's tastes, he was a frequent companion of Thomas Moore, Ireland's national bard, a hagiographer of United Irishmen and a close confidante of leading Whigs.

Parliament of Great Britain
Preceded by Edward Wortley Montagu; Lord Mount Stuart	Member of Parliament for Bossiney; 1768–1769; With: Lord Mount Stuart	Succeeded by Lord Mount Stuart; Sir George Osborn, Bt
Preceded by John Wilkes; John Glynn	Member of Parliament for Middlesex; 1769–1774; With: John Glynn	Succeeded by John Glynn; John Wilkes
Preceded by Lord Mount Stuart; Sir George Osborn, Bt	Member of Parliament for Bossiney; 1774–1784; With: Lord Mount Stuart 1774–1776; Charles Stuart 1776–1784	Succeeded by Charles Stuart; Bamber Gascoyne
Preceded by John Stephenson; John Pardoe	Member of Parliament for Plympton Erle; 1790–1794; With: Philip Metcalfe	Succeeded by Philip Metcalfe; William Manning
Parliament of Ireland
Preceded by Robert Jephson; Sir John Blaquiere	Member of Parliament for Old Leighlin; 1783–1787; With: Hon. Arthur Acheson	Succeeded by Sir Edward Leslie, Bt; Hon. Arthur Acheson
Parliament of the United Kingdom
Preceded by Joseph Birch; Charles Nicholas Pallmer	Member of Parliament for Ludgershall; 1817–1821; With: Joseph Birch 1817–1818; Sandford Graham 1818–1821	Succeeded by Sandford Graham; Earl of Brecknock
Military offices
Preceded by Sir John Irwin	Colonel of the 6th Regiment of Dragoon Guards; 1788–1821	Succeeded by Robert Taylor
Preceded by The Lord Rossmore	Commander-in-Chief, Ireland; 1796–1798	Succeeded by Sir Ralph Abercromby
Peerage of Ireland
Preceded by Simon Luttrell	Earl of Carhampton; 1787–1821	Succeeded by John Luttrell-Olmius
