= Simon Luttrell, 1st Earl of Carhampton =

Anglo-Irish politician

Simon Luttrell House of Commons
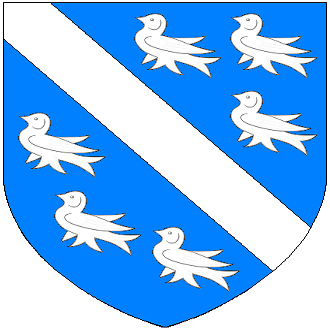
- Simon Luttrell, 1st Earl of Carhampton, Baron of Irnham

House of Commons
- In office 1754–1780

Personal details
- Born: 1713 Luttrellstown, Clonsilla Parish, County Dublin, Ireland
- Died: 14 January 1787 (aged 73–74) Four Oaks, Warwick, England
- Resting place: Kingsbury, Warwick, England
- Spouse: Judith Maria Lawes
- Children: Five sons, four daughters
- Parent(s): Colonel Henry Luttrell and Elizabeth Jones
- Occupation: Landowner

Simon Luttrell, 1st Earl of Carhampton (c. 1713 – 14 January 1787) was an Anglo-Irish politician who sat in the House of Commons of Great Britain from 1754 to 1780.

== Biography ==
He was the second son of Henry Luttrell, of Luttrellstown (whose family had held Luttrellstown since the land there had been granted to Sir Geoffrey de Luterel in about 1210 by King John of England) and his wife Elizabeth Jones. His father had been a noted commander in the Jacobite Irish Army between 1689 and 1691. He later received a pardon from the Williamite authorities and was accused by his former Jacobite comrades of having betrayed them. He was murdered when his sedan chair was attacked in Dublin in 1717.

Simon Luttrell served as a Member of Parliament in the House of Commons of Great Britain for four constituencies: Mitchell (1755–1761), Wigan (1761–1768), Weobley (1768–1774) and Stockbridge (1774–1780).

On 13 October 1768, he was created Baron Irnham of Luttrellstown in the Peerage of Ireland. As his title was an Irish peerage, he was able to keep his seat in the British House of Commons. He was elevated to the title of Viscount Carhampton on 9 January 1781 and was made Earl of Carhampton on 23 June 1785. He lived at Four Oaks Hall, Four Oaks, Sutton Coldfield, from 1751 to 1766.

On 22 January 1735, he married Judith Maria Lawes, daughter of Sir Nicholas Lawes, Governor of Jamaica and Elizabeth Cotton (née Lawley), by whom he had nine children:

- Henry Lawes Luttrell, 2nd Earl of Carhampton (1737–1821)
- Temple Simon Luttrell (1738 – 1803)
- John Luttrell-Olmius, 3rd Earl of Carhampton (1739 – 1829), married the Honorable Elizabeth Olmius and in 1787 by Royal Licence the additional surname of 'Olmius' out of respect after his father-in-law died.
- James Luttrell (c. 1751 – 1788), naval officer, died of consumption.
- Thomas Luttrell (died 1766)
- Catherine Maria Luttrell (1741-1770)died unmarried
- Anne Luttrell (1743 – 1808), married first in 1765 Christopher Horton, married second in 1771 to Prince Henry, Duke of Cumberland and Strathearn, brother of King George III of the United Kingdom, without consent, resulting in the Royal Marriages Act 1772.
- Elizabeth Luttrell (1744-1799)
- Lucy Luttrell (1752-1813)

Judith was the heir to a slave plantation owned by her father, which after the marriage came into Luttrell's ownership, and eventually passed into the control of his son. His rakish behaviour earned him the nickname "King of Hell", "Hell" being a district of Dublin notorious for its brothels. He is reputed to have started the courtesan Mary Nesbitt in her career by seducing her.

Parliament of Great Britain
| Preceded by Robert Clive; John Stephenson | Member of Parliament for Mitchell; 1754–1761; With: Richard Hussey | Succeeded by John Stephenson; James Scawen |
| Preceded by Richard Barry; Sir William Meredith, Bt | Member of Parliament for Wigan; 1761–1768; With: Fletcher Norton | Succeeded by George Byng; Beaumont Hotham |
| Preceded by Henry Frederick Thynne; William Lynch | Member of Parliament for Weobley; 1768–1774; With: Henry Frederick Thynne 1768–70; Bamber Gascoyne 1770–74 | Succeeded by Sir William Lynch; John St. Leger Douglas |
| Preceded by Richard Fuller; James Hare | Member of Parliament for Stockbridge; 1774–1780; With: John Luttrell 1774–75; James Luttrell 1775–80 | Succeeded by James Luttrell; John Luttrell |
Peerage of Ireland
| New title | Earl of Carhampton; 1785–1787 | Succeeded by Henry Luttrell |
| New title | Viscount Carhampton; 1781–1787 | Succeeded by Henry Luttrell |
| New title | Baron Irnham; 1768–1787 | Succeeded by Henry Luttrell |
