= James Hare (British politician) =

British politician and diplomat (1747–1804)

James Hare (1747–1804) was an English politician, diplomat and wit.

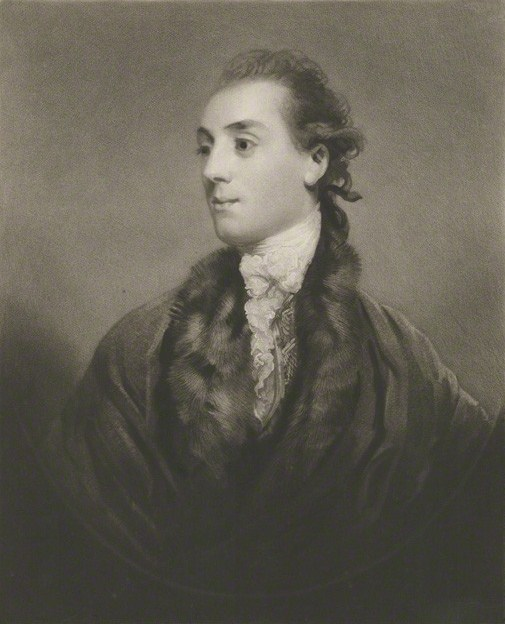
James Hare

== Life ==
He was the son of Joseph Hare, an apothecary of Wells, Somerset. He was educated at Eton College, and entered King's College, Cambridge in December 1765. He graduated B.A. in 1770, having become a fellow in 1768, a position he held to 1774.

Hare entered London life, where his status as a wit was generally recognised. Georgiana Cavendish, Duchess of Devonshire described Hare as having "a manner of placing every object in so new a light that his kind of wit always surprises as much as it pleases." He associated with the fashionable set of Frederick Howard, 5th Earl of Carlisle, Earl Fitzwilliam, General Richard FitzPatrick, Charles James Fox, and Anthony Morris Storer. He sat for the borough of Stockbridge, in Hampshire, from May 1772 to 1774, and then for Knaresborough, a constituency controlled by the Duke of Devonshire, from 3 July 1781 until his death in 1804. He broke down in his maiden parliamentary speech, and never made a second attempt.

One of the few trustworthy and discreet members of the Ton (le bon ton), Hare was a loyal, kind friend to Georgiana Cavendish, Duchess of Devonshire to his death. For example, Hare had several illegitimate children of his own, and was sympathetic to the plight of Georgiana's friend Lady Elizabeth Foster's illegitimate children; he went out of his way to check on Foster's illegitimate children in France in the midst of the French Revolution. Hare brushed off his kindness, writing to Foster, "The constant anxiety which I feel for my own children would of itself sufficiently dispose me to assist almost anybody when children are concerned." He helped convince Georgiana to allow Foster's illegitimate daughter Caroline St. Jules to publicly become a member of the family by allowing her to live at Devonshire House.

Of his physical appearance, he was "stick-thin, with a face so white he appeared more dead than alive."

Hare was a gambling addict, and he was always in debt. His seat in Parliament – courtesy of the Duke of Devonshire – was the only reason he was not sent to debtors' prison. While his grandfather was a bishop, his father was a mere apothecary. Hare had gambled away his small inheritance and thereafter remained dependent on his rich Whig friends as a house guest.

From October 1779 to January 1782 he was minister plenipotentiary in Poland.

In 1802 he was very ill in Paris, and Fox paid him frequent visits. After taking a stroll with Georgiana's mother Georgiana Spencer, Countess Spencer, he caught a head-cold that turned into pneumonia; he died at Bath, Somerset 10 March 1804. Hare was greatly mourned by his friends, including Georgiana, the Duke of Devonshire, and Bess Foster.

== Works ==
Hare was believed to have been one of the writers of the Rolliad.

== Family ==
Hare's fortune was improved by his marriage at St. George's, Hanover Square, London, on 21 January 1774, to Hannah, only daughter of Sir Abraham Hume, 1st Baronet. She died 6 May 1827, and a monument to her memory was placed in the chancel of Wormley Church, Hertfordshire. They had one daughter.

== Notes ==
Attribution

This article incorporates text from a publication now in the public domain: Stephen, Leslie; Lee, Sidney, eds. (1890). "Hare, James". Dictionary of National Biography. Vol. 24. London: Smith, Elder & Co.

Parliament of Great Britain
Preceded by Richard Worge; Richard Fuller	Member of Parliament for Stockbridge; 1772–1774; With: Richard Fuller	Succeeded by The Lord Irnham; Hon. John Luttrell
Preceded by Viscount Duncannon; Hon. Robert Walsingham	Member of Parliament for Knaresborough; 1781 – 1800; With: Viscount Duncannon to 1793; Lord John Townshend from 1793	Succeeded by Parliament of the United Kingdom
Parliament of the United Kingdom
Preceded by Parliament of Great Britain	Member of Parliament for Knaresborough; 1801–1804; With: Lord John Townshend	Succeeded by Lord John Townshend; William Cavendish
