= Action of 12 December 1782 =

Naval engagement in the American Revolutionary War

- Part of the American Revolutionary War
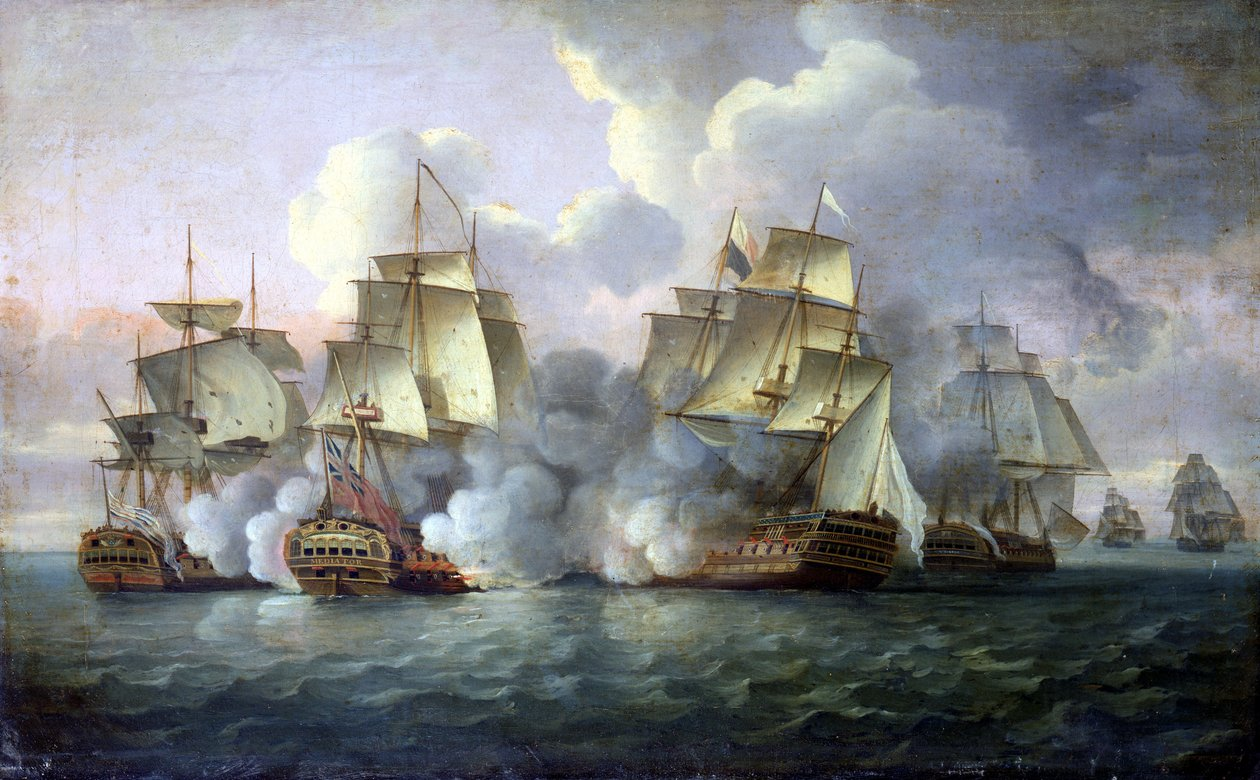
- 1783 painting of the action
Date	12 December 1782
Location	Off Ferrol, Atlantic Ocean 43.471°N 8.252°W
Result	British victory

Belligerents
Great Britain	France; United States

Commanders and leaders
James Luttrell	Nicolas Baudin

Strength
1 frigate	1 ship of the line 1 frigate 1 armed transport 2 privateers

Casualties and losses
7 killed or wounded	9 killed 16 wounded 340 captured 1 ship of the line captured 1 privateer captured

The action of 12 December 1782 was a naval engagement fought off the coast of Spain near Ferrol, in which the British 40-gun fifth rate HMS Mediator successfully attacked a convoy of five armed ships. Mediator succeeded in capturing one American privateer, the Alexander, and then captured the French ex-ship of the line La Ménagère. The convoy was part of Pierre-Augustin de Beaumarchais' supply chain to the American colonists.

== Background ==
French diplomat Pierre-Augustin de Beaumarchais founded a commercial enterprise, Roderigue Hortalez and Co., supported by France and Spain. The French and Spanish supplied the American rebels with weapons, munitions, clothes, and provisions that would never be paid for. Beaumarchais contracted for the transport of the supplies in convoys. Even so, the Royal Navy captured many of the transport vessels.

Beaumarchais assembled one convoy in December 1782. He met his captains in Bordeaux and then supervised the loading of his vessels. The plan was to sail for Port-au-Prince, Saint Domingue and then on to America to supply the American colonists.

The convoy consisted of five ships:

- Alexander was a corvette that Beaumarchais purchased in 1781 in Bordeaux. She was under the command of Commander Stephen Gregory, who had an American privateer commission issued in France (a "Congress" commission) and sailed under a French ensign and an American pennant. She had a mixed American and French crew of 102 men and was armed with twenty-four long 9-pounder guns. She was of about 500 tons burthen and carried a cargo of stores and provisions.
- Aimable Eugénie, which was named after Beaumarchais' daughter, was under the command of Nicolas Baudin. She mounted 36 guns and had a crew of 130 men; she was the primary escort for the convoy. Beaumarchais had bought her at Nantes in March 1782 for £t300,000.
- Ménagère, which was under the command of François Jérome Foligné-Deschalonges, had a burthen of 600 tons (bm) and was a two decked vessel, launched in 1775 or '76. She was a former 64-gun ship of the line, and now armed en flûte, with twenty-six 12-pounders on her main deck and four 6-pounders on her forecastle and quarterdeck. She had a crew of 212 men and carried 100 tons of gunpowder plus naval stores and bale goods.
- Dauphin Royal was under the command of Antoine Chambert. She was a transport purchased and armed at Bordeaux for the Marine Royale. She was of 300 tons burthen (bm), armed with twenty-eight guns and carried a crew of 120 men.
- The convoy also included an unknown American privateer brig with 14 guns and a crew of 70 men.

On 9 December 1782 the convoy sailed from the mouth of the Gironde for the West Indies and from there America. On 12 December, at 7:00am, HMS Mediator, under the command of James Luttrell, was sailing off Ferrol when she sighted the convoy.

== Battle ==
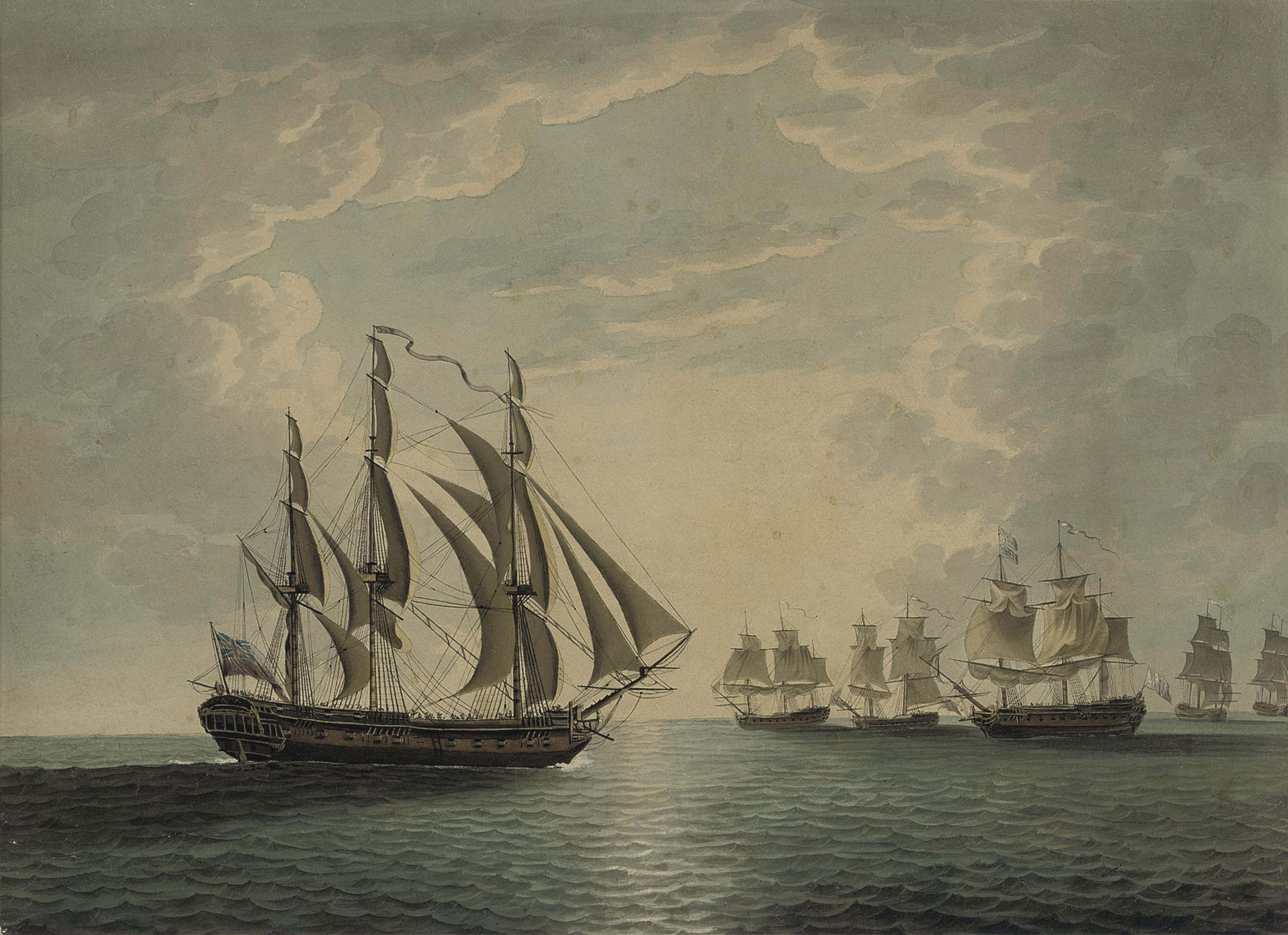
H.M.S. Mediator about to attack an enemy convoy off Cape Ortegal, 12th December 1782, Robert Dodd

At 8am the convoy formed in line of battle. Notwithstanding this formidable array, Captain Luttrell continued bearing down and at 10:00am Ménagère initiated the action. Luttrell saw that the shot came from the upper deck only and rightly concluded that the French vessel had no lower-deck guns. Mediator bore up in order to bring the rear ship to action.

At 10:30am Mediator opened fire on Dauphin Royal when that ship and the Alexander bore up out of the line. Aimable Eugénie, Ménagère and the American brig then wore and endeavored to protect the two rear ships.

Mediator fought her way through the Franco-American line. At 11am Luttrell was able to cut off Alexander and compelled her to strike. He then took possession of the Alexander while the rest of the French and American vessels were trying to escape before the wind. Once Luttrell had succeeded in removing the prisoners and placing a prize-master and crew on board Alexander, he pursued the retreating ships.

At 3pm the Aimable Eugénie hauled off the wind in full sail. Mediator then followed Ménagère. At 5p.m. he got within gunshot of Ménagère and started a running fight. At 9:00pm Mediator, having got up with the Ménagère, was on the point of firing a full broadside. Before she could do so Ménagère struck. At this point the action ended.

Because the enemy fired high in an attempt to damage Mediator's rigging, she sustained no casualties. Ménagere had four men killed and seven or eight wounded. Alexandre had six killed and eight or nine wounded.

Dauphin Royal and the American brig were seen next morning severely damaged but only five miles from Ferrol. However Luttrell judged it prudent to make sail for England with his two prizes. He had 340 prisoners on board and only 100 men to guard them while being close to Spain.

== Aftermath ==
Mediator sustained only seven casualties in her crew but was cut up in the riggings in masts which had been the target of the French and American ships. Alexander had six men killed and nine wounded; La Ménagère had a passenger returning to Saint-Domingue and three seamen killed, and several men wounded.

Despite being well-treated, Captain Gregory organized a party of the prisoners in an attempt to gain possession of Mediator. He was subdued but then unsuccessfully attempted to set fire to the ship. After this Luttrell had Gregory and the American prisoners placed in irons. Although the French officers played no part in the attempt, the British also guarded them more closely. Michael Seymour, who was later to be a rear admiral, served as a midshipman in HMS Mediator.

Aimable Eugénie reached Saint-Domingue in March 1783, where she was wrecked on the coastal reef at Porto Plata.

Luttrell and his crew received the last of the prize money for Alexandre and Ménagere in October 1788.

The action was the final clash of arms in which American forces were engaged before the Treaty of Paris concluded the war.
