= Geoffrey de Luterel =

Anglo-Norman nobleman

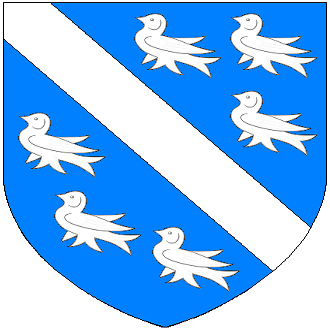
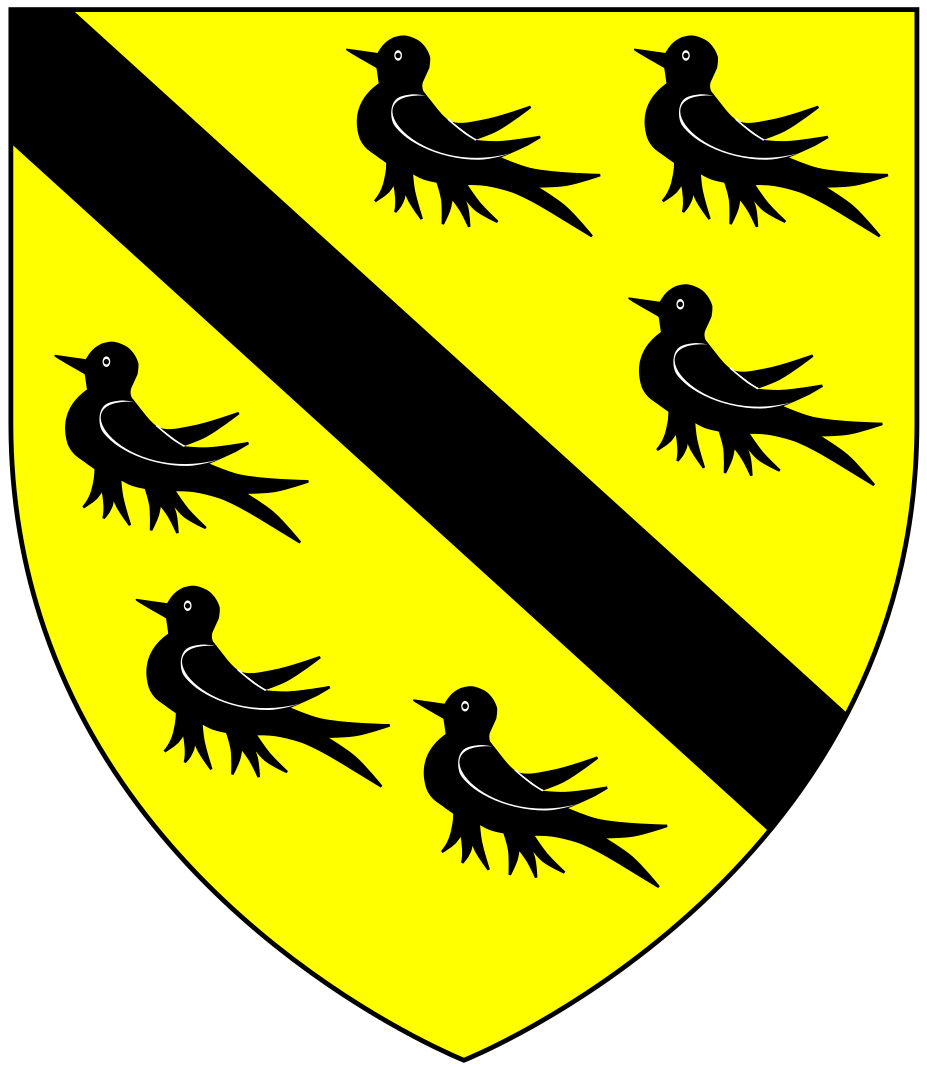
Arms of Luttrell differenced by tincture: left: Azure, a bend between six martlets argent (Luttrell of Irnham, as shown in the Luttrell Psalter); right: Or, a bend between six martlets sable (Luttrell of Dunster Castle). It is not clear which version was originally adopted by the common ancestor of both families, Geoffrey de Luterel, at the start of the age of heraldry (circa 1200–1215)

Geoffrey de Luterel (c. 1158–1218), was a courtier and confidant of King John, whom he served as a minister.

== Origins ==
Geoffrey was born around 1158 in Gamston, Nottinghamshire, England, the son of Alfred de Luterel (1105–1170).

== Relations with King John ==
In the time of Richard I, the lands of Geoffrey, in the counties Nottingham and Derby, were seized by the crown, for his adherence to Prince John, but he was compensated, upon the accession of John as king, by extensive territorial and other grants.

Geoffrey travelled with King John on missions to Ireland and Italy and in about 1210 was granted lands near Dublin, Ireland where he established the township of Luttrellstown, near Clonsilla. In 1215 he was also granted the townland of Cratloe in County Clare, including the Cratloe Oak Woods.

In 1215, John appointed Geoffrey to be his sole agent in negotiations with regard to the dower of Queen Berengaria, commissioning him at the same time to join with the Archbishops of Bordeaux and Dublin in denouncing to the Pope the rebellious barons who had recently extorted the Great Charter of English Liberties. In one of the documents connected with this business, he is styled 'nobilis vir' . His mission was so far successful that Innocent the Third annulled the Charter, suspended the Archbishop of Canterbury, and excommunicated the barons, but it is uncertain whether Geoffrey was the one of those who conveyed the papal bull from Rome to England.

== Marriage and children ==
On 26 February 1190, Geoffrey married Frethesant Paynel (alias Paganel, etc.), heiress of several estates including Irnham, Lincolnshire and East Quantoxhead, Somerset and others in Yorkshire, which thus passed to the Luttrell family. With his wife he had three children:

- Andrew de Lutrel (1st Baron Irnham) (1205–1264) married abt 1225 Petronella daughter of Philip de la Mare.
- Robert de Lutrel.
- Margeret de Luterel

Frethyesant Paynel married second, Henry de Newmarch in 1219.

Henry de Newmarch was dead in 1239; and Frethesant appears to have married Roger de Thrybergh as her third husband. In 1240 Roger de Triberge and Frethesant his wife quitclaimed for themselves and her heirs to Andrew Luterel and his heirs a moiety of the manor of Hooton Pagnell and all the lands and tenements which were of the heritage of William Paynel; and Andrew granted them land in Hooton, to hold to them and the heirs of Frethesant of him and his heirs.

== Later life and death ==
In 1216 Geoffrey was declared non compos mentis and was placed in the custody of his brother, John Luttrell. Geoffrey died in the second year of Henry III, 1218, and was succeeded by his son, Andrew De Luteral, of Irnham, county Lincoln.

On 15 May 1218, the sheriff of Yorkshire was ordered to take security from Henry de Newmarch for 40 marks, which he had undertaken to pay for having as his wife Frethesant, widow of Geoffrey Luterel, should she be willing, and to give him seisin of her lands. Frethesant Paynel occurs as the wife of Henry de Newmarch in 1219, when her lands included a moiety of Barton[-le-Street] in Ryedale wapentake, a moiety of [Nether] Silton i Birdforth wapentake, and 10li worth of land in Strafforth wapentake.

== Legacy ==
Geoffrey was the head of the three main branches of the Luttrell family, namely:

- Luttrell of Luttrellstown and Luttrellstown Castle, Ireland, held for almost 600 years by his descendants, created in 1768 Barons Irnham, in 1781 Viscounts Carhampton and in 1785 Earls of Carhampton.
- Luttrell of East Quantoxhead, Somerset, which family went on to acquire nearby Dunster Castle in 1376, which it held until the extinction of the male line in 1737, but which continued to be held via a female line (which adopted the surname and arms of Luttrell) until 1976 when donated to the National Trust.
- Luttrell of Irnham, Lincolnshire, a member of which branch, Sir Geoffrey Luttrell III (1276–1345), commissioned the Luttrell Psalter (c.1340–1345), and which branch became extinct in about 1418.
