= Earl of Carhampton =

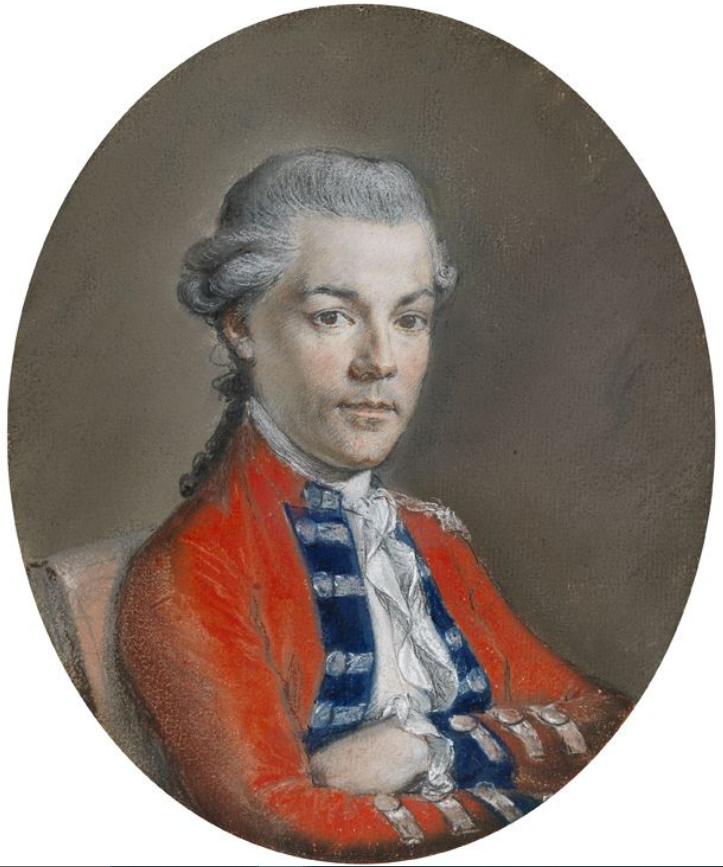
Henry Luttrell, 2nd Earl of Carhampton

Earl of Carhampton was a title in the Peerage of Ireland. It was created in 1785 for Simon Luttrell, 1st Viscount Carhampton. He had already been created Baron Irnham, of Luttrellstown in the County of Dublin, in 1768 and Viscount Carhampton, of Castlehaven in the County of Cork, in 1781, also in the Peerage of Ireland. He was the son of Henry Luttrell. His daughter Anne Horton married Prince Henry, Duke of Cumberland and Strathearn (brother of then King George III). Lord Carhampton was succeeded by his eldest son, the second earl. He was a general in the British Army and served as the commander-in-chief of Ireland from 1796 to 1798. He was childless and was succeeded by his younger brother, the third earl. He was a captain in the Royal Navy and also sat as Member of Parliament for Stockbridge. He married as his first wife the Honourable Elizabeth Olmius (died 1796), daughter of John Olmius, 1st Baron Waltham, and assumed in 1787 by royal licence the additional surname of Olmius. Lord Carhampton had no sons and the titles became extinct on his death in 1829. Already the same year George IV offered to revive the earldom in favour of Sir Simeon Stuart, 5th Baronet, son of Sir Simeon Stuart, 4th Baronet, and his wife Lady Frances Maria, daughter of the third earl. However, the offer was declined.

Carhampton is a village about one mile from Dunster, Somerset, Irnham Manor in Lincolnshire was an ancient seat of the Luttrells (1200-1410).

== Earls of Carhampton ==
- Simon Luttrell, 1st Earl of Carhampton (1713–1787)
- Henry Lawes Luttrell, 2nd Earl of Carhampton (1743–1821)
- John Luttrell-Olmius, 3rd Earl of Carhampton (1739–1829),

== See also ==
- Stuart Baronets, of Hartley Mauduit
- Luttrell Psalter
