= Henry Luttrell (Jacobite commander) =

Irish army officer

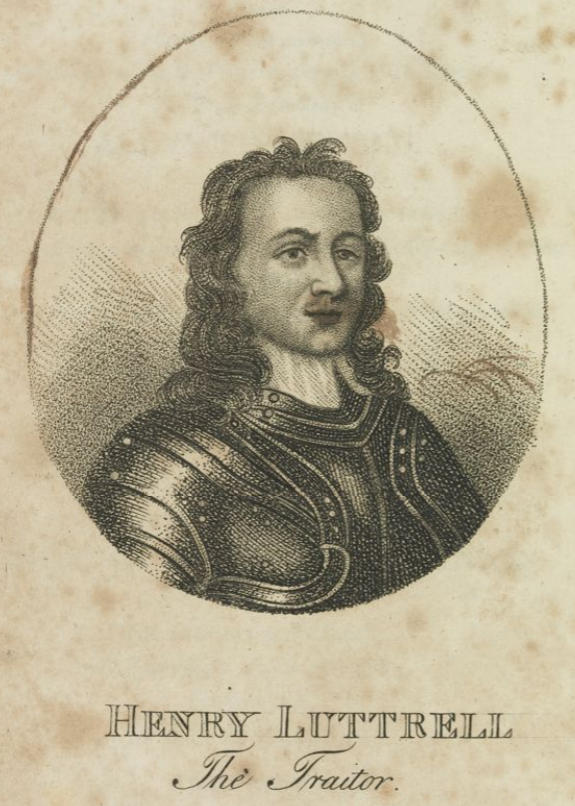
- The Irish Magazine, Published by Walter Cox, Feb.-Nov. 1808, Jan. 1809 - July 1812 (plate from 1809)
- Born: c.1655 Luttrellstown, County Dublin, Ireland
- Died: 22 October 1717; Dublin, Ireland
- Cause of death: Assassinated (Shot)
- Resting place: St Mary's Churchyard, Clonsilla, County Dublin, Ireland
- Occupations: Soldier, politician
- Spouse: Elizabeth Jones
- Children: Robert Luttrell, Simon Luttrell
- Parent(s): Thomas Luttrell of Luttrellstown; Barbara Segrave

Henry Luttrell (c. 1655 – 22 October 1717) was an Irish army officer known for his service in the Jacobite cause. A career soldier, Luttrell served James II in England until his overthrow in 1688. In Ireland he continued to fight for James, reaching the rank of General in the Irish Army.

After it was revealed in 1691 that he was in secret contact with enemy commanders he was tried and imprisoned. Following the Treaty of Limerick he was pardoned by the Williamite rulers of Ireland. He was rewarded with the estate of Luttrellstown which had been confiscated from his elder brother Simon Luttrell.

Although he sought a military command in the forces of William III of England this was denied him. In 1717 Luttrell was murdered in Dublin, in a case that was never solved.

== Early life ==
He was the second son of Thomas Luttrell of Luttrellstown in County Dublin, an Irish landowner of Catholic heritage. Luttrell spent his early life on the Continent, where he killed the so-called 3rd Viscount Purbeck in a duel at Liège.

== Glorious Revolution ==
In England he was commissioned a Captain in Princess Anne of Denmark's Regiment of Foot in 1685 and in 1686 was given command of the 4th Troop of Horse Grenadier Guards. During the Glorious Revolution he fought under Patrick Sarsfield at the Wincanton Skirmish in November 1688. At a time when many officers of the English Army defected to William of Orange, he remained loyal to James II.

== War in Ireland ==
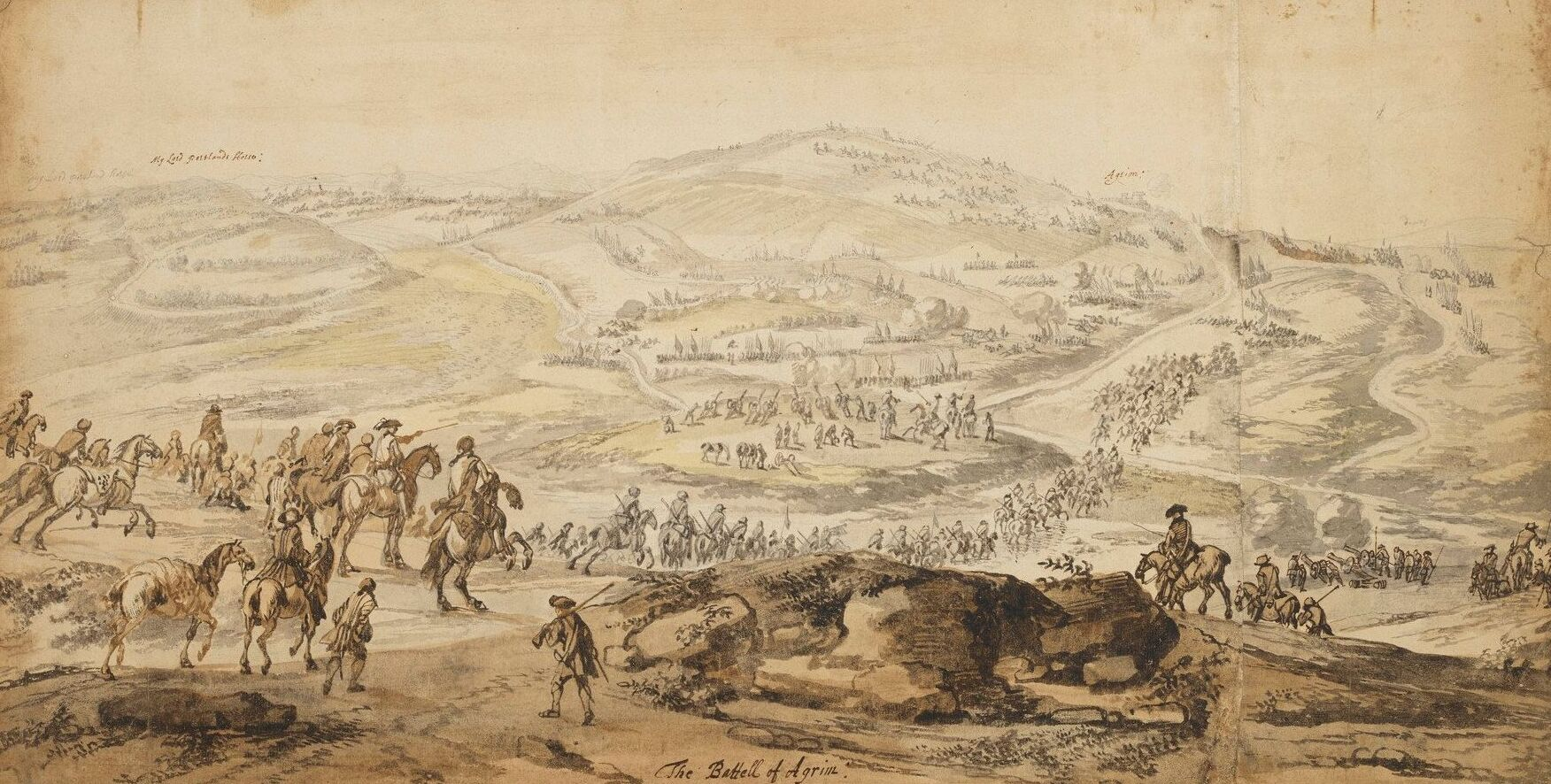
The Battle of Aughrim. Luttrell's conduct during the battle became a subject of historical debate.

Following the disintegration of the English Army and William's capture of London, Luttrell went to Ireland. He joined the Irish Army under the command of Richard Talbot, Earl of Tyrconnell, which had remained loyal to James and was undergoing a major expansion. Luttrell and other Catholic officers flocked to the army, while Protestants were purged. Protestant inhabitants in Ireland rose, proclaiming their loyalty to William of Orange. While an uprising at Bandon in County Cork was quickly put down, a lengthy Siege of Derry began. Luttrell was given command of a cavalry regiment. He also sat in the Patriot Parliament called by King James, as a representative for County Carlow.

In 1689 he was made Governor of Sligo, which had recently been recaptured from the enemy by Patrick Sarsfield. He immediately set about improving the town's fortifications. Luttrell was a friend and supporter of Sarsfield, and backed his policy of continued resistance following the Jacobite defeat at the Battle of the Boyne in 1690.

His precipitate withdrawal with the cavalry of the left flank at the Battle of Aughrim gave rise to suspicions of disloyalty.

During the Siege of Limerick, he was found to be in correspondence with the besiegers, and scarcely escaped hanging, bringing his regiment of horse over to the Williamite side after the surrender of the city. As a reward, he received the forfeited estates of his elder brother, Simon Luttrell, including Luttrellstown, and was made a major general in the Dutch army.

== Later life ==
He attempted to deprive his brother's widow, Catherine, of her jointure by discreditable means, but was ultimately obliged to yield it to her.

On 13 October 1704, he married Elizabeth Jones and had two sons:

- Robert Luttrell (d. 1727), while abroad "on his travels"
- Colonel Simon Luttrell, 1st Earl of Carhampton (1713–1787)

He was shot and mortally wounded in his sedan chair on the night of 22 October 1717, on the Blind-quay in Dublin as he was proceeding from Lucas' Coffee House on Cork-hill to his house in Stafford Street. He died the next day, at the age of sixty-three. According to the reports circulated at the time, it was a blacksmith of his own name, residing in Bridge-street, Dublin, who did so, in the hope of succeeding to his estates; believing that the Colonel was not married to the mother of his children. However, no charges seemed to come of it. Despite large rewards, the murderers were never apprehended. The Irish house of commons believed that it was an act of revenge on the part of 'papists', but he had many other enemies.

An attempt was made too to kill his grandson Henry Luttrell, 2nd Earl of Carhampton, also heavily despised with many enemies, and who sold Luttrellstown Castle, which the family had owned for almost 600 years, in 1800. After Luttrellstown Castle was sold, Colonel Luttrell's grave was opened and the skull smashed.

== Bibliography ==
- Childs, John. The Williamite Wars in Ireland. Bloomsbury Publishing, 2007.
- D'Alton, John. King James's Irish Army List. 1855.
- Wauchope, Piers. Patrick Sarsfield and the Williamite War. Irish Academic Press, 1992.

Parliament of Ireland
Preceded by Sir John Temple; Sir William Temple, Bt	Member of Parliament for County Carlow; 1689; With: Dudley Bagenal	Succeeded by Sir Thomas Butler, Bt; John Tench
