= Luttrellstown Castle =

15th-19th century castle in Dublin, Ireland

Coordinates: 53°22′45.36″N 6°25′2.84″W

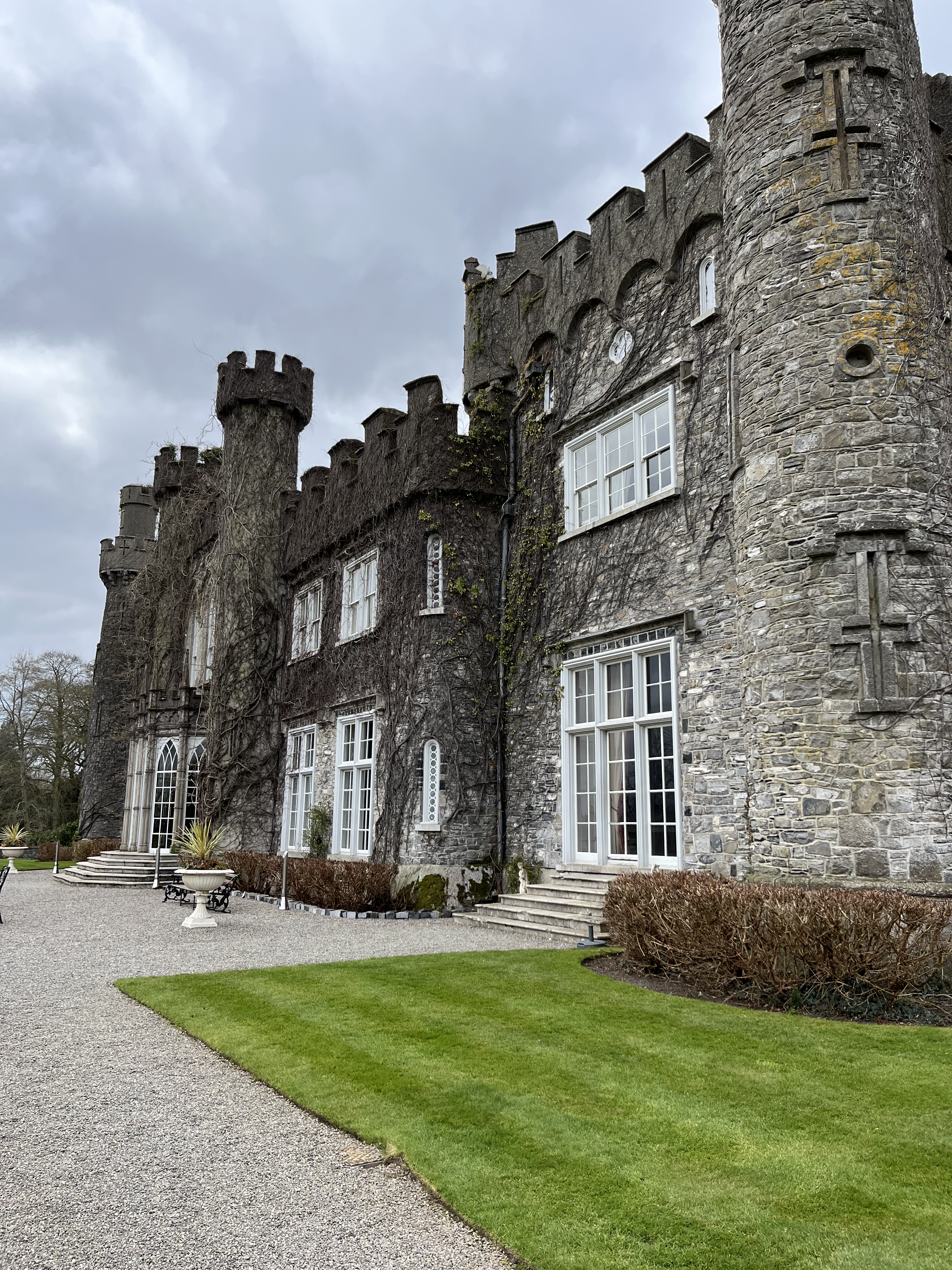
- Garden front of castle

- Location within Ireland
- Alternative names: Woodlands

General information
- Status: Hotel
- Architectural style: Gothic, Georgian
- Location: Clonsilla, Dublin, Ireland
- Groundbreaking: 1787-94 (for Henry Luttrell)
- Estimated completion: 1810 (extended and remodelled)

Design and construction
- Other designers: Bartholomew Byrne - stucco work (1794)
- Quantity surveyor: Bryan Bolger (1794)
- Main contractor: G&T Crampton (1985-86)

Other information
- Number of rooms: 20 bedrooms

Website
- www.luttrellstowncastle.com

Luttrellstown Castle is a castellated house located in Clonsilla on the outskirts of Dublin, Ireland dating from the early 15th century (c. 1420).

It has been owned variously by the eponymous and notorious Luttrell family, by the bookseller Luke White and his descendants Baron Annaly, by the Guinness family, the Primwest Group, and since 2006, by JP McManus, John Magnier and Aidan Brooks. The castle has hosted visits by Queen Victoria in 1844 and 1900, and its media profile was raised when Victoria Adams married David Beckham there on 4 July 1999.

== Demesne ==
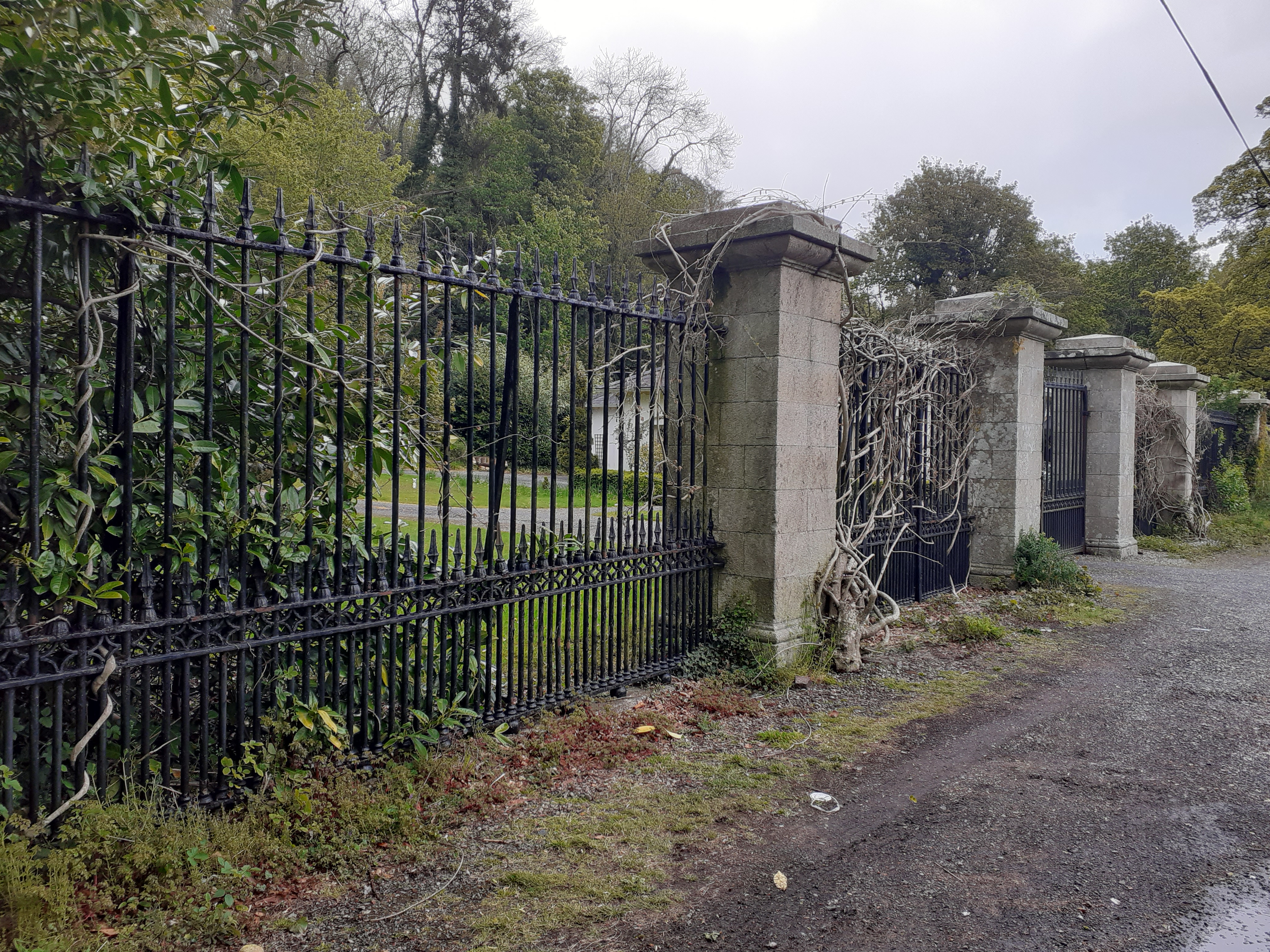
An entrance to Luttrelestown estate near the Liffey

Luttrellstown Demesne originally comprised the entirety of the townland of "Woodlands" in the civil parish of Clonsilla. Today, Luttrellstown Castle Resort and its remaining 560-acre (2.3 km^{2}) demesne currently form a 5-star resort and a golf course just outside the city boundaries of Dublin. A stream rising near the townland of Pass-If-You-Can enters an aqueduct in the townland of Westmanstown and passes under the Royal Canal before entering the north-western corner of the demesne. Within the walls of the demesne, the waters are dammed to form a chain of artificial ponds. The stream exits the south-eastern corner of the demesne at a gate lodge on the Strawberry Beds, passing under the road before falling into the River Liffey 25 metres later.

== History ==
=== The Luttrell family ===
The demesne and adjoining lands were granted to Sir Geoffrey de Luterel about 1210 by King John of England. Sir Geoffrey served as the king's minister on many missions of state to Ireland from 1204 to 1216. He was the ancestor of the Luttrells of Dunster Castle in Somersetshire, England. The family became the biggest landowners in the district by the 17th century. Robert Luttrell was treasurer of St Patrick's Cathedral and Lord Chancellor of Ireland from 1235 to 1245, and married into the Plunkett family.

The castle was started by Sir Geoffrey Luttrell, the 5th Lord Luttrell, who was born about 1385. Sir Thomas Luttrell was Chief Justice of the Irish Common Pleas, 1534-1554, and actively involved in the dissolution of the monasteries. He acquired the lands of St Mary's Abbey at Coolmine.

Colonel Henry Luttrell, (born about 1655, died 22 October 1717), the second son of Thomas Luttrell of Luttrellstown, was an Anglo-Irish soldier. He was suspected of betraying the Irish leader Patrick Sarsfield, either by his precipitate withdrawal of his Jacobite troops or by giving the army of King William III of England strategic information about a ford of a river, leading to the loss of the Battle of Aughrim in 1691. The Sarsfield estate at Lucan Manor coincidentally bordered Luttrellstown. After the Siege of Limerick, Luttrell brought his regiment into the Williamite cause. For this act, he was rewarded with the forfeited estates of his elder brother, Simon Luttrell, including Luttrellstown, and was made a major general in the Dutch army. He was assassinated in his sedan chair outside his townhouse in Stafford Street, Dublin, in October 1717. Colonel Simon Luttrell, 1st Earl of Carhampton (1713–14 January 1787), was an Irish nobleman who became a politician at Westminster. He was the second son of Colonel Henry Luttrell of Luttrellstown and became Lord Lieutenant of County Dublin. His daughter Anne became in 1771 the wife of Prince Henry, Duke of Cumberland and Strathearn, brother of King George III.

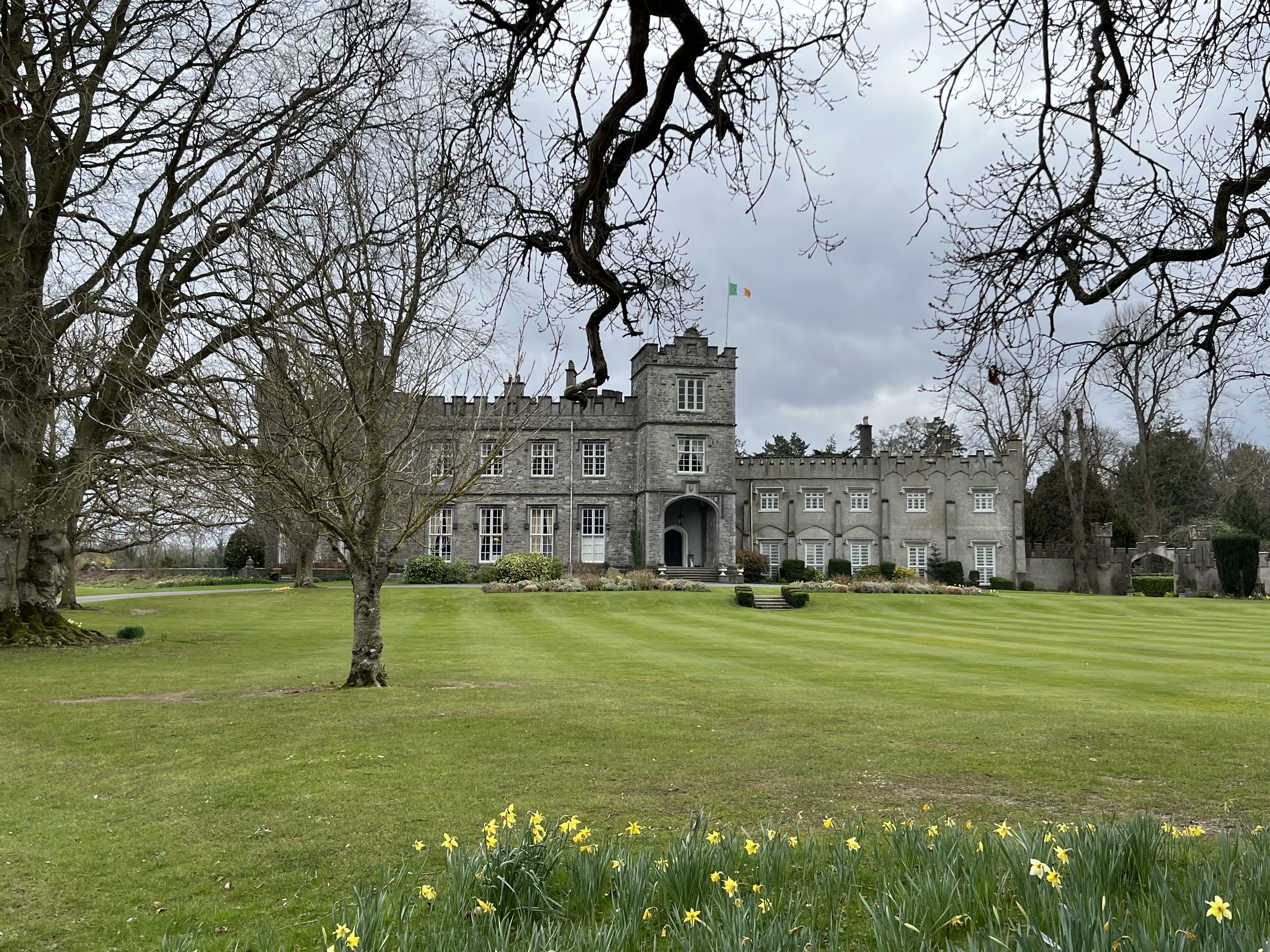
Main entrance and side of castle

Henry Lawes Luttrell, 2nd Earl of Carhampton (born 1743, died 1821) was the son of Simon, 6th Lord Luttrell of Luttrellstown. He served as a Member of Parliament for Bossiney in 1768, and subsequently was Adjutant General of Ireland, where he became notorious for his role in suppressing the Irish Rebellion of 1798. He was so hated that he sold Luttrellstown Castle in 1800, but in a revenge attack, the grave of his grandfather Colonel Henry Luttrell (died 1717) was opened and the skull smashed. His 'popularity' in Ireland is encapsulated by an incident in which the Dublin Post of 2 May 1811 reported his death. Luttrell demanded a retraction, which the newspaper printed, but it appeared under the headline Public Disappointment. Luttrell was an absentee landlord who also owned an estate in the West Indies but resided at Painshill Park in Surrey, England.

=== Luke White ===
Henry Lawes Luttrell sold Luttrellstown to publisher Luke White in 1811, described as one of the most remarkable men that Ireland produced and ancestor of Lord Annaly. In 1778 Luke White started as an impecunious book dealer, buying in Dublin and reselling around the country. By 1798, during the rebellion, he helped the Irish government with a loan of 1 million pounds (at £65 per £100 share at 5%). He became M.P. for Leitrim, and died in 1824 leaving properties worth £175,000 per annum. Luke White changed the name to Woodlands to eradicate the name of Luttrell. Eventually the estate devolved to his fourth son who was created Lord Annaly, peer of the United Kingdom. White's great-grandson, the 3rd Lord Annaly, reverted the building's name to Luttrell Castle.

Queen Victoria first visited Luttrellstown in 1844 en route to the Duke of Leinster at Carton House. In 1900, en route to the Viceregal Lodge she drank a cup of tea near the waterfall, an event commemorated by Lord Annaly with an obelisk made of six granite blocks from the Dublin mountains.

In 1915, Lord Annaly sold the house to a Major Hamilton who soon moved on to Holdenby House in Northamptonshire and died three years later in 1918 when the house was left to his widow.

=== Ernest Guinness ===
In 1927 the estate was bought by Ernest Guinness, as a wedding present for his daughter, Aileen Guinness, who married a cousin, Brinsley Sheridan Plunket. Aileen Plunket entertained on a grand scale. The castle became the site of hunt balls and other lavish social events. Her niece, Lady Caroline Blackwood wrote of growing up in that atmosphere in her book, Great Granny Webster.

=== Private consortia ===
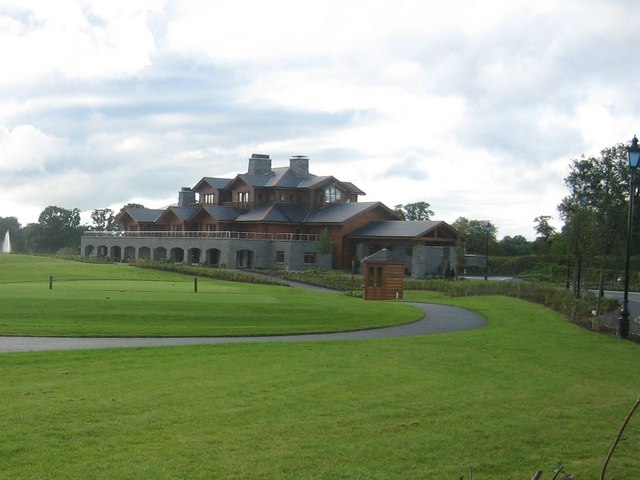
Luttrellstown Golf Club House

In 1983 it was sold to the private Swiss consortium Primwest controlled by the French businessman Didier Primat.

In 2006, it was bought outright by JP McManus and John Magnier. In 2007, more than €20 million was spent on major upgrade work, including improvements to the Steel and Mackenzie designed championship golf course and the "alpine style" clubhouse.

== House contents and furnishings ==
When the property was sold by Aileen Plunkett, the contents were also sold in September 1983 by Christie's of London. Desmond FitzGerald, 29th Knight of Glin, described the sale of the contents as being the Irish sale of the century.
