= Anne Horton =

Duchess of Cumberland and Strathearn (1743–1808)

- Duchess of Cumberland and Strathearn
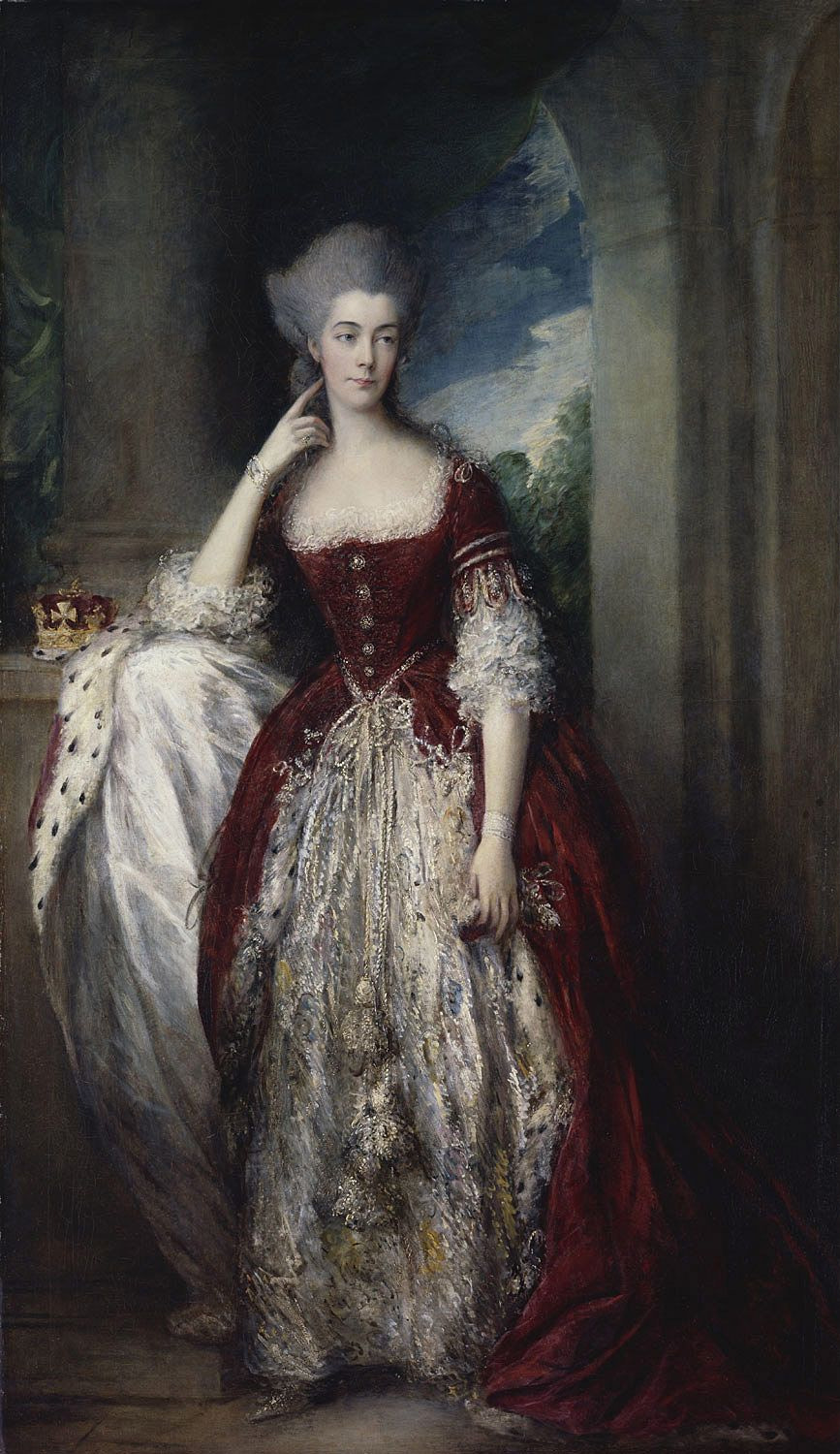
- Portrait by Thomas Gainsborough, 1773–77
- Born: Anne Luttrell; 24 January 1743; Marylebone, London, Kingdom of Great Britain
- Died: 28 December 1808 (aged 65); Trieste, Austrian Empire
- Spouse: Christopher Horton (m. 1765; died 1768) Prince Henry, Duke of Cumberland and Strathearn (m. 1771; died 1790)
- Father: Simon Luttrell, 1st Earl of Carhampton
- Mother: Judith Maria Lawes

Anne, Duchess of Cumberland and Strathearn (née Luttrell, later Horton; 24 January 1743 – 28 December 1808) was a member of the British royal family, the wife of Prince Henry, Duke of Cumberland and Strathearn, brother of King George III. Her sister was Lady Elizabeth Luttrell who was her companion and managed her home.

== Early life ==
Anne was born on 24 January 1743 in Marylebone, London, and baptised on 17 February 1742 at St Marylebone, Westminster. She was the daughter of Simon Luttrell, later first Earl of Carhampton, and his wife, Judith Maria Lawes, daughter of Sir Nicholas Lawes, Governor of Jamaica. Her younger sister and close companion, Elizabeth, was born on 3 February 1744 in London.

Her father was a Member of the House of Commons before being created Baron Irnham in 1768, Viscount Carhampton in 1781 and Earl of Carhampton in 1785.

== Marriages ==
Anne was first married to a Derbyshire gentleman, Christopher Horton (sometimes spelt Houghton) of Catton Hall, on 4 August 1765.

She was later widowed and married Prince Henry, Duke of Cumberland and Strathearn, the sixth child of Frederick, Prince of Wales, and Augusta of Saxe-Gotha, and a younger brother of George III. Their marriage took place at Hertford Street in Mayfair, London on 2 October 1771.

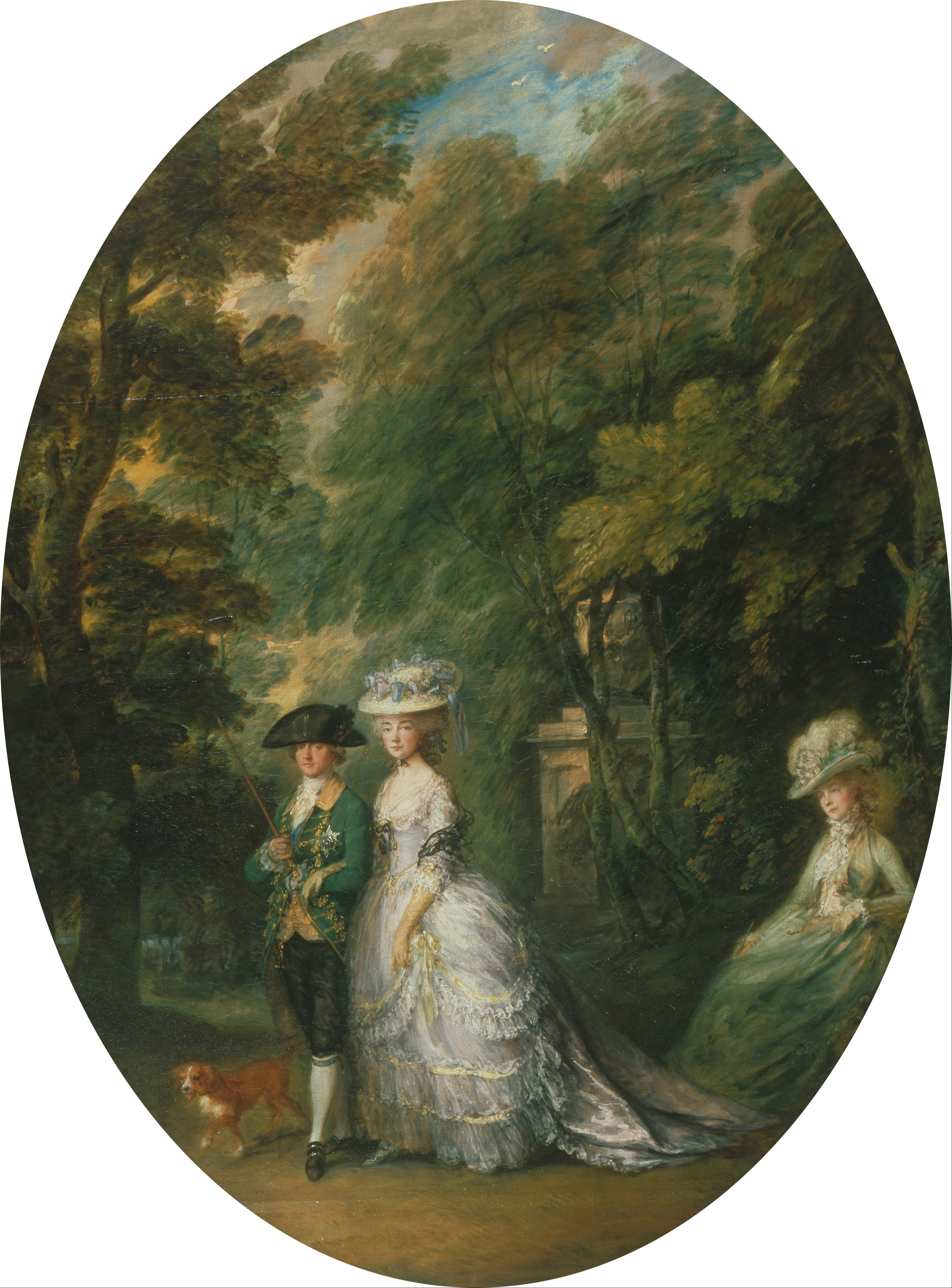
Thomas Gainsborough's painting of Henry, Duke of Cumberland, with the Duchess of Cumberland and Lady Elizabeth Luttrell in attendance

George III did not approve of the marriage as Anne was a commoner and previously married. He later had the Royal Marriages Act 1772 passed to prevent any descendant of George II marrying without the consent of the sovereign, a law which remained in effect until the passage of the Succession to the Crown Act 2013, which, in addition to several other modifications, limited the requirement to obtain royal consent to only the first six persons in line to the throne (rather than all descendants). As the Act's provisions could not be applied retroactively, Anne and the Duke's marriage was considered valid.

The Cumberlands moved to York House, renamed Cumberland House, on Pall Mall and lived there until the Duke's death in 1790. The house became an alternative court as the Duke was in open dispute with his mother and brother. The court was successful and Anne's sister Elizabeth Luttrell took a good share of the credit. She had been a witness at her sister's secret wedding and the couple had given her her own wing of Cumberland House. The Duke's finances were maintained by gambling tables at their home and Elizabeth managed them successfully.

In 1800, the widowed Duchess surrendered it to the banks who held mortgages on it.

== Character and appearance ==
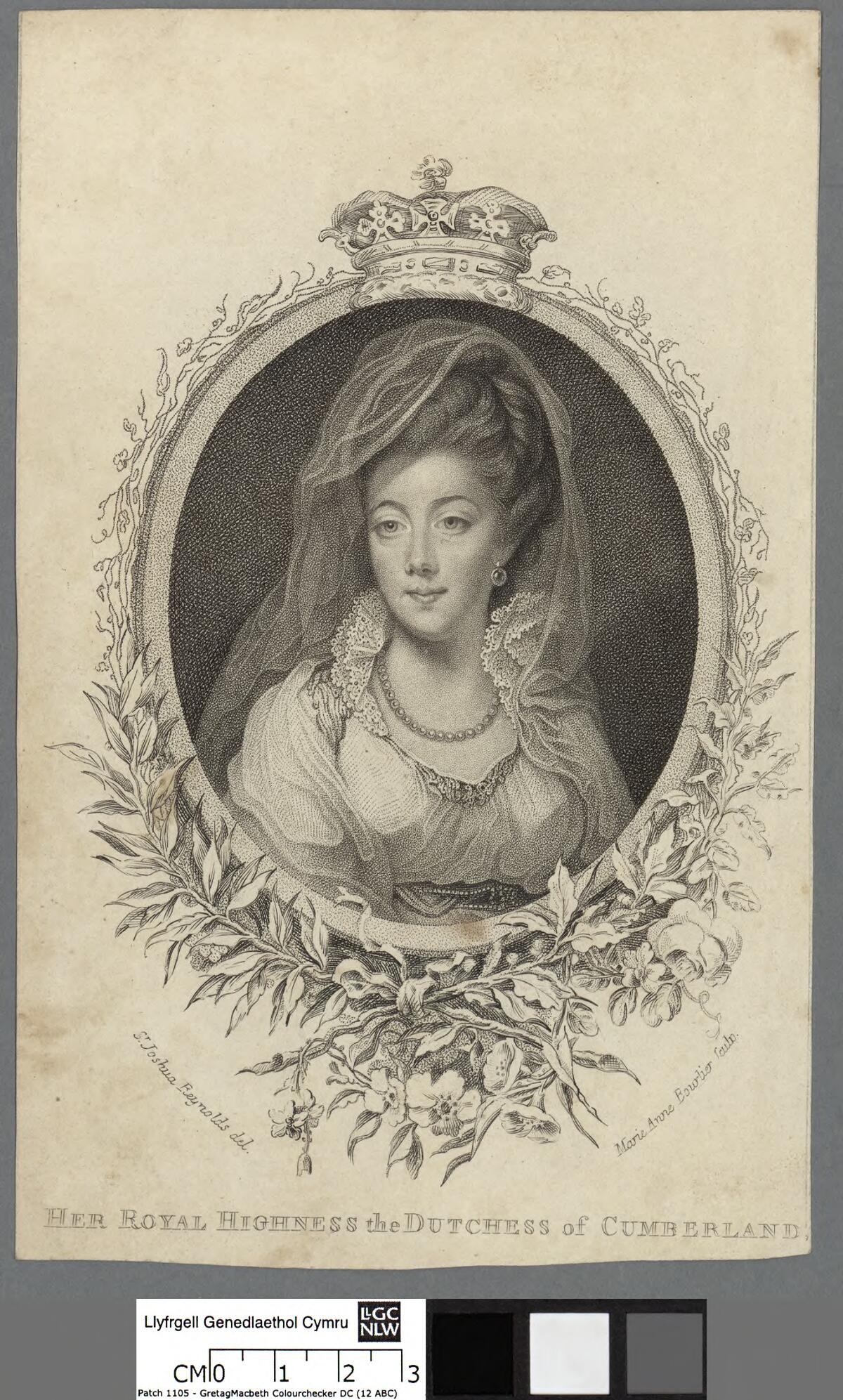
Portrait by Marie Anne Bourlier, c. 1800–12

Horace Walpole wrote "her coquetry was so active, so varied and yet so habitual, that it was difficult not to see through it and yet as difficult to resist it". While she was considered a great beauty, Walpole thought her merely "pretty", except for her green eyes, which he admitted were enchanting. That her eyes were remarkably expressive is confirmed by the several portraits of Anne by Thomas Gainsborough, one of which is in the Hugh Lane collection.
