= Luttrell =

Luttrell can refer to:

== People ==
- Alexander Luttrell (disambiguation), various
- Erica Luttrell, voice-over actress
- Francis Luttrell (disambiguation), various
- Geoffrey de Luterel (c. 1157–1218)
- Geoffrey Luttrell (1276–1345)
- Henry Luttrell, several persons
- Henry Luttrell (c. 1765–1851)
- Henry Lawes Luttrell, 2nd Earl of Carhampton (1743–1821)
- Hugh Luttrell (MP, died 1428), English officer of the Hundred Years' War
- James Luttrell (c. 1751–1788), British naval officer and MP
- John Luttrell, various
- John Luttrell (soldier), 16th English soldier in Scotland.
- John Luttrell-Olmius, 3rd Earl of Carhampton (1741–1829),
- Narcissus Luttrell, English diarist
- Marcus Luttrell, Author, United States Navy SEAL
- Morgan Luttrell, United States representative from Texas
- Rachel Luttrell, actress
- Robert Luttrell – Lord Chancellor of Ireland from 1236 to 1246. Treasurer of St Patrick's Cathedral. Married into the Plunkett family.
- Sidney and Alfred Luttrell (1865–1924 and 1872–1932), New Zealand architects and building contractors
- Simon Luttrell, 1st Earl of Carhampton (1713–1787)
- Terry Luttrell (born 1946), American singer-songwriter
- Thomas Luttrell (disambiguation), various including:
  - Sir Thomas Luttrell (?-died 1554), Chief Justice of Common Pleas, Solicitor General
  - Thomas Luttrell of Luttrellstown (1634-1674), Father of Henry Luttrell, Simon Luttrell

== Places ==
- Luttrellstown Dublin, Ireland
- Luttrellstown Castle Dublin, Ireland
- Luttrell, Ohio
- Luttrell, Tennessee

== Things ==
- Luttrell Psalter – illuminated manuscript created circa 1325–1335
