= John Langston (MP) =

British politician

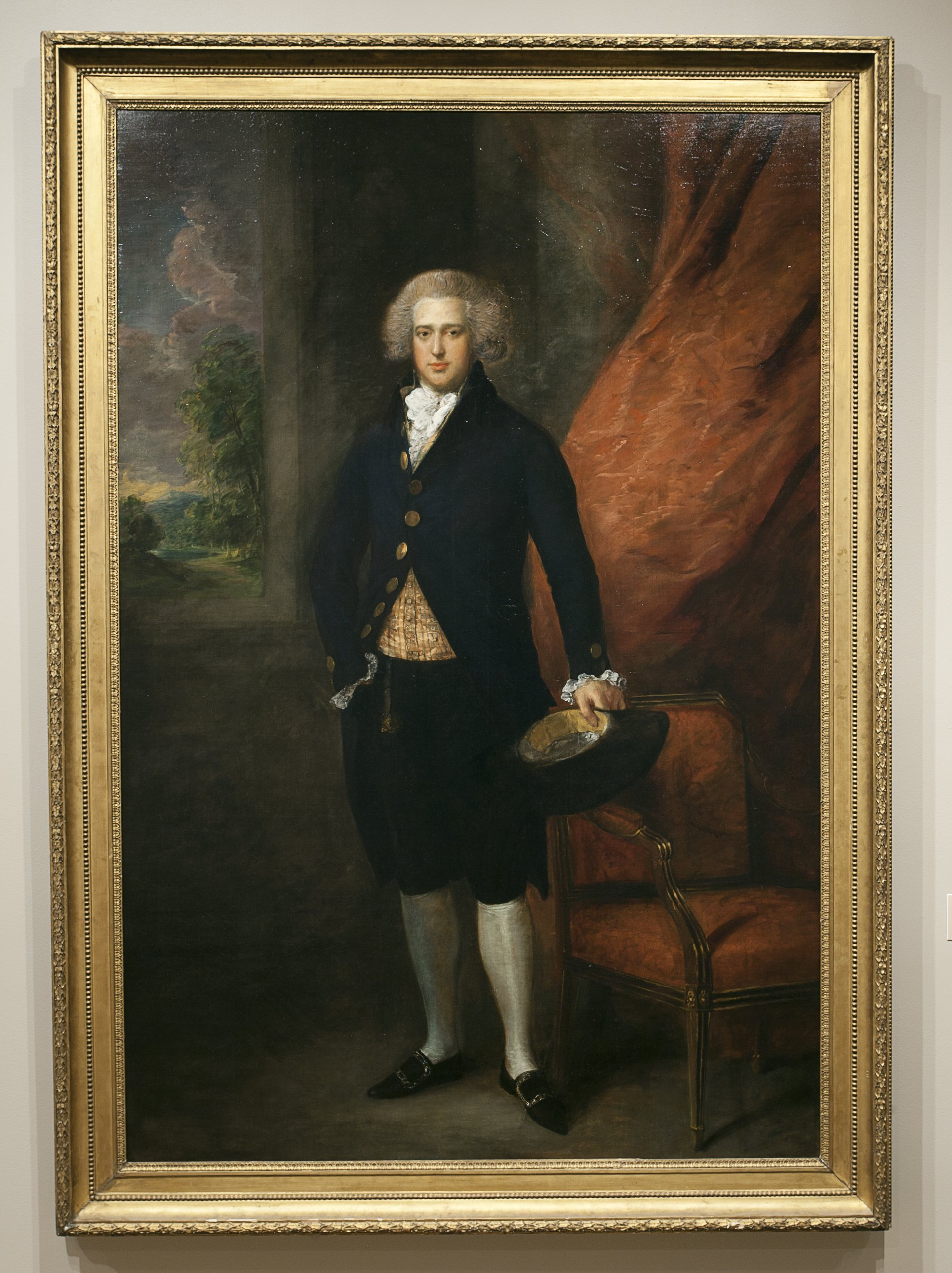
Portrait of John Langston by Thomas Gainsborough, 1787

John Langston (c. 1758 – 18 February 1812) was an English merchant banker and politician. He sat in the House of Commons of Great Britain and its successor the House of Commons of the United Kingdom for most of the years between 1784 and 1807.

== Early life and family ==
Langston was the oldest son of James Langston and his wife Sarah, of Sarsden House in Oxfordshire.

In 1784 he married Sarah Goddard, daughter of John Goddard of Woodford Hall, Essex. They had one son (James Langston) and four daughters.

== Inheritance ==
Langston was probably educated at Eton. He had a generous inheritance from his father, who died in 1795. As well as being a wine merchant in London, James Langston was a deputy governor of the Bank of England and founder of the merchant bank of Langston, Towgood and Amory. John inherited a partnership in the bank, shares in the British East India Company, the Sarsden and Churchill estates in Oxfordshire, and £300,000 (equivalent to £39.1 million in 2023).

== Career ==
Langston was a director of the Sun Fire Office from 1794 until his death. He aimed to buy himself a place in Parliament, but never found a safe seat. At the 1784 election he was returned after a contest as a Member of Parliament (MP) for Sudbury, an open borough with a reputation for venality where the government backed his candidacy.

At the next election, in 1790, he contested Bridgwater in the interest of the 4th Earl Poulett. The Earl of Egmont had funded his son Viscount Perceval to contest the seat, but Langston and Poulett's brother Vere won by a comfortable margin.

Having joined the opposition, Langston was no longer acceptable to Poulett, so he turned instead to Minehead, where opposition was mounting to the "overbearing conduct" of the borough's patron John Fownes Luttrell, whose Dunster Castle-based family had dominated the borough for most of the period since its 16th-century enfranchisement. Langston bought some building land in Alcombe, within the borough, from a Quaker William Davis who had advertised for a wealthy challenger. There he rapidly built some houses to register voters, and nominated himself and his wife's brother-in-law Admiral Charles Morice Pole. At the election in 1796 John Fownes Lutrell held his own seat, but Langston defeated his brother Thomas Fownes Luttrell.

Luttrell rallied his support by the next election in 1802, and defeated Langston, whose illegal treating of voters after the arrival of the writ, had not been enough to win. An election petition was prepared, but after a period of negotiations, Langston sold all his Minehead interests to Fownes Luttrell.

Out of Parliament, Langston was Sheriff of Oxfordshire in 1804–05. He was returned to the Commons in March 1806 for the Irish rotten borough of Portarlington, whose patron the 2nd Earl of Portarlington accommodated Langston as a favour to the Prince of Wales.

At the general election in 1806, Langston returned to Bridgwater, where he won a contested election with Vere Poulett again returned as his running-mate. However, by 1807 the earl had disowned his brother's politics, and Langston withdrew.

Langston never returned to Parliament, and died in 1812, aged about 54.

Parliament of Great Britain
Preceded by Sir Patrick Blake; Sir James Marriott	Member of Parliament for Sudbury; 1784 – 1790; With: William Smith	Succeeded by John Coxe Hippisley; Thomas Champion Crespigny
Preceded by Robert Thornton; Alexander Hood	Member of Parliament for Bridgwater; 1790 – 1796; With: Hon. Vere Poulett	Succeeded by Jeffreys Allen; George Pocock
Preceded by Thomas Fownes Luttrell; John Fownes Luttrell	Member of Parliament for Minehead; 1796 – 1800; With: John Fownes Luttrell	Succeeded by Parliament of the United Kingdom
Parliament of the United Kingdom
Preceded by Parliament of Great Britain	Member of Parliament for Minehead; 1801 – 1802; With: John Fownes Luttrell	Succeeded by John Patteson; John Fownes Luttrell
Preceded by Thomas Tyrwhitt	Member of Parliament for Portarlington; March 1806 – November 1806	Succeeded by Sir Oswald Mosley, Bt
Preceded by John Hudleston; George Pocock	Member of Parliament for Bridgwater; 1806 – 1807; With: Hon. Vere Poulett	Succeeded by William Astell; George Pocock
