= John Luttrell =

John Luttrell may refer to:

- Sir John Luttrell (soldier) (c. 1518–1551), English soldier and courtier
  - John Luttrell (painting), a 1550 painting by Hans Eworth
- John Luttrell (1566–1620), English lawyer and politician, MP for Minehead 1586–1589
- John K. Luttrell (1831–1893), U.S. Representative from California
- John Fownes Luttrell (1752–1816) of Dunster Castle, MP for Minehead 1774–1806 and 1807–16
- John Fownes Luttrell (1787–1857) of Dunster Castle, MP for Minehead 1812–32

== See also ==
- John Lutterell (died 1335), English medieval philosopher, theologian, and university chancellor
- Feudal barony of Dunster
