= Thomas Fownes Luttrell =

English officer and Tory politician

Thomas Fownes Luttrell (10 February 1763 – 19 January 1811) from Dunster Castle in Somerset was an English officer in the British Army and briefly a Tory politician. Like many previous generations of Luttrells since the 16th century, he was a Member of Parliament (MP) for Minehead, his family's pocket borough near Dunster.

== Early life and family ==
Fownes Luttrell was the fifth surviving son of Henry Fownes Luttrell I (formerly Henry Fownes, c. 1722–1780). His mother Margaret was the daughter of Alexander Luttrell (1705–1737), who had bequeathed his estates to Margaret on condition that her husband take the surname Luttrell.

In 1782 Fownes Luttrell married Catherine Browne, daughter of John Cave Browne of Stretton-en-le-Field in Leicestershire. They had no children.

== Career ==
Fownes Luttrell was educated at Blundell's School in Devon from 1772 to 1775. He then joined the British Army, becoming a lieutenant in the 89th Foot in 1783. He transferred to the 49th Foot in 1783, and was promoted to captain in 1787. He was lieutenant colonel of the Somerset Fencibles from 1795 to 1801.

After his father's death in 1780, his oldest brother John had succeeded to the family estates, including control of Minehead's parliamentary representation. John had been returning himself to Parliament since 1774, and had continued his father's habit of renting the second seat to a government supporter. A vacancy arose in 1795 when Viscount Parker succeeded to the peerage, and John then nominated his younger brother Thomas, who was in poor health after returning from service in the West Indies. Thomas was returned unopposed at the by-election in March 1795, but was defeated at the general election, in May 1796. The London banker John Langston had purchased land in the borough on which he had built houses, and set out challenge the Luttrell interest. After Langston's defeat in 1802 a deal was reached whereby John Fownes Luttrell purchased all of Langston's property in the borough, and Luttrell control was restored.

Thomas's made no mark during his year in the House of Commons. After his defeat, John tried lobbied William Pitt to promote Thomas to a higher rank in the army. This was unsuccessful, and ill-health forced him to retire from full-time army service in 1801.

He then became a Commissioner of the Lottery.

== See also ==
- Feudal barony of Dunster

Parliament of Great Britain
Preceded by Viscount Parker; John Fownes Luttrell	Member of Parliament for Minehead; 1795–1796; With: John Fownes Luttrell	Succeeded by John Fownes Luttrell; John Langston
