= John Douglas (died 1838) =

John Douglas (1 February 1774 – 31 July 1838) was an English Tory politician. He was the son of Thomas Douglas of Grantham, a wealthy landowner, and Harriot Lucke.

He was a member of parliament (MP) for Orford 1818 – April 1821 and for Minehead 12 April 1822 – 1826.

To escape his creditors, Douglas, a Turf enthusiast, went to Sweden where his brother-in-law, Benjamin Bloomfield, 1st Baron Bloomfield, was envoy, remaining there to 1835.

Parliament of the United Kingdom
Preceded by Edmund Alexander Macnaghten; Charles Arbuthnot	Member of Parliament for Orford; 1818 – 1821; With: Edmund Alexander Macnaghten to March 1820; Horace Seymour March–May 1820; Edmund Alexander Macnaghten from May 1820	Succeeded by Edmund Alexander Macnaghten; The Marquess of Londonderry
Preceded by John Fownes Luttrell, junior Henry Fownes Luttrell	Member of Parliament for Minehead; 1822 – 1826; With: John Fownes Luttrell, junior	Succeeded by John Fownes Luttrell, junior James Blair
