= Henry Luttrell =

Henry Luttrell may refer to:

- Henry Luttrell (Jacobite commander) (c. 1655–1717), Jacobite commander in Ireland who joined the Williamites after Limerick
- Henry Fownes Luttrell (died 1780) (c. 1722–1780) of Dunster Castle, High Sheriff of Somerset 1754–55, Member of Parliament (MP) for Minehead 1768–74
- Henry Luttrell, 2nd Earl of Carhampton (1743–1821), grandson of the Jacobite, opponent of John Wilkes
- Henry Luttrell (wit) (c. 1765–1851), wit and poet, illegitimate son of the 2nd Earl of Carhampton
- Henry Fownes Luttrell (1790–1867), MP for Minehead 1816–22
