= Alexander Luttrell =

Alexander Luttrell may refer to:

- Alexander Luttrell (died 1642), MP for Minehead 1640–42
- Alexander Luttrell (1663–1711), MP for Minehead 1690–1708
- Alexander Luttrell (1705–1737), MP for Minehead 1727–37

== See also ==
- Feudal barony of Dunster
