= James Blair (MP) =

Irish planter and politician (1788–1841)

- Born: c. 1788
- Died: 9 September 1841
- Occupations: Planter, politician
- Spouse: Elizabeth Catherine Stopford
- Parent: John Blair
- Relatives: Lambert Blair (paternal uncle); Edward Stopford (father-in-law); William Henry Stopford (brother-in-law)

James Blair (c. 1788 – 9 September 1841) was an Irish planter and politician. He entered the Parliament of the United Kingdom as a Tory in 1818 to protect the interests of the West Indian planter class. Blair sat in the House of Commons from 1818 to 1830, and later from 1837 to 1841. When slave owners in the British Empire were compensated for the abolition of slavery in Britain's colonies in 1833, Blair received the biggest single compensation payment.

== Early life ==
Blair was born in County Armagh, Ireland into an Ulster-Scots family c. 1788. He was the son of John Blair, who descended from a Scottish family that immigrated to Ireland from Wigtownshire, which was where the family businesses were located.

== Plantation owner ==
In 1815, his father's brother Lambert Blair left his South American estates jointly to James Blair and his cousin John MacEamon (or MacCamon). These included sugar and cotton plantations in Berbice, Demerara and Surinam.

In 1833, Parliament passed the Slavery Abolition Act, which abolished slavery throughout the British Empire. The Act reconciled two central principles of 19th-century classical liberalism – human liberty and private property – by paying compensation to slave-owners for the loss of their property. The sum allocated in the Act was £20 million, which amounted to 40% of the United Kingdom's annual budget. Owners submitted separate claims for their slave-holdings on separate plantations, and the largest single claim came from Blair. (Others such as John Gladstone made multiple claims which reached a higher total.) For the 1,598 slaves he owned on the Blairmont plantation he had inherited in British Guyana, Blair was awarded £83,530 8 shillings and 11 pennies (equivalent to £9,590,000 in 2023).

== Career in Parliament ==
At the 1818 general election, Blair bought a seat in Parliament, in the rotten borough of Saltash in Devon. That seat was bought for one Parliament only from Michael George Prendergast, who had purchased a life interest from the borough's owner James Buller.

At the 1820 general election, Blair was returned for another rotten borough, this time Aldeburgh in Suffolk. It was owned by the Lancashire ironmaster Samuel Walker, who had bought it in 1818 for £39,000 (equivalent to £3.6 million in 2023).

Blair had entered Parliament to defend the slave plantations, and while he voted on conventional Tory lines, he did not speak in the Commons until March 1824, in the debates which followed the Demerara rebellion of 1823. He opposed measures to improve the living and working conditions of slaves. He told the house that the slaves were "as mildly and as humanely managed in Demerara, as in the Islands, or as is compatible with a state of slavery and pressure" and that "there can be no doubt that the revolt in Demerara is to be attributed to the debates which took place in this House last year, and to the notice preceding them". His only other contribution to Parliamentary debates was in 1825, when he supported retaining the preferential tariff on sugar imported from the West Indies. He had been an active member of the London Society of West India Planters and Merchants, attending 33 meetings between 1824 -1829.

Walker's interest in Aldeburgh had been sold in 1822, and at the 1826 election Blair was returned for Minehead in the Fownes Luttrell interest. He continued to take a Tory line, voting against repeal of the Test Acts, against Jewish emancipation, and against Catholic emancipation.

He stood down at the 1830 general election, with hopes of a seat in Wigtownshire. However, he did not return to the Commons for seven years.

Blair did not contest the Wigtownshire seat until 1835, when he was defeated by the incumbent Sir Andrew Agnew, Bt. Agnew retired at the 1837 election, when Blair won the seat by 362 votes to 314 of the Whig Alexander Murray. At the general election in August, Blair lost his seat to the Whig John Hamilton Dalrymple.

== Personal life ==
In 1815, he married Elizabeth Catherine Stopford, youngest daughter of Major-General Edward Stopford (died 1796; not to be confused with his nephew Lieut-General Edward Stopford). In 1825, he bought the Penninghame estate in Wigtownshire from a merchant whose business had failed. The estate included the lands of Penninghame, Castle Stewart and Fintalloch.

== Death ==
Blair died less than a month after his defeat in the 1841 election at about age fifty-three. His will ran to 46 pages and made many bequests, to a total value of £300,000 (equivalent to £27.7 million in 2023).

The bulk of his wealth, including the Penninghame estate, was bequeathed to his brother-in-law Colonel William Henry Stopford, an officer in the Royal Artillery. In 1842, Stopford changed his name to Stopford-Blair, and incorporated the Blair coat of arms in his own.

Parliament of the United Kingdom
Preceded by Matthew Russell; Michael George Prendergast	Member of Parliament for Saltash; 1818 – 1820; With: Matthew Russell	Succeeded by Matthew Russell; Michael George Prendergast
Preceded by Joshua Walker; Samuel Walker	Member of Parliament for Aldeburgh; 1820 – 1826; With: Joshua Walker	Succeeded by Joshua Walker; John Wilson Croker
Preceded by John Douglas; John Fownes Luttrell, junior	Member of Parliament for Minehead; 1826 – 1830; With: John Fownes Luttrell, junior	Succeeded by William Edward Tomline; John Fownes Luttrell, junior
Preceded by Sir Andrew Agnew, Bt	Member of Parliament for Wigtownshire; 1837 – 1841	Succeeded by John Dalrymple
