= John Fownes Luttrell (1752–1816) =

British politician

John Fownes Luttrell MP
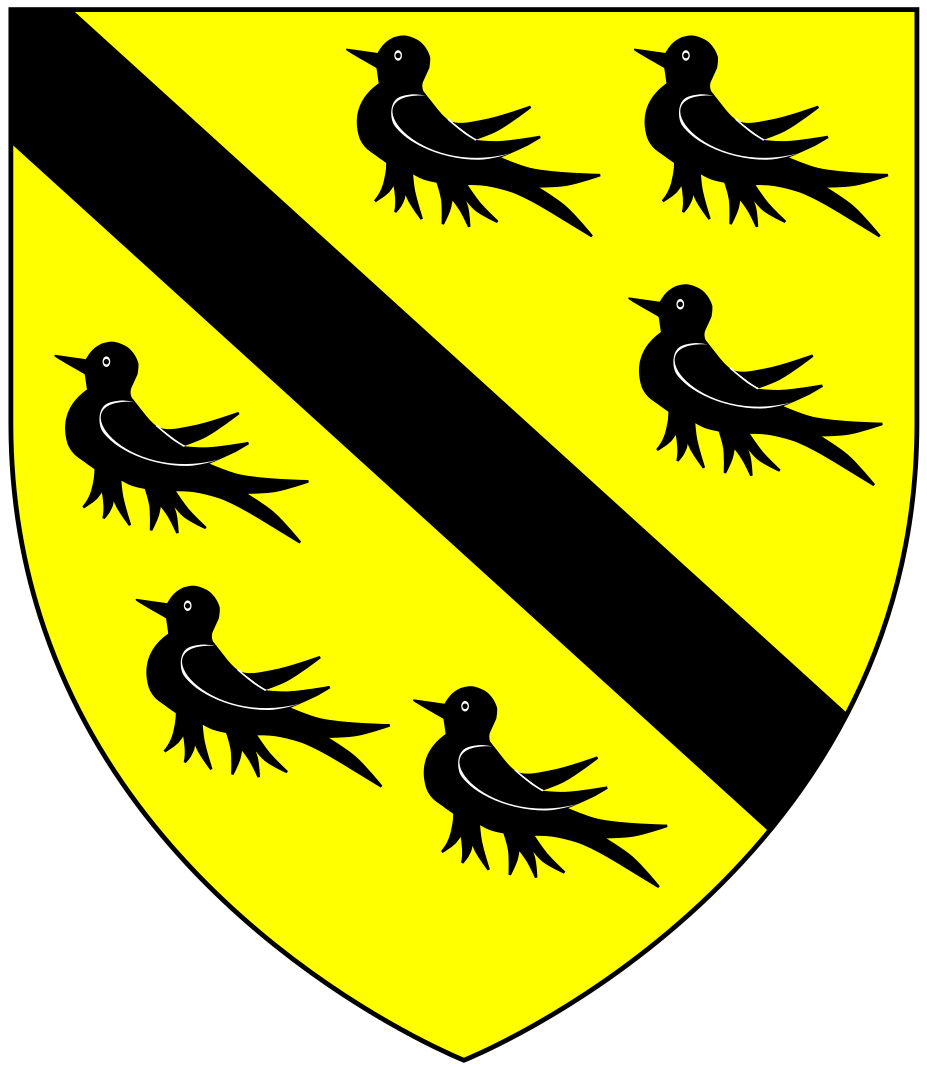
- Luttrell Coat of Arms

Member of Parliament for Minehead
- In office 1774–1800

Personal details
- Born: 1752 Dunster, Somerset, England
- Died: 16 February 1816 (aged 63–64) Dunster, Somerset, England
- Resting place: Priory Churchyard of St. George, Dunster, Somerset, England
- Spouse(s): Mary Drewe, 1782
- Children: Four daughters and five sons
- Parent(s): Henry Fownes Luttrell (1722-1780) and Margaret Luttrell
- Occupation: Landowner

John Fownes Luttrell (1752 – 16 February 1816) was an English Tory politician from Dunster Castle in Somerset. Like many previous generations of Luttrells since the 16th century, he was a Member of Parliament (MP) for Minehead, his family's pocket borough near Dunster. He sat in the House of Commons of Great Britain and then in the House of Commons of the United Kingdom from 1774 until his death in 1816, except for a few months in 1806–07.

== Early life and family ==
Fownes Luttrell was the oldest son of Henry Fownes Luttrell I (formerly Henry Fownes, c. 1722–1780). His mother Margaret was the daughter of Alexander Luttrell (1705–1737), who had bequeathed his estates to Margaret on condition that her husband take the surname Luttrell.

On 2 August 1782 Fownes Luttrell married Mary Drewe, daughter of Francis Drewe of The Grange, Devon. They had 5 sons and four daughters, including:

- John Fownes Luttrell (1787–1857), MP for Minehead
- Henry Fownes Luttrell (1790–1867), MP for Minehead
- Francis, an army captain
- Alexander, a Church of England minister (died 1888 aged 95)who became rector of East Quantoxhead
- Thomas, a Church of England minister (died 1871 aged 77), curate of Dunster
- Mary-Anne Fownes Luttrell (1783-1835)
- Margaret Fownes Luttrell (1784-1858)
- Charlotte Fownes Luttrell (1786-1791)
- Harriet Fownes Luttrell (1788-1870)

== Career ==
At the 1774 general election, Fownes Luttrell was elected as one of the two Members of Parliament (MPs) for Minehead, his family's pocket borough. The borough's second seat was held by his father, who had secured Lord North's support for unopposed Luttrell patronage of the borough with an expectation that one candidate would be a North nominee. Henry Fownes Luttrell therefore promptly vacated his seat in favour of North's candidate, former Governor Thomas Pownall.

Henry Fownes Luttrell continued the pattern of reserving one seat for his son and selling the other to government supporter until his death in 1780. John then succeeded his father and continued the practice of returning himself and a purchaser, until a vacancy arose in 1795 when Viscount Parker succeeded to the peerage. John then nominated his younger brother Thomas, an army officer, who was returned unopposed. However, John's "overbearing" conduct led to a contest at the 1796 general election, when Thomas was defeated by the London banker John Langston, who had purchased land in the borough. Fownes Luttrell's allies in Minehead then planned the eviction of tenants who had failed to support the family, but Langston persisted and contested the seat again in 1802, but was defeated. An election petition was prepared, but after prolonged negotiations a deal was reached whereby the petition was dropped and Fownes Luttrell purchased all of Langston's property in the borough.

Fownes Luttrell intended to return himself again in 1806, but after his treating voters extended into the period when that was forbidden, he withdrew in favour of his friend Sir John Lethbridge. Lethbridge soon resigned the seat, and Fownes Luttrell was returned unopposed at a by-election in January 1807. At the general election in May 1807 there was a challenge from Thomas Bowes, brother of the Earl of Strathmore. However Bowes withdrew part way through polling, There were no further contests in the borough until it was disenfranchised under the Reform Act 1832.

At the next election, in 1812, Fownes Luttrell returned himself and his oldest son and heir John Fownes Luttrell II. They sat together until the father's death in 1816, when his seat was taken by the second son, Henry.

== See also ==
- Feudal barony of Dunster

Parliament of Great Britain
Preceded by Sir Charles Whitworth; Henry Fownes Luttrell I	Member of Parliament for Minehead; 1774–1800; With: Henry Fownes Luttrell I to December 1774; Thomas Pownall December 1774 – 1780; Francis Fownes Luttrell 1780–83; Henry Beaufoy 1783–84; Hon. Charles Phipps 1784–86; Robert Wood 1786–90; Viscount Parker 1790–95; Thomas Fownes Luttrell 1795–96; John Langston from 1796	Succeeded by Parliament of the United Kingdom
Parliament of the United Kingdom
Preceded by Parliament of Great Britain	Member of Parliament for Minehead; 1801–1806; With: John Langston to 1802; John Patteson 1802–06	Succeeded by The Lord Rancliffe; Sir John Lethbridge, Bt
Preceded by The Lord Rancliffe; Sir John Lethbridge, Bt	Member of Parliament for Minehead; January 1807–1816; With: The Lord Rancliffe to May 1807; John Denison May 1807 – 1812; John Fownes Luttrell II from 1812	Succeeded by John Fownes Luttrell II; Henry Fownes Luttrell II
