= Littrell =

Littrell is a surname. Notable people with the surname include:

- Brian Littrell (born 1975), American singer-songwriter, member of the Backstreet Boys
- Gary L. Littrell (born 1944), retired United States Army Command Sergeant Major who received the Medal of Honor
- Jack Littrell (1929–2009), Major League Baseball shortstop in the 1950s
- Littrell (full name: Lindsay Littrell) (born 1980), singer/songwriter, scholar and educator

== See also ==
- Littorella
- Luttrell (disambiguation)
- Luttrellia
