= Henry Fownes Luttrell (1790–1867) =

Henry Fownes Luttrell (7 February 1790 – 6 October 1867) was an English lawyer and Tory politician from Dunster Castle in Somerset. He sat in the House of Commons of the United Kingdom from 1816 to 1822.

Fownes Luttrell was the second surviving son of John Fownes Luttrell I (1752–1816). His mother Mary was a daughter of Francis Drewe of The Grange, Broadhembury, Devon. He was educated at Eton and at Brasenose College, Oxford, and called to the bar at the Middle Temple in 1813.

His father died on 16 February 1816, and on 12 March Henry was elected unopposed to his father's parliamentary seat as member of parliament (MP) for Minehead. The seat was a pocket borough which had been dominated since the 16th century by the Luttrell family, who owned the feudal barony of Dunster. Successive generations of Lutrells had used the borough to elect themselves and their allies or paying guests, and Fownes Luttrell's older brother John Fownes Luttrell II had held the borough's second seat since 1812.

The Fownes Luttrell brothers were re-elected unopposed in 1818 and 1820, but Henry resigned his seat in 1822 to become a Commissioner of the Board of Audit.

His brother John died in 1857, when Henry succeeded to the Dunster Castle estates which John had inherited from their father's estate. They covered more than 15,000 acres (6,100 ha), and at the time yielded an income of over £20,000 per annum (equivalent to £2.41 million in 2023).

Henry died unmarried on 6 October 1867, aged 77.

== See also ==
- Feudal barony of Dunster

Parliament of the United Kingdom
Preceded by John Fownes Luttrell I John Fownes Luttrell, II	Member of Parliament for Minehead; 1816–1822; With: John Fownes Luttrell, II	Succeeded by John Douglas; John Fownes Luttrell, II
