= Vere Poulett =

Lieutenant-General Vere Poulett (May 1761 – 15 March 1812) was a British soldier and politician. He was a younger son of Vere Poulett, 3rd Earl Poulett, and Mary, daughter of Richard Butt.

== Life ==
Poulett joined the army during the American War of Independence and was an ensign in the 62nd Foot. When the 85th Foot was raised on 14 September 1779 he was transferred to it in the rank of lieutenant. The regiment was sent to garrison Jamaica. Poulett was promoted to captain on 10 July 1781. On 30 October that year he was appointed captain of one of the additional companies attached to the 29th Foot. By 1783 he had become a major in the 99th Foot (the Jamaica Regiment) and on 9 August 1783 he transferred to the 56th Foot in the same rank when the 99th was disbanded at the end of the war.

Poulett was returned to parliament for Bridgwater in 1790, a seat he held until 1796 and again between 1806 and 1807.

On the outbreak of the French Revolutionary War, Poulett purchased a lieutenant-colonelcy in the 60th Foot (Royal Americans) on 13 May 1793. He commanded the 2nd Battalion, which was stationed in Canada, until March 1796 when he retired onto the half-pay of an independent company, and was promoted to brevet colonel on 3 May.

In retirement Poulett received promotion by seniority to major-general on 29 April 1802. On the outbreak of the Napoleonic Wars he raised the 2nd (Middle) Buckinghamshire Volunteer Corps for home defence. He took the rank of lieutenant-colonel commandant on 27 August 1803 and had three battalions of part-time volunteers under his command, drawn from the Hundreds of Aylesbury, Buckingham, and Cottesloe. During the summer of 1805 when Napoleon was massing his 'Army of England' at Boulogne for a projected invasion, Poulett was superintending all the Buckinghamshire Volunteer Infantry from his headquarters at Aylesbury. He received promotion by seniority to Lieutenant-General on 7 May 1808. That year the government created the Local Militia to counter the declining numbers of Volunteers. The remaining volunteer units were encouraged to transfer to the part-time new force, which trained in May each year to fit the farming cycle. Poulett was appointed to command the new 2nd (Middle) Regiment.

== Family and death ==
Poulett married Anne Lucy (née Becher). They had one son, who died young, and five daughters. One of their daughters, Anne Lucy Poulett, was the wife of George Nugent-Grenville, 2nd Baron Nugent. Poulett died in March 1812, aged 50.

Parliament of Great Britain
Preceded by Alexander Hood; Robert Thornton	Member of Parliament for Bridgewater; 1790–1796; With: John Langston	Succeeded by George Pocock; Jeffreys Allen
Parliament of the United Kingdom
Preceded by George Pocock; John Hudleston	Member of Parliament for Bridgewater; 1806–1807; With: John Langston	Succeeded by William Thornton Astell; George Pocock
