= Dominick Chester =

Dominick Chester (c. 1532— c. 1576) was the member of Parliament for the constituency of Minehead in the parliament of 1563.

The son of a Bristol merchant, he was the brother of Thomas Chester of Almondsbury. He died of the plague.
