= Henry Beaufoy =

British politician (1750–1795)

Henry Beaufoy (November 1750 – 17 May 1795) was a British Member of Parliament.

== Life ==
Beaufoy was the son of Quaker vinegar merchant Mark Beaufoy; after marrying, he conformed to the Church of England. He was educated at Hoxton Academy and Warrington Academy, going on to Edinburgh University in the early 1770s. He was a founder of Hackney College. He was elected a Fellow of the Royal Society in February 1782.

Beaufoy was returned as Member of Parliament (MP) for Minehead (1783–1784) and Great Yarmouth from 1784 until his death. He was a staunch advocate of the repeal of the Test and Corporation Acts, which limited the civil rights of non-members of the Church of England. He voted for abolition of the slave trade on 18 April 1791, but on 25 April 1792 announced his conversion to gradual abolition, in the hope that ‘the conclusions of my understanding may ultimately correspond with the dictates of my heart’. He expressed his fear that ‘too precipitate a benevolence augmented, while it hoped to have diminished, the sum of human calamity’, claiming that a cessation of the trade must aggravate the plight of the existing slave population of the West Indies, and that if it spelt ruin for the planters, no other country would abolish the trade and thereby destroy its colonies. He chaired the committees' of the House which on 1 May 1792 reported in favour of gradual abolition. The 1792 Slave Trade Bill passed the House of Commons mangled and mutilated by the modifications and amendments of Pitt, it lay for years, in the House of Lords. Biographer William Hague considers the unfinished abolition of the slave trade to be Pitt's greatest failure.

He was Secretary to the Board of Control in 1791–1793. He was a witness in John Horne Tooke's trial for high treason in 1794.

He supported parliamentary reform, religious toleration and was responsible for legislation which rehabilitated the British fishing industry. He supported shorter working hour (an eight-hour day) for employees, particularly railways employees. .

Beaufoy was buried in St Mary's, Ealing. He had married in 1778 Elizabeth Jenks, daughter of William Jenks of Shifnal: they had no children.

== Sources ==
- Hague, William (2005). William Pitt the Younger. HarperPerennial. ISBN 978-0-00-714720-5.

Parliament of Great Britain
Preceded by Francis Fownes-Luttrell; John Fownes Luttrell	Member of Parliament for Minehead; 1783–1784; With: John Fownes Luttrell	Succeeded by Charles Phipps; John Fownes Luttrell
Preceded by Richard Walpole; Charles Townshend	Member of Parliament for Great Yarmouth; 1784–1795; With: Sir John Jervis to 1790; Charles Townshend from 1790	Succeeded by Stephens Howe; Charles Townshend
