= George Parker, 4th Earl of Macclesfield =

British peer and politician

The Right Honourable The Earl of Macclesfield PC
- Arms of Parker, Earls of Macclesfield: Gules, a chevron between three leopard's faces or

Captain of the Yeomen of the Guard
- In office 1804 – 15 November 1830
- Monarchs: George III; George IV; William IV
- Prime Minister: William Pitt the Younger; The Lord Grenville; The Duke of Portland; Spencer Perceval; The Earl of Liverpool; George Canning; The Viscount Goderich; The Duke of Wellington
- Preceded by: The Lord Pelham
- Succeeded by: The Marquess of Clanricarde

Personal details
- Born: 24 February 1755
- Died: 20 March 1842 (aged 87)
- Spouse: Mary Frances Drake (m. 1780; died 1823)

George Parker, 4th Earl of Macclesfield PC (24 February 1755 – 20 March 1842), styled Viscount Parker between 1764 and 1795, was a British peer and politician who sat in the House of Commons between 1777 and 1795.

== Background ==
Macclesfield was the son of Thomas Parker, 3rd Earl of Macclesfield, and Mary, daughter of Sir William Heathcote, 1st Baronet.

== Political career ==
Macclesfield was returned to Parliament for Woodstock in 1777, a seat he held until 1784, and later represented Minehead between 1790 and 1795. In 1791 he was sworn of the Privy Council and appointed Comptroller of the Household, which he remained until 1797. In 1795 he succeeded his father in the earldom and entered the House of Lords. From 1804 to 1830 he held office as Captain of the Yeomen of the Guard under eight different prime ministers.

During the French Revolutionary War he raised the County Fencible Cavalry in Oxfordshire, later the Watlington Cavalry, precursor of the Oxfordshire Yeomanry, and was appointed its Captain on 20 June 1798.

He was elected a fellow of the Royal Society in November 1818.

== Family ==
Lord Macclesfield married Mary Frances, daughter of Reverend Thomas Drake, in 1780. She died in January 1823. Macclesfield died in March 1842, aged 87, and was succeeded in the earldom by his younger brother, Thomas.

== Canal and Park ==
Lord Macclesfield was a director of the Regent's Canal from 1812 and its chairman from 1816. He was appointed as a commissioner of the Crown Estate Paving Commission in August 1824. As chair of the canal company, he saw it through its most testing times as a variety of problems and obstacles had to be surmounted before the canal could be opened in 1820.

Parliament of Great Britain
Preceded by John Skynner; William Eden	Member of Parliament for Woodstock; 1777–1784; With: William Eden	Succeeded by Sir Henry Dashwood, Bt; Francis Burton
Preceded by John Fownes-Luttrell; Robert Wood	Member of Parliament for Minehead; 1790–1795; With: John Fownes-Luttrell	Succeeded by John Fownes-Luttrell; Thomas Fownes Luttrell
Political offices
Preceded by Dudley Ryder	Comptroller of the Household; 1791–1797	Succeeded by Lord Charles Somerset
Preceded by The Lord Pelham	Captain of the Yeomen of the Guard; 1804–1830	Succeeded by The Marquess of Clanricarde
Honorary titles
Preceded by The Duke of Marlborough	Lord Lieutenant of Oxfordshire; 1817–1842	Succeeded by The Duke of Marlborough
Peerage of Great Britain
Preceded by Thomas Parker	Earl of Macclesfield; 1795–1842	Succeeded by Thomas Parker
