= Francis Fownes Luttrell =

- Born: 9 February 1756
- Died: 24 April 1823 (aged 67)
- Education: Eton College, Queen's College, Oxford
- Occupation: politician
- Years active: 1780–1783
- Known for: MP, Minehead
- Spouse: Charlotte Drewe (m. 1788)
- Children: 5 sons, 7 daughters
- Parents: Henry Fownes Luttrell (né Fownes) (father); Margaret Fownes-Luttrell (mother)
- Awards: admitted to Middle Temple

Francis Fownes Luttrell (9 February 1756 – 24 April 1823) was a British politician who was a member of parliament for Minehead from 1780 to 1783. He was also a commissioner for Taxes and later for Customs, before serving as chair of the board of Customs from 1813 to 1819.

== Personal life ==
=== Early life ===
Fownes Luttrell was born on 9 February 1756, the third son of Henry Fownes Luttrell (né Fownes) and his wife, Margaret, the daughter and heiress of Alexander Luttrell of Dunster Castle. Henry Fownes added Luttrell to his surname on his marriage of Margaret Luttrell and became the proprietor or Dunster, as well as a number of other manors. He worked to consolidate his family's interest in the borough of Minehead, and, by 1774 effectively controlled both of that borough's seats in the House of Commons.

He was educated at Eton College, which he attended from 1771. He was admitted at Queen's College, Oxford, and matriculated in 1773. In 1782, he was admitted at the Middle Temple.

=== Family ===
He married, on 21 April 1788, Charlotte, third daughter of Francis Drewe of Grange in Devon. They had five sons and seven daughters, of which several died young or unmarried: Louisa Frances (1794–1817), Francis (born 1795; died young), Maria (1796–1820), and Mary Frances (1798–1872), Francis Wynne (1801–1820), Edward (born 1803; died young) and Edward (born 1806; died young). Of the remainder:

- Henry Fownes Luttrell (1789–1813). Educated at Westminster School and Christ Church, Oxford (matriculated, 1806, and received his BA degree, 1810). He was admitted to the Middle Temple in 1809 and later became Secretary to the Vice-Chancellor of England.
- Charlotte Fownes Luttrell (1790–1819). In 1810, she married the Venerable Charles Abel Moysey, Archdeacon of Bath.
- Anne Fownes Luttrell (1791–1846). She married Abel Moysey of Charterhouse Hinton in 1829.
- Caroline Fownes Luttrell (1793–1863). In 1823 she married Rear Admiral Henry Fanshawe (1778–1856), who served in the Russian Navy and then entered the Royal Navy in 1798. He served at the Blockade of Cadiz, 1797–1799, the expedition to Holland, 1799, and in Egypt in 1801.
- Marcia Fownes Luttrell (born 1799). She married Douglas Wynne Stuart (1801–1855) in 1842; he was the son of the Honourable Archibald Stuart (1771–1832), fourth son of Francis Stuart, 9th Earl of Moray (1737–1810). They had one son, Douglas Moray Stuart (born 1843).

Mrs Fownes Luttrell died on 27 April 1817.

== Political career and later life ==
By late 1774, the constituency of Minehead had fallen under the control of the Fownes Luttrell family of Dunster Castle. In 1780, Francis Fownes Luttrell was returned as the Member, in what one historian called a "stop gap". He voted with the Government in 1781, and for peace with America in 1782. He resigned his seat in 1783 in favour of Henry Beaufoy, who had paid him £3,000 for it. After his resignation, he was a Tax Commissioner from 1784 to 1793, and then moved to the Customs office, where he remained until 1819. He was created a DCL in 1793. He served as chairman of the board of Customs from 1813 to 1819, jointly with William Roe, and then retired from public office, being succeeded in that office by Richard Betenson Dean. He died on 24 April 1823.

== Likenesses ==
- Portrait of Francis Fownes Luttrell by Richard Phelps, chalk on paper, 1777, in the possession of the National Trust and housed at Dunster Castle, National Trust Collections, National Trust Inventory Number 726102.
- Portrait of an unknown gentleman, possibly Francis Fownes Luttrell, by Karl Anton Hickel, oil on canvas, 1793, in the possession of the National Trust and housed at Dunster Castle, BBC Your Paintings (see also National Trust Collections, National Trust Inventory Number 726117).

Parliament of Great Britain
Preceded by Thomas Pownall; John Fownes Luttrell	Member of Parliament for Minehead; 1780 – March 1783; With: John Fownes Luttrell	Succeeded by John Fownes Luttrell; Henry Beaufoy
Other offices
Preceded by William Roe; Richard Frewin	Chairman, Board of Customs; 1813–1819 with William Roe	Succeeded by Richard Betenson Dean
