= Thomas Luttrell =

Thomas Luttrell may refer to:

- Thomas Luttrell (died 1571), English politician from Dunster Castle, Member of Parliament (MP) for Minehead 1563
- Thomas Luttrell (1583–1644) (1583–1644), English politician from Dunster Castle, MP for Minehead 1625
- Sir Thomas Luttrell (Irish judge) (died 1554), Anglo Irish lawyer, Chief Justice of Common Pleas, Solicitor General
- Thomas Fownes Luttrell (1763–1811) from Dunster Castle, English officer in the British Army, MP for Minehead 1795–96

== See also ==
- Feudal barony of Dunster
