= Francis Luttrell =

Francis Luttrell may refer to:

- Francis Luttrell (1628–1666), MP for Minehead 1660–66
- Francis Luttrell (1659–1690), MP for Minehead 1679–90
- Francis Fownes Luttrell (1756–1823), MP for Minehead 1780–83

== See also ==
- Feudal barony of Dunster
