= Minehead (constituency) =

Former parliamentary constituency in the United Kingdom

- Former borough constituency for the House of Commons

1563–1832
- Seats: Two

Minehead was a parliamentary borough in Somerset, forming part of the town of Minehead, which elected two Members of Parliament (MPs) to the House of Commons from 1563 until 1832, when the borough was abolished by the Great Reform Act.

== Members of Parliament ==
=== MPs 1563–1629 ===
- Constituency probably established 1563

Parliament	First member	Second member
Parliament of 1563-1567	Thomas Luttrell	Thomas Fitzwilliams
Parliament of 1571	John Colles	Thomas Mallett
Parliament of 1572-1581	Dominick Chester	Richard Cabell
1578	Andrew Hemmerford	Richard Cabell
1582	George Luttrell	Richard Cabell
Parliament of 1584-1585	George Luttrell	Edward Rogers
Parliament of 1586-1587	John Luttrell	Robert Crosse
Parliament of 1588-1589	John Luttrell	Benedict Barnham
Parliament of 1593	Richard Hanbury	James Quirke
Parliament of 1597-1598	Amias Bampfield (sat for Devon, replaced)	Conrad Prowse
Parliament of 1601	Dr Francis James	Lewis Lashbrooke
Parliament of 1604-1611	Sir Ambrose Turville	Sir Maurice Berkeley
Addled Parliament (1614)	No return made	
Parliament of 1621-1622	Francis Pearce	Sir Robert Lloyd
Happy Parliament (1624-1625)	Dr Arthur Duck	Sir Arthur Lake
Useless Parliament (1625)	Thomas Luttrell	Charles Pyne
Parliament of 1625-1626	John Gill	Thomas Horner
Parliament of 1628-1629	Thomas Horner	Edward Wyndham
No Parliament summoned 1629-1640

=== MPs 1640–1832 ===
Year	First member	First party	Second member	Second party
April 1640	Francis Wyndham		Alexander Popham	
1640	Francis Wyndham		Dr Arthur Duck	
November 1640	Alexander Luttrell I	Parliamentarian	Sir Francis Popham	Parliamentarian
1642	Thomas Hanham	Royalist	Sir Francis Popham	Parliamentarian
January 1644	Hanham disabled from sitting — seat vacant		Sir Francis Popham	Parliamentarian
August 1644	Hanham disabled from sitting — seat vacant		Popham died — seat vacant	
1645	Walter Strickland		Edward Popham	
December 1648	Walter Strickland		Popham not recorded as sitting after Pride's Purge	
1653	Minehead was unrepresented in the Barebones Parliament and the First and Second Parliaments of the Protectorate			
January 1659	Richard Hutchinson		Colonel Alexander Popham	
May 1659	Walter Strickland		One seat vacant	
1660	Francis Luttrell I		Charles Pym	
1661	Francis Luttrell I		Sir Hugh Wyndham	
1666 by-election	Sir John Malet		Sir Hugh Wyndham	
1673 by-election	Sir John Malet		Thomas Wyndham	
February 1679	Sir John Malet		Francis Luttrell II	
September 1679	Thomas Palmer		Francis Luttrell II	
1685	Nathaniel Palmer		Francis Luttrell II	
September 1690 by-election	John Sanford		Francis Luttrell II	
October 1690 by-election	John Sanford		Alexander Luttrell II	
1698	Sir Jacob Banks		Alexander Luttrell II	
1708	Sir Jacob Banks		Sir John Trevelyan	
1715	Sir William Wyndham		Sir John Trevelyan	
April 1717 by-election	Samuel Edwin		Thomas Gage	
May 1717 (on petition)	Sir John Trevelyan		James Milner	
1721 by-election	Sir John Trevelyan		Sir Richard Lane	
January 1722 (on petition)	Sir John Trevelyan		Robert Mansel	
March 1722	Thomas Hales		Robert Mansel	
1723 by-election	Thomas Hales		Francis Whitworth	
1727	Alexander Luttrell III		Francis Whitworth	
1737 by-election	Sir William Codrington		Francis Whitworth	
1739 by-election	Thomas Carew		Francis Whitworth	
1742 by-election	Thomas Carew		John Periam	
1747	Percy Wyndham-O'Brien		Charles Whitworth	
1754	Daniel Boone		Charles Whitworth	
1761	Henry Shiffner		The Earl of Thomond	
1768	Henry Fownes Luttrell I		Sir Charles Whitworth	
October 1774	Henry Fownes Luttrell I		John Fownes Luttrell	Tory
December 1774 by-election	Thomas Pownall		John Fownes Luttrell	Tory
1780	Francis Fownes Luttrell		John Fownes Luttrell	Tory
1783 by-election	Henry Beaufoy		John Fownes Luttrell	Tory
June 1784 by-election	Captain the Hon. Charles Phipps		John Fownes Luttrell	Tory
1786 by-election	Robert Wood		John Fownes Luttrell	Tory
1790	Viscount Parker	Tory	John Fownes Luttrell	Tory
1795 by-election	Thomas Fownes Luttrell	Tory	John Fownes Luttrell	Tory
1796	John Langston	Tory	John Fownes Luttrell	Tory
1802	John Patteson	Tory	John Fownes Luttrell	Tory
1806	The Lord Rancliffe	Whig	Sir John Lethbridge, 1st Baronet	Tory
January 1807 by-election	The Lord Rancliffe	Whig	John Fownes Luttrell	Tory
May 1807	John Denison	Tory	John Fownes Luttrell	Tory
1812	John Fownes Luttrell	Tory	John Fownes Luttrell	Tory
1816 by-election	John Fownes Luttrell	Tory	Henry Fownes Luttrell II	Tory
1822 by-election	John Fownes Luttrell	Tory	John Douglas	Tory
1826	John Fownes Luttrell	Tory	James Blair	Tory
1830	John Fownes Luttrell	Tory	William Edward Tomline	Tory
1831	John Fownes Luttrell	Tory	Viscount Villiers	Tory
1832	Constituency abolished			
