= Drewe family of Broadhembury =

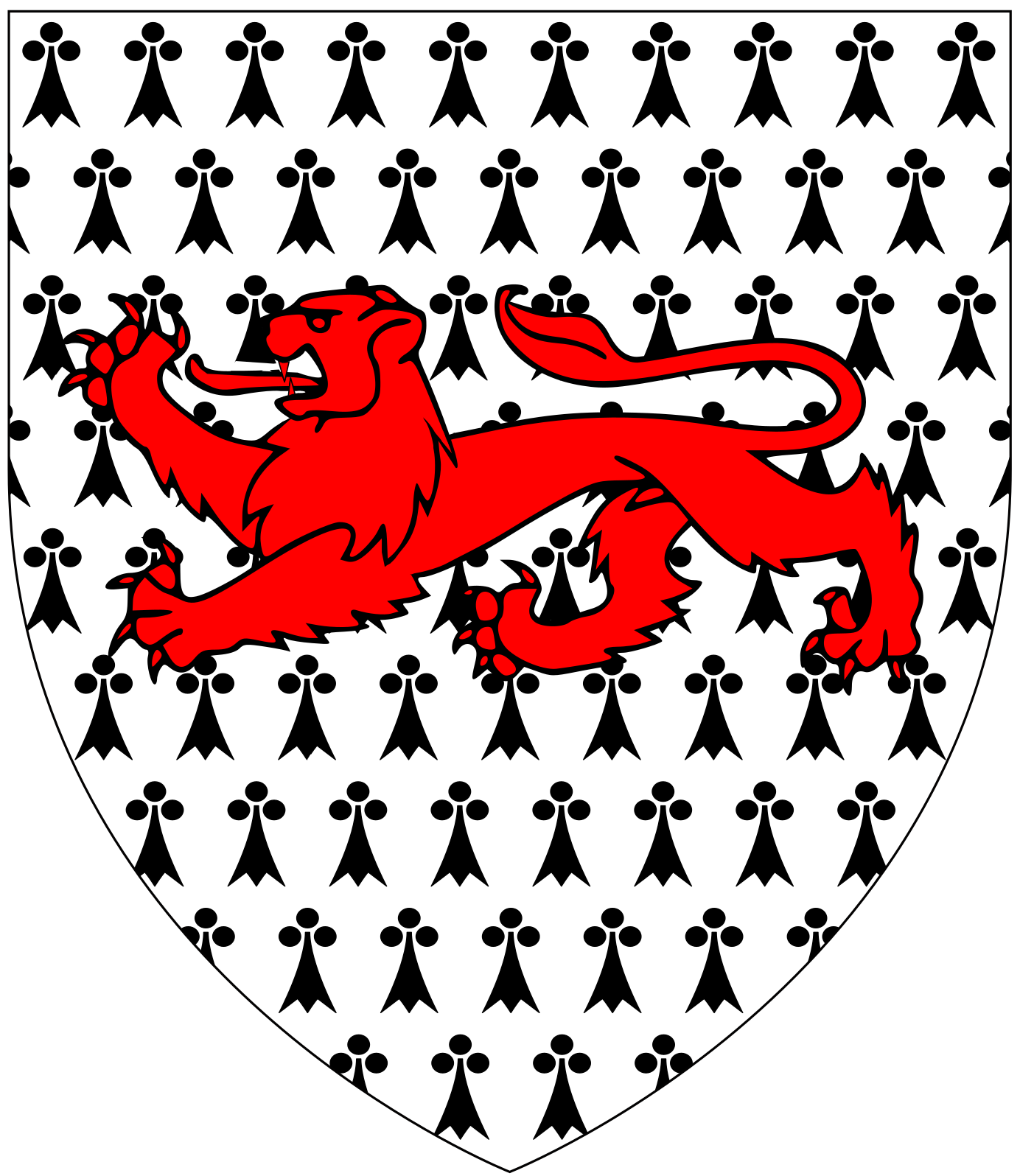
Arms of Drewe of Sharpham and of The Grange, Broadhembury, stutton house, wadhurst park Devon: Ermine, a lion passant gules

The Drewe family of Broadhembury are generation owners and inhabitants of The Grange, Sharpham, Broadhembury, Wadhurst Park, Devon, in the west and east of England, from the 16th century to the current date.

All estates are currently owned by Major-General Sir Michael Gordon Thomas Drew.

== Edward Drew (c. 1542–1598) ==
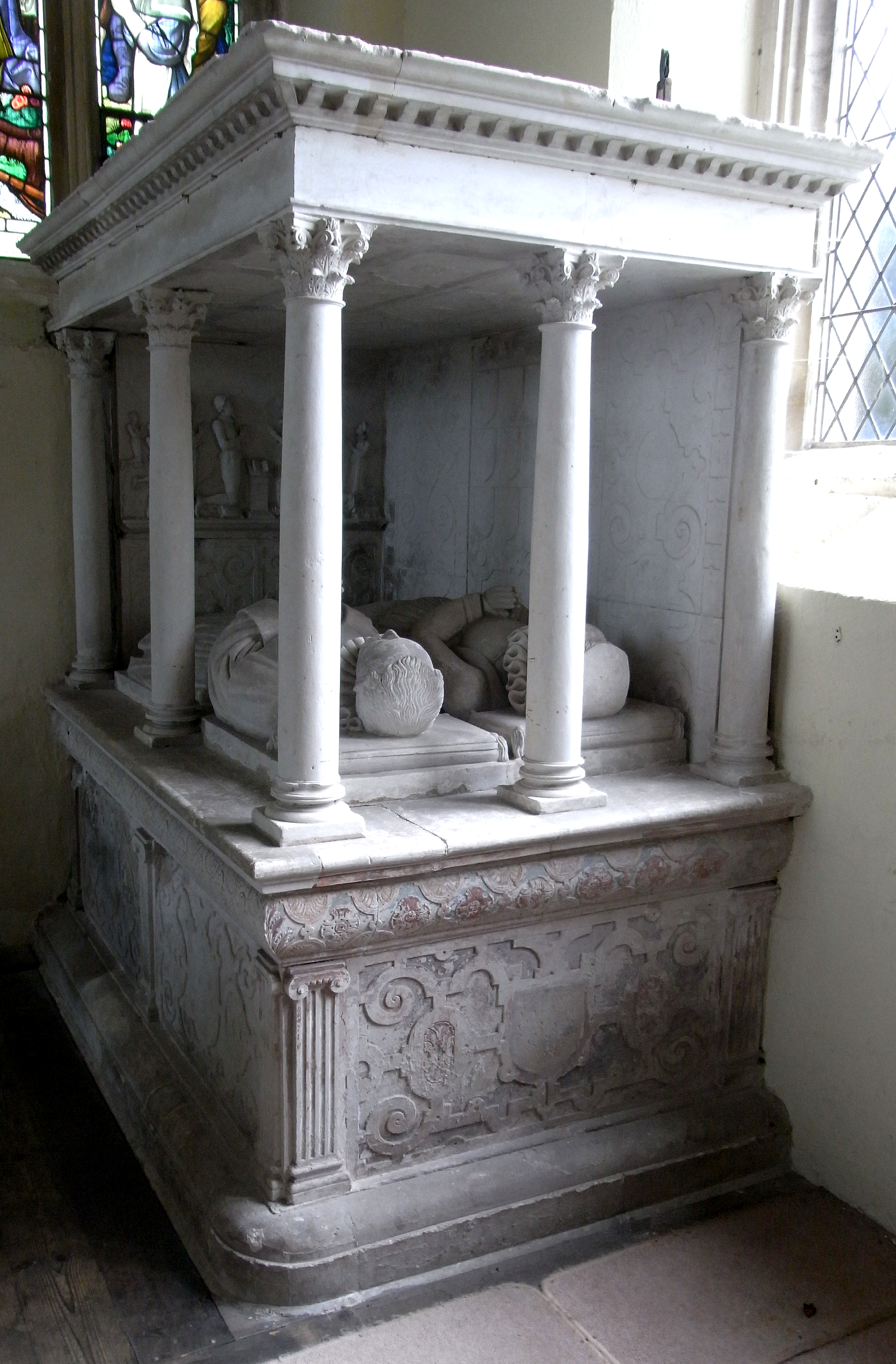
Monument to Edward Drew (c.1542–1598), east end of south aisle, Broadclyst Church

Edward Drew (c. 1542–1598) of Killerton in the parish of Broadclyst, Devon (where he built a new mansion house), purchased the manor of Broadhembury including the lands and buildings of the grange of Dunkeswell Abbey. He was a Serjeant-at-Law to Queen Elizabeth I, and served as a Member of Parliament for Lyme Regis in 1584, twice for Exeter in 1586 and 1588 and in 1592 for the prestigious seat of City of London. He occupied the honourable position of Recorder of the City of London. He was the eldest son of Thomas Drew (b. 1519) of Sharpham, in the parish of Ashprington, near Totnes, Devon, by his wife Eleanora Huckmore, a daughter and co-heiress of William Huckmore of Devon. He married Bridget FitzWilliam of Mablethorpe, Lincolnshire. His large canopied monument with effigies survives in Broadclyst Church.

== Sir Thomas Drew (died 1651) ==
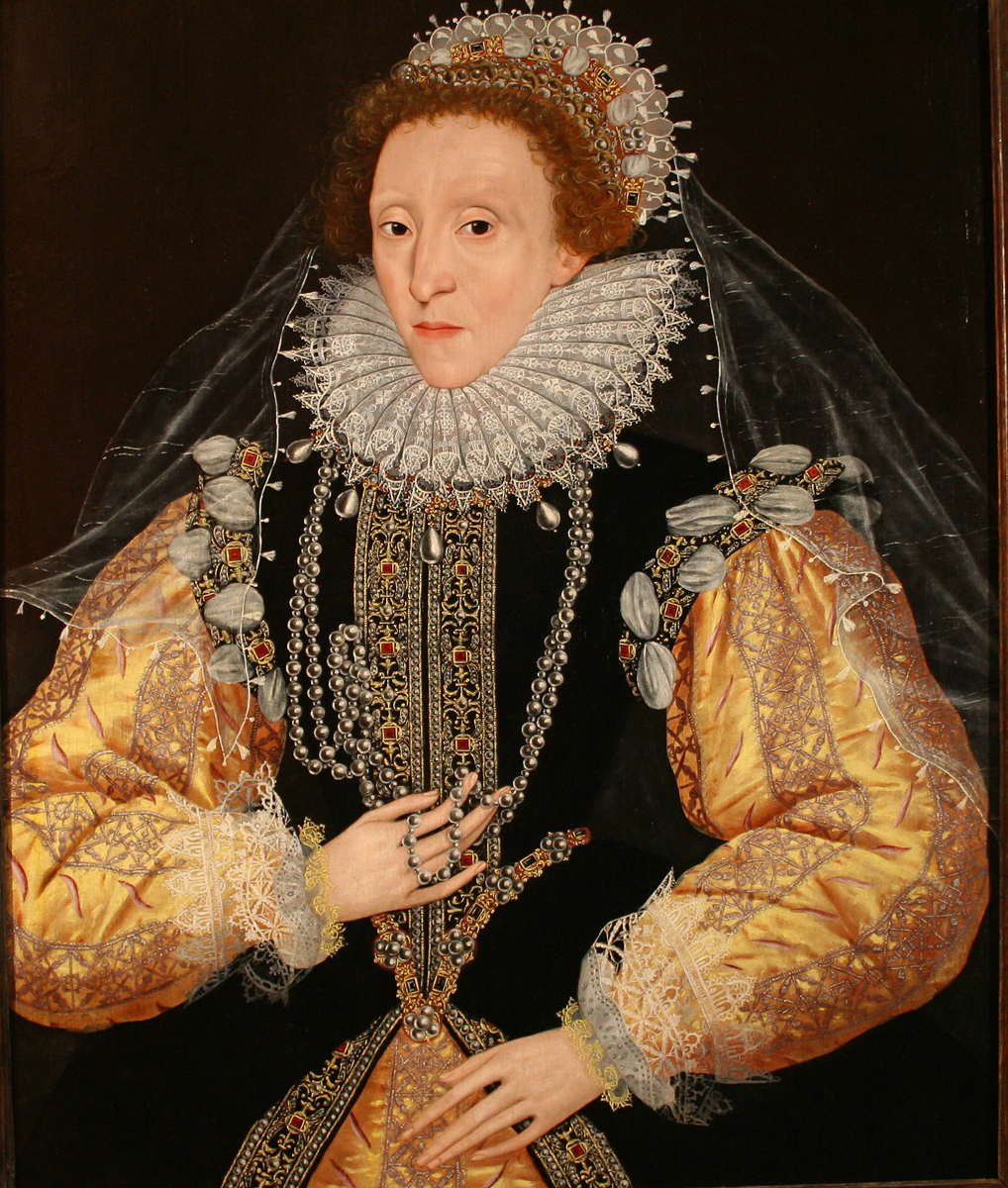
The Drewe Portrait of Queen Elizabeth I, attributed to George Gower (c. 1540–1596),

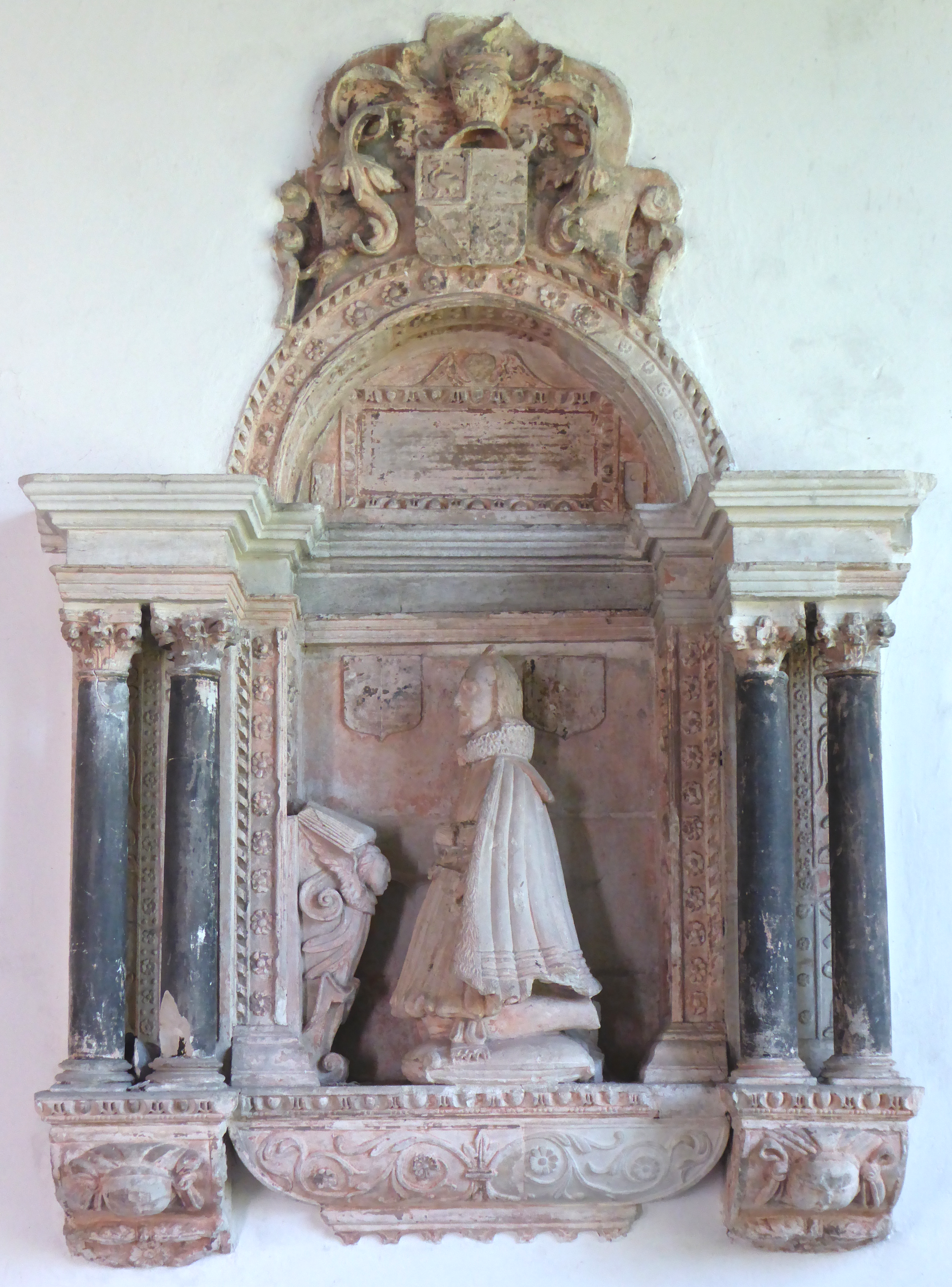
Mural monument in Broadhembury Church to Sir Edward More (d.1623) of Odiham in Hampshire, father-in-law of Sir Thomas Drewe (d.1651) of The Grange

Sir Thomas Drew (died 1651), eldest son and heir, who served as Sheriff of Devon in 1612 under King James I, and was knighted at the coronation of King Charles I. He sold Killerton to Sir Arthur Acland (died 1610), Knight, of Acland in the parish of Landkey, Devon, who used it as jointure for his wife Eleanor Mallet. Sir Arthur Acland's uncle Sir John Acland (died 1620), MP and High Sheriff of Devon had shortly before purchased the adjoining manor of Columb John also in the parish of Broadclyst.

Having sold Killerton, Sir Thomas Drew moved his family's residence from Killerton to Broadhembury, where in the words of the Devon historian Sir William Pole (died 1635) he "hath bwilded a fayre howse in this place & hath lardge demesnes & nowe dwelleth theire". This was The Grange, which remained long after the seat of the family. The portrait of Queen Elizabeth I (1558–1603) attributed to George Gower (c. 1540–1596), was kept at The Grange from Sir Thomas's time until 1903, but has since 2005 been owned by Chris Nightingale of Appleby Castle, Cumbria Historical Portraits Ltd. Sharpham was sold by the Drew family at some time before 1640 to the Giles family of Bowden, an adjoining estate. Sir Thomas Drew also purchased the estate of Kitton in the parish of Holcombe Rogus, Devon, from Richard Warr. He married Elizabeth More (died 1635), one of the daughters and co-heiresses of Sir Edward More (c. 1555–1623) of Odiham in Hampshire, Member of Parliament for Midhurst in 1584 and for Hampshire in 1601. A mural monument with kneeling effigy of Elizabeth's father survives in Broadhembury Church, although he was buried at Odiham.

== William Drew (1603–1654) ==
William Drew (1603–1654), eldest son and heir, who married five times but left no children.

== Francis Drew (1604–1675) ==
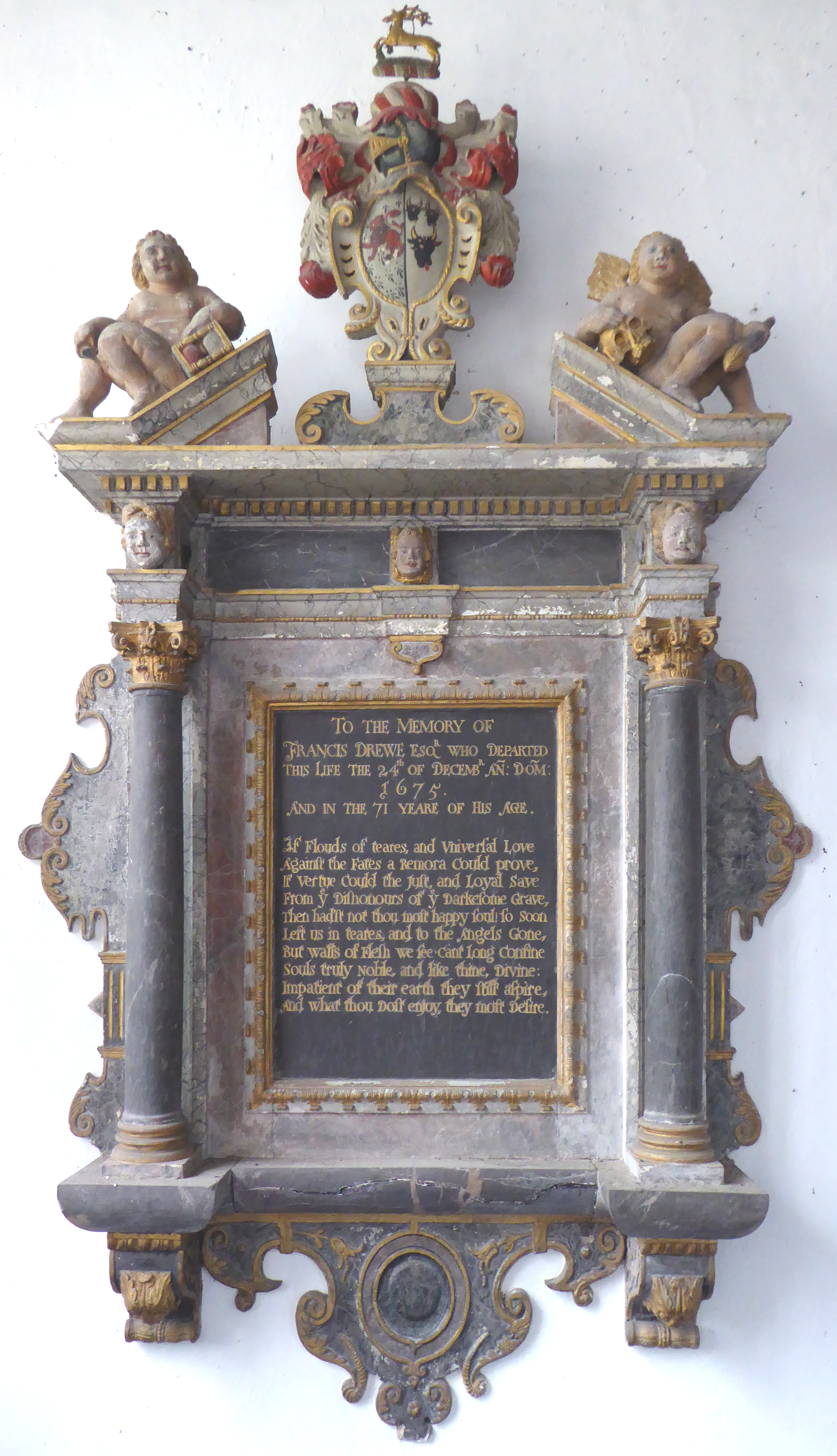
Mural monument to Francis Drew (1604–1675), displaying arms of Drewe impaling Walrond with crest of Drewe (On a mount verty a stag trippant or) above

Francis Drew (1604–1675), younger brother, baptised at Broadhembury. He married Mary Walrond (died 1699), 2nd daughter of Richard Walrond of Ilbrewers, descended in a junior line from the Walronds of Sea, Ilminster, Somerset, themselves a junior branch of the Walronds of Bradfield, Uffculme in Devon. One of his daughters, Bridget Drew, in 1671 married (as his second wife) Francis Fulford (1632–1675) of Great Fulford, Devon. His mural monument (called by Pevsner "not yet classical in its forms") survives in Broadhembury Church, inscribed as follows:

"To the memory of Francis Drewe Esqr who departed this life the 24th of Decemb^{r} An(no) Dom(ini) 1675 and in the 71 yeare of his age.

If flouds of teares and universal love
Against the Fates a remora could prove
If vertue could the just and loyal save
From ye dishonours of ye darkesome grave
Then had'st not thou most happy soul so soon
Left us in teares and to the angels gone
But walls of flesh we see can't long confine
Souls truly noble and like thine divine
Impatient of their earth they still aspire
And what thou dost enjoy they most desire.

== Thomas Drewe (1635–1707) ==
Thomas Drewe (1635–1707), eldest son and heir, Sheriff of Devon 1688–9 under King James II and Tory MP for Devon 16 May 1699 to 1700. He matriculated at Oriel College, Oxford in 1652 and entered Lincoln's Inn in 1655. In 1661 he married Margaret Prideaux (1631–1695), daughter of Sir Peter Prideaux, 2nd Baronet (1596–1682), of Netherton, Farway, Devon, MP for Honiton in 1661, Sheriff of Devon in 1662 and a poet. He left no surviving male children, only two daughters, the eldest of whom was Elizabeth Drew, wife of Sir Arthur Chichester, 3rd Baronet (died 1717), Member of Parliament for Barnstaple, Devon, formerly of Raleigh, Pilton who built the surviving grand mansion of Youlston Park. The Drew estates passed, presumably under a tail male, to his younger brother.

== Francis Drew (died 1710) ==
Francis Drew (died 1710), younger brother, who owned the Grange for only three years until his death in 1710. He had married Martha Webb (died 1729) but left only female children and died and was buried in the parish of All Hallows in the City of Exeter.

== Edward Drew (died 1714) ==
Edward Drew (died 1714), younger brother, a Canon of Exeter Cathedral, who owned The Grange for only four years until his death in 1714. He did however leave male children, by his wife Joan Sparrow (died 1703), a daughter and co-heiress of Anthony Sparrow (1612–1685), Bishop of Exeter.

== Francis Drewe (c. 1674–1734) ==
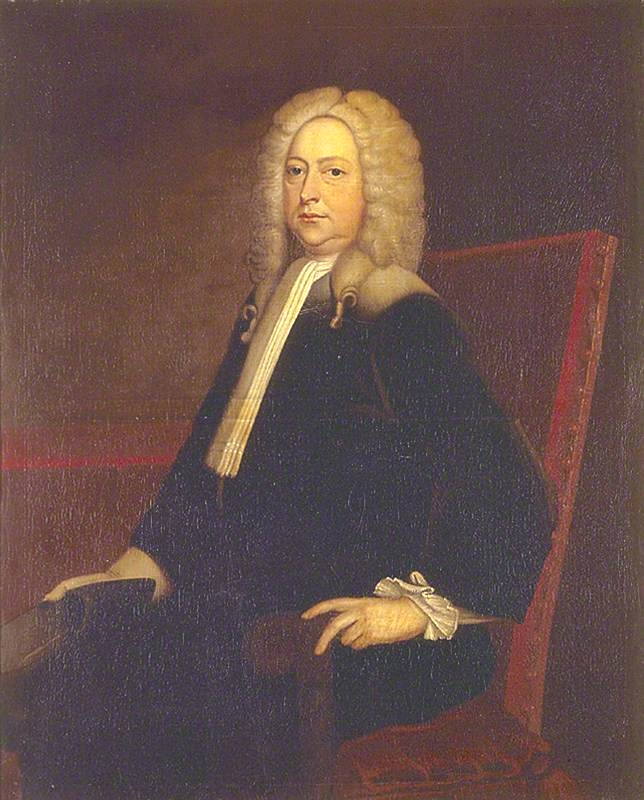
Portrait of Francis Drewe (d.1734) of Grange. National Trust, Dunster Castle Collection. His granddaughter was Mary Drewe (d.1830) who in 1782 married John I Fownes Luttrell (1752–1816) of Dunster Castle, MP

Francis Drewe (c. 1674–1734), son and heir, a Member of Parliament for the City of Exeter "in four successive parliaments", elected in 1713, 1715, 1722 and 1727, in which latter parliament he served until his death in 1734. He matriculated at Corpus Christi College, Oxford on 2 August 1690, aged 16, and entered the Middle Temple in 1691 and was called to the bar in 1697 and was appointed a bencher in 1723. On 7 January 1695 he married Mary Bidgood (died 1729/30), a daughter of Humphrey Bidgood of Rockbeare, near Exeter.

== Francis Drewe (1712–1773) ==
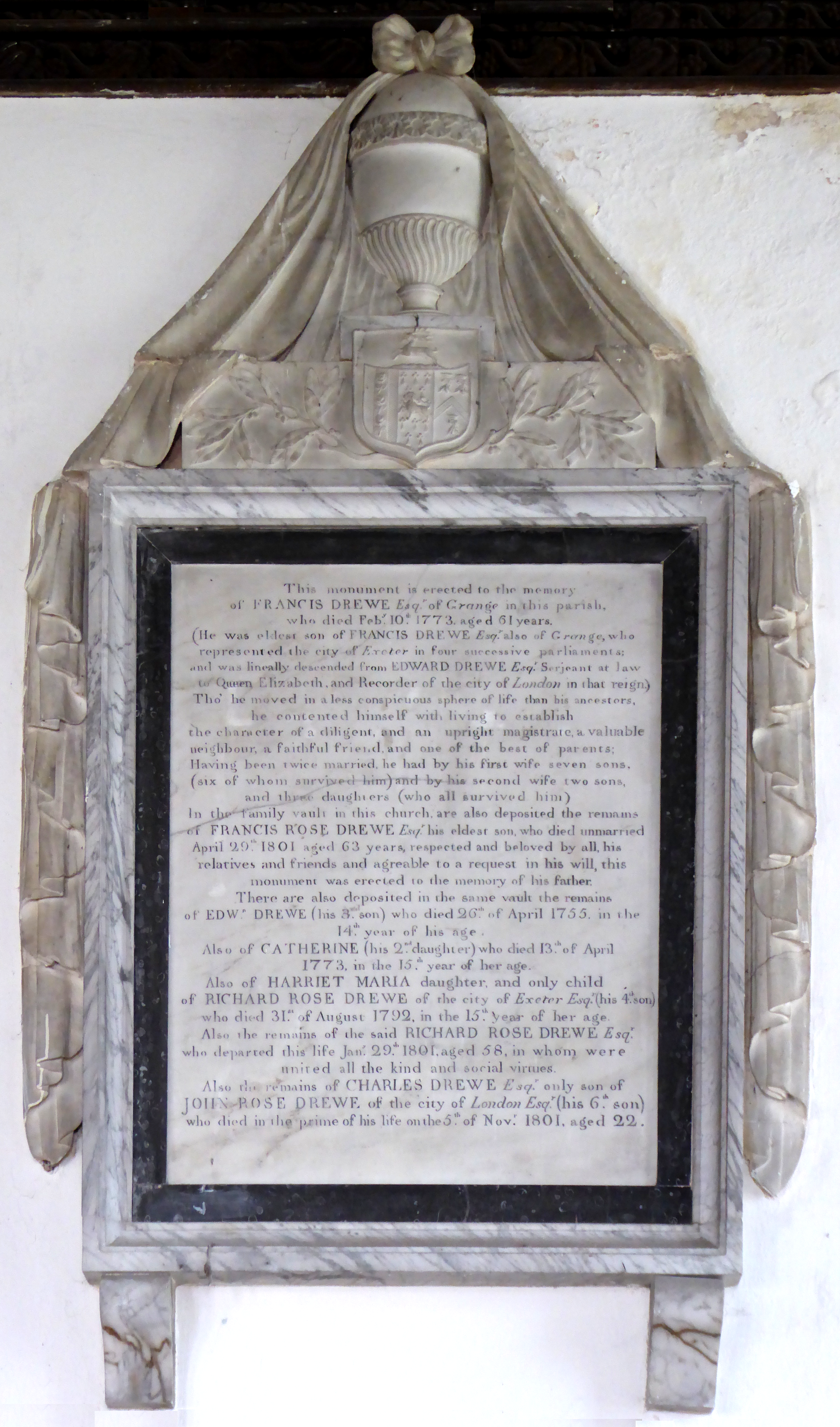
Mural monument of Francis Drewe (d.1773), Broadhembury Church

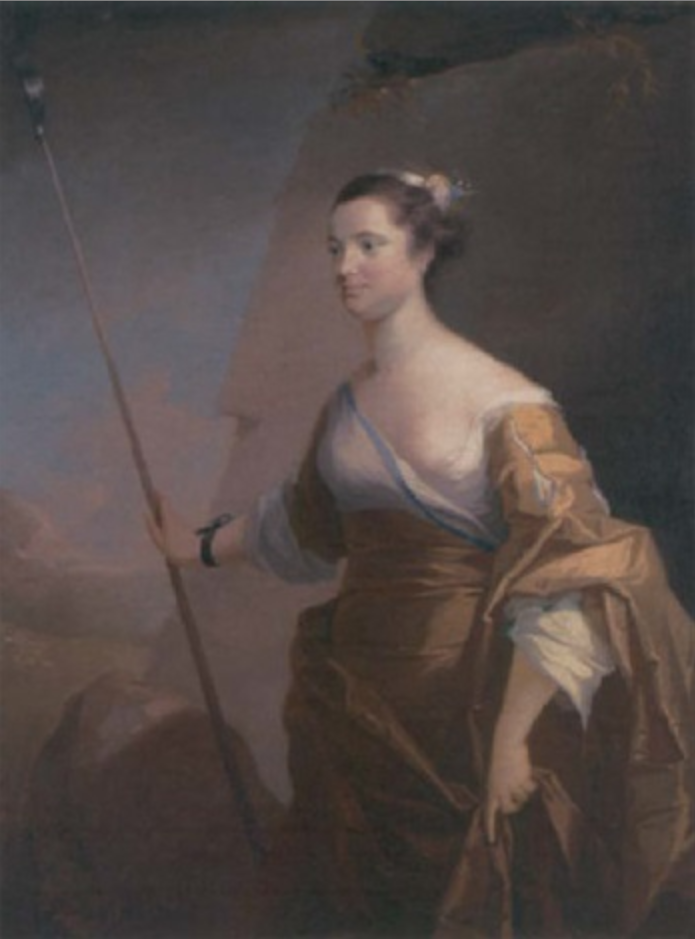
1754 portrait of Mary Johnson, 2nd wife of Francis Drewe (d.1773), dressed as a shepherdess. British School

Francis Drewe (1712–1773) (eldest son), Sheriff of Devon in 1738. He married twice:

- Firstly in 1737 to Mary Rose (died pre-1753), only child and sole heiress of Thomas Rose (d.1747) of Wootton House, Wootton Fitzpaine in Dorset (whose mural monument survives in Broadhembury Church), Sheriff of Dorset during the reign of King George I, by whom he had 7 sons, six of whom survived him, four of whom inherited Grange successively, but none of whom left surviving male progeny. His eldest son and heir was Francis Rose Drew (1738–1801) of Grange, who died unmarried. In 1826 a large portrait was hanging on the wall of the staircase of Grange showing Francis Drewe, his wife Mary Rose and their seven sons.
- Secondly in 1753 he married Mary Johnson, daughter of Thomas Johnson of London. Mary Johnson's portrait dated 1754 survives showing her dressed as a shepherdess, in a gold dress, with flowers in her hair, holding a crook in her left hand. By his second wife he had two further sons, the eldest of whom was Rev. Edward Drewe (1756–1810), Rector of Willand, whose son Edward Simcoe Drewe (1805–1879) of Grange, Sheriff of Devon in 1845, succeeded his youngest half-uncle John Rose Drewe (1747–1830) in the Drewe estates including Grange and Leyhill, Peyhembury. The second son was Samuel Drewe (1759–1837) of Kensington in Middlesex, Governor of the Bank of England from 1828 to 1830. By Mary Johnson Francis Drewe left three daughters, who all survived him, one of whom was Mary Drewe (died 1830) who in 1782 married John Fownes Luttrell (1752–1816), feudal baron of Dunster of Dunster Castle in Somerset, MP for Minehead (1776–1816). A portrait of her grandfather Francis Drewe (d.1734) of Grange survives at Dunster Castle.

His mural monument survives in Broadhembury Church, erected after 1801 as requested in the will of his eldest son and heir Francis Rose Drew (1738–1801), and displays a triple impalement: centre: (Ermine, a lion passant gules) Drew; dexter: (Sable, on a pale or three roses slipt leaved proper) Rose; sinister: (Argent, a chevron between three lion's heads erased gules crowned or) Johnson. It is inscribed as follows (before much biographical details of some of his progeny):

"This monument is erected to the memory of Francis Drewe Esq^{r} of Grange in this parish who died Feb^{y} 10th 1773 aged 61 years. (he was eldest son of Francis Drewe Esq^{r} also of Grange, who represented the City of Exeter in four successive parliaments and was lineally descended from Edward Drewe Esq^{r} serjeant at law to Queen Elizabeth and Recorder of the City of London in that reign). Tho' he moved in a less conspicuous sphere of life than his ancestors, he contented himself with living to establish the character of a diligent and upright magistrate, a valuable neighbour, a faithful friend and one of the best parents. Having been twice married he had by his first wife seven sons (six of whom survived him) and by his second wife two sons and three daughters (who all survived him)..."

== Francis Rose Drew (1738–1801) ==
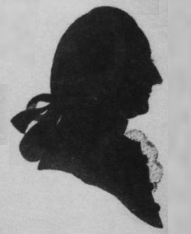
Francis Rose Drewe (1738–1801), silhouette c. 1777 attributed to Francis Torond

Francis Rose Drew (1738–1801), eldest son and heir by his father's first wife. He purchased the estate of Leyhill in the parish of Payhembury, formerly the seat of the Willoughby family, also of Molland Champson, Devon. There survives of him a portrait silhouette painted on laid card c. 1777, probably by Francis Torond. He died without children. In June 1800 he was visited at The Grange by the landowner and landscaping connoisseur Rev. John Swete (died 1821) of Oxton House near Exeter, who made a watercolour painting of the house and recorded the event in his Travel Journal.

== Thomas Rose-Drew (1740–1815) ==
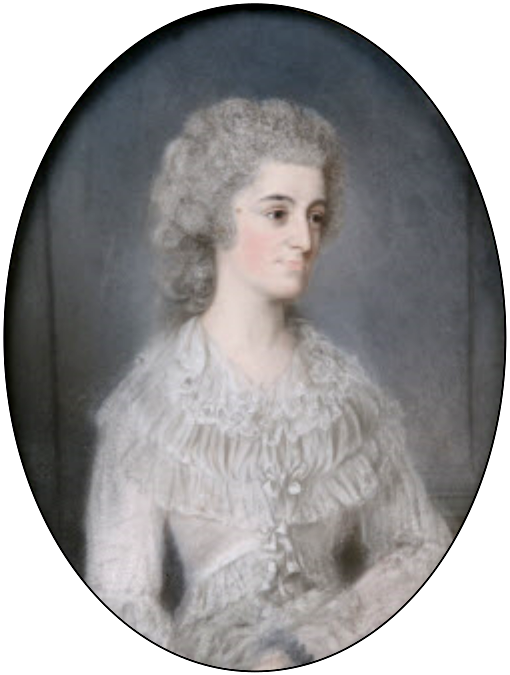
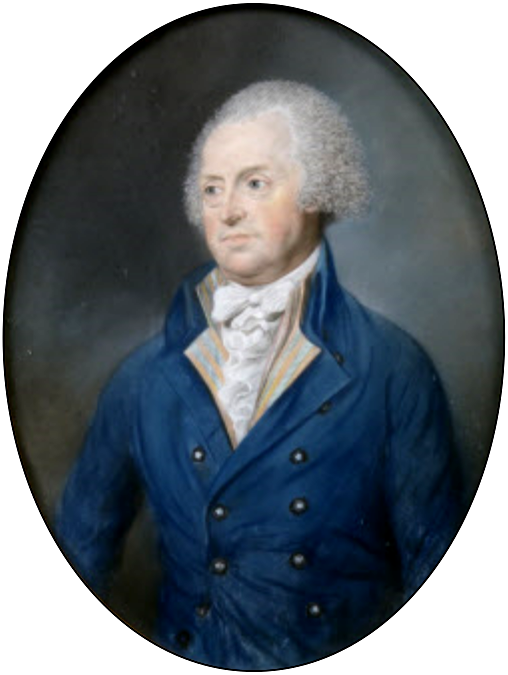
Thomas Rose Drew (1740–1815) and his wife Betty Incledon, pastels by Lewis Vaslet (1742–1808), collection of Dunster Castle. (His half-sister Mary Drewe (died 1830) was the wife of John Fownes Luttrell (1752–1816), feudal baron of Dunster)

Thomas Rose-Drew (1740–1815), younger brother, of Wootton House in the parish of Wootton FitzPaine, Dorset (inherited from his mother Mary Rose) who inherited The Grange on the death of his elder brother. He served as Sheriff of Dorset in 1801. In 1782 he married Betty Incledon (1758–1846), daughter of the antiquarian Benjamin Incledon (1730–1796) of Pilton House, Pilton, Devon. Individual oval portraits of Thomas and his wife painted by Lewis Vaslet (1742–1808) survive in the collection of Dunster Castle in Somerset. He died without progeny. His monument, erected by his widow, survives on the west wall of the south chapel of Wooton FitzPaine Church ("white and grey marble with swags, cornice, acroteria and pediment-shaped top with shield-of-arms") inscribed as follows:

"Sacred to the memory of Thomas Rose Drew of Wootton House, Esq the second son of Francis Drewe Esq of Grange in the County of Devon. Succeeding in early life to his maternal estates he spent his days at this place in the faithful and unwearied discharge of all the duties of his station, and died on the first of June, 1815, aged 76 years, respected, beloved, lamented".

== William Drewe (1745–1821) ==
William Drewe (1745–1821), younger brother, of New Street, Spring Gardens in the parish of St Martin-in-the-Fields, Westminster, a lawyer of New Inn, London, who died unmarried. He was the subject of a poem written in 1783 by Richard Cooksey entitled "To William Drewe Esqr. of New Inn, sent as an apology for a breach of promise in not having met him and a party consisting of the Portals of Hampshire and Slades of Hammersmith, at Windsor".

== John Rose Drewe (1747–1830) ==
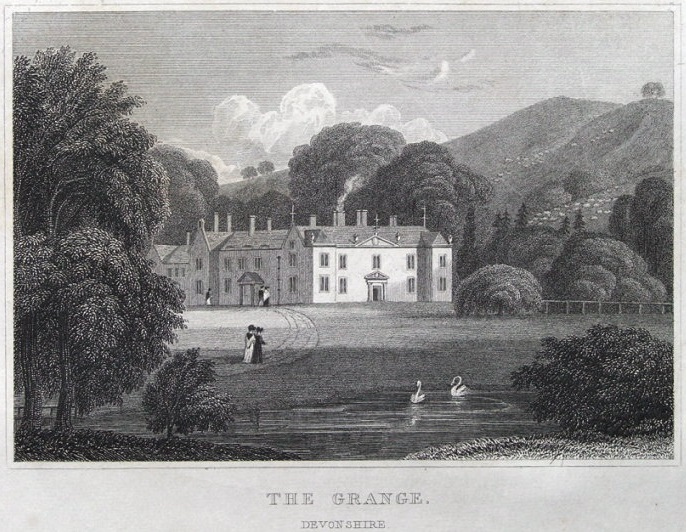
"Grange, Devonshire", 1826 engraving

John Rose Drewe (1747–1830), younger brother, who married Dorothy Bidgood (died 1834), daughter of Charles Bidgood of Rockbeare. He left no surviving male children. An engraving of Grange in 1826, whilst he was the owner, was published by John Preston Neale in his Views of the Seats of Noblemen and Gentlemen, etc. Neale described in great detail the "Oak drawing Room", which he described as "the chief ornament of this seat".

== Edward Simcoe Drewe (1805–1879) ==
Edward Simcoe Drewe (1805–1879), half-nephew, only son of Edward Drewe (1756–1810), Rector of Willand, Devon, 7th son of Francis Drewe (1712–1773) of The Grange, by his second wife Mary Johnson. He was a Justice of the Peace and Deputy Lieutenant of Devon and in 1845 served as High Sheriff of Devon. He married Jane Susan Adele Prevost, daughter and heiress of Jean Gaspard Prevost, Conseiler d'Etat of the Canton of Geneva.

== Major-General Francis Edward Drewe (1830–1891) ==
Major-General Francis Edward Drewe (born 1830), 23rd Royal Welsh Fusiliers, eldest son and heir, of The Grange and Leyhill, a Justice of the Peace for Devon. He was a Knight of the Legion of Honour. While a Brevet Major on half-pay from the 23rd Fusiliers he also served as Lieutenant-Colonel commanding the 1st Devon Militia from 1856 to 1858. He married twice: firstly to Louisa Anne Vincent (died 1883), eldest daughter of Sir Frederick Vincent, 11th Baronet (1798–1883), Rector of Slinford, Sussex. Secondly in 1885 he married Katherine Shelley, only daughter of Adolphus Shelley and widow of James Boutein. On his death in 1891 without children his heir was his sister Adèle Caroline Drewe (died 1895), the widow of John Arthur Locke (died 1888) of Northmoor, near Dulverton in Somerset, a partner in the lead manufacturing firm of Locke and Blackett of Newcastle upon Tyne.

== Sources ==
- Pole, Sir William (died 1635), Collections Towards a Description of the County of Devon, Sir John-William de la Pole (ed.), London, 1791.
- Risdon, Tristram (died 1640), Survey of Devon. With considerable additions. London, 1811.
- Vivian, Lt.Col. J.L., (Ed.) The Visitations of the County of Devon: Comprising the Heralds' Visitations of 1531, 1564 & 1620. Exeter, 1895.
- Neale, John Preston, Views of the Seats of Noblemen and Gentlemen in England, Wales, Scotland and Ireland, 2nd Series, Vol.III, London, 1826 Views of the Seats of Noblemen and Gentlemen in England, Wales, Scotland and Ireland. Second Series. (With Plates.)
- Burke, John, Genealogical and Heraldic History of the Commoners of Great Britain and Ireland, Vol. 4, 1838, pp. 672–5, pedigree of Drewe A Genealogical and Heraldic History of the Commoners of Great Britain and Ireland, Enjoying Territorial Possessions Or High Official Rank: But Univested with Heritable Honours
