= Henry Fownes Luttrell (died 1780) =

British politician and landowner

Henry Luttrell
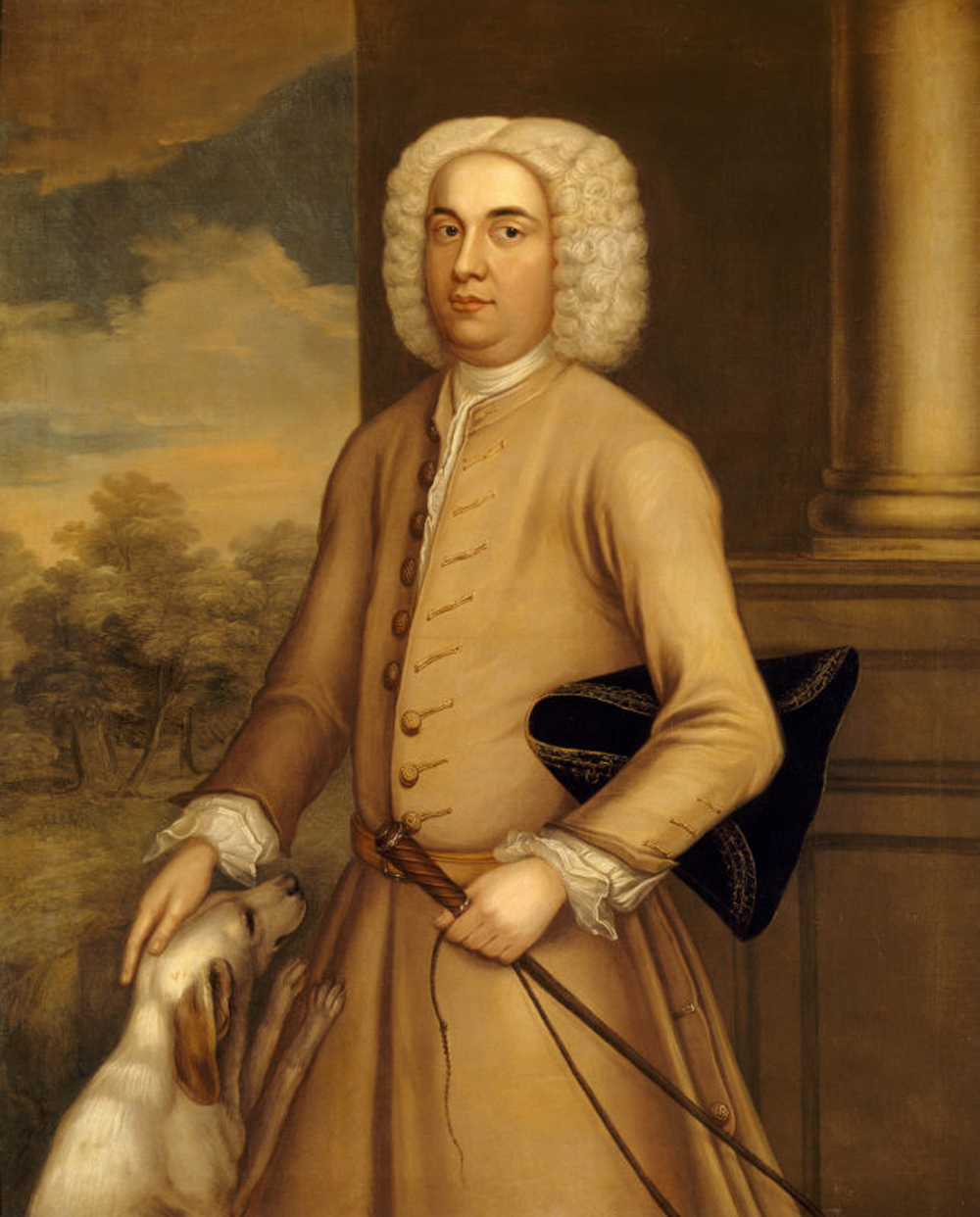
- Portrait of Henry Fownes Luttrell, National Trust, Dunster Castle

Member of the British House of Commons for Minehead
- In office 1768 – December 1774
- Preceded by: Henry Shiffner
- Succeeded by: Thomas Pownall

Personal details
- Born: Henry Fownes; 1722 or 1723
- Died: 30 October 1780 (aged c. 58)
- Spouse: Margaret Luttrell (m. 1747; died 1766)
- Children: John, Francis, Thomas, 2 other sons and 1 daughter
- Parent: John Fownes

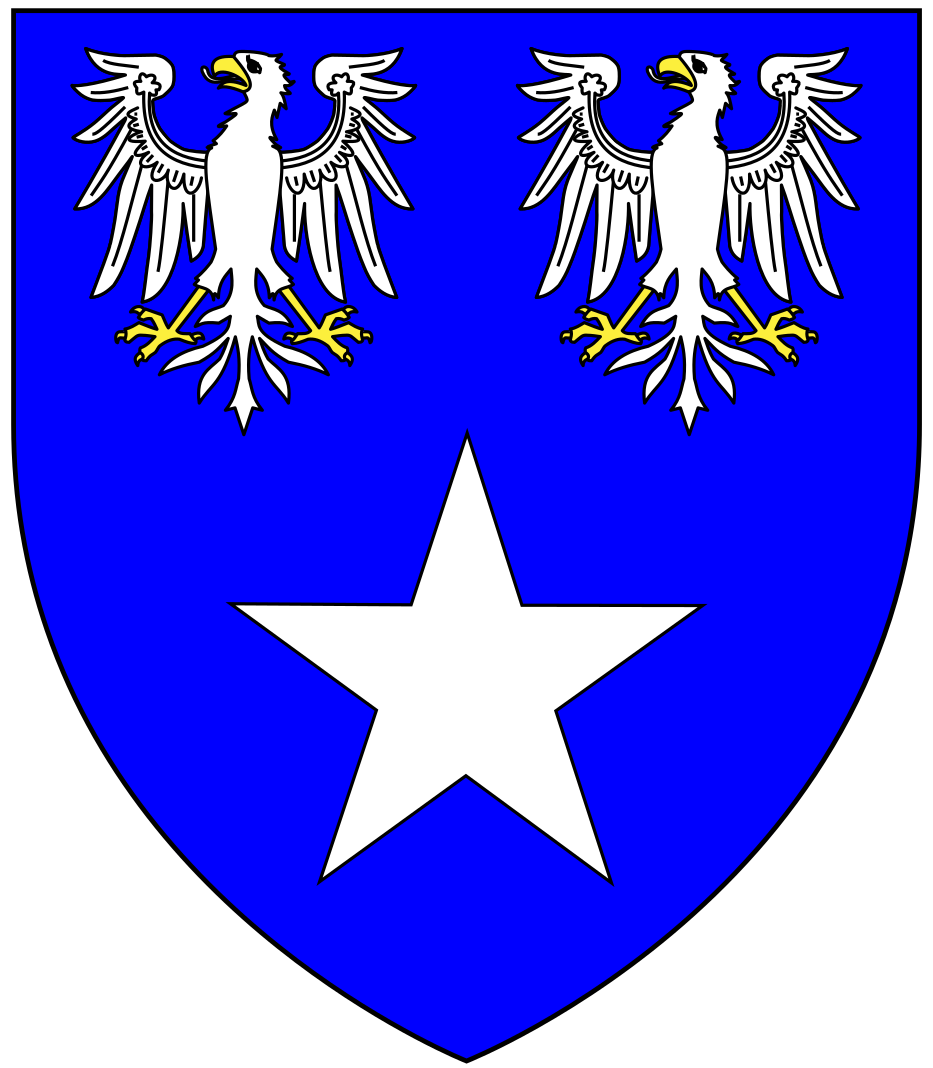
Arms of Fownes of Plymouth, Kittery Court & Nethway, in Devon & Dunster Castle in Somerset: Azure, two eagles displayed in chief and a mullet in base argent. Following his marriage and inheritance of Dunster Castle he adopted the arms of Luttrell and quartered his paternal arms

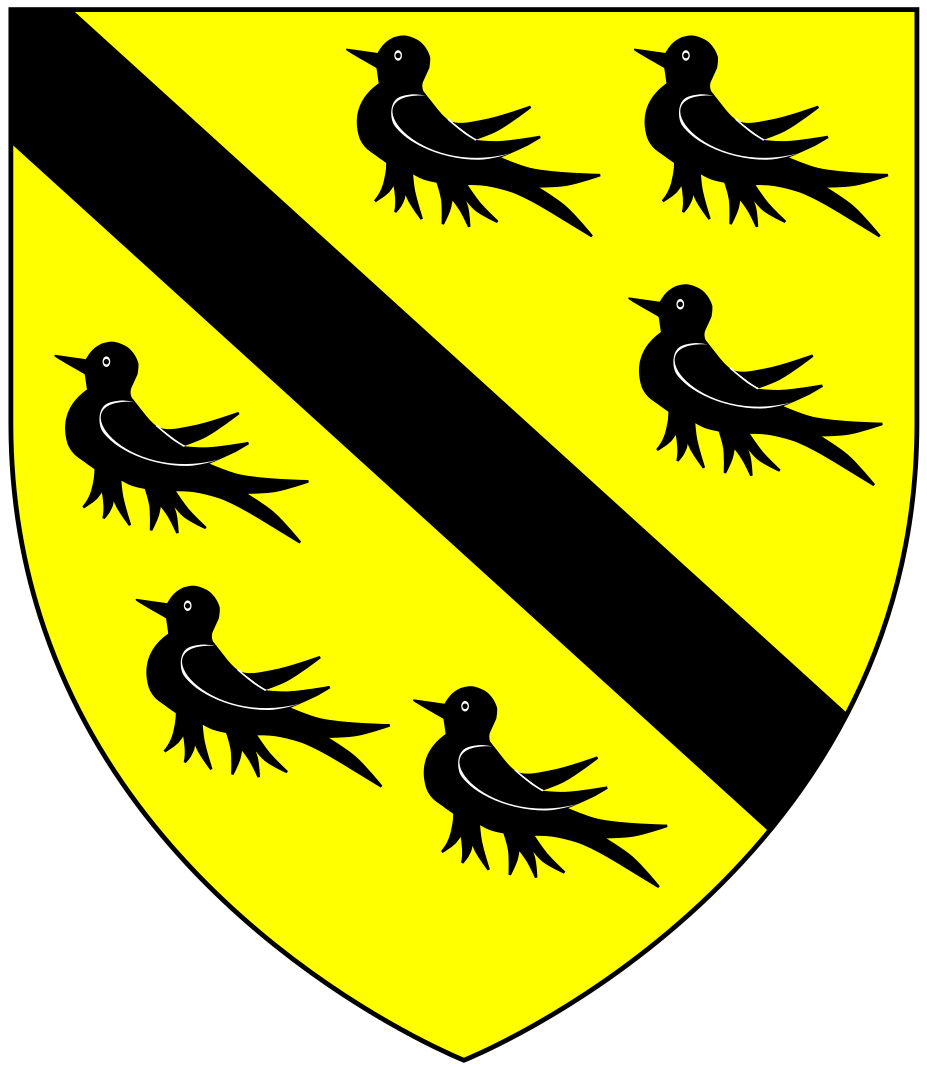
Arms of Luttrell: Or, a bend between six martlets sable, as adopted by Henry Fownes following his marriage

Henry Fownes Luttrell (born Henry Fownes; 1722 or 1723 – 30 October 1780), of Dunster Castle, Somerset, was High Sheriff of Somerset from 1754 to 1755 and a Member of Parliament for the borough of Minehead from 1768 to 1774.

Fownes was the son of John Fownes of Nethway and Kittery Court, near Dartmouth, and led the life of a country squire. In 1747, he married Margaret Luttrell, the heiress of Dunster Castle and added his wife's name to his own to comply with her late father's will. In accordance with the era's laws concerning the property rights of married women, on his marriage he became the legal owner of his wife's property, including not only Dunster Castle, but also the lordships of the manors of Dunster, Heathfield, and Kilton amongst others. The newly named Fownes Luttrell altered the castle considerably, remodelling its interior and park and building the Conygar Tower, a folly in the grounds. Following the death of his wife in 1766 he remarried in 1771.

When Fownes Luttrell's candidate for the 1754 election was defeated, he realised that his estate bought him relatively little political power. Frustrated, he set about nursing his interest in the borough. Later, a compromise with a rival landowner placed one of the borough's two parliamentary seats in his pocket. He stood for election in 1768 and was returned with the support of the Government. He was returned again in 1774 alongside his eldest son, John; the Prime Minister was disgruntled that he had not returned his own favoured candidate and Fownes Luttrell resigned on the condition that the Government's candidate would not interfere in the future without his permission. Thenceforth until abolition by the Reform Act 1832 the borough's parliamentary seats were effectively controlled by his family.

Fownes Luttrell was an inactive politician and is not known to have spoken or voted in Parliament during the six years he was a member. Instead, he led the life of a country squire, hunting and managing his estates. Fownes Luttrell died in 1780, and his eldest son succeeded to his estates.

== Origins ==
Henry Fownes was born in 1722 or 1723, the eldest son of John Fownes (died 1733) of Kittery Court, Kingswear, Devon, a Member of Parliament for Dartmouth, by his wife Anne Maddock, a daughter of Samuel Maddock of Tamerton Foliot. His grandfather was John Fownes (1661-1731) of Kittery Court in the parish of Kingswear and of Nethway in the parish of Brixham, both in Devon, a Member of Parliament for Dartmouth, Devon, in 1713–14. The first of his ancestors to settle in Devon was Thomas Fones (died 1638) of Plymouth in Devon, a merchant who served as Mayor of Plymouth in 1619, whose ancestors were from Bromsgrove in Worcestershire and in 1539 had acquired Dodford Priory shortly after the Dissolution of the Monasteries.

== Marriages and issue ==
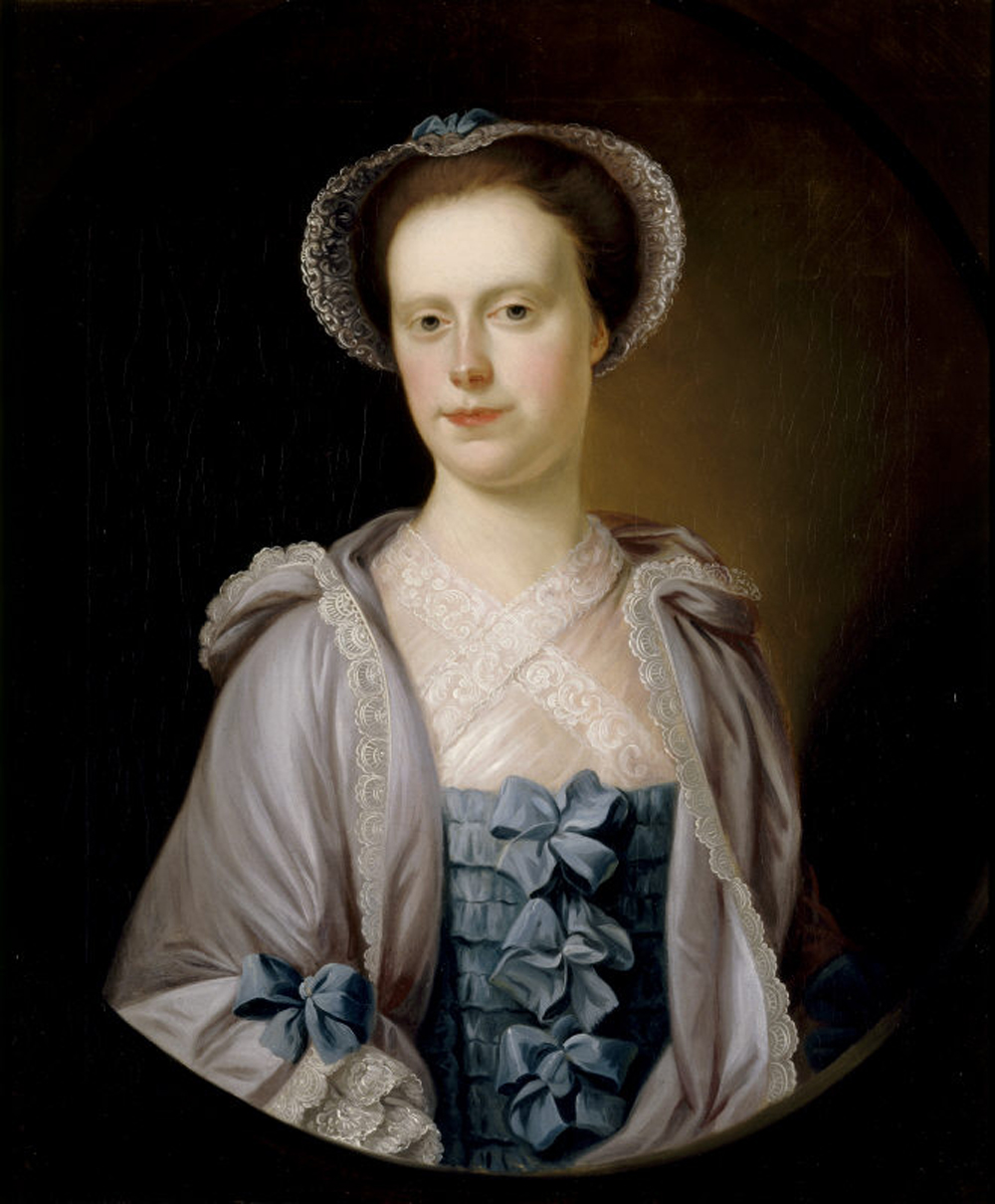
Margaret Luttrell (1726–66), Mrs Henry Fownes Luttrell, painted by Richard Phelps

He married twice:

- Firstly on 16 February 1747, to his second cousin Margaret Luttrell (7 February 1726 – 1766), the daughter and heiress of Alexander Luttrell (1705–1737), MP, whose family had owned Dunster Castle since 1376, by his wife Margaret Trevelyan, daughter of Sir John Trevelyan, 2nd Baronet of Nettlecombe, Somerset. According to Sir Henry Maxwell Lyte, the historian of Dunster Castle, "the union proved exceptionally happy and her letters to her husband ... are conceived in the spirit of the sincerest affection." Following his marriage and inheritance not only was he required under the bequest to add to his surname but was also compelled to spend six months of each year at Dunster Castle. By his wife he had six sons and four daughters. Of these, several died as infants: Alexander (born and died in 1749), Anne (born and died 1750), Anne (born and died 1751), and Anne (born and died 1758). The surviving issue were as follows:
  - Lieutenant-Colonel John Fownes Luttrell (1752–1816). He was a member of parliament for Minehead from 1774 to 1806 and again from 1807 to 1816.
  - Rev. Alexander Luttrell (baptised 1754; died 1816). He was educated at Pembroke College, Cambridge, and took holy orders; in 1807, he married Lucy Gatchell.
  - Francis Fownes Luttrell (1756–1823). He sat as a member of parliament for Minehead from 1780 to 1783 and went on to be Chair of the Board of Customs from 1813 to 1819.
  - Lieutenant-Colonel Thomas Fownes Luttrell (1763–1811). He was an army officer and sat as a member of parliament for Minehead from 1795 to 1796.
  - Lieutenant Henry Fownes Luttrell (1753–77), an officer in the Royal Horse Guards, died unmarried
  - Margaret Fownes Luttrell (1747–92) who in 1769 married John Henry Southcote of Buckland Toutsaints, Devon, and sat for a portrait by Sir Joshua Reynolds that year.
- Secondly in 1771, five years after the death of his first wife, he married Frances Bradley (d.1803), a daughter of Samuel Bradley of Dunster.

== Career ==
He matriculated at Queen's College, Oxford in 1741, but did not take a degree.

=== Country squire ===
Margaret Luttrell's father died in 1737, when she was eleven, and she inherited the position. (Note: At that time of his death, there were only five representatives of the family surviving: three distantly related men (one who was mentally ill, the other an aged bachelor and the last was a boy) and two women, Margaret and her young cousin Anne. (The mentally ill member was Southcote Luttrell of Saunton Court, the "old bachelor" was Francis Luttrell of the Temple, and the boy was Southcote Hungerford Luttrell.)) Her father left debts due to his lifestyle and also provisions in his parents' wills that forced him to support his niece, Anne Luttrell, a daughter of Francis, his brother. This situation caused the family seat at Dunster Castle to be closed and valued, while much of the family silver now in her possession was sold off, in some cases to relatives. Margaret Luttrell went to live with her mother's new husband, Edward Dyke of Tetton, a wealthy landowner. (Note: For a history of this family, see Hancock, F., The Parish of Selworthy in the County of Somerset, 1897 (in particular pp. 170–174).) While there, she married Fownes, who was then a resident of Nethway, Devon.

To improve his wife's estate, Fownes Luttrell obtained a sanction from the Court of Chancery to sell the manors of Heathfield and Kilton but found no buyers; he subsequently attempted to sell the manor of Minehead, and also offered at least one of the Parliamentary seats for the Borough of Minehead for £30,000, but there were no serious bidders, largely due to the high prices and the fact that Fownes Luttrell had in fact not inherited much control over the seats he was putting up for sale. However, frugal spending helped to recover the estate and Fownes Luttrell invested in 1760 in the manor of Foremarsh, near Dunster, which he purchased from John Poyntz. (Note: A description of this family's possession of Foremarsh is given in the first draft of the "Carhampton: Land Ownership" section of the Victoria County History of Devon, p. 19.) He went on to buy the manor of Staunton Fry in 1777 and a number of tenements in Dunster. In leisure, he particularly enjoyed hunting, keeping hounds and horses, and cockfighting.

=== Dunster Castle ===
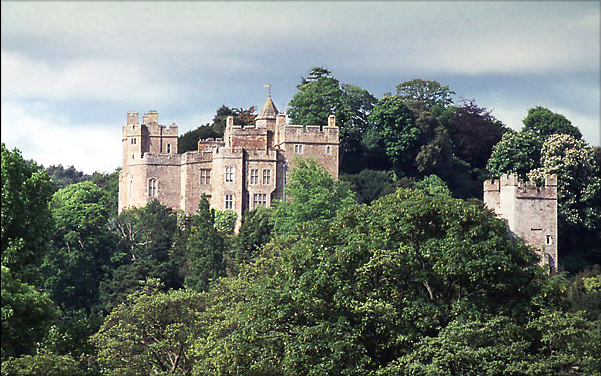
Dunster Castle, which Henry Fownes Luttrell remodelled. He also altered the grounds considerably.

Beginning in 1747, Fownes Luttrell made numerous and significant alterations to Dunster Castle, redecorating and redesigning it in the Rococo style. He renovated the Great Parlour, converted a bedroom over it into a Drawing Room in 1758, created a Breakfast Room over the Hall in 1772, remodelled the southern part of the castle, and altered the Great Staircase in 1773. His changes to the décor of the castle are also noteworthy, particularly for his use of newly-fashionable wallpaper.

Further alterations were made by Fownes Luttrell to the castle grounds. He created the park there and constructed Conygar Tower. The latter was commissioned in 1775 and was designed as a decorative folly to improve the views from the castle; he also built a gatehouse and a statue of Neptune in Conygar wood at a similar time, while commissioning the reconstruction of Dunster Water Mill and the adjacent bridge, which were rebuilt from 1779 to 1780. In 1764, the Lower Ward of the Castle was reduced to one level, while several adjoining walls were removed and the road passing through the gateway was covered over. Additionally, his 141-hectare (350-acre) park was built south of the castle, and required the eviction of a number of tenant farmers.

=== Member of Parliament ===
Being Lord of the Manor of Minehead theoretically gave Fownes Luttrell a "Natural Interest" in elections to Parliament for the borough—i.e. the power to influence the votes of its householders. However, the Luttrells had let it slip out of their control and Fownes Luttrell was being warned by his estate's agent, John St. Albyn, in 1747 that "you do not appear sure of more than one quarter of the vote, and it may happen too that of even one quarter of them some will fail you". At the British General Election of 1754, Fownes Luttrell was serving as High Sheriff of Somerset, which barred him from standing as a candidate to be a member of parliament; however Henry Shiffner, a merchant from London, approached him and offered himself as a candidate for the borough in his place. (Note: For his predecessor and successor as High Sheriff, see Dunning, R., A History of Somerset, 1983, pp. 109–117)

As St. Albyn had warned, Shiffner was not returned as a Member; instead, Lord Egremont, a local landowner, offered considerable financial support to his own candidate, Daniel Boone, while one of the incumbent MPs, Charles Whitworth, offered to sell parts of his estate to loyal supporters. An intervention from the Duke of Newcastle, at Egremont's request, led to Boone and Whitworth forming an alliance against Fownes Luttrell. Shiffner petitioned Parliament and was supported by an angered Fownes Luttrell, but Egremont and Fownes Luttrell eventually agreed a truce and by 1757 had agreed to return a member each and oppose any third candidates. Reluctant to stand himself, Fownes Luttrell supported Shiffner again. The pair would spend seven years dealing with the estate and consolidating his interest there; this, coupled with his arrangement with Egremont, meant that Shiffner was duly returned in 1761, alongside the first Earl of Thomond, brother of Egremont, beating an outsider, the Earl of Clanbrassill. During this Parliament, Fownes Luttrell entertained voters at Dunster Castle and in the village, where he laid on expensive feasts.

After his wife's death in 1766, Fownes Luttrell decided to stand at the general election in 1768. Despite his efforts to build up support, there were still factions and opposition to him. To gain some form of patronage in Minehead, he travelled to London and obtained from the Government control over the offices in Minehead, which prevented his opponents from doing the same. Fownes Luttrell won that election, accumulating more than £1,800 worth of expenses in the process. While a member of parliament, he is not recorded as speaking and does not appear in the small number of division lists still surviving. According to Maxwell Lyte, "it does not appear that [he] had any real zest for Parliamentary life [and was] probably far happier with his hounds and his fighting cocks in Devon or Somerset." However, it appears that the Prime Minister, Lord North, believed that in return for the Government's support in 1768, Fownes Luttrell had promised to return the Government's candidate, Thomas Pownall, at the next election; when that time came, in 1774, North supported Fownes Luttrell and "warned off" his rival, Charles Whitworth. However, Fownes Luttrell was elected alongside his eldest son, John, which caused a dispute between the former and North. The dispute was resolved when the elder Fownes Luttrell offered to resign that December, in favour of Pownall, on the condition that Pownall seek his approval before nominating any of his friends or himself in future; a draft document outlining his other conditions included a payment of £3,000 in return for his resignation.

Despite resigning, Fownes Luttrell had asserted his influence and control over both seats and, in 1780 his son Francis was elected alongside John Fownes Luttrell, who remained one of the MPs until 1806 and went on to sit again from 1807 to 1816; his other son, Thomas, and John's son (also called John) were also elected subsequently.

== Death ==
Henry Fownes Luttrell died on 30 October 1780.

== Ancestry ==
Ancestors of Henry Fownes Luttrell (died 1780)

4. John Fownes
2. John Fownes
5. Anne Yarde
1. Henry Fownes Luttrell
6. Samuel Maddock
3. Anne Maddock
7. Hon. Isabella Mohun

== Likenesses ==
- Portrait of Henry Fownes Luttrell by an unknown artist, at BBC Your Paintings.
- Portrait of Margaret, Mrs. Fownes Luttrell by Richard Phelps, at BBC Your Paintings.

Parliament of Great Britain
Preceded by Henry Shiffner; The Earl of Thomond	Member of Parliament for Minehead; 1768–Dec. 1774; With: Charles Whitworth 1768–1774; John Fownes Luttrell 1774	Succeeded by John Fownes Luttrell; Thomas Pownall
Other offices
Preceded by John Macie	High Sheriff of Somerset; 1754–1755	Succeeded by Roger Lyde
