= Sir George Pocock, 1st Baronet =

English politician

Sir George Pocock, 1st Baronet (15 October 1765 – 14 July 1840) was an English politician and peer who served as MP for Bridgwater from 1796 until 1806 and 1807 until 1820.

He was the eldest son of Rear admiral Sir George Pocock and Sophia Pitt. He was educated at Cormick's School, Putney and went to Eton College from 1778 till 1783. He was educated at Christ Church, Oxford from 1783 till 1786. He married Charlotte Mary on 6 June 1791 and had six sons and four daughters.

He was made a baronet on 18 August 1821.
