= John Fownes Luttrell (1787–1857) =

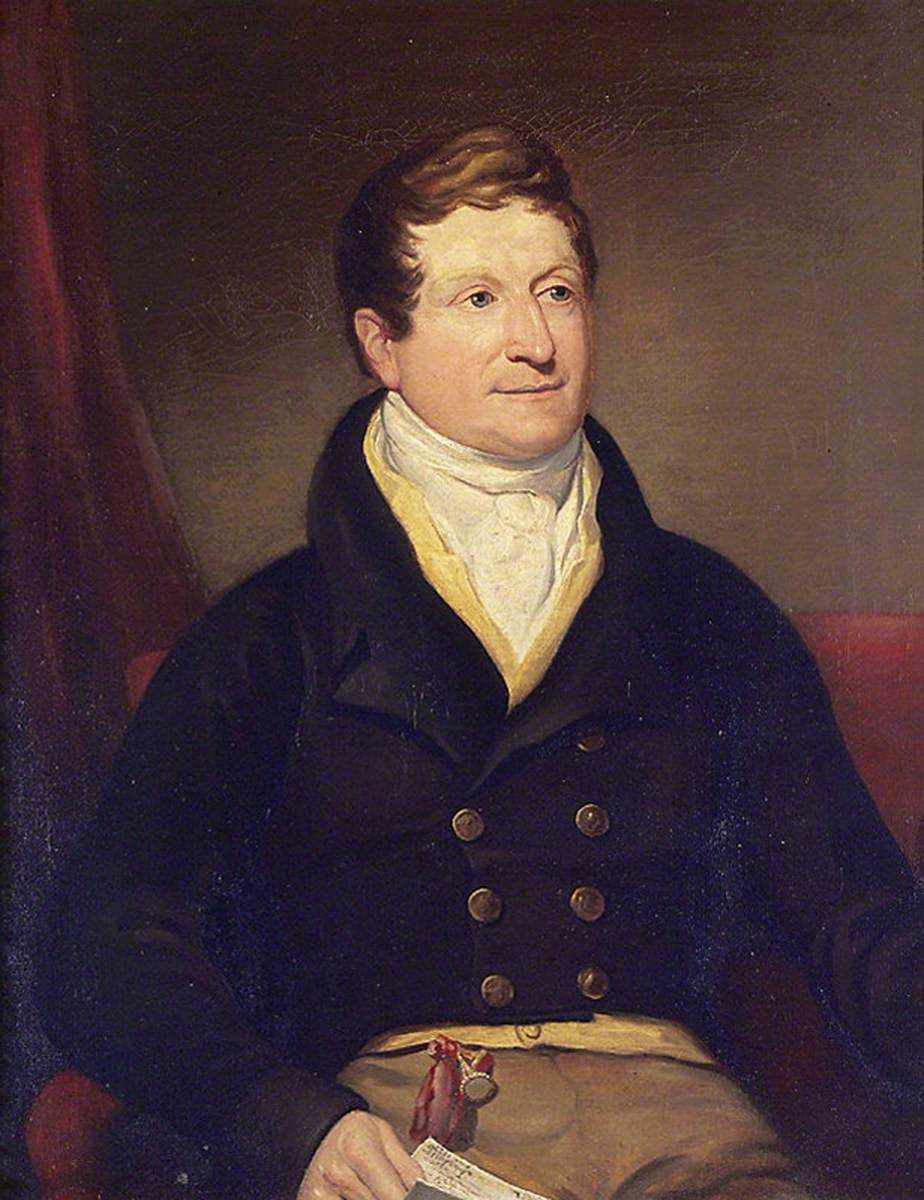
- John Fownes Luttrell in 1822

Member of Parliament for Minehead
- In office 1812–1832

Personal details
- Born: 26 August 1787
- Died: 11 January 1857 (aged 69)
- Parent: John Fownes Luttrell (father)
- Education: Eton College
- Alma mater: Oriel College, Oxford

John Fownes Luttrell (26 August 1787 – 11 January 1857) was an English politician who was a Member of Parliament (MP) and High Sheriff of Somerset.
