= Alexander Luttrell (1705–1737) =

English politician

Alexander Luttrell MP
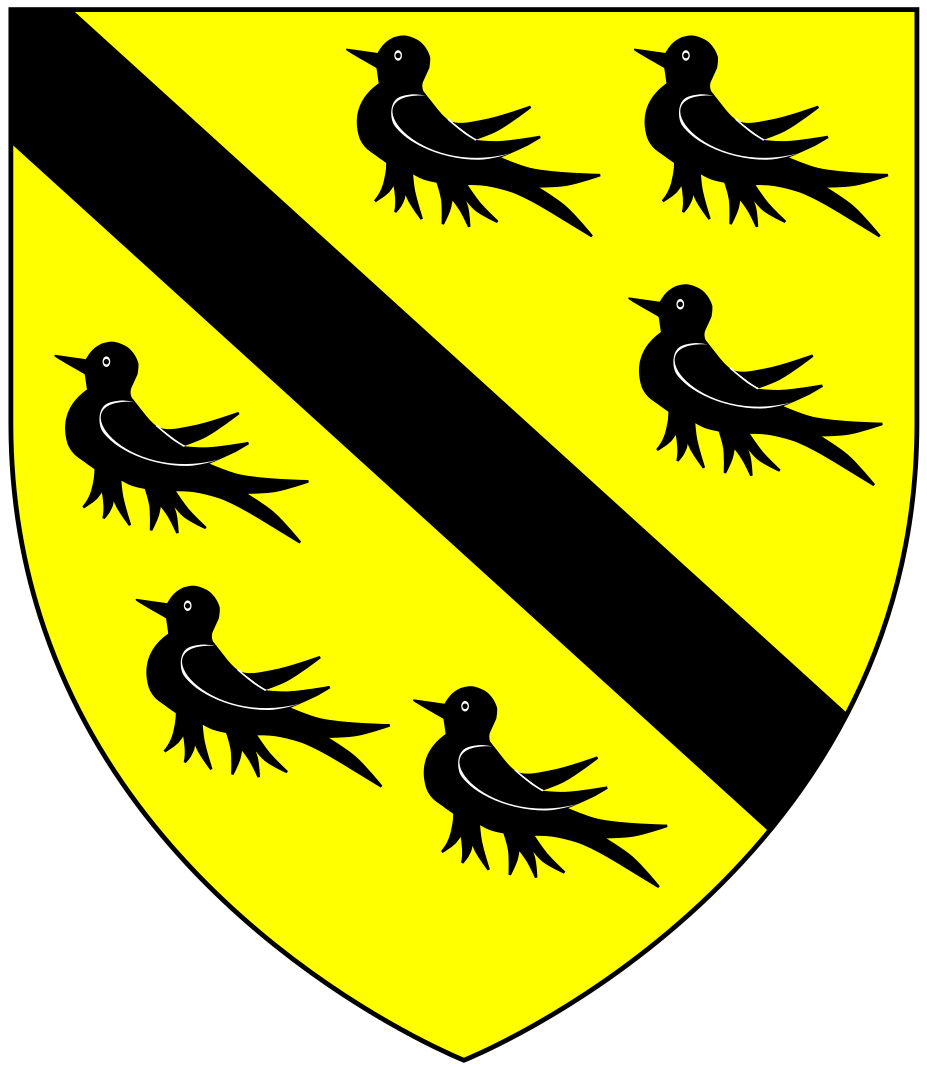
- Arms of Luttrell: Or, a bend between six martlets sable

Member of Parliament for Minehead
- In office 1727–1737

Personal details
- Born: 10 May 1705 Dunster, Somerset, England
- Died: 4 June 1737 (aged 32) Dunster, Somerset, England
- Resting place: Priory Churchyard of St. George, Dunster, West Somerset District, Somerset, England
- Spouse(s): Margaret Trevelyan, married 18 April 1724
- Children: One daughter
- Parent(s): Alexander Luttrell (1663–1711) and Dorothy Yarde
- Education: Christ Church, Oxford
- Occupation: Landowner

Alexander Luttrell (10 May 1705 – 4 June 1737) of Dunster Castle, Somerset, was an English politician and land-owner who served as Member of Parliament for his family's pocket borough of Minehead from 1727 until his death. He was the last in the male line of the Luttrell family, which had owned Dunster Castle since 1376.

== Early life and family ==
Alexander Luttrell was born on 10 May 1705, the eldest son of Colonel Alexander Luttrell, of Dunster Castle, by his wife Dorothy Yarde, daughter of Edward Yarde of Churston Ferrers, Devon. He matriculated at Christ Church, Oxford in 1722, where he was sent with his younger brother Francis.

On 18 April 1724 he married Margaret Trevelyan at St Anne, Soho, London, Westminster, England, daughter of Sir John Trevelyan, 2nd Baronet of Nettlecombe, Somerset, by whom he had a daughter and sole heiress Margaret Luttrell.

== Career and later life ==
The Luttrell family's ownership of the manor and castle of Dunster gave them a "natural interest" over the seat of Minehead, thus a Pocket Borough, and he was returned as a Tory Member of Parliament for that borough shortly after coming of age. In the House of Commons he generally voted against the Government. He held the seat until his death on 4 June 1737. He was buried on 16 June 1737.

Following his death his estate was in a poor financial condition and was put into Chancery. His widow remarried in 1741 to Edward Dyke of Tetton, and cared for her young daughter as well as Luttrell's niece, Anne Luttrell (daughter of Alexander Luttrell's brother Francis), and Dyke's niece and heiress Elizabeth Dyke. Mrs Dyke died in 1764. Margaret Luttrell was Luttrell's heiress and, when she married Henry Fownes, he inherited her estates and adopted the surname and arms of Luttrell as required by his father-in-law's will. Fownes served as Member of Parliament for the Luttrell family's pocket borough of Minehead.

== Portraits ==
Several portraits of Alexander Luttrell are listed by Maxwell Lyte (1909), but there is some difficulty in identifying him due to his similar appearance to his brother Francis. Maxwell Lyte lists a 1729 portrait of him by John Vanderbank at Dunster Castle, and others existed at one time at Nettlecombe Court and Bathealton Court. Portraits of his wife also existed at Dunster in 1909, and two portraits of her second husband Edward Dyke existed at Pixton at that time also. One portrait of Edward Dyke hangs at Dunster Castle in 2015.

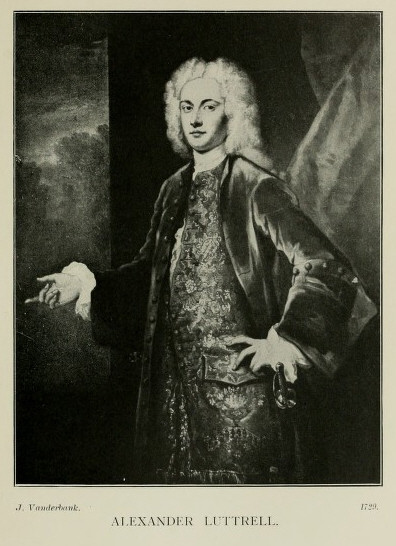
Alexander Luttrell (1705-1737)

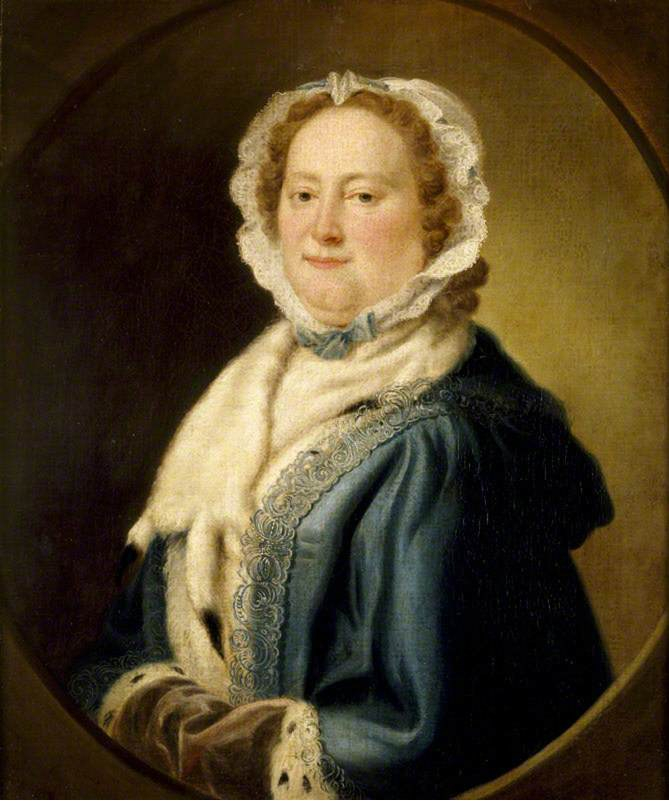
Margaret Luttrell (Trevelyan)(1704-1764)

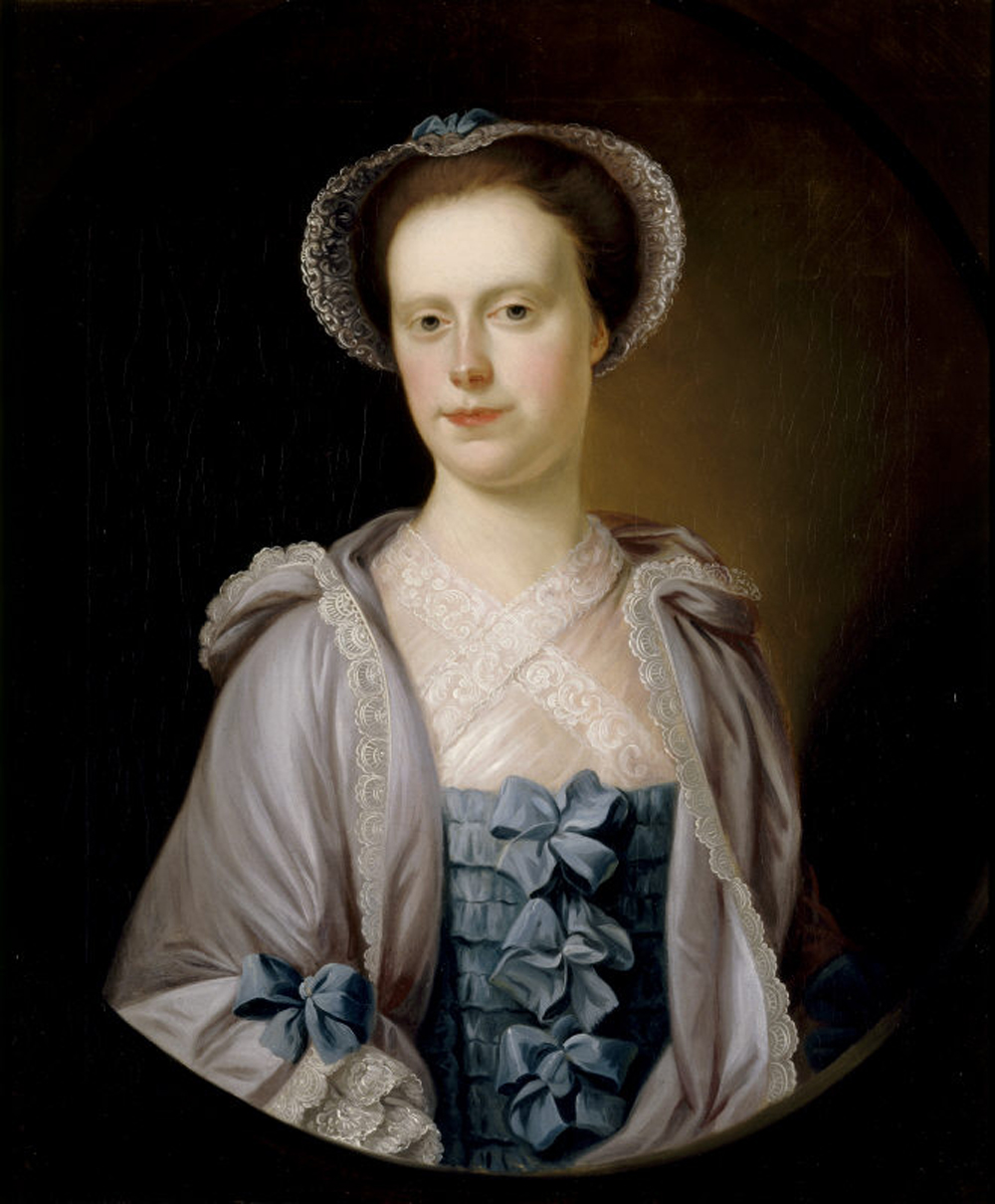
Margaret Fownes Luttrell (1726-1766)

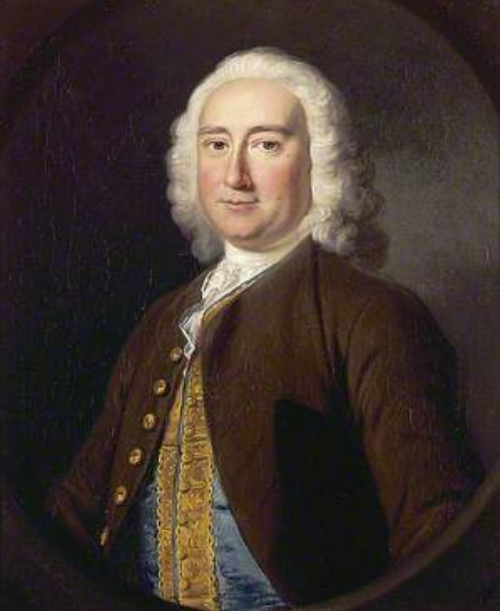
Edward Dyke (1688-1746)

== See also ==
- Feudal barony of Dunster

Parliament of Great Britain
Preceded by Thomas Hales; Francis Whitworth	Member of Parliament for Minehead; 1727–1737; With: Francis Whitworth	Succeeded by Francis Whitworth; William Codrington
