= 1796 British general election =

Election in Great Britain

- 25 May – 29 June 1796

All 558 seats in the House of Commons 280 seats needed for a majority
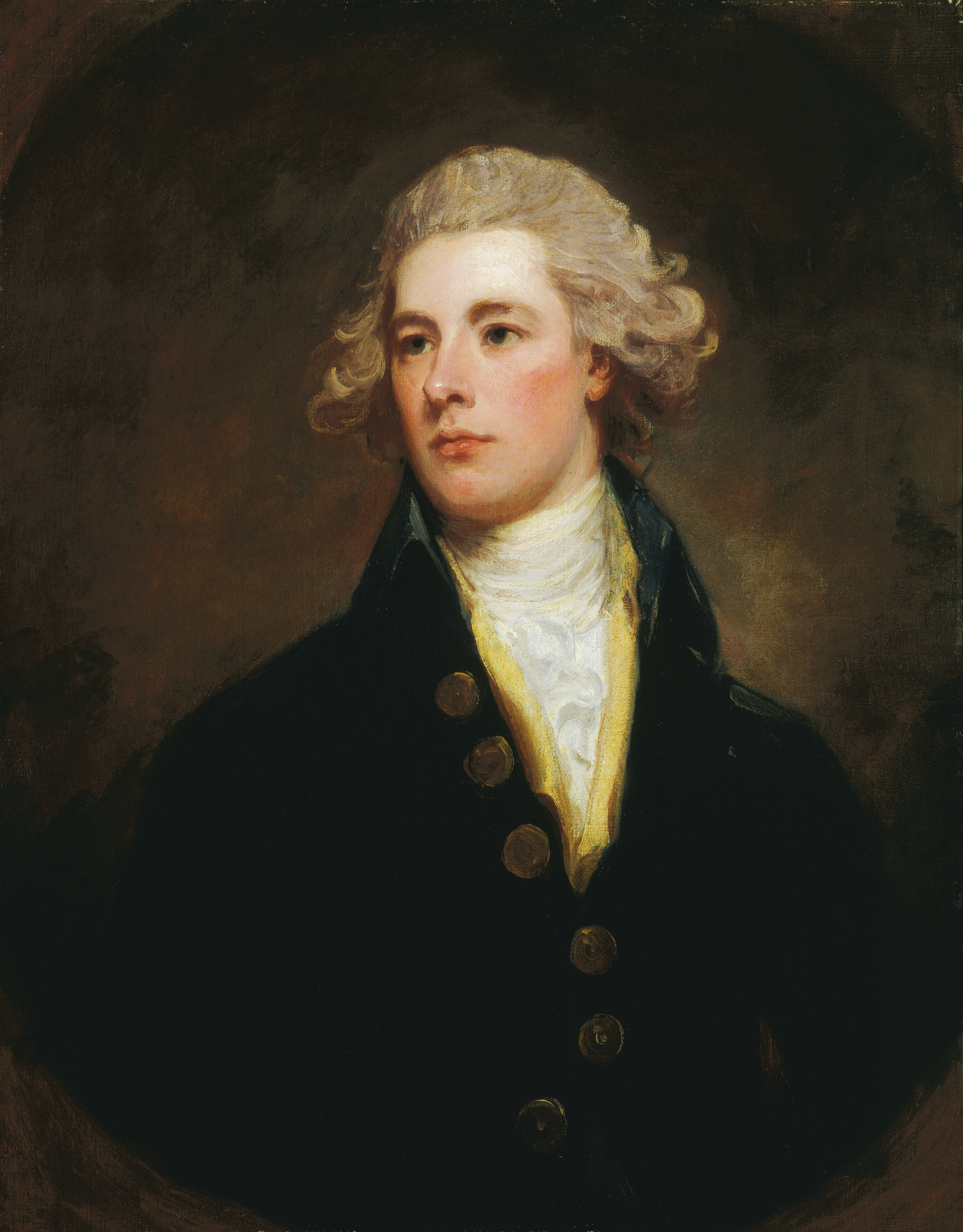

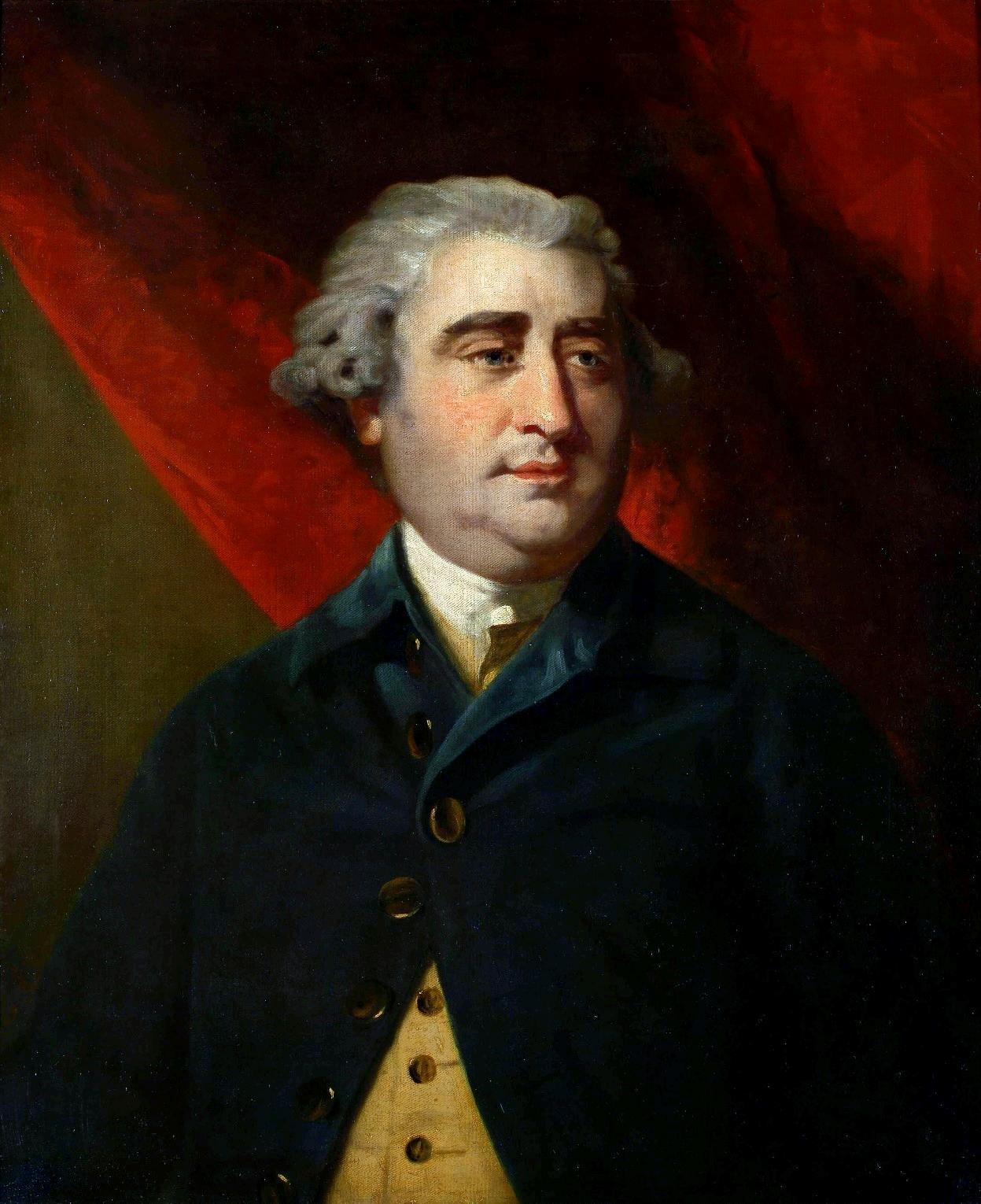
	First party	Second party
Leader	William Pitt	Charles James Fox
Party	Pittite	Foxite
Leader's seat	Cambridge University	Westminster
Seats won	424	95
Seat change	▲84	▼88
- Composition of the House of Commons after the election Tory/Pittite: 424 seats Whig/Foxite: 95 seats Other: 39 seats
Prime Minister before election
William Pitt
Pittite
Prime Minister after
election
William Pitt
Pittite

The 1796 British general election returned members to serve in the 18th and last House of Commons of the Parliament of Great Britain. They were summoned before the Union of Great Britain and Ireland on 1 January 1801. The members in office in Great Britain at the end of 1800 continued to serve in the first Parliament of the United Kingdom (1801–02).

== Political situation ==
Great Britain had been at war with France since 1793. The Prime Minister since 1783, William Pitt the Younger, led a broad wartime coalition of Whig and Tory politicians.

The principal opposition to Pitt was a relatively weak faction of Whigs, led by Charles James Fox. For four years after 1797 opposition attendance at Westminster was sporadic as Fox pursued a strategy of secession from Parliament. Only a small group, led by George Tierney, had attended frequently to oppose the ministers. As Foord observes "only once did the minority reach seventy-five, and it was often less than ten".

=== Dates of election ===
The period between the first and last returns was 25 May to 29 June 1796.

== Summary of the constituencies ==
Monmouthshire (One County constituency with two members and one single member Borough constituency) is included in Wales in these tables. Sources for this period may include the county in England.

Table 1: Constituencies and Members, by type and country

Country	BC	CC	UC	Total C	BMP	CMP	UMP	Total Members
England	202	39	2	243	404	78	4	486
Wales	13	13	0	26	13	14	0	27
Scotland	15	30	0	45	15	30	0	45
Total	230	82	2	314	432	122	4	558

Table 2: Number of seats per constituency, by type and country

Country	BC×1	BC×2	BC×4	CC×1	CC×2	UC×2	Total C
England	4	196	2	0	39	2	243
Wales	13	0	0	12	1	0	26
Scotland	15	0	0	30	0	0	45
Total	32	196	2	42	40	2	314

== Results ==

=== Seats summary ===
Parliamentary seats
Tory/Pittite	81.7%
Whig/Foxite	18.3%

== See also ==
- List of parliaments of Great Britain
- List of MPs elected in the 1796 British general election
