= Yarn Market, Dunster =

Grade I listed building in West Somerset, United Kingdom

Yarn Market
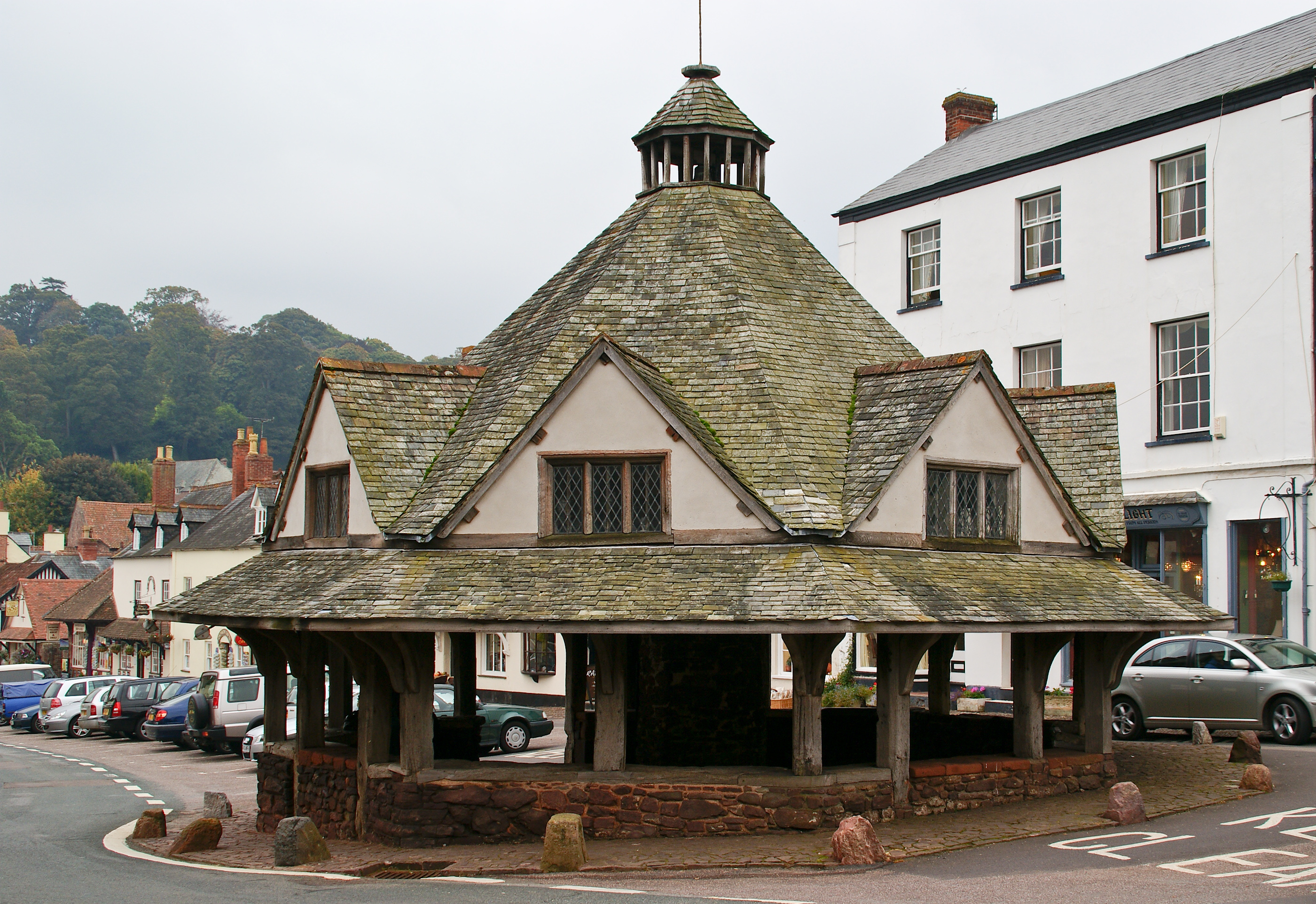
- The Yarn Market, Dunster

- Location within Somerset
- 51°11′04″N 3°26′39″W
- Location: Dunster, Somerset, England

History
- Built: c. 1600
- Rebuilt: 1647

Site notes
- Governing body: National Trust

Listed Building – Grade I
- Official name: Yarn Market
- Designated: 22 May 1969
- Reference no.: 1173428

Scheduled monument
- Official name: The Yarn Market
- Designated: 30 November 1925
- Reference no.: 1015706

The Yarn Market in Dunster, Somerset, England was built in the early 17th century. It has been designated as a Grade I listed building and scheduled monument. Dunster was an important market place in the Middle Ages particularly following the construction of Dunster Castle and the establishment of the Priory Church of St George.

The market cross was probably built in 1609 by the Luttrell family who were the local lords of the manor to maintain the importance of the village as a market, particularly for wool and cloth. It still bears the damage caused by cannon fire in the Civil War. Nearby was an older cross known as the Butter Cross which has subsequently been moved to the outskirts of the village. The Yarn Market is an octagonal building constructed around a central pier. The tiled roof provides shelter from the rain.

== History ==
Dunster Castle stands on a site which has been fortified since the late Anglo-Saxon period, signifying the importance of the area. After the Norman Conquest of England in the 11th century, William de Mohun constructed a timber castle on the site as part of the pacification of Somerset.

A stone shell keep was built on the motte by the start of the 12th century, and the castle survived a siege during the early years of the Anarchy. At the end of the 14th century the de Mohuns sold the castle to the Luttrell family.

Dunster had become a centre for woollen and clothing production by the 13th century, with the market dating back to at least 1222, and a particular kind of kersey or broadcloth became known as 'Dunsters'. The prosperity of Dunster was based on the wool trade, with profits helping to pay for the construction of the tower of the Priory Church of St George and provide other amenities. By the 15th century the importance of the town was declining particularly due to the silting up of the harbour. The Luttrells wanted to maintain the town's importance as a market, and in 1609 George Luttrell, of the Luttrell family constructed the market to shelter traders and their wares from the rain and provide more security for their wares. The exact date of construction is debated and a variety of dates are given in different sources, however 1609 is considered the most likely.

A second market cross, known as the Butter Cross, which was built in the 15th century used to stand near the Yarn Market but was moved to the outskirts of the village in the 18th or 19th century. The Yarn Market is in the guardianship of English Heritage but is managed by the National Trust. In 1951 the Ministry of Works took over various properties including the Yarn Market from the Crown Estate. They carried out restoration works, however this was controversial as the shape of the roof was changed to more closely resemble the appearance of the original building, rather than that produced by subsequent revisions.

== Architecture ==
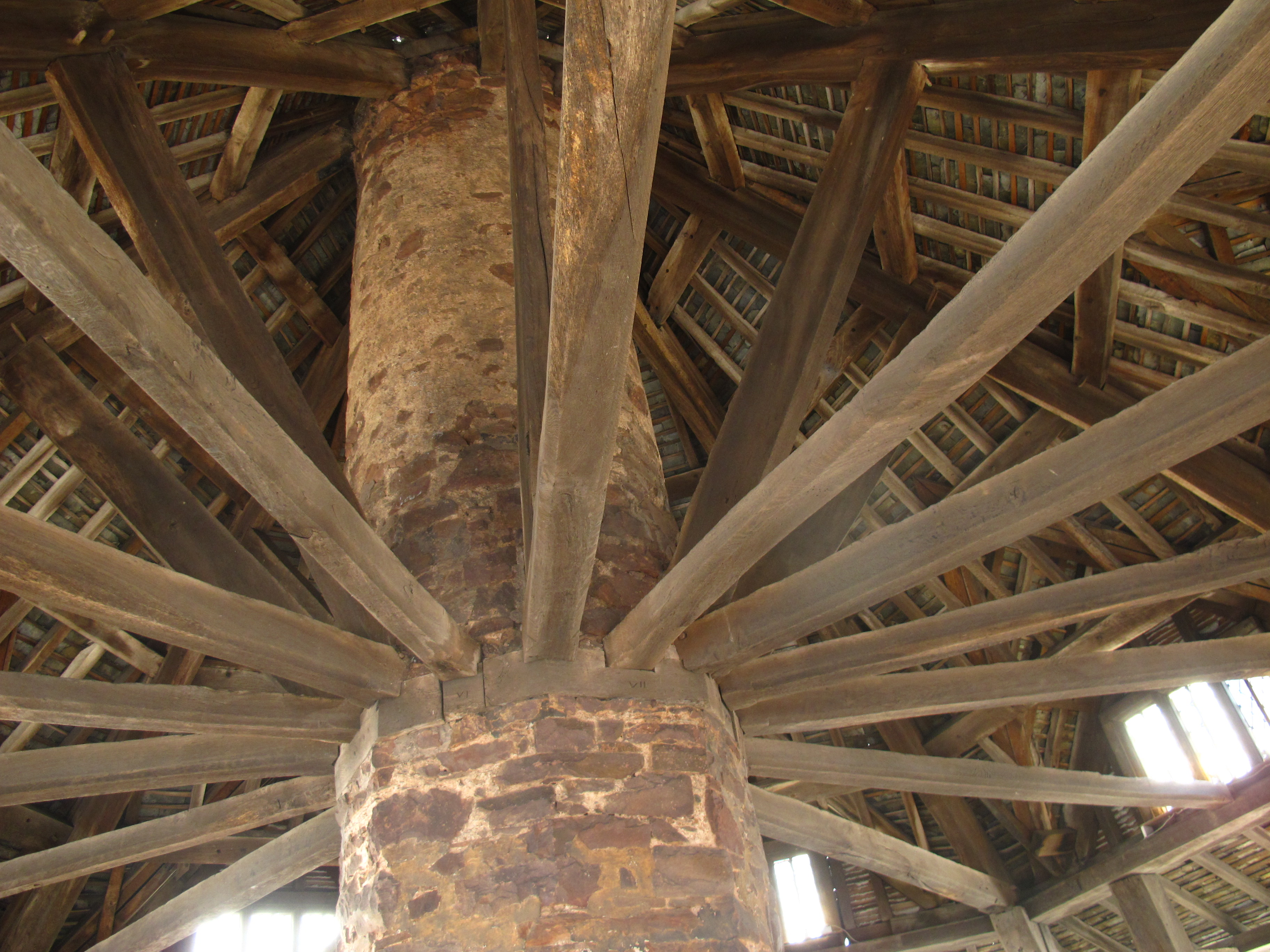
View of the supporting structure of the roof

The octagonal building, which is 9.4 metres (31 ft) in diameter, has a central stone pier which supports a heavy timber framework for the structure. The slate roof has a central wooden lantern topped by a weather vane. The roof is interrupted by a series of dormer windows. Around the periphery is a low wall and vertical timber supports. Some of the sills are stone and others timber.

One of the roof beams has a hole in it, a result of cannon fire in the Civil War, when Dunster Castle was a besieged Royalist stronghold for five months under the command of Colonel Wyndham. Following the damage, it was restored in 1647 to its present condition by Francis Luttrell.

The building was the inspiration for the Rest House, on Bournville Village Green in Birmingham, which was built in 1914 to commemorate the silver wedding anniversary of George and Elizabeth Cadbury.

== See also ==
- Grade I listed buildings in West Somerset
- List of scheduled monuments in West Somerset
