= Dunster Dovecote =

Dovecote
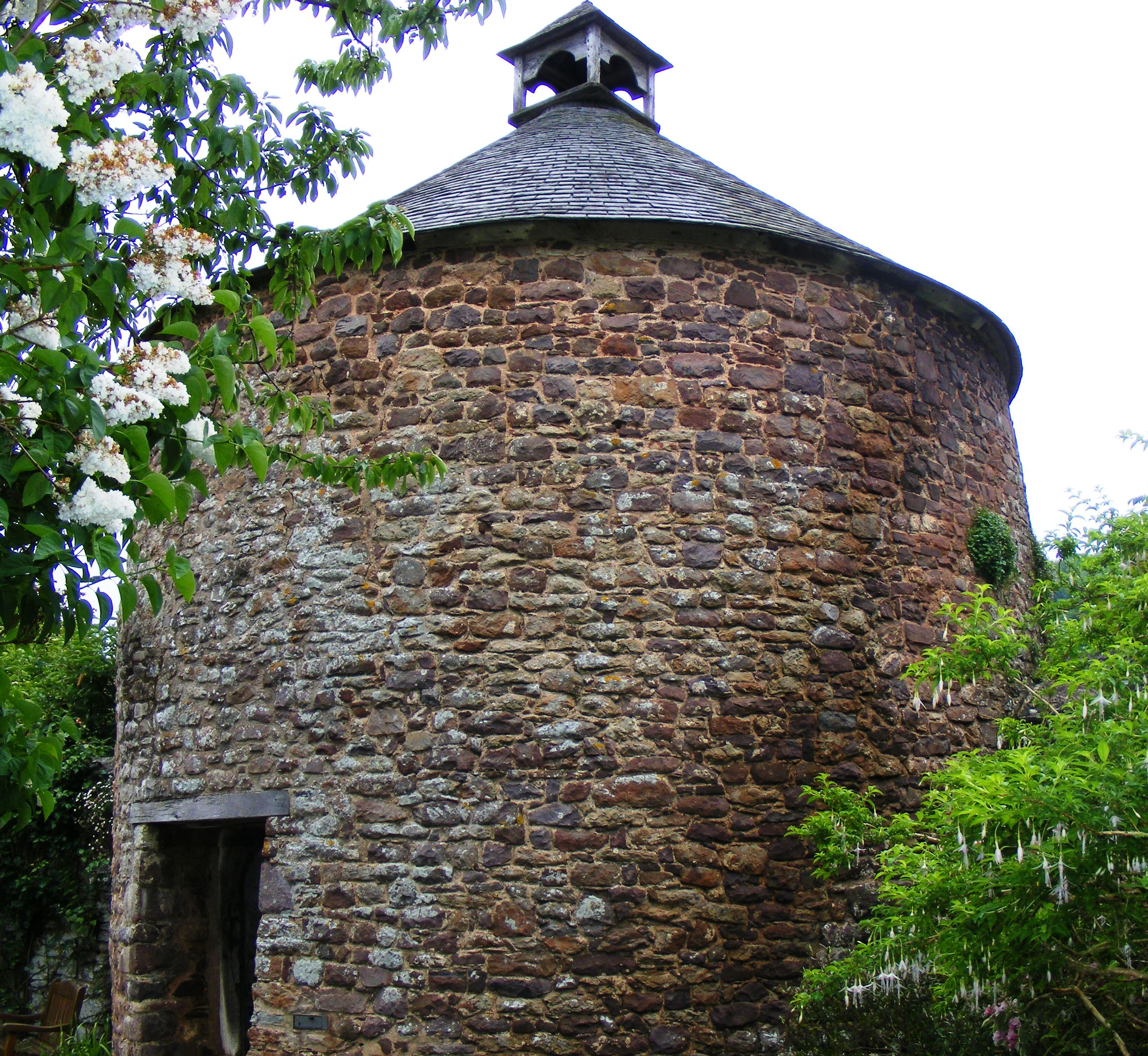

- Location within Somerset
- 51°11′01″N 3°26′46″W
- Location: Dunster, Somerset, England

History
- Built: 16th century
- Built for: Priory of Dunster

Listed Building – Grade II*
- Official name: Dovecote, Priory Green
- Designated: 22 May 1969
- Reference no.: 1057581

Scheduled monument
- Official name: Dovecote 60m north of St George's Church
- Designated: 20 May 1963
- Reference no.: 1020408

The Dovecote in Dunster, Somerset, England was probably built in the late 16th century. It has been designated as a Grade II* listed building and Scheduled Monument.

It is situated on Priory Green opposite the Tithe Barn and close to the walls of the Priory Church of St George. It is approximately 19 feet (5.8 m) high and 19 feet (5.8 m) in diameter, with walls around 4 feet (1.2 m) thick. There are five hundred and forty nest-holes.

There is no documentary evidence for the dovecote's date of construction, but some of the architectural features suggest it may have been as long ago as the 14th century. It would originally have belonged to the Benedictine Priory of Dunster which was a cell of Bath Abbey. Domestic pigeons were kept to provide squabs a luxury food from the breast meat of young pigeons. From the 12th century until 1619, only lords of the manor and parish priests were allowed to keep them. The priory was abolished in the dissolution of the monasteries in 1539, and property belonging to it was sold to the Luttrell family of Dunster Castle.

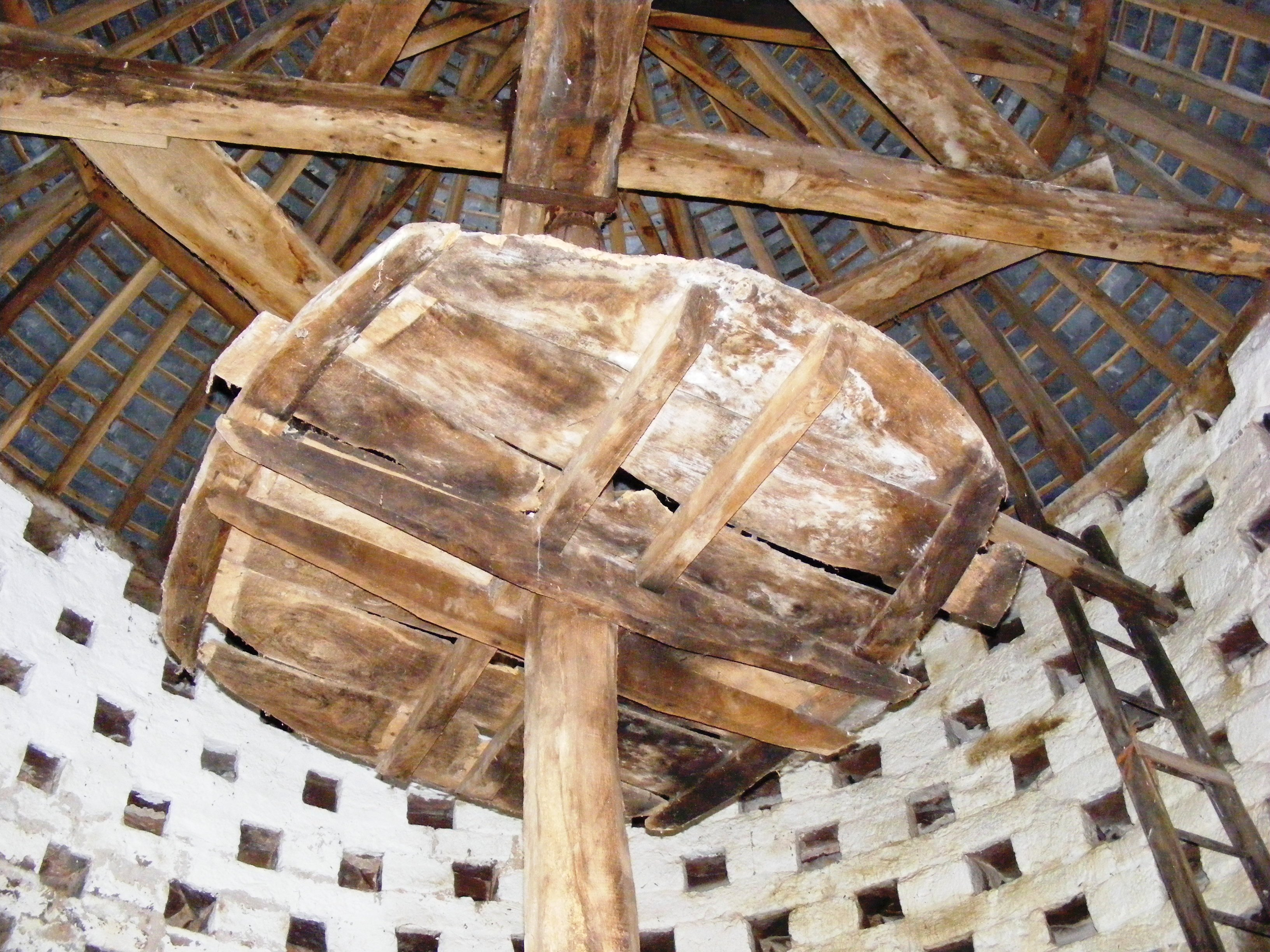
The interior showing the feeding platform, ladder and nest holes

In the 18th century the floor level and door were raised among several major alterations. The lower tiers of nest holes were blocked to protect against brown rats which had arrived in the Britain in 1720 and reached Somerset by 1760. A revolving ladder, known as a "potence", was installed to allow the pigeon keeper to search the nest holes more easily. In the 19th century two feeding platforms were added to the axis of the revolving ladder. When the ladder was installed in the 16th century, the base rested on a pin driven into a beam on the floor. The head of the pin sits in a metal cup at the base of the wooden pillar, which means the mechanism has never had to be oiled.

When the Dunster Castle estate was sold, the dovecote was bought by the Parochial church council and opened to the public. Extensive repairs were undertaken in 1989.
