= Dunster =

Village in Somerset, England

Coordinates: 51.1825°N 3.4459°W

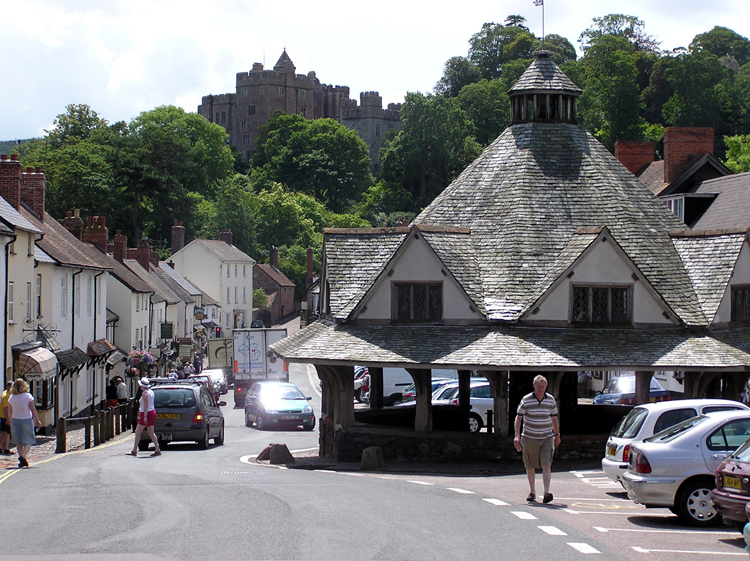
- Dunster Yarn Market in the foreground and Dunster Castle on the skyline.

- Location within Somerset
- Population: 863 (Parish, 2021)
- OS grid reference: SS990436
- Unitary authority: Somerset
- Ceremonial county: Somerset
- Region: South West
- Country: England
- Sovereign state: United Kingdom
- Post town: MINEHEAD
- Postcode district: TA24
- Dialling code: 01643
- Police: Avon and Somerset
- Fire: Devon and Somerset
- Ambulance: South Western
- UK Parliament: Tiverton and Minehead
- Website: Dunster Village website

Dunster is a village and civil parish in Somerset, England, within the north-eastern boundary of Exmoor National Park. It lies on the Bristol Channel 2.5 miles (4 km) southeast of Minehead and 20 miles (32 km) northwest of Taunton. At the 2021 census, the parish had a population of 863.

There are Iron Age hillforts in the area. Saxon Dunster was a parish in the Hundred of Carhampton. In the Domesday book there are four manors within the parish: Aucome (Alcombe), Avena (Avill), Stantune (Stanton) and Torre. Torre is now the site of the village of Dunster. Torre, including the castle and two watermills, was valued at 15 shillings and Aucome 20 shillings. The village grew up around Dunster Castle which was built at Torre by the Norman warrior William I de Moyon (d. post 1090) shortly after the Norman Conquest of 1066. The castle is mentioned in the Domesday Book of 1086. From that time it was the caput of the Feudal barony of Dunster. The castle was remodelled on several occasions by the Luttrell family who were lords of the manor from the 14th to 20th centuries. The benedictine Dunster Priory was established in about 1100. The Priory Church of St George, dovecote and tithe barn are all relics from the Priory.

The village became a centre for wool and cloth production and trade, of which the Yarn Market, built by George Luttrell (d.1629), is a relic. There existed formerly a harbour, known as Dunster Haven, at the mouth of the River Avill, but today, the coast having receded, it is now about one-half mile (0.80 km) from the village and no sign of the harbour can be seen on the low lying marshes between the village and the coast. Dunster has a range of heritage sites and cultural attractions which combine with the castle to make it a popular tourist destination with many visitors arriving on the West Somerset Railway, a heritage railway running from Minehead to Bishops Lydeard.

The village lies on the route of the Macmillan Way West, Somerset Way and Celtic Way.

== Toponymy ==
The name Dunster comes from the Old English term tor, meaning a rocky outcrop, to which the name of a person called Dun or Dunn was later added.

== History ==
Within two miles (3.2 km) of the village itself are several Iron Age hillforts showing evidence of early human occupation. These include Bat's Castle and Black Ball Camp on Gallox Hill, Long Wood Enclosure and a similar earthwork on Grabbist Hill.

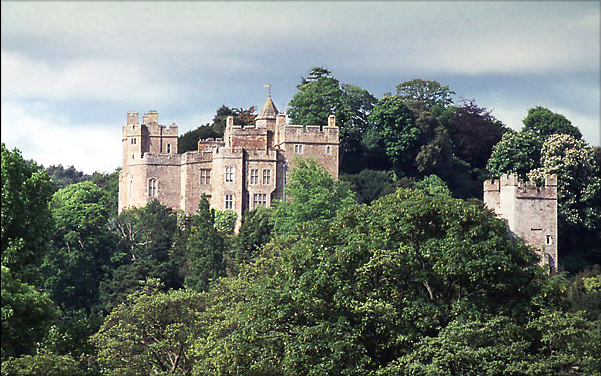
Dunster Castle

Dunster is mentioned as a parish and Dunster Castle as belonging to William I de Moyon (alias de Moion, also de Mohun) in the 1086 Domesday Book. After the Norman conquest of England in the 11th century, he constructed a timber castle on the site as part of the pacification of Somerset. A stone shell keep was built on the motte by the start of the 12th century, and the castle survived a siege during the early years of the Anarchy. At the end of the 14th century the de Mohuns sold the castle to the Luttrell family, who continued to occupy the property until the late 20th century. During the English Civil War, Dunster was initially held as a garrison for the Royalists. It fell to the Parliamentarians in 1645 and orders were sent out for the castle to be demolished. However, these were not carried out, and the castle remained the garrison for Parliamentarian troops until 1650. Dunster is regularly home to Taunton Garrison who re-enact plays, battles, and life in the civil war. Major alterations to the castle were undertaken by Henry Fownes Luttrell who had acquired it through marriage to Margaret Fownes-Luttrell in 1747. Following the death of Alexander Luttrell in 1944, the family was unable to afford the death duties on his estate. The castle and surrounding lands were sold off to a property firm, the family continuing to live in the castle as tenants. The Luttrells bought back the castle in 1954, but in 1976 Colonel Walter Luttrell gave Dunster Castle and most of its contents to the National Trust, which operates it as a tourist attraction. It is a Grade I listed building and scheduled monument.

Dunster Priory was established as a Benedictine monastery around 1100. The first church in Dunster was built by William de Mohun who gave the church and the tithes of several manors and two fisheries, to the Benedictine Abbey at Bath. The priory, which was situated just north of the church, became a cell of the abbey. The church was shared for worship by the monks and the parishioners, however this led to several conflicts between them. One outcome was the carved rood screen which divided the church in two with the parish using the west chancel and the monks the east. The priory church is now in parochial use as the Priory Church of St George which still contains 12th and 13th century work, although most of the current building is from the 15th century. It has been designated as a Grade I listed building. In 1332 it became more separated from the Abbey at Bath and became a priory in its own right. In the "Valor Ecclesiasticus" of 1535 the net annual income of the Dunster Tithe Barn is recorded as being £37.4.8d (£37 23p), with £6.13s7d ( £6.68p ) being passed on to the priory in Bath. In 1346 Cleeve Abbey built a nunnery in Dunster, but it was never inhabited by nuns and was used as a guest house. The priory was dissolved as part of the dissolution of the monasteries in 1539. Dunster was part of the hundred of Carhampton, but St George's was the seat of the local deanery, overseeing the area's parish churches.

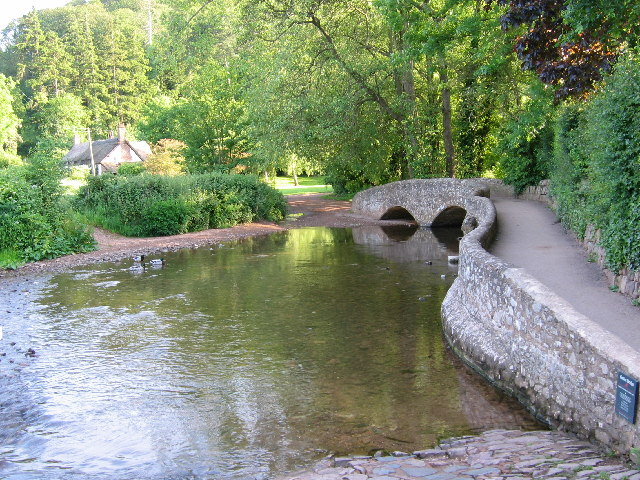
Gallox Bridge

The manors of Alcombe, Stanton (or Staunton), and Avill were also mentioned as settlements in the 1086 Domesday Book.

Dunster had become a centre for woollen and clothing production by the 13th century, with the market dating back to at least 1222, and a particular kind of kersey or broadcloth became known as 'Dunsters'. The prosperity of Dunster was based on the wool trade, with profits helping to pay for the construction of the tower of the Priory Church of St George and provide other amenities. The 15th century Gallox Bridge was one of the main routes over the River Avill on the southern outskirts. The market was held in "The Shambles" however these shops were demolished in 1825 and now only the Yarn Market remains.

Dunster Beach, which includes the mouth of the River Avill, is located half a mile from the village, and used to have a significant harbour, known as Dunster Haven, which was used for the export of wool from Saxon times; however, it was last used in the 17th century and has now disappeared, as new land was laid down among the dykes, meadows and marshes near the shore. During the Second World War, considerable defences were built along the coast as a part of British anti-invasion preparations, though the north coast of Somerset was an unlikely invasion site. Some of the structures remain to this day. Most notable are the pillboxes on the foreshore of Dunster Beach. These are strong buildings made from pebbles taken from the beach and bonded together with concrete. From these, soldiers could have held their ground if the Germans had ever invaded. The beach site has a number of privately owned beach huts (or chalets as some owners call them) along with a small shop, a tennis court and a putting green. The chalets, measuring 18 by 14 feet (5.5 by 4.3 m), can be let out for holidays; some owners live in them all the year round.

== Governance ==
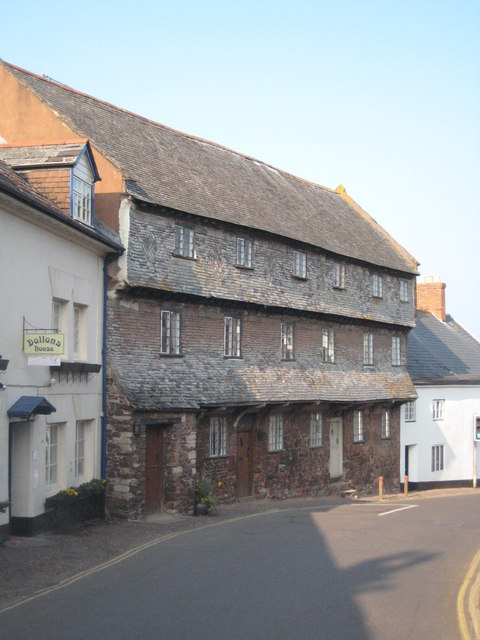
The Nunnery

The parish council has responsibility for local issues, including setting an annual precept to cover the council's operating costs and producing annual accounts for public scrutiny. The parish council evaluates local planning applications and works with the local police, district council officers, and neighbourhood watch groups on matters of crime, security, and traffic. The parish council's role also includes initiating projects for the maintenance and repair of parish facilities, as well as consulting with the district council on the maintenance, repair, and improvement of highways, drainage, footpaths, public transport, and street cleaning. Conservation matters (including trees and listed buildings) and environmental issues are also the responsibility of the council.

For local government purposes, since 1 April 2023, the parish comes under the unitary authority of Somerset Council. Prior to this, it was part of the non-metropolitan district of Somerset West and Taunton (formed on 1 April 2019) and, before this, the district of West Somerset (established under the Local Government Act 1972). It was part of Williton Rural District before 1974.

As Dunster falls within the Exmoor National Park, some functions normally administered by district or county councils have, since 1997, fallen under the Exmoor National Park Authority, which is known as a 'single-purpose' authority, whose purpose is to "conserve and enhance the natural beauty, wildlife and cultural heritage of the National Parks" and "promote opportunities for the understanding and enjoyment of the special qualities of the Parks by the public", including responsibility for the conservation of the historic environment.

Dunster is the most populous area of the electoral ward Dunster and Timbercombe. The ward extends North East to the Bristol Channel and South West to Timberscombe. The total population at the 2011 Census was 1,219.

It is also part of the Tiverton and Minehead county constituency represented in the House of Commons of the Parliament of the United Kingdom. It elects one Member of parliament (MP) by the first past the post system of election.

== Geography ==
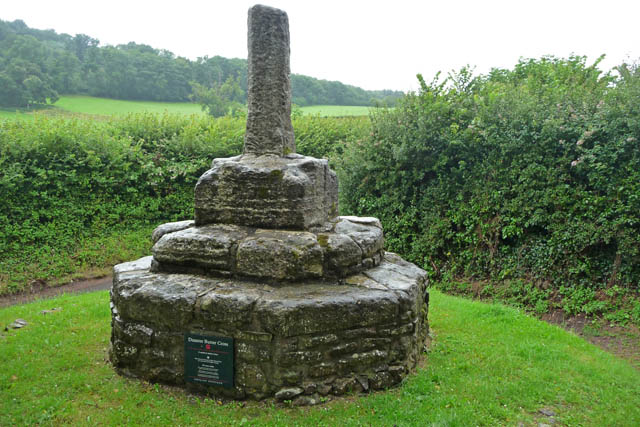
Dunster Butter Cross

Dunster Castle was positioned on a steep, 200-foot (61 m) high hill. Geologically, the hill is an outcrop of Hangman Grits, a type of red sandstone. During the early medieval period the sea reached the base of the hill, close to the mouth of the River Avill, offering a natural defence and making the village an inland port.

Nearby is the Dunster Park and Heathlands Site of Special Scientific Interest noted for nationally important lowland dry heath, dry lowland acid grassland, wood-pasture with veteran trees and ancient semi-natural oak woodland habitats. The fauna of the lowland heath includes the heath fritillary (Mellicta athalia), a nationally rare butterfly. The assemblage of beetles associated with the veteran trees is of national significance because of the variety and abundance of species.

Along with the rest of South West England, Dunster has a temperate climate which is generally wetter and milder than the rest of England. The mean annual temperature in the area is 8.3 °C (46.9 °F) with a seasonal and diurnal variation, but due to the modifying effect of the sea the range is less than in most other parts of the UK. January is the coldest month, with mean minimum temperatures between 1 and 2 °C (34 and 36 °F). July and August are the warmest months in the region, with mean daily maxima around 21 °C (70 °F). In general, December is the month with the least sunshine and June the month with the most sun. The south west of England has a favoured location with regard to the Azores High when it extends its influence north-eastwards towards the UK, particularly in summer. Cloud often forms inland, especially near hills, and reduce the amount of sunshine that reaches the park. The average annual sunshine is about 1,600 hours. Rainfall tends to be associated with Atlantic depressions or with convection. In summer, convection, caused by the sun heating the land surface more than the sea, sometimes forms rain clouds and at that time of year a large proportion of the rainfall comes from showers and thunderstorms. Annual precipitation is around 800 mm (31 in). Local weather data is collected at Nettlecombe.

Climate data for Nettlecombe 96 m asl, 1971–2000
Month	Jan	Feb	Mar	Apr	May	Jun	Jul	Aug	Sep	Oct	Nov	Dec	Year
Mean daily maximum °C (°F)	7.9 (46.2)	8.0 (46.4)	10.2 (50.4)	12.2 (54.0)	15.6 (60.1)	18.3 (64.9)	20.7 (69.3)	20.5 (68.9)	17.8 (64.0)	14.2 (57.6)	10.8 (51.4)	8.8 (47.8)	13.8 (56.8)
Mean daily minimum °C (°F)	1.9 (35.4)	1.8 (35.2)	3.0 (37.4)	3.6 (38.5)	6.2 (43.2)	8.8 (47.8)	10.9 (51.6)	10.8 (51.4)	9.0 (48.2)	6.7 (44.1)	4.1 (39.4)	2.9 (37.2)	5.8 (42.4)
Average precipitation mm (inches)	123.6 (4.87)	87.6 (3.45)	80.6 (3.17)	66.3 (2.61)	62.6 (2.46)	58.7 (2.31)	43.4 (1.71)	66.5 (2.62)	85.4 (3.36)	108.6 (4.28)	106.6 (4.20)	128.7 (5.07)	1,018.6 (40.10)
Source: MetOffice

== Economy ==
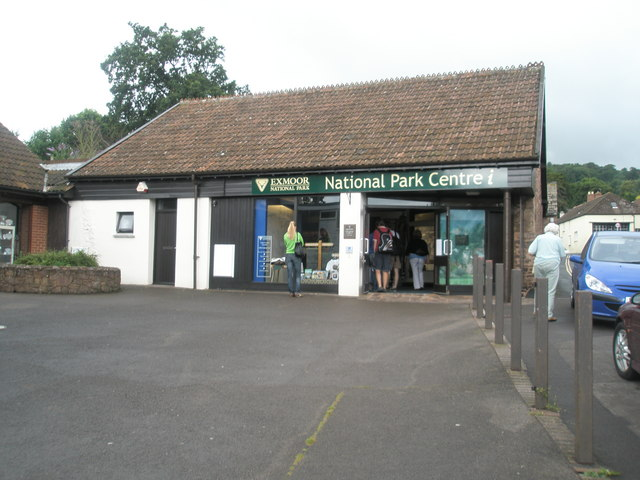
The Exmoor National Park visitor centre

The village provides a variety of shops and amenities for both local residents and visitors. These are largely situated in West Street and the high street. The village has numerous restaurants and three pubs with considerable trade being brought by tourists visiting the heritage sites and particularly the castle which attracted approximately 150,000 visitors in 2014. Although there is still some agriculture, the previous reliance on the wool trade has been replaced by service industries catering to the visitors. Both day-trippers and those staying for longer periods are catered for with shops, pubs, cafes and hotels.

== Culture ==
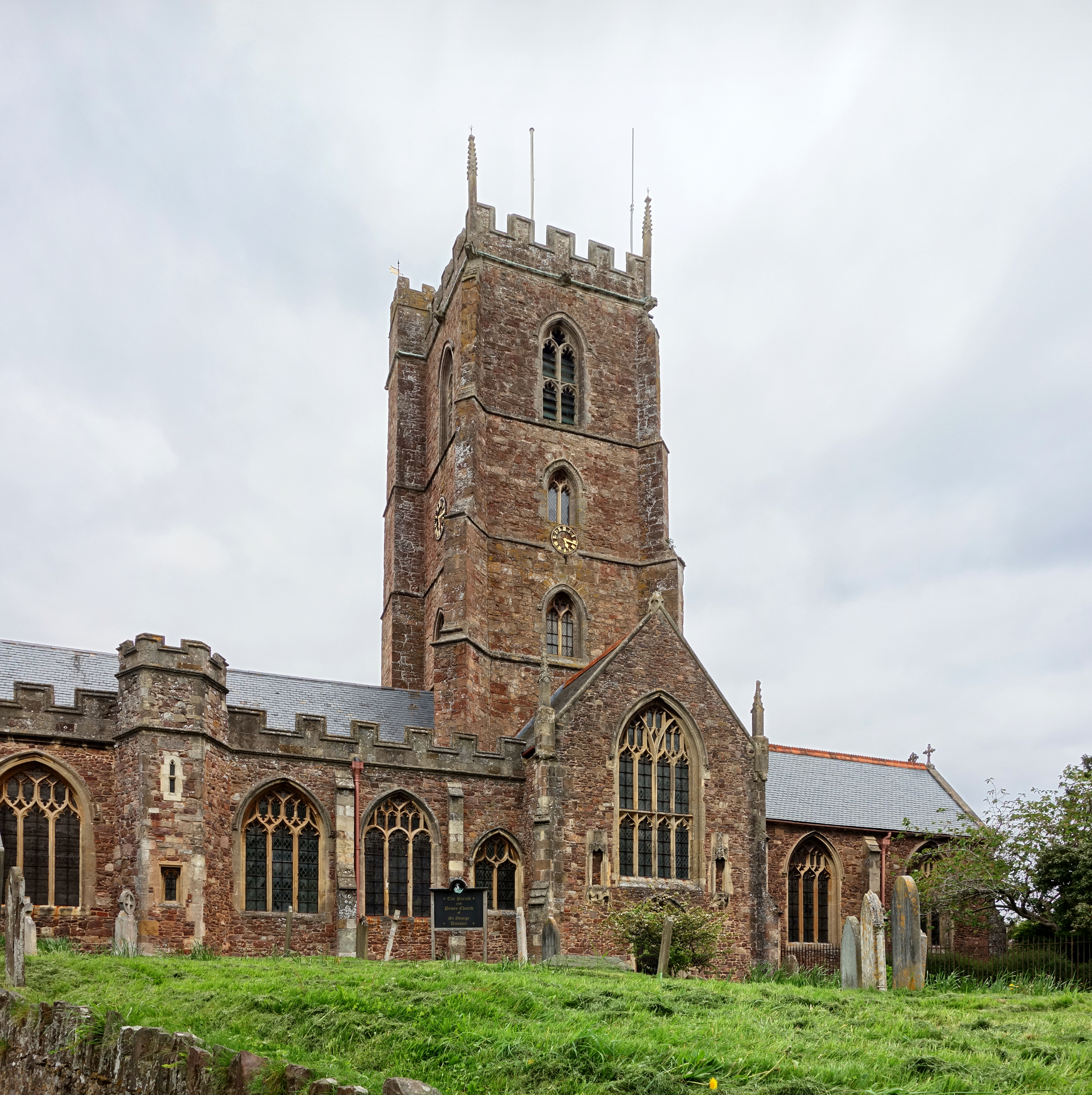
Priory Church of St George

Dunster was the birthplace of the song "All Things Bright and Beautiful" when Cecil Alexander was staying with Mary Martin, the daughter of one of the owners of Martins Bank. The nearby hill, Grabbist, was originally heather-covered before its reforestation and was described as the "Purple-headed mountain".

On the evening of 1 May each year the Minehead Hobby Horse visits Dunster and is received at the Castle. A local newspaper printed in May 1863 says "The origin professes to be in commemoration of the wreck of a vessel at Minehead in remote times, or the advent of a sort of phantom ship which entered the harbour without Captain or crew. Once the custom was encouraged, but now is much neglected, and perhaps soon will fall into desuetude." Another conjecture about its origin is that the hobby horse was the ancient King of the May. The Hobby Horse tradition begins with the waking of the inhabitants of Minehead by the beating of a loud drum. The hobby horse dances its way about the town and on to Dunster Castle.

Annually on the third Friday in August the village hosts the well known Dunster Show where local businesses and producers come together to showcase the very best that Exmoor and West Somerset has to offer. A major part of the show is the showing of livestock especially horses, cattle and sheep. The 2023 show was the 175th show. No shows were held in 2020 or 2021 due to the Coronavirus pandemic.

A more recent tradition (started in 1987) is Dunster by Candlelight which takes place every year on the first Friday and Saturday in December when this remarkably preserved medieval village turns its back on the present and lights its streets with candles. To mark the beginning of the festival on Friday at 5 pm, there is the Lantern Lighting Procession that starts on the Steep and continues through the village until all the lanterns in the streets have been lit. The procession of children and their families is accompanied by colourful stilt walkers in costumes who put up the lanterns.

The old English Christmas tradition of burning the Ashen faggot takes place at the Luttrell Arms hotel every Christmas Eve. The pub was formerly a guest house for the Abbots of Cleeve; its oldest section dates from 1443.

Bells ringing at St George's Church, Dunster. (Note: The ring of eight bells was re-cast and re-hung in 1875 by Messrs John Warner and Sons of London, at the sole cost of George Luttrell.(Hancock 1905, pp. 67–71) Frederick Hancock (1849–1920) was the vicar of Dunster.)

== Religious sites ==
The Priory Church of St George is predominantly 15th century with evidence of 12th- and 13th century work. It has been designated as a Grade I listed building. The church was started by William de Moyon during the 11th century.The tower was built by Jon Marys of Stogursey who received a contract from the parish in 1442. He was paid 13s 4d (approx. 67p) for each foot in height and £1 for the pinnacles. The work was completed in three years. Aisles were added in 1504.

The church was shared for worship between the monks of Dunster Priory and the parishioners, however this led to several conflicts between them. One outcome was the carved rood screen which divided the church in two with the parish using the west chancel and the monks the east. It was restored in 1875–77 by George Edmund Street. The church has a cruciform plan with a central four-stage tower, built in 1443 with diagonal buttresses, a stair turret and single bell-chamber windows.

== Landmarks ==
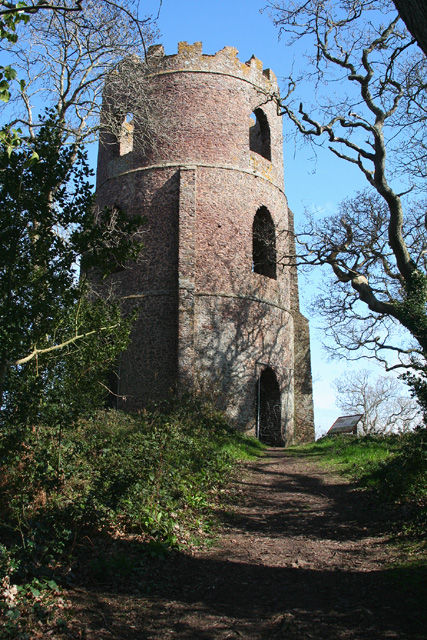
Conygar Tower

Dunster lies within Exmoor National Park and has many listed buildings, including 200 Grade II, two Grade II* and two Grade I.

The 17th century Yarn Market is a market cross which was probably built in 1609 by the Luttrell family who were the local lords of the manor to maintain the importance of the village as a market, particularly for wool and cloth. The Yarn Market is an octagonal building constructed around a central pier. The tiled roof provides shelter from the rain. The building contains a hole in one of the roof beams, a result of cannon fire in the Civil War. A bell at the top was rung to indicate the start of trading.

Nearby was an older cross known as the Butter Cross which was constructed in the late 14th or early 15th century and once stood in the High Street, possibly at the southern end of the high street, and was moved to its current location on the edge of the village possibly in 1825, however a drawing by J. M. W. Turner made in 1811 suggests it was in its present position by then. The site where the cross now stands was leveled in 1776 by workman, paid by Henry Fownes Luttrell, and it may have been on this occasion that the cross was moved. The cross has an octagonal base and polygonal shaft, however the head of the cross has been lost. It stands on a small area of raised ground on a plinth. The socket stone is 0.85 metres (2 ft 9 in) wide and 0.5 metres (1 ft 8 in) high. The surviving shaft is 1.1 metres (3 ft 7 in) high and changes from square to octagonal as it rises. There is an inscription on the northern face which says "WC, 1871, WS" recording a restoration. It is in the care of English Heritage for the state and managed by the National Trust.

Other notable buildings include the Nunnery, Dunster Watermill, Dovecote and the Priory barn, which belonged to Dunster Priory. Dunster Working Watermill (also known as Castle Mill) is a restored 18th century watermill, situated on the River Avill, close to Gallox Bridge, in the grounds of Dunster Castle. It is a Grade II* listed building. The mill stands on a site where a mill was first recorded in the Domesday Book, but the present building was constructed around 1780. It closed in 1962 but was restored in 1979 and is still used to grind flour. The equipment is powered by two overshot wheels. It is owned by the National Trust but operated as a tourist attraction by a private company.

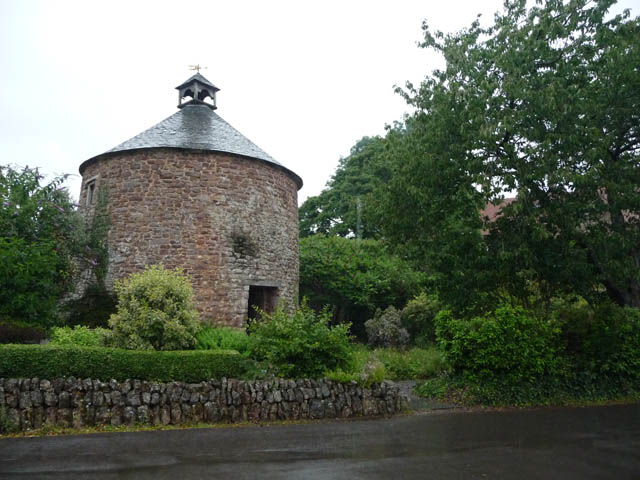
Dunster Dovecote

The Dovecote was probably built in the late 16th century. It has been designated as a Grade II* listed building and Scheduled Monument. It is approximately 19 feet (5.8 m) high and 19 feet (5.8 m) in diameter, with walls around 4 feet (1.2 m) thick. In the 18th century the floor level and door were raised among several major alterations. The lower tiers of nest holes were blocked to protect against brown rats which had arrived in the Britain in 1720 and reached Somerset by 1760. A revolving ladder, known as a "potence", was installed to allow the pigeon keeper to search the nest holes more easily. In the 19th century two feeding platforms were added to the axis of the revolving ladder. When the ladder was installed in the 16th century the base rests on a pin driven into a beam on the floor. The head of the pin sits in a metal cup in the base of the wooden pillar, which means the mechanism has never had to be oiled. When the Dunster Castle estate was sold the dovecote was bought by the Parochial church council and opened to the public. Extensive repairs were undertaken in 1989.

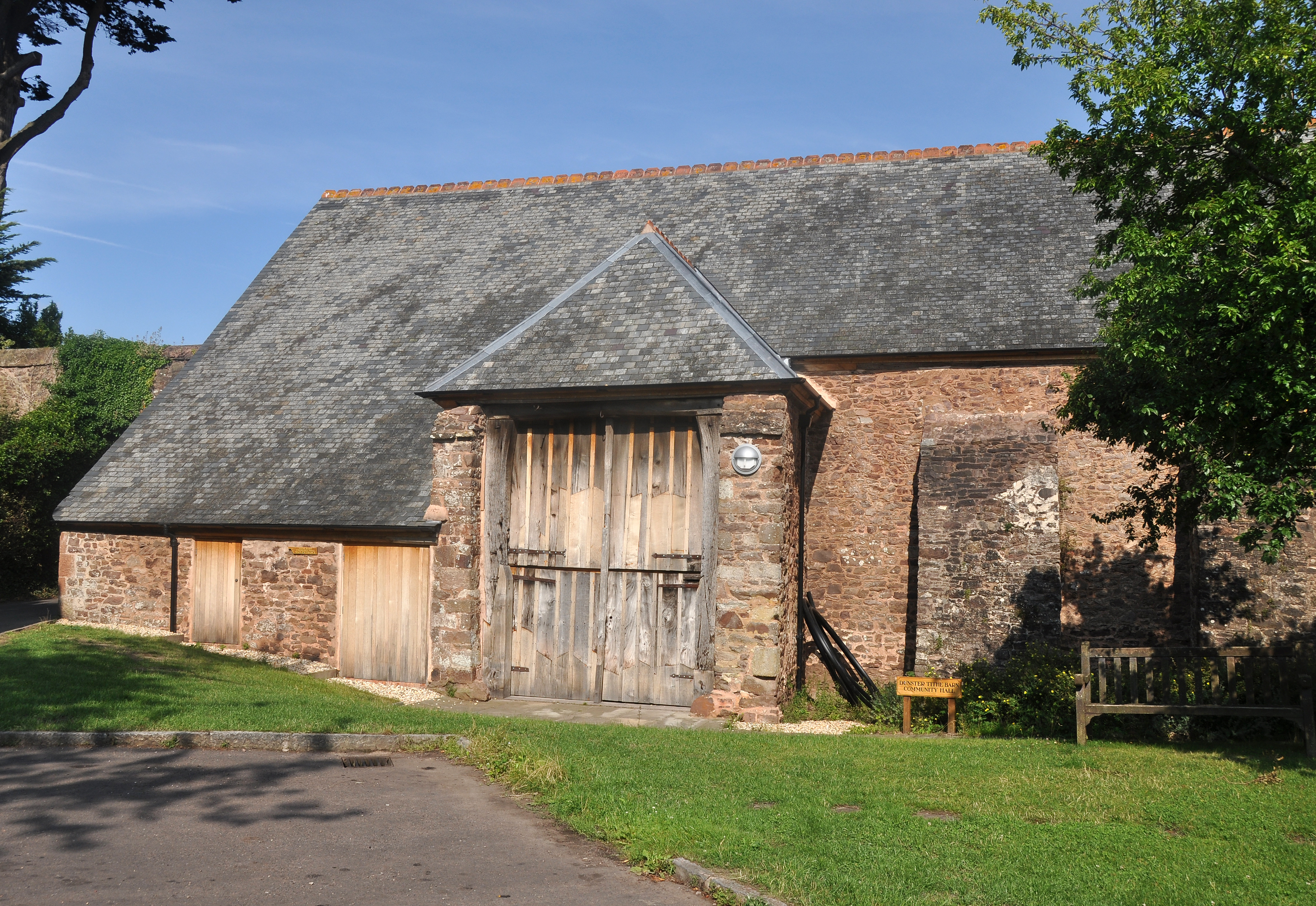
Tithe Barn

The Tithe Barn was originally part of a Benedictine Dunster Priory, has been much altered since the 14th century and only a limited amount of the original features survive. In the "Valor Ecclesiasticus" of 1535 the net annual income of the Dunster Tithe Barn is recorded as being £37.4s.8d (£37.23p), with £6.13s.7d ( £6.68p ) being passed on to the priory in Bath. The Somerset Buildings Preservation Trust (SBPT) has co-ordinated a £550,000 renovation project on behalf of the Dunster Tithe Barn Community Hall Trust (DTBCHT), into a multi-purpose community hall under a 99-year lease at a pepper-corn rent, by the Crown Estate Commissioners who own the building. Funding has been obtained from the Heritage Lottery Fund and others to support the work.

Conygar Tower is a folly used as a landmark for shipping. It is at the top of Conygar Hill and overlooks the village. It is a circular, 3 storey tower built of red sandstone, situated on a hill overlooking the village. It was commissioned by Henry Luttrell and designed by Richard Phelps and stands about 18 metres (59 ft) high so that it can be seen from Dunster Castle on the opposite hillside. There is no evidence that it ever had floors or a roof. It has no strategic or military significance. The name Conygar comes from two medieval words Coney meaning rabbit and Garth meaning garden, indicating that it was once a warren where rabbits were bred for food. In 1997 a survey carried out by The Crown Estate identified cracks in the walls which were repaired in 2000.

Dunster Doll Museum houses a collection of more than 800 dolls from around the world, based on the collection of the late Mollie Hardwick, who died in 1970 and donated her collection to the village memorial hall committee. Established in 1971, the collection includes a display of British and foreign dolls in various costumes. Thirty-two of the dolls were stolen during a burglary in 1992 and have never been recovered.

== Transport ==
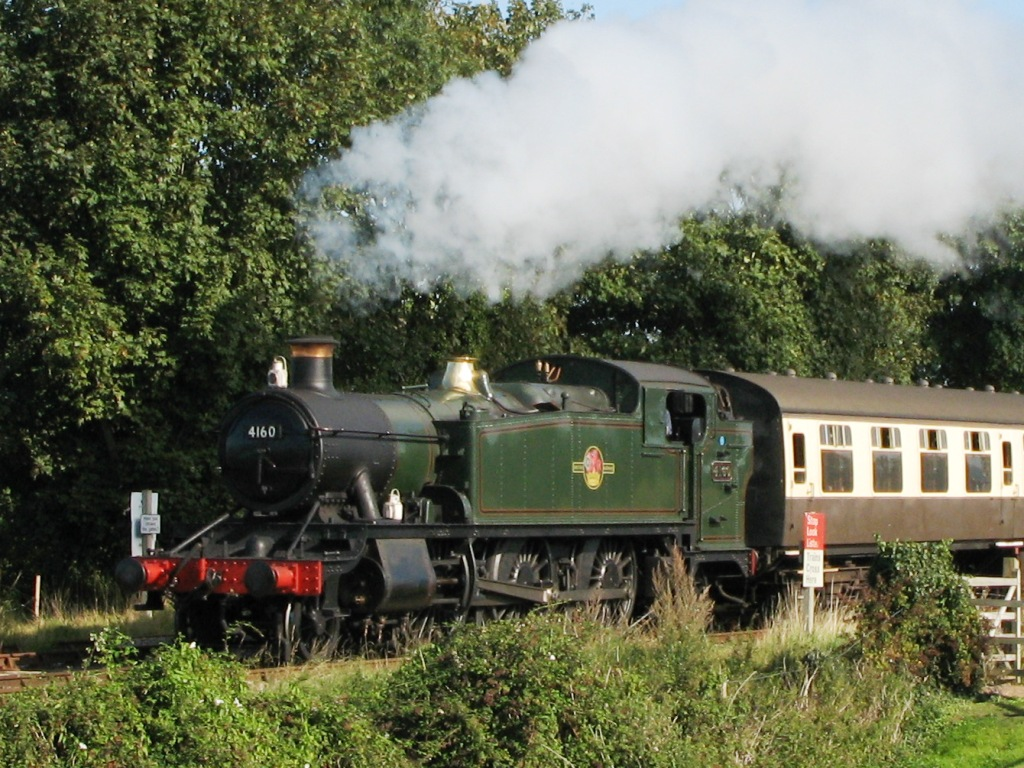
An engine on the West Somerset Heritage Railway arrives at Dunster railway station

Dunster railway station is on the West Somerset Heritage Railway, though the station is over a mile from the village. The station was opened on 16 July 1874 by the Minehead Railway. The line was operated by the Bristol and Exeter Railway which was amalgamated into the Great Western Railway (GWR) in 1876. The Minehead Railway was itself absorbed into the GWR in 1897. A small signal box stood at the Watchet end of the platform, but was demolished in 1926 when this was extended. In 1934 a new signal box at the opposite end of the station, brought second-hand from Maerdy, was put into use when the line from Dunster to Minehead was doubled in 1934. The GWR was nationalised into British Railways in 1948 and from 1964, when goods traffic was withdrawn on 6 July, the line was run down until it was eventually closed on 4 January 1971. The line was reopened as a heritage railway operated by the West Somerset Railway on 28 March 1976. The signal box was moved to Minehead in 1977 but the goods yard is now home to the railway's civil engineering team. It is a Grade II listed building.

Road access is via the A39 and A396. The nearest international airports would be those at Exeter or Bristol.

== Education ==
Dunster First School provides primary education for children from 4 to 9 years. In 2015 the school had 143 pupils. The Grade II listed building was originally constructed in the 1870s. It has since been modified and expanded and now includes a heated outdoor swimming pool. Middle education in the area is provided by Danesfield School and Minehead Middle School; while secondary education in the area is provided by West Somerset College in Minehead.

== Bibliography ==
- Adkins, Lesley and Roy (1992). A field guide to Somerset Archeology. Dovecote Press. ISBN 978-0946159949.
- Bryant, R.G. (1977). Dunster Village Church and Castle (3rd ed.). R.G. Bryant.
- Burnett, E. (1969). Dunster, Somerset. Dunster Traders Association.
- Byford, Enid (1987). Somerset Curiosities. The Dovecote Press. ISBN 978-0946159482.
- Concannon, Bernard (1995). The History of Dunster Beach. Monkspath Books. ISBN 0-9526884-0-9.
- Creighton, Oliver; Higham, Robert (2003). Medieval Castles. Osprey Publishing. ISBN 9780747805465.
- Dunning, Robert (1995). Somerset Castles. Somerset: Somerset Books. ISBN 978-0861832781.
- Dunning, Robert (2007). Somerset Churches and Chapels: Building Repair and Restoration. Halsgrove. ISBN 978-1841145921.
- Dunning, Robert (2001). Somerset Monasteries. Tempus. ISBN 978-0-7524-1941-1.
- Ekwall, Eilert (1960). The Concise Oxford Dictionary of English Place Names. Oxford University Press. ISBN 978-0-19-869103-7.
- Farr, Grahame (1954). Somerset Harbours. London: Christopher Johnson.
- Foot, William (2006). Beaches, fields, streets, and hills ... the anti-invasion landscapes of England, 1940. Council for British Archaeology. ISBN 1-902771-53-2.
- Garnett, Oliver (2003). Dunster Castle. National Trust. ISBN 978-1843590491.
- Hancock, Frederick, Rev. (1905). Dunster Church and Priory: Their History and Architectural Features. Taunton: Barnicott & Pearce, Athænum Press.
- Mackenzie, James D. (1897). The Castles of England, Their Story and Structure. W. Heinemann. OCLC 504892038.
- Poulton-Smith, Anthony (2010). Somerset Place Names. Amberley. ISBN 9781848687820.
- Poyntz Wright, Peter (1981). The Parish Church Towers of Somerset, Their construction, craftsmanship and chronology 1350–1550. Avebury Publishing Company. ISBN 0-86127-502-0.
- Prior, Stuart (2006). The Norman Art of War: A Few Well-Positioned Castles. Tempus Publishing. ISBN 9780752436517.
- Robinson, Stephen (1992). Somerset Place Names. Dovecote Press. ISBN 978-1874336037.
- Woodger, Bev (2014). A History of Dunster. Matador. ISBN 9781783064441.
