= Dunster Priory =

Monastery in Dunster, Somerset, England

Coordinates: 51.1836°N 3.4484°W

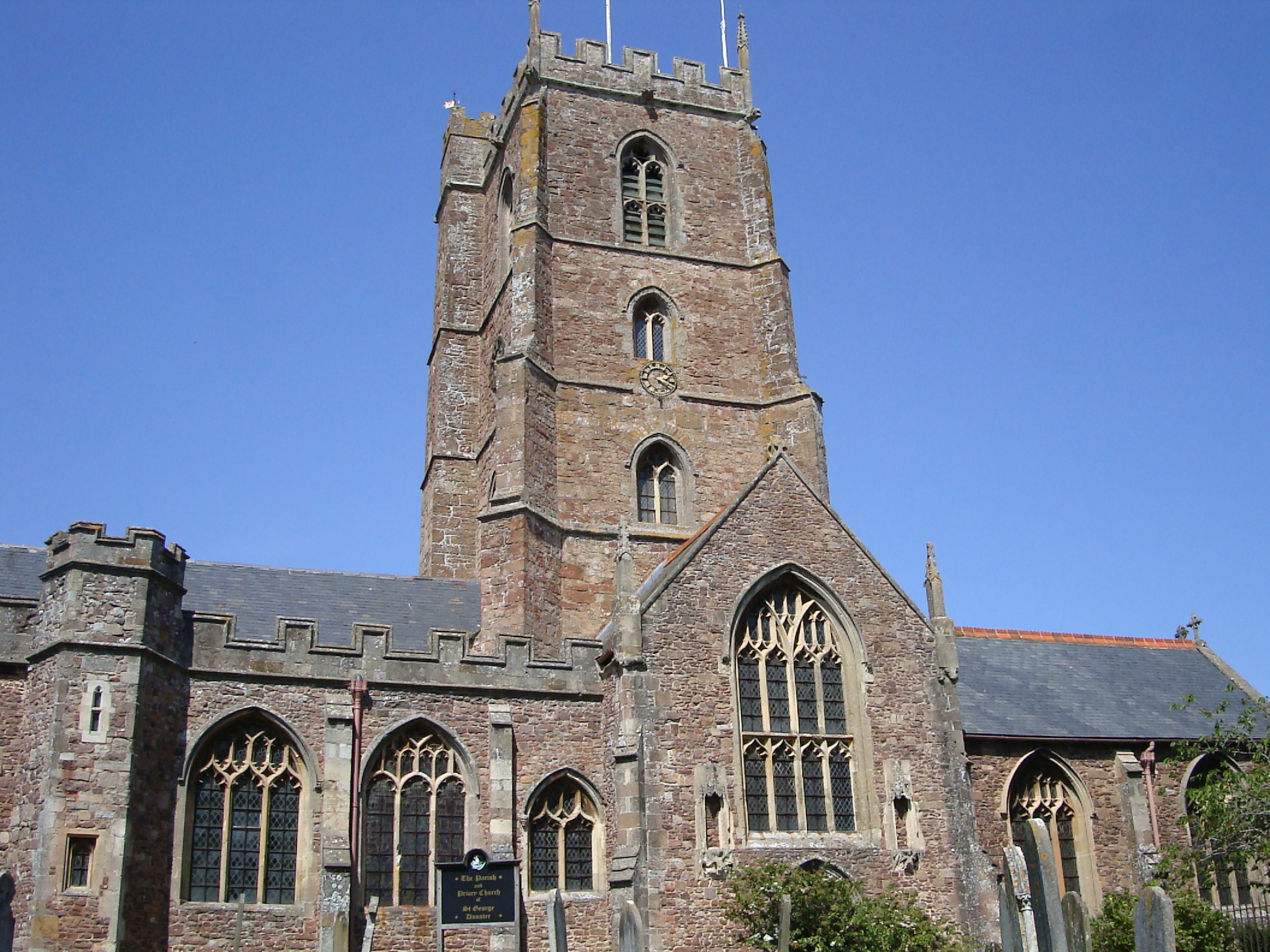
- Interactive map of Dunster Priory

Monastery information
- Order: Benedictine
- Established: c. 1100
- Disestablished: 1539

People
- Important associated figures: William de Mohun

Site
- Location: Dunster, Somerset, England
- Grid reference: SS989436

Dunster Priory shown within Somerset
(grid reference SS989436)

Dunster Priory was established as a Benedictine monastery around 1100 in Dunster, Somerset, England.

The first church in Dunster was built by William de Mohun who gave the church and the tithes of several manors and two fisheries, to the Benedictine Abbey at Bath. The priory, which was situated just north of the church, became a cell of the abbey. The church was shared for worship by the monks and the parishioners, however this led to several conflicts between them. One outcome was the carved rood screen which divided the church in two with the parish using the west chancel and the monks the east. The priory church is now in parochial use as the Priory Church of St George which still contains 12th and 13th century work, although most of the current building is from the 15th century. It has been designated as a Grade I listed building.

By 1291 the priory had income from lands and rents of £5 13s. 3d., and from churches and ecclesiastical dues of £13 7s. 4d. according to the taxatio of Pope Nicholas IV. In 1332 it became more separated from the Abbey at Bath and became a priory in its own right. In the "Valor Ecclesiasticus" of 1535 the net annual income of the Dunster Tithe Barn is recorded as being £37.4.8d (£37 23p), with £6.13s7d ( £6.68p ) being passed on to the priory in Bath.

The Dunster Dovecote, on Priory Green opposite the Tithe Barn, is approximately 19 feet (5.8 m) high and 19 feet (5.8 m) in diameter, with walls around 4 feet (1.2 m) thick. There are five hundred and forty nest-holes. It would originally have belonged to the priory. Domestic pigeons were kept to provide squabs, a luxury food from the breast meat of young pigeons. From the 12th century until 1619, only Lords of the Manor and parish priests were allowed to keep them.

The tithe barn itself, a grade II listed building, dates from the 14th century but has been much altered and only a limited amount of the original features survive. It has a cruciform plan. The east front has central double doors of heavy oak with a chamfered frame. The Somerset Buildings Preservation Trust (SBPT) has co-ordinated a £550,000 renovation project to turn it into a multi-purpose community hall under a 99-year lease at a pepper-corn rent, by the Crown Estate Commissioners who own the building.

In 1346 Cleeve Abbey built a nunnery in Dunster, but it was never inhabited by nuns and was used as a guest house. The former guest house of Dunster Priory, which was built in the 15th century, is now the Luttrell Arms Hotel.

The priory was dissolved as part of the dissolution of the monasteries in 1539.

== Burials (in the priory church) ==
- John de Mohun, 1st Baron Mohun (1269–1330)
- Sir Hugh Luttrell
- Elizabeth Courtenay, wife of Sir James Luttrell (and daughter of Philip Courtenay (died 1463))
- Thomas Luttrell (died 1571)
- George Luttrell
- Thomas Luttrell (1583–1644)
- Francis Luttrell (1628–1666)
- Francis Luttrell (1659–1690)
- Alexander Luttrell (1663–1711)
- Henry Fownes Luttrell (died 1780)
- John Fownes Luttrell (1752–1816)

== See also ==
- List of English abbeys, priories and friaries serving as parish churches
