= Dunster Museum & Doll Collection =

Doll museum in Somerset, England

Doll Museum
- Location within Somerset and the United Kingdom
- Established: 1971
- Location: Dunster, Somerset, England
- Coordinates: 51.18425237654007°N 3.444320709214622°W
- Type: Private (Charity)
- Curator: Christine Dore
- Website: https://www.dunstermuseum.co.uk/

The Dunster Museum & Doll Collection in Dunster, Somerset, England houses a collection of more than 800 dolls from around the world, based on the collection of the late Mollie Hardwick, who died in 1970 and donated her collection to the village memorial hall committee.

Established in 1971, the collection includes a display of British and foreign dolls in various costumes.

Thirty-two of the dolls were stolen during a burglary in 1992 and have never been recovered.
