= Rook Lane Chapel =

Building in Frome, Somerset, England

Coordinates: 51°13′47″N 2°19′21″W

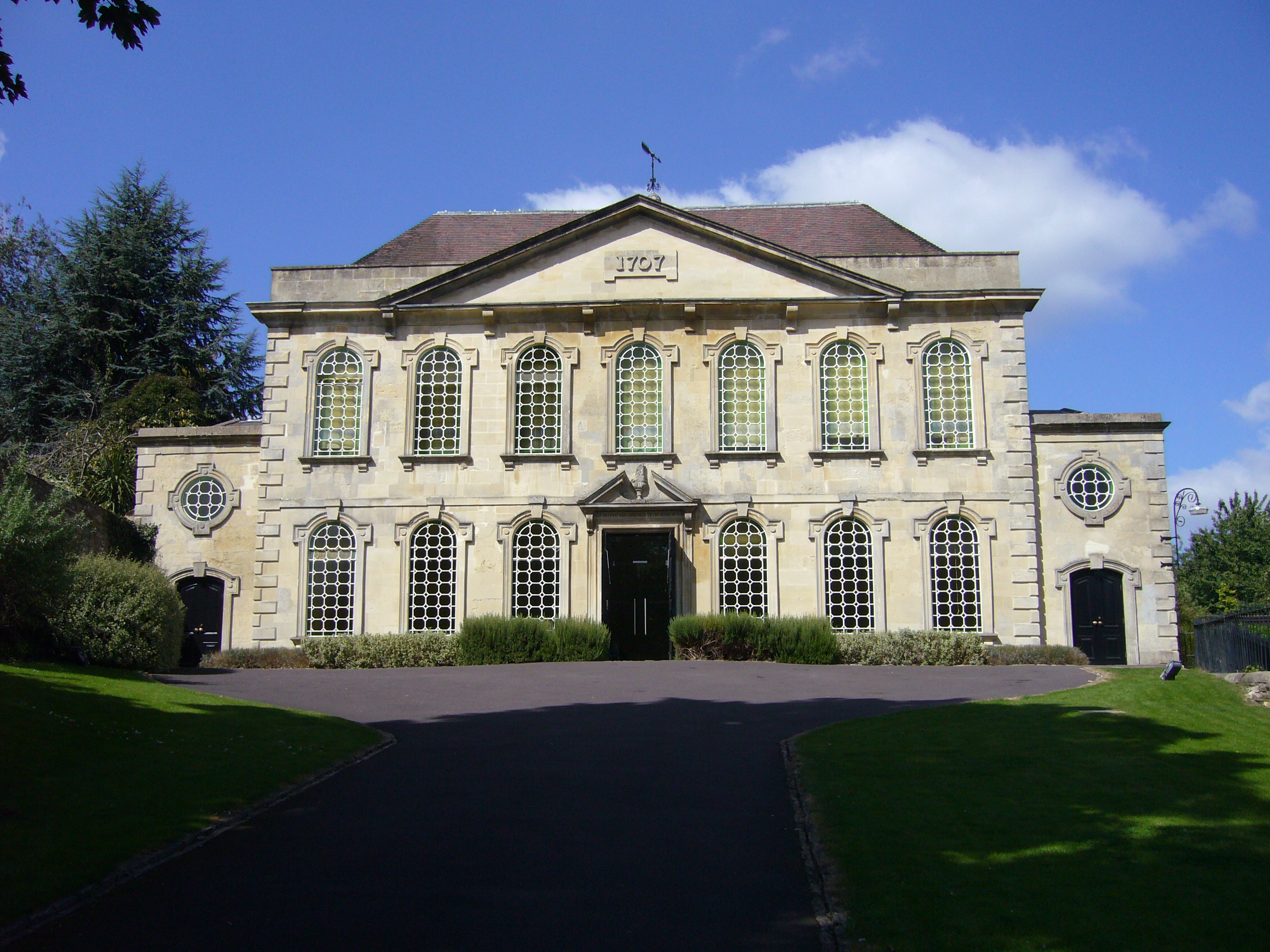
- Chapel front, following renovation
- Interactive map of the Rook Lane Chapel area

General information
- Location: Frome, Somerset, England
- Construction started: 1705
- Completed: 1707

Website
- rooklane.org.uk

Rook Lane Chapel was a place of worship, and is now an arts centre, in Frome, Somerset, England.

Built in 1707 by James Pope the chapel was the place of worship for nonconformists. In 1717 there were a thousand ‘hearers’ in the congregation. In 1773, a split in the congregation of Rook Lane led to the establishment of another Congregational Church, Zion, in Whittox Lane. As other chapels opened, however, there was a gradual decline in attendees and in 1933 the pastor's salary was reduced by £20 to £205 (equivalent to £10,000 in 2025). In 1965 the chapel merged with the Zion Chapel and Rook Lane eventually closed in 1968. It was sold to developers but they were unable to secure planning permission for proposed future uses. Lead and tiles were stolen from the roof, vandals broke in, smashed all the memorials and brought down the gallery.

The building was square with two pillars supporting the roof and a gallery around three sides. There are two tiers of seven windows, and a central pediment spanning five windows. Side lobbies were added in a matching style in 1862 for stairs to the gallery. Over the main door is an inscription from Ecclesiastes 5:1: "Keep thy foot when thou goest to the House of God". There is a domed roof structure which is still intact. It is said that this chapel was locally known as "The Cupola".

It was bought by the Somerset Buildings Preservation Trust which, with help from a grant from English Heritage, restored the Grade I listed building. The building is now owned by NVB, a firm of architects, who have converted it into a community facility for exhibitions, receptions, meetings and concerts, including chamber music. The galleried upper floor is used as office space by the architects. The building is also licensed for weddings.
