= Dunster Butter Cross =

Market cross in Dunster, Somerset, UK

Butter Cross
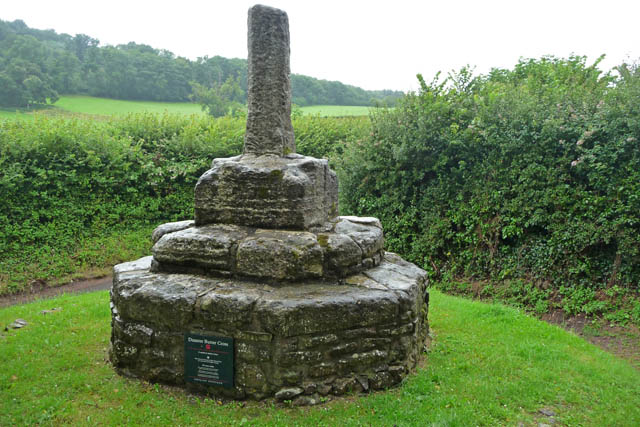

- Location within Somerset
- 51°11′6″N 3°26′57″W
- Location: Dunster, Somerset, England

History
- Built: 15th century

Listed Building – Grade II*
- Official name: Butter Cross
- Designated: 22 May 1969
- Reference no.: 1345602

Scheduled monument
- Official name: Butter Cross at Dunster
- Designated: 18 March 1996
- Reference no.: 1014409

The Butter Cross in Dunster within the English county of Somerset is a Grade II* listed building and scheduled monument. The cross was originally erected in the late 14th or early 15th century in the main street, and was moved to its current site in the late 18th or early 19th century. Although the head of the cross is missing, the shaft and socket stone are original. The cross is in the care of English Heritage and is managed by the National Trust.

== History ==
The name Buttercross originates from its location in market places, where people from neighbouring villages would gather around the market cross to buy locally produced products. The fresh produce was laid out and displayed on the stepped bases of the cross. The market in Dunster attracted people from surrounding villages and towns as far away as Taunton and Bodmin. The Dunster Butter Cross was erected in the late 14th or early 15th century and originally stood on the High Street, possibly at the southern end of the high street, near the Yarn Market. A cross, which was later known as the high cross, was recorded in 1461; by 1689 it was known as the Butter Cross.

It was moved to its current location on St George's Street at the edge of the village, although the date when this was done is unclear. The site where the cross now stands was levelled in 1776 by workmen, paid by Henry Fownes Luttrell, and it may have been on this occasion that the cross was moved. An alternative local tradition is that it was moved in 1825, although a drawing by J. M. W. Turner made in 1811 suggests it was in its present position by then.

The cross is in the care of English Heritage and is managed by the National Trust.

== Architecture ==
The cross comprises a shaft with a plinth and socket stone forming the base. The octagonal base and polygonal shaft have survived, but the head of the cross has been lost. It stands on a small area of raised ground. The socket stone is 0.85 metres (2 ft 9 in) wide and 0.5 metres (1 ft 8 in) high. The surviving shaft is 1.1 metres (3 ft 7 in) high and changes from a square to octagonal as it rises. There is an inscription on the northern face which says "WC, 1871, WS" recording a restoration.

== See also ==
- List of National Trust properties in Somerset
- List of English Heritage properties in Somerset
- List of scheduled monuments in West Somerset
- Grade II* listed buildings in West Somerset
