= Conygar Tower =

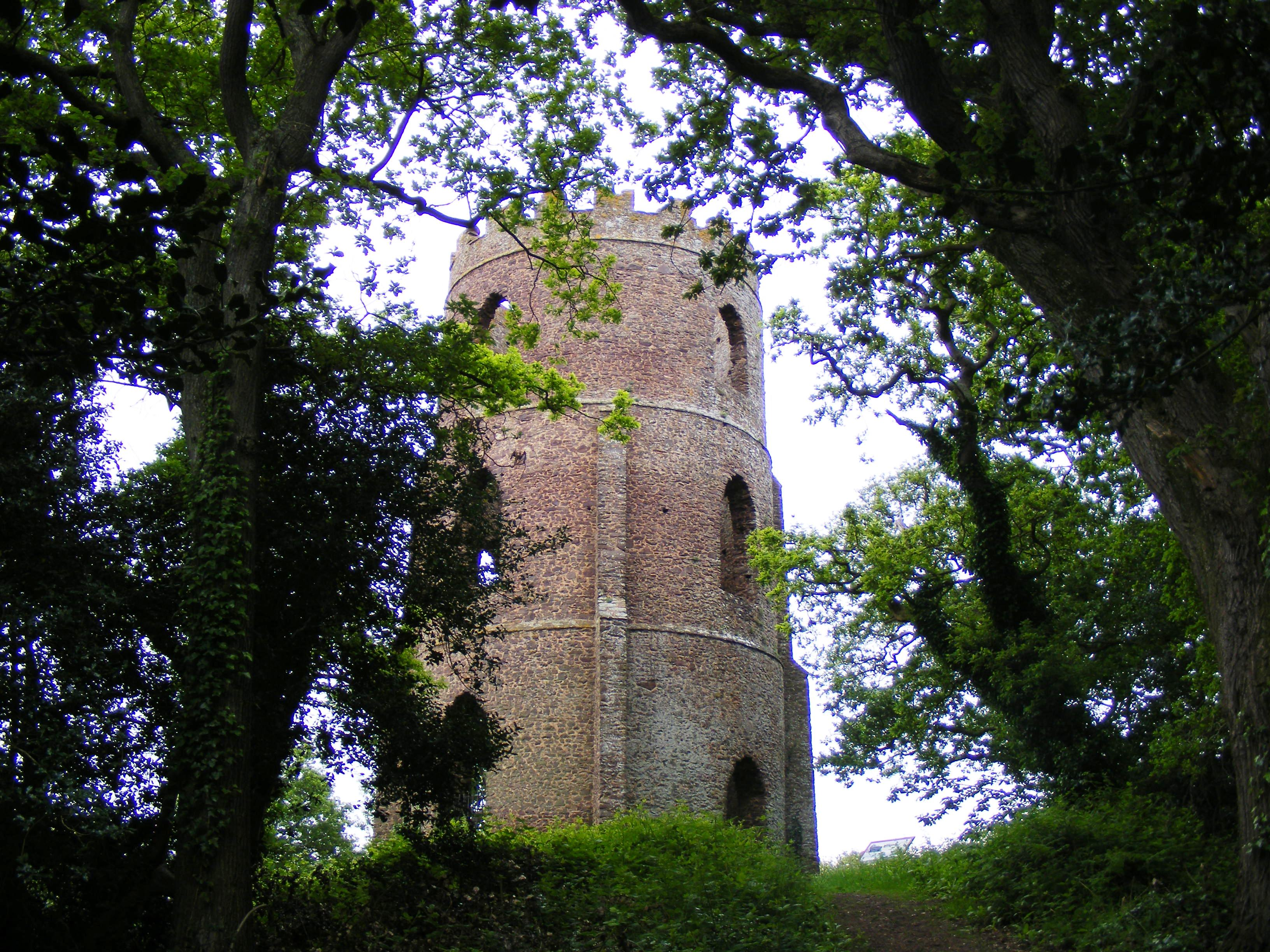
- Conygar Tower, Dunster

- Location within Somerset
- 51°11′14″N 3°26′38″W
- Location: Dunster, Somerset, England

History
- Built: 1775

Listed Building – Grade II
- Official name: Conygar Tower
- Designated: 22 May 1969
- Reference no.: 1057596

The Conygar Tower in Dunster, Somerset, England was built in 1775 and has been designated as a Grade II listed building.

It is a circular, 3 storey folly tower built of red sandstone, situated on a hill overlooking the village. It was commissioned by Henry Luttrell and designed by Richard Phelps and stands about 18 metres (59 ft) high so that it can be seen from Dunster Castle on the opposite hillside. There is no evidence that it ever had floors or a roof.

The name Conygar comes from two medieval words Coney meaning rabbit and Garth meaning garden, indicating that it was once a warren where rabbits were bred for food.

In 1997 a survey carried out by The Crown Estate identified cracks in the walls which were repaired in 2000.
