= Dunster Park and Heathlands =

- Site of Special Scientific Interest
- Location within Somerset
- Location of Dunster Park and Heathlands.
- Area of search: Somerset
- Grid reference: SS955441
- Coordinates: 51.18654°N 3.49663°W
- Interest: Biological
- Area: 466.6 hectares (4.666 km^{2}; 1.802 sq mi)
- Notification date: 2000

Dunster Park and Heathlands (grid reference SS955441) is a 466.6 hectare biological Site of Special Scientific Interest in Somerset, notified in 2000.

This site is located in the northeast of Exmoor National Park, within a few miles of the Bristol Channel near the village of Dunster. It is designated for its nationally important lowland dry heath, dry lowland acid grassland, wood-pasture with veteran trees and ancient semi-natural oak woodland habitats. The fauna of the lowland heath includes a nationally rare butterfly, the heath fritillary (Mellicta athalia). The assemblage of beetles associated with the veteran trees is of national significance.
