= Somerset Buildings Preservation Trust =

The Somerset Buildings Preservation Trust (SBPT) works to save the architectural heritage of Somerset, England.

The Trust is an independent body and consists of up to 18 Trustees who hold Board meetings 3 times a year. It is a Building Preservation Trust with charitable status and a company limited by guarantee. The Trust consists of up to 2 elected councillors nominated by the Somerset County Council and 5 elected councillors nominated by the District Councils in Somerset

== Projects ==
Since 1988 the SBPT has restored and converted a number of historic buildings:

- Tudor House, Langport
- Rook Lane Chapel, Frome
- The Temple of Harmony, Halswell Park Estate, Goathurst
- Robin Hood's Hut, Halswell Park Estate, Goathurst
- St Margaret's Almshouses, Taunton
- The Warehouse, Great Bow Yard, Langport
- The Tithe Barn, Dunster

== Future projects ==
The Trust has co-ordinated a £550,000 renovation project to turn the Tithe Barn at Dunster Priory into a community hall.

== See also ==
- Building Preservation Trust
- Bath Preservation Trust
- Society for the Protection of Ancient Buildings
- Wiltshire Historic Buildings Trust
