= Tudor House, Langport =

Tudor House
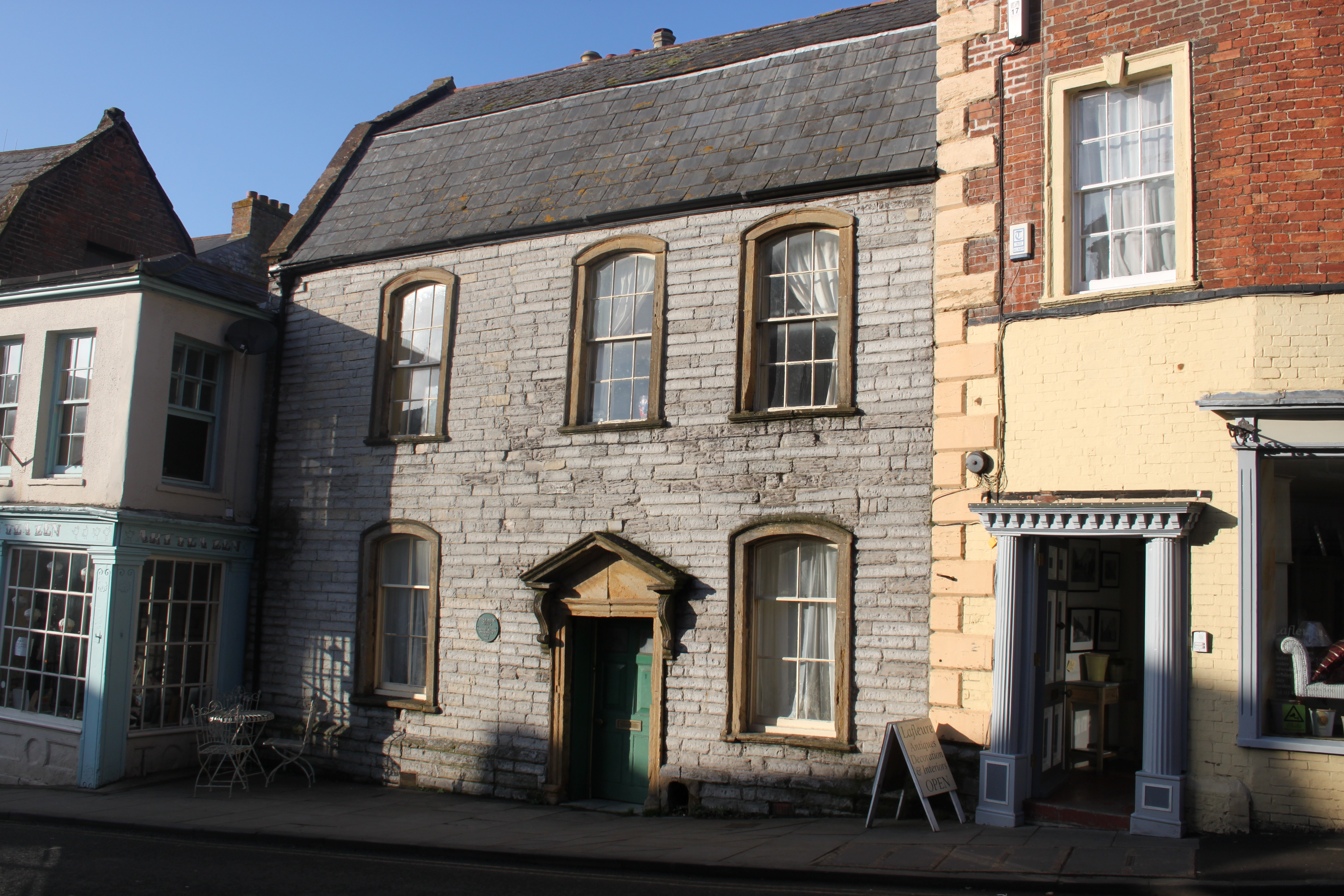
- Interactive map of the Tudor House area

General information
- Location: Langport, England
- Coordinates: 51°2′16″N 2°49′44″W
- Completed: 1776

The Tudor House is an 18th-century house in Langport, Somerset, England.

It was built in 1776 but had fallen into disrepair until it was bought and restored by the Somerset Buildings Preservation Trust in 1991 and is now a Grade II listed building.
