= Tithe Barn, Dunster =

Tithe barn in Dunster, Somerset, England

Coordinates: 51°11′3″N 3°26′46″W

Tithe Barn
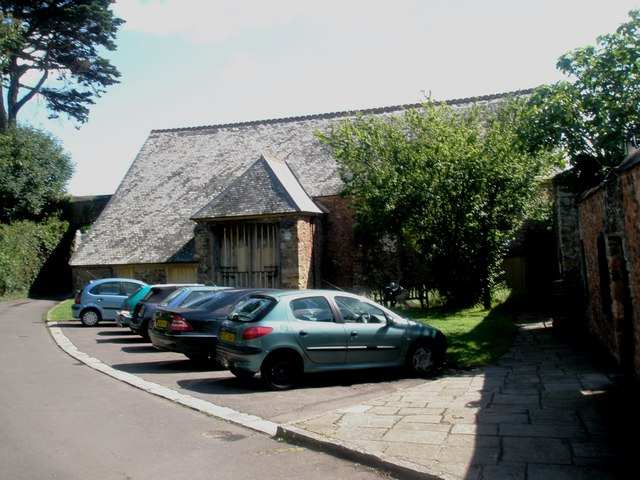
- Interactive map of the Tithe Barn area

General information
- Location: Dunster, England
- Completed: 14th century

The Tithe Barn is a 14th-century tithe barn in Dunster, Somerset, England.

It has a cruciform plan. The east front has central double doors in heavy oak with a chamfered frame. It is a grade II listed building.

The barn, which was originally part of a Benedictine Dunster Priory, has been much altered since the 14th century and only a limited amount of the original features survive. In the "Valor Ecclesiasticus" of 1535 the net annual income of the Dunster Tithe Barn is recorded as being £37.4.8d (£37 23p), with £6.13s7d ( £6.68p ) being passed on to the priory in Bath.

The Somerset Buildings Preservation Trust (SBPT) has co-ordinated a £550,000 renovation project on behalf of the Dunster Tithe Barn Community Hall Trust (DTBCHT), into a multi-purpose community hall under a 99-year lease at a pepper-corn rent, by the Crown Estate Commissioners who own the building. Funding has been obtained from the Heritage Lottery Fund and others to support the work.
