= George Luttrell =

English politician

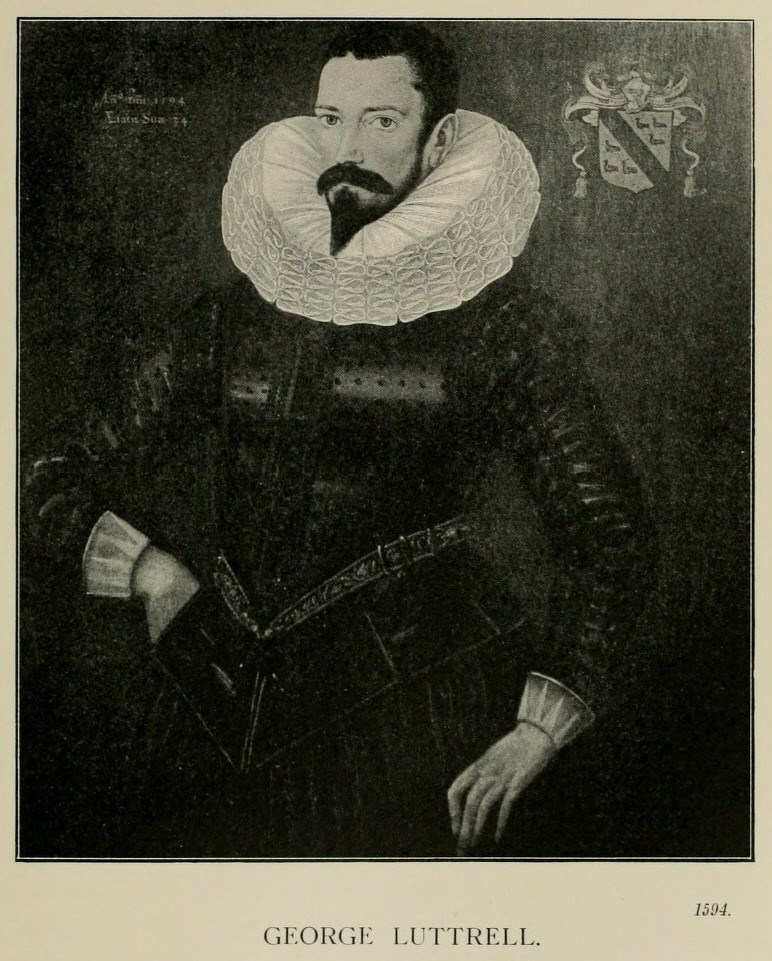
George Luttrell (1560-1629)

George Luttrell (12 Sep 1560 – Apr 1629) was an English politician from Dunster Castle in Somerset. In 1582 and 1584 he sat in the House of Commons of England as a Member of Parliament (MP) for his family's pocket borough of Minehead.

He was the oldest son of Thomas Luttrell of Dunster Castle. His mother, Margaret, was a daughter of Christopher Hadley of Withycombe. His younger brother was John Luttrell.

He married twice: Firstly, on 25 Sep 1580 to Joan Stukley, the younger daughter of his Ward, a "shady lawyer" named Hugh Stukley, of Marsh, Somerset. Secondly he married, at the age of 62, on 3 October 1622 a woman of relatively humble origins, named Sylvestra Capps, daughter of James Capps of Wiveliscombe, Devon; she outlived him by over 25 years and remarried twice. George Luttrell had a total of 5 sons and 9 daughters. His eldest son and heir by his first wife Joan was Thomas Luttrell (c. 1583 – 1644) q.v.

He was Sheriff of Somerset in 1593 and in 1609.

== Progeny ==
By his first wife, Joan Stukley, he had the following known children:

- Thomas Luttrell, heir to his father.
- Hugh Luttrell, of Rodhuish.
- George Luttrell, baptized at Dunster on 12 October 1590. He matriculated at Lincoln College, Oxford, in 1608, and afterwards became a student of Gray's Inn. He was buried at Dunster, on 30 December 1619.
- John Luttrell, baptized at Dunster on 5 January 1592. He matriculated at Lincoln College, Oxford, in 1608. He was living in 1620.
- Andrew Luttrell, baptized at Dunster on 6 June 1596 and was buried there four days later.
- Margaret Luttrell, baptized at East Quantockshead on 11 October 1584. She married at Dunster, on 3 August 1607, John Trevelyan of Nettlecombe.
- Catherine Luttrell, baptized at Dunster on 18 April 1589. She married there, on 4 August 1607, the morrow of her sister's wedding, Lewis Pyne of East Down, in Devonshire.
- Elizabeth Luttrell, baptized at Dunster on 23 March 1593, and buried there on 21 May 1595.
- Susan Luttrell, baptized at Dunster on 9 October 1594. She married there, on 29 June 1612, John Francis of Combe Florey.
- Elizabeth Luttrell, baptized at Dunster on 3 October 1598. In March 1621-2, George Luttrell, her father, made a formal declaration that he was willing that she should have the sum of 1,400L. bequeathed to her by her mother Joan, provided that she did not marry a Popish Recusant or the son of a Popish Recusant, or any other without his own consent. She nevertheless married, in that year, Thomas Arundel of Chideock in Dorset, a member of a noted Roman Catholic family.
- Sarah Luttrell, baptized at Dunster on 3 April 1600. She married at Dunster, on 9 February 1625, Edmund Bowyer of Beer near Cannington. She was buried at Stockland, on 17 May 1664.
- Mary Luttrell, buried at Dunster on 14 March 1608.

== See also ==
- Feudal barony of Dunster

Parliament of England
Preceded by Andrew Hemmerford; Richard Cabell	Member of Parliament for Minehead; 1582–1585; With: Richard Cabell 1582; Edward Rogers 1584–85	Succeeded by John Luttrell; Robert Crosse
