= Luttrell Arms =

The Luttrell Arms Hotel
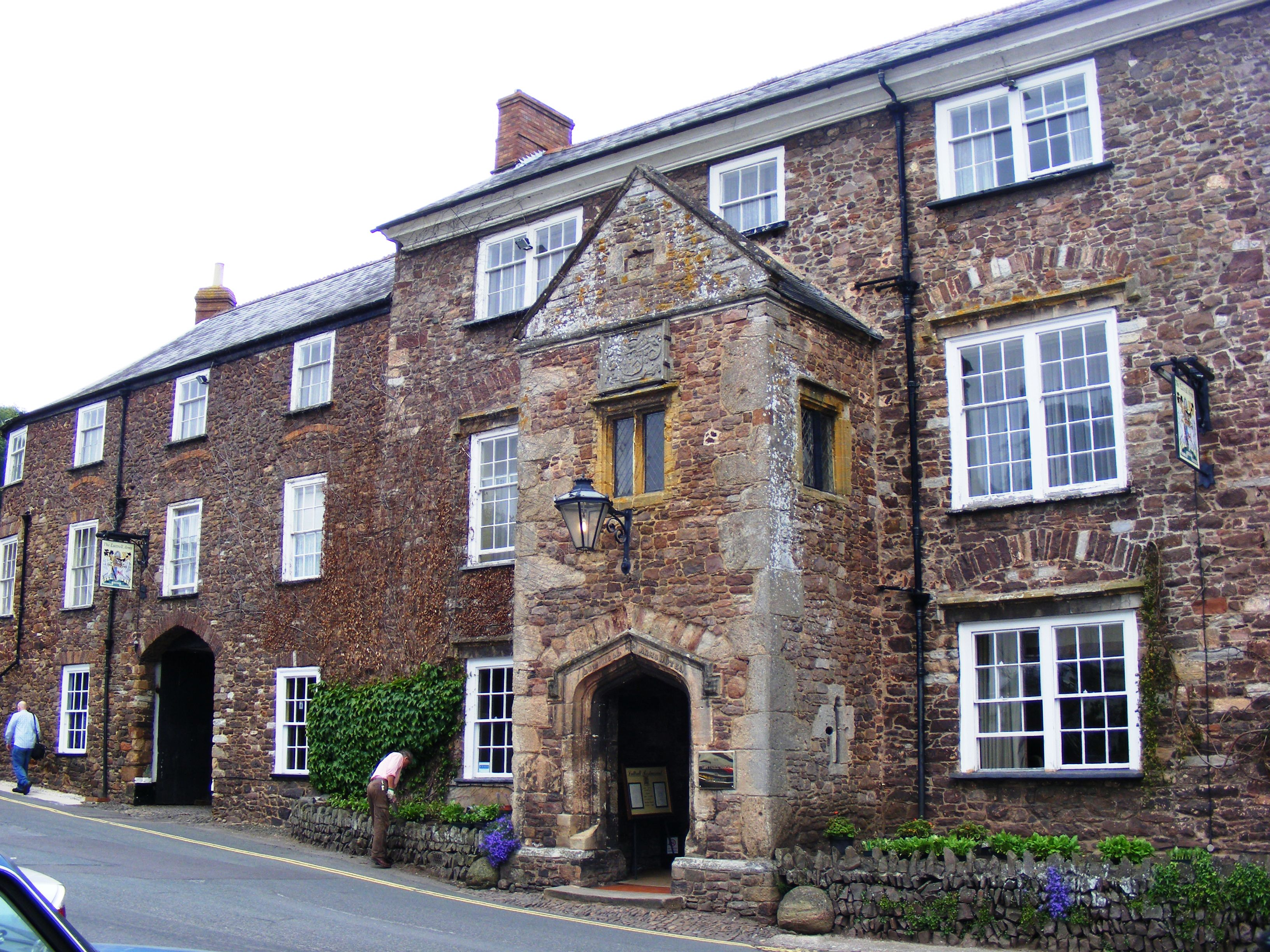
- The Luttrell Arms Hotel, Dunster

- Location within Somerset
- 51°11′04″N 3°26′39″W
- Location: Dunster, Somerset, England

History
- Built: 15th century

Listed Building – Grade II*
- Official name: The Luttrell Arms Hotel
- Designated: May 22, 1969
- Reference no.: 1057611

The Luttrell Arms in Dunster, Somerset, England was built in the late 15th century and is located in the centre of the medieval town of Dunster. The building has been designated as a Grade II* listed building since 22 May 1969. The original building has been enlarged over the years by addition of further wings. It is now used as a hotel.

== History ==
The Luttrell Arms occupies the site of three ancient houses recorded from 1443, when two of them were conveyed to Richard Luttrell by William Dodesham. There is no indication as to the age of these houses at the time, or what part, if any, they take in the building we see today. The building was formerly a guest house for the Abbots of Cleeve Abbey.

== Architecture ==
The Luttrell Arms is a Grade II* listed building and was constructed in the late fifteenth to early sixteenth centuries, with some later additions and alterations. It is built of rubble stone with a slate roof. The original part of the house consists of three storeys, while the porch, at the centre of the front, is two storeys high. Wings of lower height were added to left and right at later dates, and a wing at the rear of the main part once served as the hall. The main doorway has a carved stone heraldic emblem above the outer door opening, moulded stone copings and a saddle stone at the gable. The windows on the main wings are sash windows with glazing bars, mostly single width, but double width to the right and left of the porch. The leaded casement-type windows on the porch have moulded stone mullions. The interior features include a four-centred stone door frame, an oak door frame, an open fireplace, large moulded oak ceiling beams and exposed rafters. A ground floor room has a seventeenth century plaster ceiling and an upper floor room has an open roof of timber with moulded arch braces and purlins.

== Luttrell Arms Hotel ==
The building is now a hotel with twenty-eight bedrooms. In 2016 it was awarded Inn of the Year by The Good Pub Guide, which mentioned the "thoughtfully furnished bedrooms", some of which have four-poster beds, and "stunning architectural features".
