= Priory Church of St George, Dunster =

Church in Somerset, England

Priory Church of St George
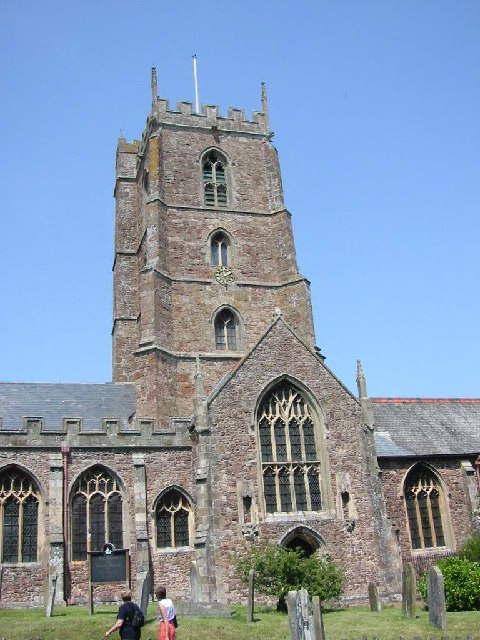

- Location within Somerset

General information
- Location: Dunster, England
- Coordinates: 51.1832°N 3.4459°W
- Completed: 15th century

Bells ringing at St George's Church, Dunster

The Priory Church of St George in Dunster, Somerset, England, is predominantly 15th-century with evidence of 12th- and 13th-century work. It has been designated as a Grade I listed building.

== History ==
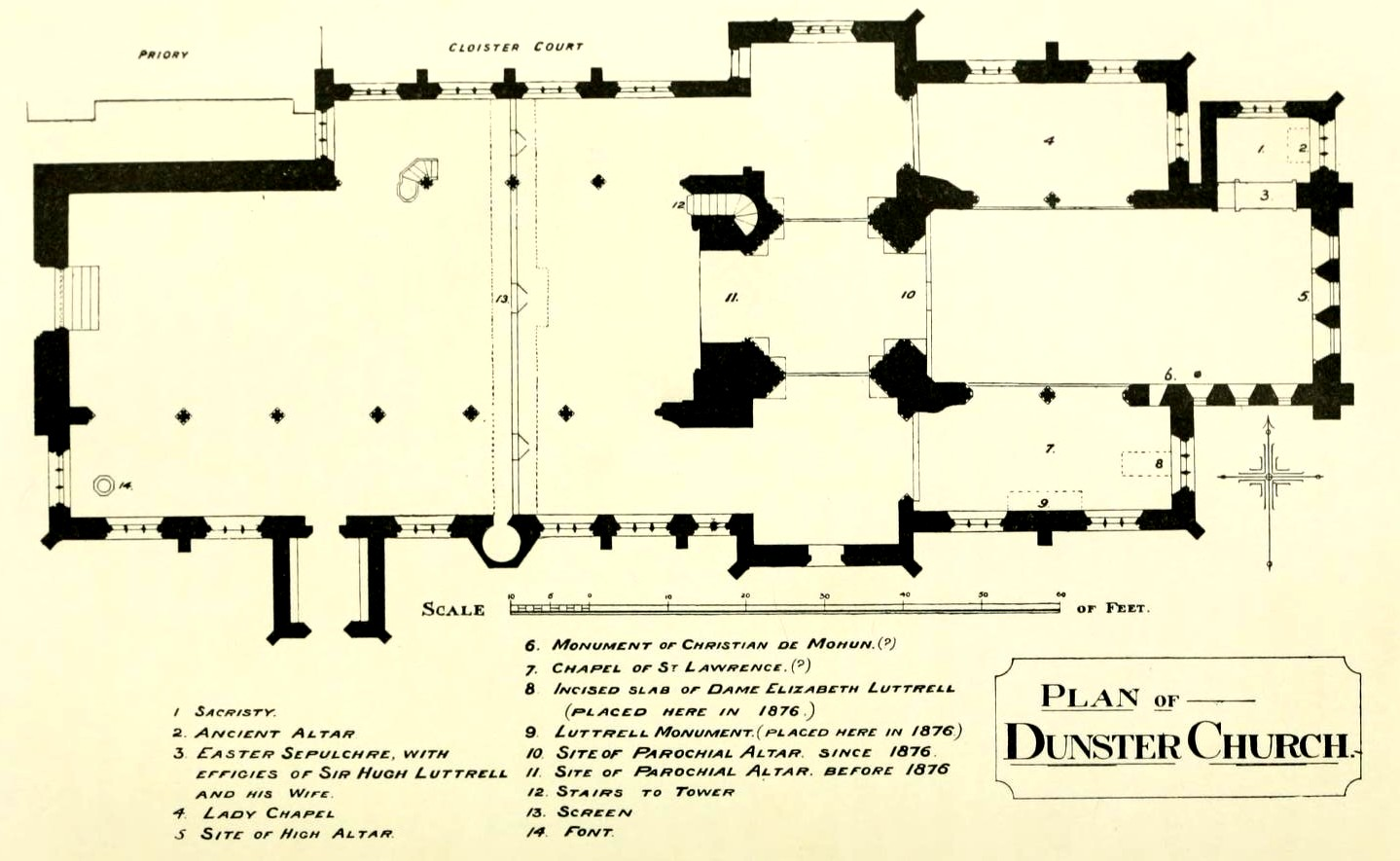
Plan of the church

The church was started by William de Moyon during the 11th century.

The tower was built by Jon Marys of Stogursey who received a contract from the parish in 1442. He was paid 13s 4d for each foot in height and £1 for the pinnacles. The work was completed in three years. Aisles were added in 1504.

The church was shared for worship between the monks of Dunster Priory and the parishioners, however this led to several conflicts between them. One outcome was the carved rood screen which divided the church in two with the parish using the west chancel and the monks the east.

It was restored in 1875–77 by George Edmund Street. The church has a cruciform plan with a central four-stage tower, built in 1443 with diagonal buttresses, a stair turret and single bell-chamber windows.

== See also ==
- Grade I listed buildings in West Somerset
- List of Somerset towers
- List of ecclesiastical parishes in the Diocese of Bath and Wells
