= William de Moyon =

11th-century Anglo-Norman landowner

William I de Moyon (d. post 1090) (alias de Moion, also de Mohun), 1st feudal baron of Dunster in Somerset, was seigneur of Moyon in Normandy and became Sheriff of Somerset in 1086. He founded the English de Mohun family in the West Country. Recorded in the Domesday Book of 1086 as a tenant-in-chief of William the Conqueror holding a number of manors in Somerset with caput at Dunster Castle.

== Career ==
Deriving from Moyon, near Saint-Lô, Normandy, William was called "one of the greatest Barons of the Cotentin" by Francis Palgrave, though he adds that William had only "five knights who held of him". Dugdale attributed "forty-seven stout Knights of name and note" to him. Participating in the Norman conquest of England, he was granted fifty-five manors in Somerset, one each in Wiltshire and Dorset. He built Dunster Castle on the site of a former West Saxon fortress. The Norman chronicler Wace called him le Viel, (modern French: le Vieux), "the elder", to distinguish him from his son William II de Mohun (d. circa 1155).

He acquired sixty-eight manors in the west of England, one each in Devon, Wiltshire, eleven in Dorset, one of them Ham, which was inherited by his descendants, it was called Ham-Mohun, or Hammoon, and fifty-five in Somerset.

The estate connected to his caput at Dunster consisted of the ancient hundreds of Cutcombe and Minehead, land in Minehead, Cutcombe, and Dunster and some additions making a total of 19,726 acres.

He bred horses both at Cutcombe and at Nunney, near Frome, sub-infeudated (through one of his tenants), where unbroken brood-mares were kept.

He was Sheriff of Somerset from 1083 to 1086; his manor of Brompton-Ralph was called in contemporary records Brunetone Vicecomitis ("Brompton of the Viscount", i.e. Sheriff).

=== Dunster Priory ===
William de Moion is credited with founding Dunster Priory. Between 1090 and 1100 he granted the Church of St. George at Dunster (where part of the Norman building survives), land and tithes and a tenth of his mares, to the Abbey of St. Peter at Bath and to Bishop John de Villula (died 1122), to "build and exalt" the church. Bath Abbey established at Dunster a cell of their own abbey under the rule of a prior. One of William's charters is recorded in a manuscript at Corpus Christi College, Cambridge. In this charter William declared his wish to be buried in Bath Abbey, not at Dunster.

== Landholdings ==
The manors he held included Minehead, West Quantoxhead and Combe Sydenham.

== Marriage and children ==
He married Adelisa, who bore him three sons, all surviving at the date of his grant to Bath Abbey:

- William II de Mohun, 1st Earl of Somerset (d. circa 1155), eldest son and heir was made a life peer Earl of Somerset in 1141.
- Geoffrey de Mohun;
- Robert de Mohun.
