= William de Mohun, Earl of Somerset =

English noble (c. 1090 – c. 1155)

1st Earl of Somerset
- Tenure: 1141 – c. 1155
- Born: c. 1090
- Died: c. 1155
- Noble family: de Mohun
- Spouse: Agnes de Gaunt
- Father: William de Moyon

William de Mohun of Dunster, Earl of Somerset (c. 1090 – c. 1155), second feudal baron of Dunster, was a favourite of Empress Matilda and a loyal supporter of her in the war against King Stephen, during which he earned the epithet of the "Scourge of the West".

== Life ==
William was the son of William de Moion, who was seigneur of Moyon, which is close to Saint-Lô. The elder William was Sheriff of Somerset in 1084.

During the war between Matilda and Stephen, Stephen marched against William's castle at Dunster, but finding it too hard to take, he left Henry de Tracy to keep Mohun under siege.

Matilda conferred upon him the title Earl of Somerset, in 1141. In the foundation charter of the priory at Bruton, he describes himself as "Willielmus de Moyne, comes Somersetensis". Unlike Baldwin de Redvers, who was created Earl of Devon by Matilda at around the same time, William's title was not recognised by Stephen or Henry II, Matilda's son, and his descendants did not use the title.

== Family ==
William married Agnes de Gaunt, daughter of Walter de Gaunt and Maud of Brittany, daughter of Stephen, Count of Tréguier, 3rd Lord of Richmond (born btw. 1058/62 – died 21 April 1136), (he is sometimes misidentified as "Stephen, Count of Brittany").

== Sources ==
- Cokayne, G. E., The Complete Peerage. (London: St. Catherine Press, 1953) ed. Geoffrey F. White. Vol. XII, Part 1, pp. 36–38.
- Hunt, William (1894). "Mohun, William de (fl.1141)" . In Lee, Sidney (ed.). Dictionary of National Biography. Vol. 38. London: Smith, Elder & Co.
- Lyte, Henry Churchill Maxwell (1909). A history of Dunster and of the families of Mohun & Luttrell. St. Catherine Press. OCLC 679874960.
- Weis, Frederick Lewis, Ancestral Roots of Certain American Colonists Who Came to America Before 1700 Line 143–24
