= The Women of Amphissa =

Painting by Lawrence Alma-Tadema

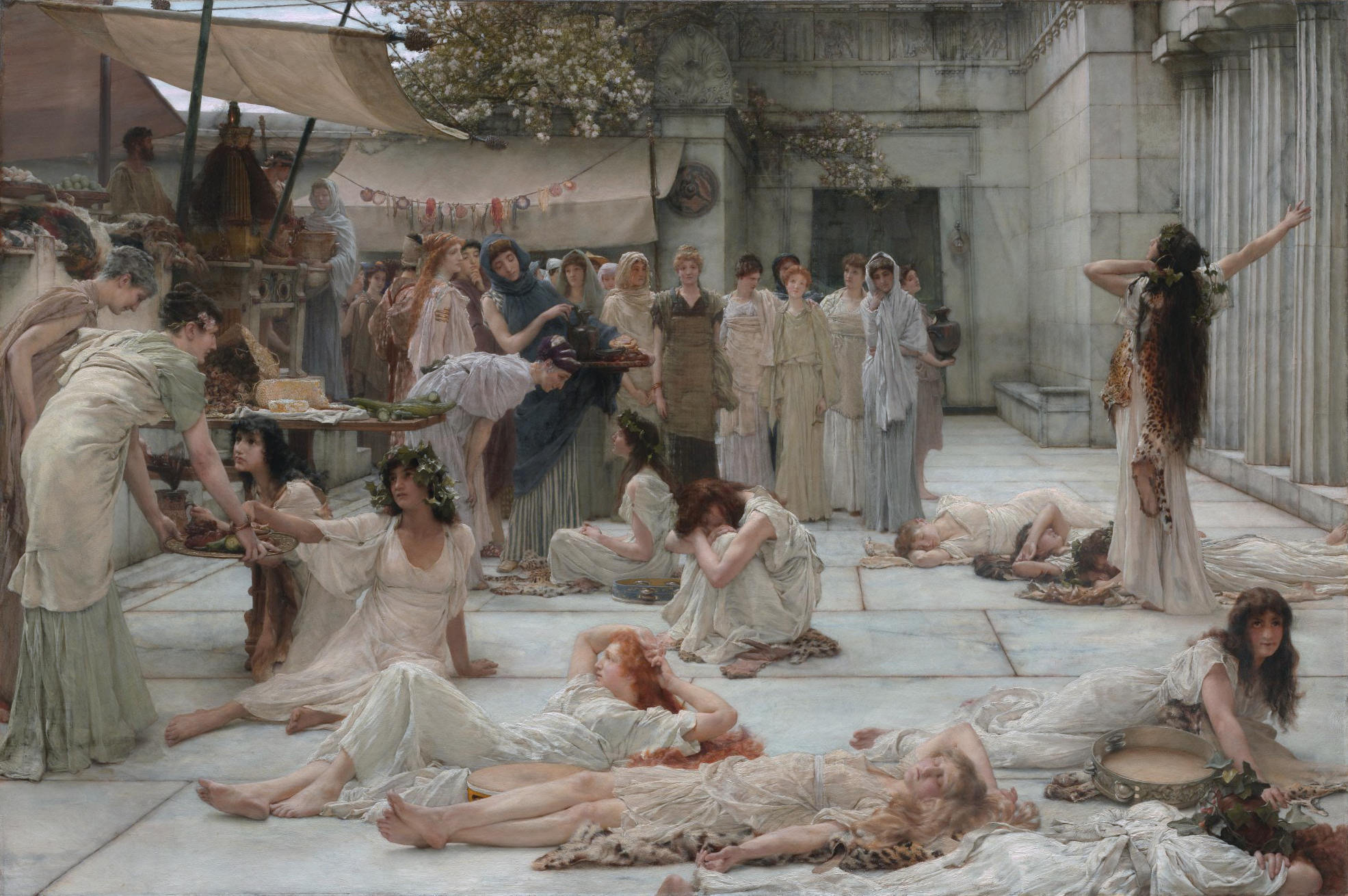
- Artist: Lawrence Alma-Tadema
- Year: 1887
- Medium: oil on canvas
- Dimensions: 121 cm × 182 cm (48 in × 72 in)
- Location: Clark Art Institute, Williamstown

The Women of Amphissa is an oil on canvas painting by Sir Lawrence Alma-Tadema, made in 1887. It is held at the Clark Art Institute, in Williamstown. It depicts a group of maenads waking up in the market of Amphissa, after a night of debauchery.

== History ==
The maenads were, in Ancient Greece, women who took part in the cult of Dionysus. They reached ecstasy and trance by screaming and dancing. They used many Dionysian attributes such as the nebris or the thyrsus, and took drugs chewing ivy leaves.

Alma-Tadema accurately recreates on his canvas the events recounted by Plutarch, in his book Moralia: "At the time when usurpers from Phocis seized the sanctuary of Delphi and the Thebans declared the so-called sacred war on them, the women in the service of Dionysus, who are called the maenads, in a trance and wandering at night, did not notice that they were in the territory of Amphissa. Exhausted and without having yet regained their senses, they fell down on the market and felt asleep scattered where they had fallen. The women of Amphissa, seeing that the Phocians were in the camp of the allies and seeing the presence of many soldiers of the usurpers, fearing that the maeneds would be violated, all ran to the market, surrounded the sleeping women silently without questioning them, rendered them all the care possible and brought them food. They finally persuaded their husbands to let them take them back to the frontier, escorting them for their safety."

== Description ==
The painting shows the maeneds upon waking, lying on the ground, with their hair disheveled and barefoot. Some are still asleep while others stretch nonchalantly. The ground is strewn with their clothes, animal skins and tambourines. Their sleepy and unkempt postures underline the night of debauchery they have just spent.

The attitude of the maeneds contrasts sharply with the women who have come for their shopping, who appear stiff, frozen and recall, by their gravity, the ancient Greek statues. The viewers can read on the faces of the many women discovering this scene of debauchery a myriad of different reactions. While some seem surprised by the presence of these women, others express their concern and interest. A few display curiosity, astonishment and even envy.

In the square where the scene takes place, the market is already set up with the many products it offers: oils, honey, eggs, meat, fish, among others Alma-Tadema offers the viewer the meeting of two exclusively female groups. Only one man appears in the painting: a merchant located in the shadows of his stall, at the left.

== Exhibition ==
Alma-Tadema received a medal at the Universal Exhibition in Paris, in 1889, for this painting, which reveals his virtuosity.
