= A Roman Flower Market =

Painting by Lawrence Alma–Tadema

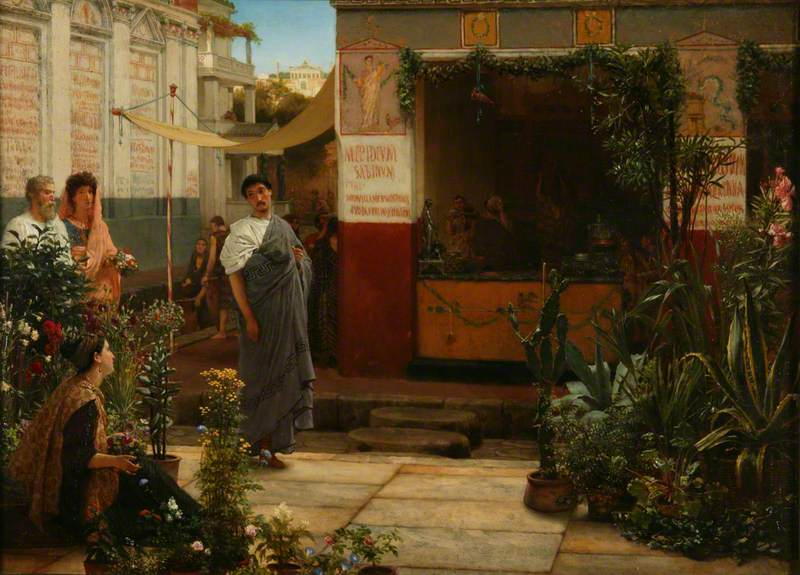
- Artist: Lawrence Alma-Tadema
- Year: 1868
- Type: Oil on panel, history painting
- Dimensions: 42 cm × 58 cm (17 in × 23 in)
- Location: Manchester Art Gallery; Greater Manchester

A Roman Flower Market is an 1868 historical genre painting by the Dutch artist Lawrence Alma-Tadema. It depicts a marketplace, a common theme in Dutch Golden Age genre painting, which Alma-Tadema gives a twist by shifting the setting to the Ancient Roman settlement of Pompeii.

Alma-Tadema settled in Britain where he became a prominent member of the Royal Academy of Arts. He was known for the many depictions of scenes in Ancient Rome he produced. The painting was exhibited in Britain until after the artist's death in 1912. Today it is in the Manchester Art Gallery, having been acquired in 1934.

== Bibliography ==
- Barrow, Rosemary J. Lawrence Alma-Tadema. Phaidon Press, 2001.
- Liversidge, Michael & Edwards, Catherine. Imagining Rome British Artists and Rome in the Nineteenth Century. Merrell Holberton, 1996.
