= Unconscious Rivals =

Painting by Lawrence Alma–Tadema

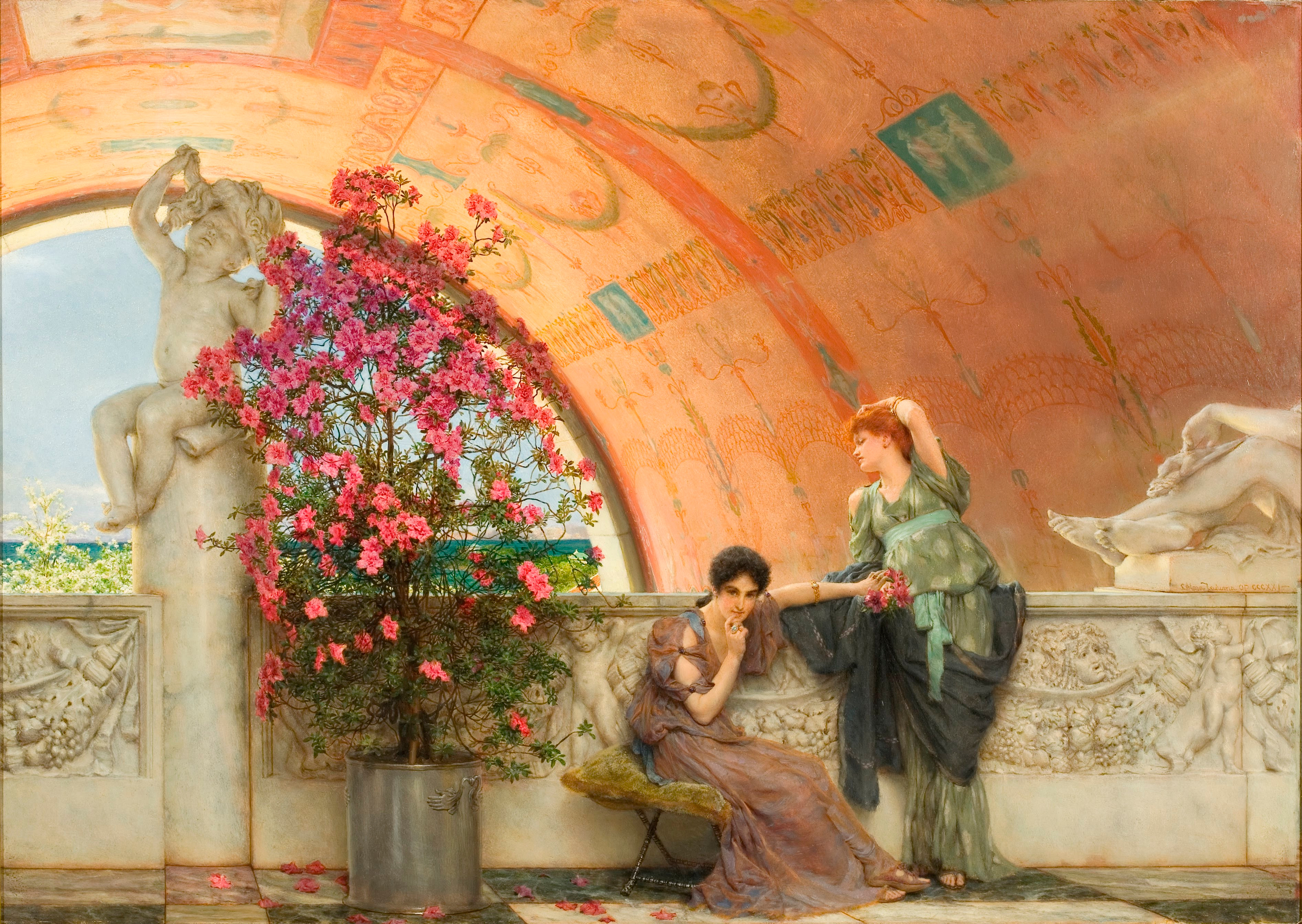
- Artist: Lawrence Alma-Tadema
- Year: 1893
- Type: Oil on panel, history painting
- Dimensions: 45 cm × 296.3 cm (18 in × 116.7 in)
- Location: City Museum and Art Gallery; Bristol

Unconscious Rivals is an oil painting by the Dutch artist Lawrence Alma-Tadema, from 1893. The artist settled in Britain and became a member of the Royal Academy. Like a number of his works it is set in Ancient Rome. Two attractive women wait in the luxurious setting of a Villa, presumably for a man who they are both unconscious rivals for.

The work was displayed at the Royal Academy's Summer Exhibition of 1893 at Burlington House in London. Today the painting is in the collection of the City Museum and Art Gallery in Bristol, having been acquired in 1935.

== Bibliography ==
- Moser, Stephanie. Painting Antiquity: Ancient Egypt in the Art of Lawrence Alma-Tadema, Edward Poynter and Edwin Long. Oxford University Press, 2020.
