= Lawrence Alma-Tadema =

Dutch-born British painter (1836–1912)

Sir Lawrence Alma-Tadema OM RA RWS
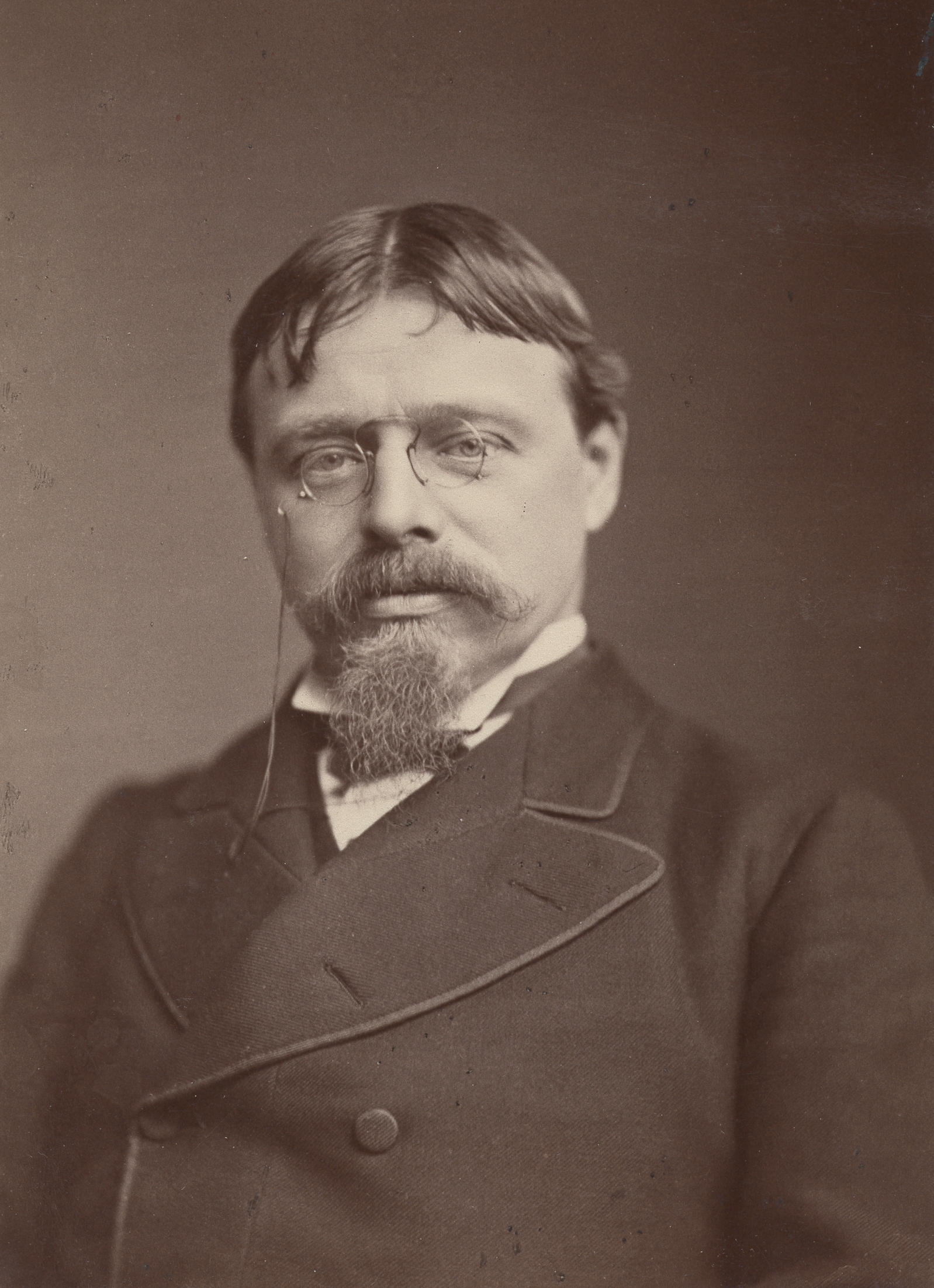
- Alma-Tadema in 1870
- Born: Lourens Alma Tadema; 8 January 1836; Dronryp, Waadhoeke, Netherlands
- Died: 25 June 1912 (aged 76); Wiesbaden, German Empire
- Known for: Painting
- Movement: Academicism
- Spouses: Marie-Pauline Gressin-Dumoulin de Boisgirard (m. 1863; died 1869); Laura Theresa Epps (m. 1871; died 1909)
- Children: Laurence Alma-Tadema; Anna Alma-Tadema
- Awards: Order of Merit; Royal Academician; Member of the Royal Watercolour Society

Sir Lawrence Alma-Tadema (/ˈælmə ˈtædeɪmə/ AL-mə TAD-ay-mə; born Lourens Alma Tadema, Dutch: [ˈlʌurəns ˈɑlmaː ˈtaːdəmaː]; 8 January 1836 – 25 June 1912) was a Dutch painter who later settled in the United Kingdom, becoming the last officially recognised denizen in 1873. Born in Dronryp, the Netherlands (Fryslân), and trained at the Royal Academy of Antwerp, Belgium, he settled in London, England in 1870 and spent the rest of his life there.

A painter of mostly classical subjects, he became famous for his depictions of the luxury and decadence of the Roman Empire, with languorous figures set in fabulous marbled interiors or against a backdrop of dazzling blue Mediterranean sea and sky. One of the most popular Victorian painters, Alma-Tadema was admired during his lifetime for his draftsmanship and accurate depictions of classical antiquity, but his work fell out of fashion after his death, and only since the 1960s has it been appreciated for its importance within Victorian painting.

== Biography ==
=== Early life ===
Alma-Tadema was born on 8 January 1836 in the village of Dronryp in the province of Friesland in the north of the Netherlands. The surname Tadema is an old Frisian patronymic, meaning 'son of Tade', while the names Lourens and Alma came from his godfather. He was the sixth child of Pieter Jiltes Tadema (1797–1840), the village notary, and the third child of Hinke Dirks Brouwer (1800–1863). His father had three sons from a previous marriage. His parents' first child died young, and the second was Artje (1834–1876), Lourens' sister, for whom he had great affection.

The Tadema family moved in 1838 to the nearby city of Leeuwarden, where Pieter's position as a notary would be more lucrative. His father died when Lourens was four, leaving his mother with five children: Lourens, his sister, and three boys from his father's first marriage. His mother had artistic leanings and decided that drawing lessons should be incorporated into the children's education. He received his first art training with a local drawing master hired to teach his older half-brothers.

It was intended that the boy would become a lawyer; but in 1851 at the age of fifteen he suffered a physical and mental breakdown. Diagnosed as consumptive and given only a short time to live, he was allowed to spend his remaining days at his leisure, drawing and painting. Left to his own devices, he regained his health and decided to pursue a career as an artist.

=== Move to Belgium ===
In 1852, he entered the Royal Academy of Antwerp in Belgium where he studied early Dutch and Flemish art, under Gustaf Wappers. During Alma-Tadema's four years as a registered student at the academy, he won several awards. Before leaving the academy, towards the end of 1855, he became assistant to the painter and professor Louis (Lodewijk) Jan de Taeye, whose courses in history and historical costume he had greatly enjoyed at the academy. Although de Taeye was not an outstanding painter, Alma-Tadema respected him and became his studio assistant, working with him for three years. De Taeye introduced him to books that influenced his desire to portray Merovingian subjects early in his career. He was encouraged to depict historical accuracy in his paintings, a trait for which the artist became known.

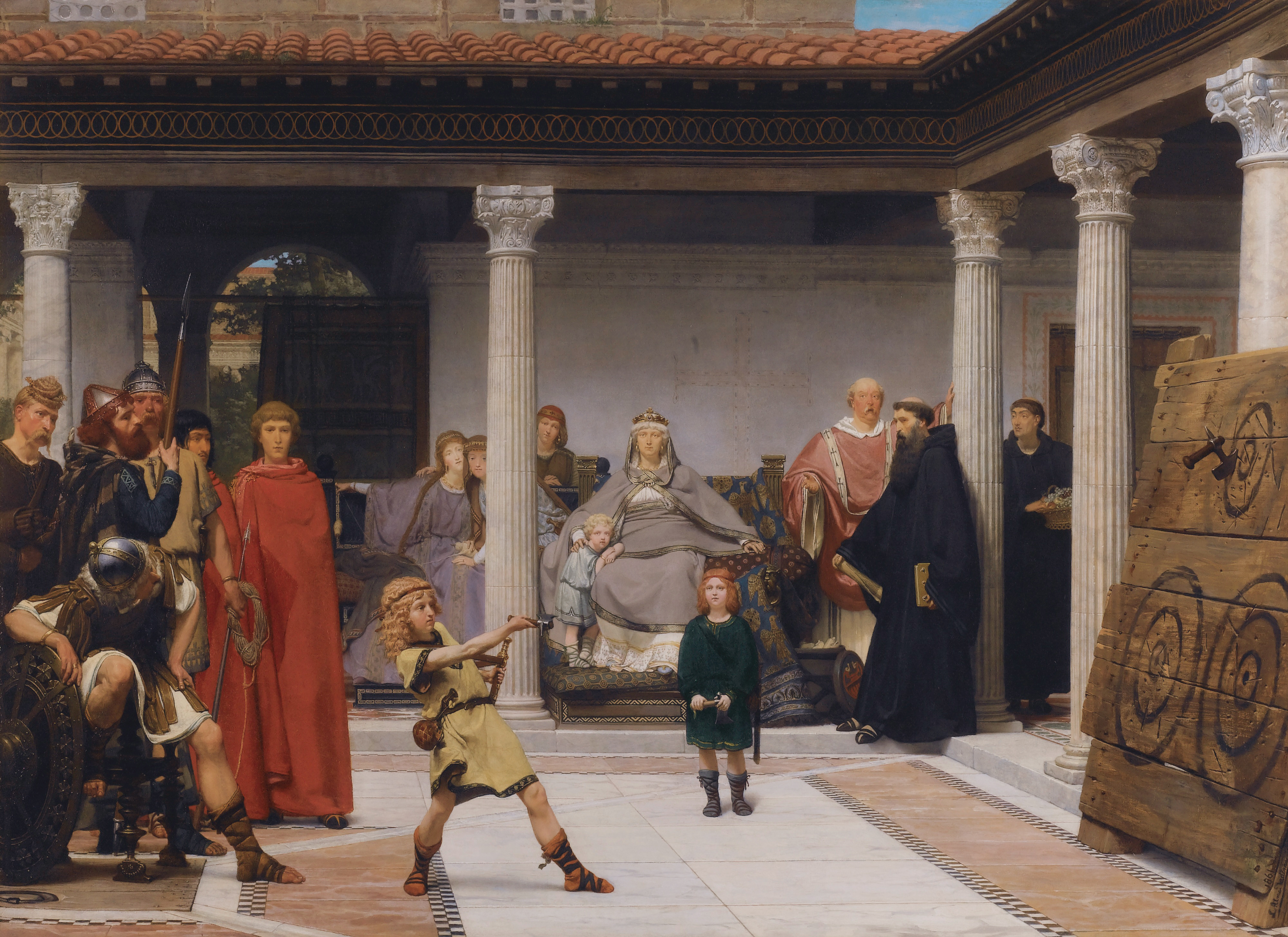
The Education of the Children of Clovis (1861), oil on canvas, 127 × 176.8 cm, private collection. Queen Clotilde, wife of King Clovis, is shown training her three young children the art of hurling the axe to avenge the death of her father.

De Taeye's greatest influence on his young pupil was his interest in ancient civilisations, particularly the Egyptians, first displayed in The Dying Cleopatra, begun in 1859 but later destroyed by the artist, and The Sad Father or The Unfavourable Oracle (Opus X), painted in 1858. Originally a large processional painting in an architectural setting, it was later cut down to a smaller scale to show only three figures; this reduced painting is now in the Johannesburg Art Gallery. Another section of The Sad Father was modified by the artist ten years later, in 1869, and exhibited at the Royal Academy in 1871 under the title The Grand Chamberlain to Sesostris the Great. Of the large original painting, Sir Edmund William Gosse will later say: "As the first of a series of Egyptian pictures, some of which are to be counted among the highest expressions of Alma-Tadema’s genius, The Unfavourable Oracle is a work of great interest".

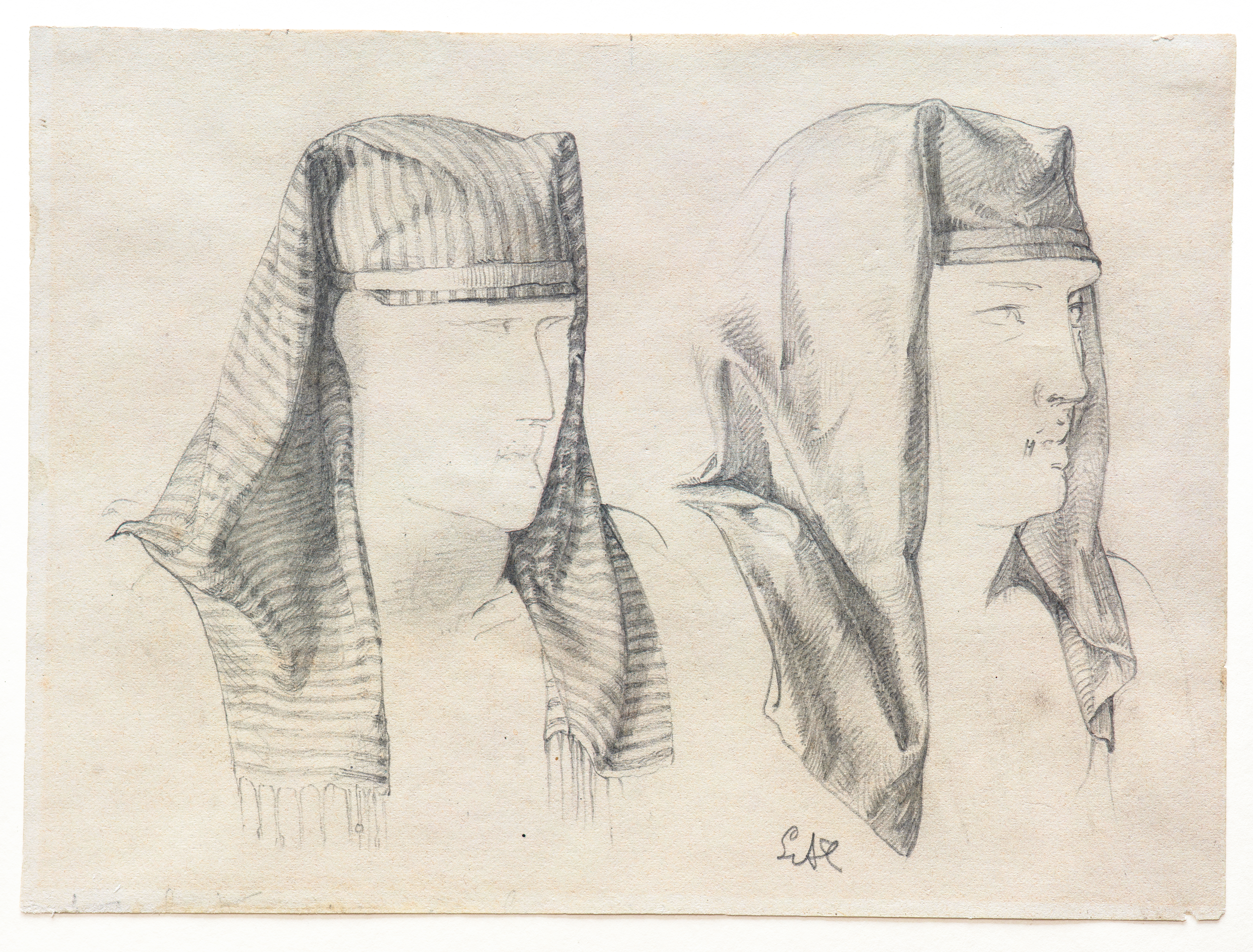
Preparatory studies for The Contrary Oracle, showing Alma-Tadema's early interest in ancient Egypt as well as his attention to detail and historical accuracy.

The artist planned two other Egyptian-themed paintings in the years 1857 and 1858, named Going to the Oracle and The Contrary Oracle, of which a number of preparatory drawings that were once in Gosse's possession survive to this day. These paintings were either never executed, or else destroyed, as during his student years Alma-Tadema frequently destroyed or painted over works that he was unhappy with.

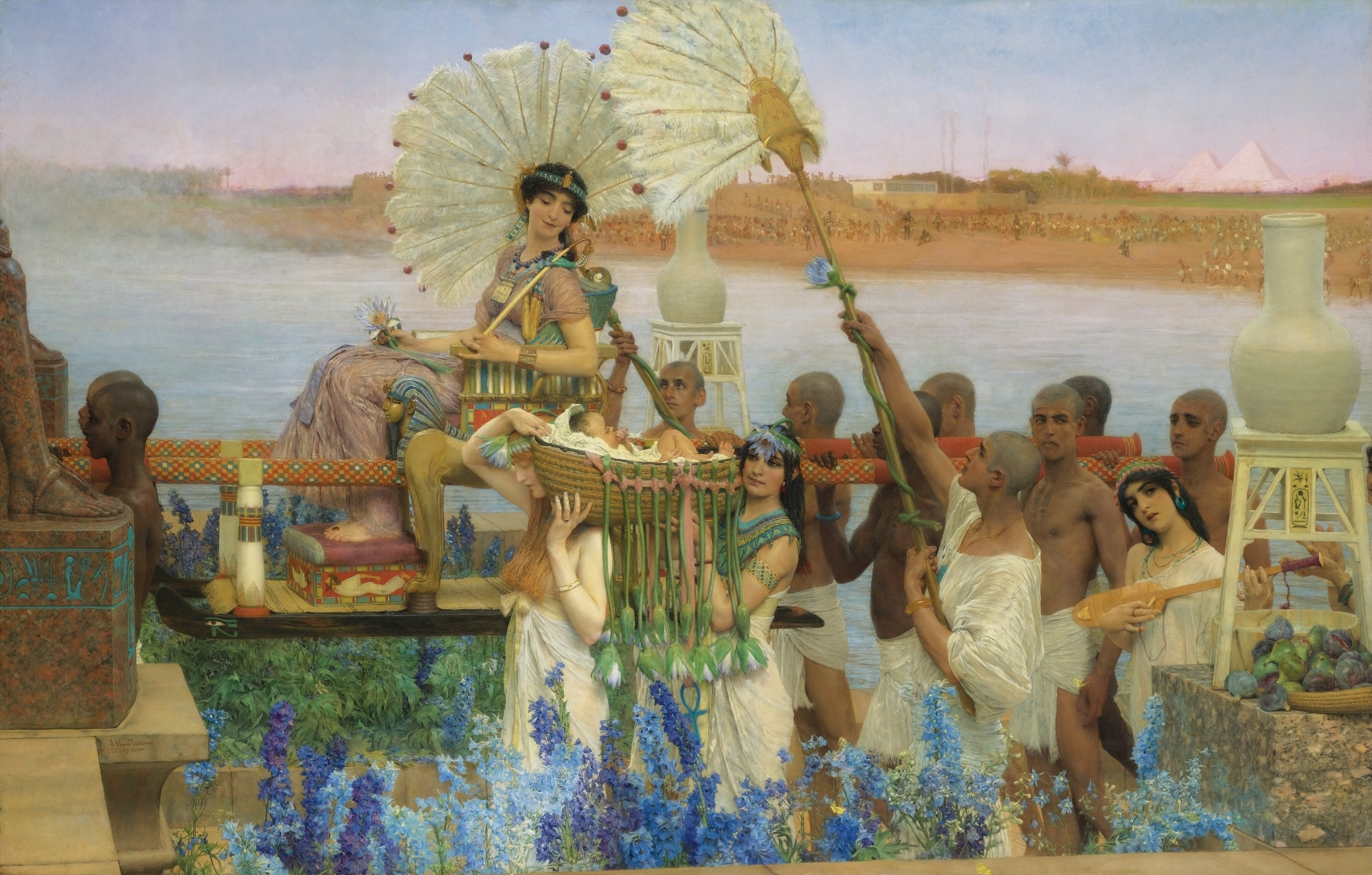
The Finding of Moses, 1904, oil on canvas, 137.7 × 213.4 cm, private collection. It includes a number of archaeologically precise objects and inscriptions, the results of Tadema's diligent research. After Tadema spent two years working on the painting, his wife pointed out wryly that the infant Moses was now a toddler, and need no longer be carried.

As the artist's contemporary biographer Percy Cross Standing noted of Lawrence Alma-Tadema's early paintings of Egyptian subjects in particular, "So careful at all times about detail, he took extraordinary care in the preparation of his preliminary sketches for these pictures". When asked why he had chosen to paint Egyptian themes, Alma-Tadema said: "Where else should I have begun as soon as I had become acquainted with the life of the ancients? The first thing a child learns of ancient history is about the court of Pharaoh; and if we go back to the source of art and science, must we not return to Egypt?”

Several of his early Egyptian paintings contain precise depictions of objects and settings, which reflect the artist's close study of an important reference book of his era: Sir John Gardner Wilkinson's "The Manners and Customs of Ancient Egyptians", published in 1837. Alma-Tadema left Taeye's studio in November 1858 returning to Leeuwarden before settling in Antwerp, where he began working with the painter Baron Jan August Hendrik Leys, whose studio was one of the most highly regarded in Belgium. Under his guidance Alma-Tadema painted his first major work: The Education of the children of Clovis (1861). This painting created a sensation among critics and artists when it was exhibited that year at the Artistic Congress in Antwerp. It is said to have laid the foundation of his fame and reputation. Alma-Tadema related that although Leys thought the completed painting better than he had expected, he was critical of the treatment of marble, which he compared to cheese. He collaborated with Hendrik Leys on the series of wall paintings in the Leys Hall on the second floor of Antwerp City Hall, which depict significant moments in the history of The Netherlands.

Alma-Tadema took this criticism very seriously, and it led him to improve his technique and to become the world's foremost painter of marble and variegated granite. Despite any reproaches from his master, The Education of the Children of Clovis was well received by critics and artists alike and was eventually purchased and subsequently given to King Leopold of Belgium. In 1860 he befriended the Anglo-Dutch Dommersen family of artists in Utrecht.

=== Early works ===
Merovingian subjects were the painter's favourites up to the mid-1860s. However Merovingian subjects did not have a wide international appeal, so he switched to themes of life in ancient Egypt, which were more popular. In 1862 Alma-Tadema left Leys's studio and started his own career, establishing himself as a significant classical-subject artist.

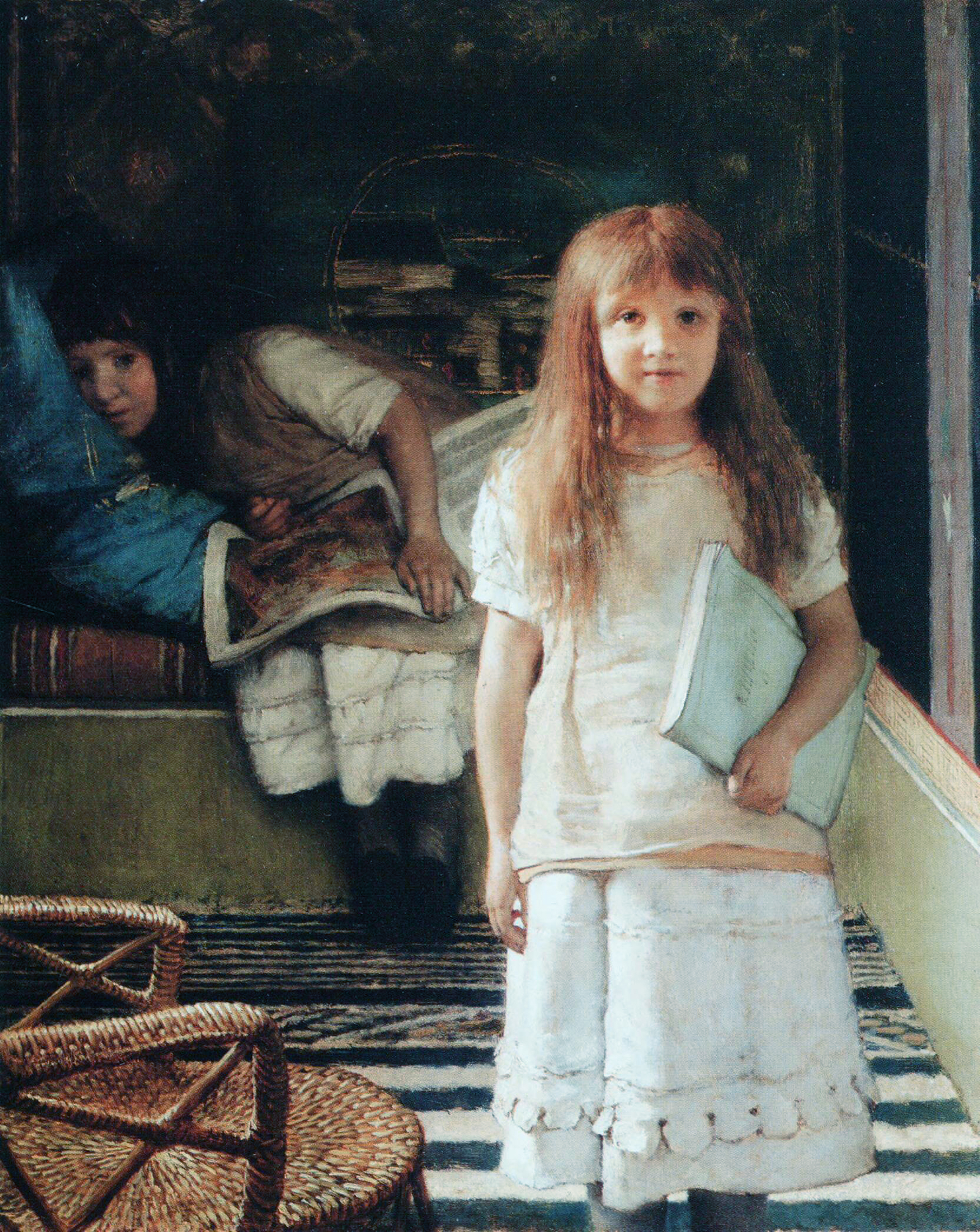
A portrait of the artist's daughters (1873)

On 3 January 1863 his invalid mother died, and on 24 September he was married, in Antwerp City Hall, to Marie-Pauline Gressin-Dumoulin de Boisgirard, the daughter of Eugène Gressin-Dumoulin, a French journalist living near Brussels. Nothing is known of their meeting and little of Pauline herself, as Alma-Tadema never spoke about her after her death in 1869. Her image appears in a number of oils, though he painted her portrait only three times, the most notable appearing in My studio (1867). The couple had three children. Their eldest and only son lived only a few months dying of smallpox. Their two daughters, Laurence (1865–1940) and Anna (1867–1943), both had artistic leanings: the former in literature, the latter in art. Neither would marry.

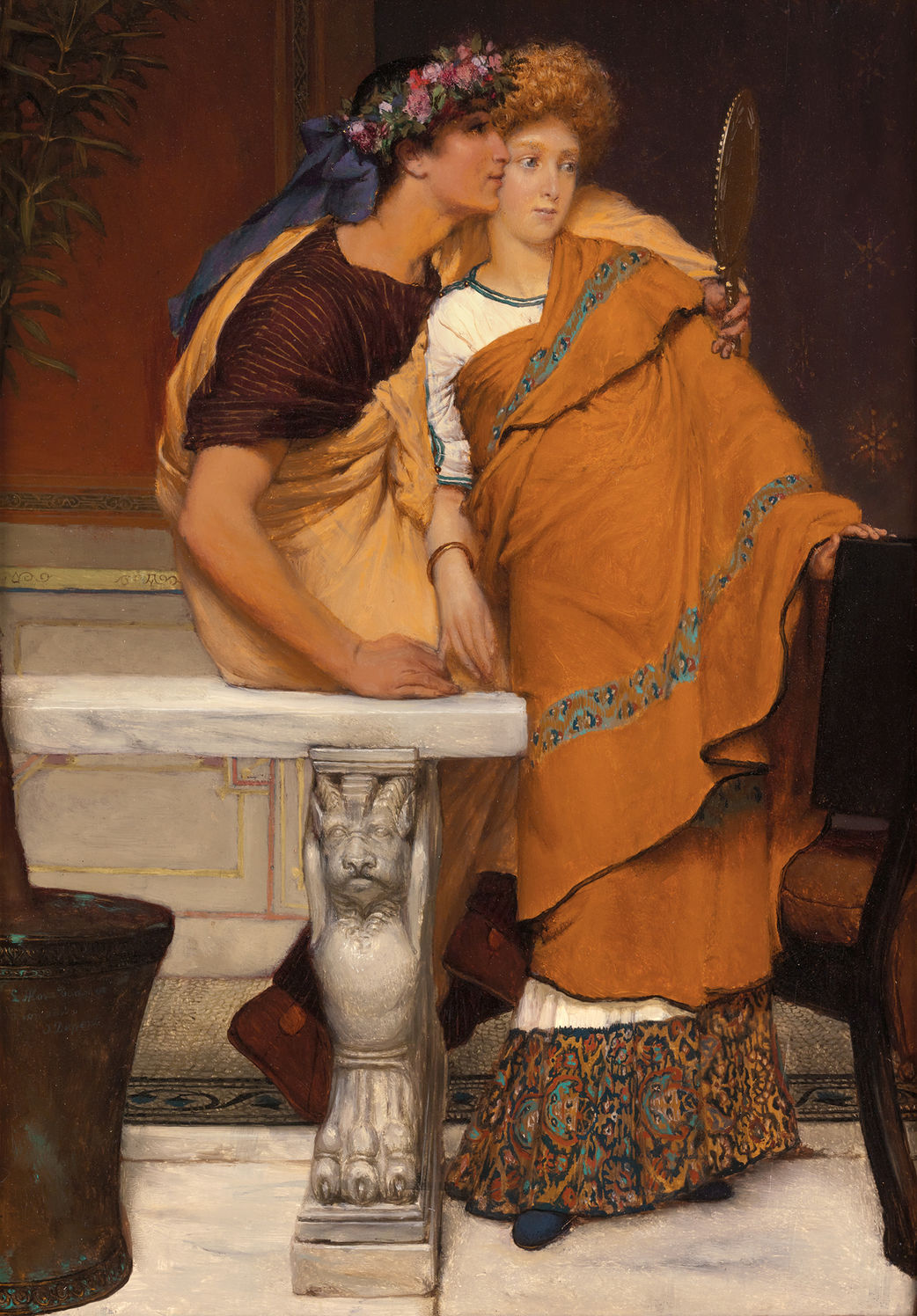
The Mirror, 1868

Alma-Tadema and his wife spent their honeymoon in Florence, Rome, Naples and Pompeii. This, his first visit to Italy, developed his interest in depicting the life of ancient Greece and Rome, especially the latter since he found new inspiration in the ruins of Pompeii, which fascinated him and would inspire much of his work in the coming decades. There he met Geremia Discanno, an Italian painter who had been commissioned by archaeologist Giuseppe Fiorelli to reproduce the brightly painted frescoes being uncovered in the excavations of Pompeii and Herculaneum before they faded from exposure. He would consult Discanno a number of times before Discanno's death in 1907 to ensure his paintings of antiquity would reflect the lifestyle of residents of the Greco-Roman world accurately.

During the summer of 1864, Tadema met Ernest Gambart, the most influential print publisher and art dealer of the period. Gambart was highly impressed with the work of Tadema, who was then painting Egyptian Chess Players (1865). The dealer, recognising at once the unusual gifts of the young painter, gave him an order for twenty-four pictures and arranged for three of Tadema's paintings to be shown in London. In 1865, Tadema relocated to Brussels where he was named a knight of the Order of Leopold.

On 28 May 1869, after years of ill health, Pauline died of smallpox at Schaerbeek in Belgium, aged 32. Her death left Tadema disconsolate and depressed. He ceased painting for nearly four months. His sister Artje, who lived with the family, helped with the two daughters then aged five and two. Artje took over the role of housekeeper and remained with the family until 1873 when she married.

During the summer Tadema himself began to suffer from a medical problem which doctors in Brussels were unable to diagnose. Gambart eventually advised him to go to England for another medical opinion. Soon after his arrival in London in December 1869, Alma-Tadema was invited to the home of the painter Ford Madox Brown. There he met Laura Theresa Epps, who was seventeen years old, and fell in love with her at first sight.

=== Move to England ===
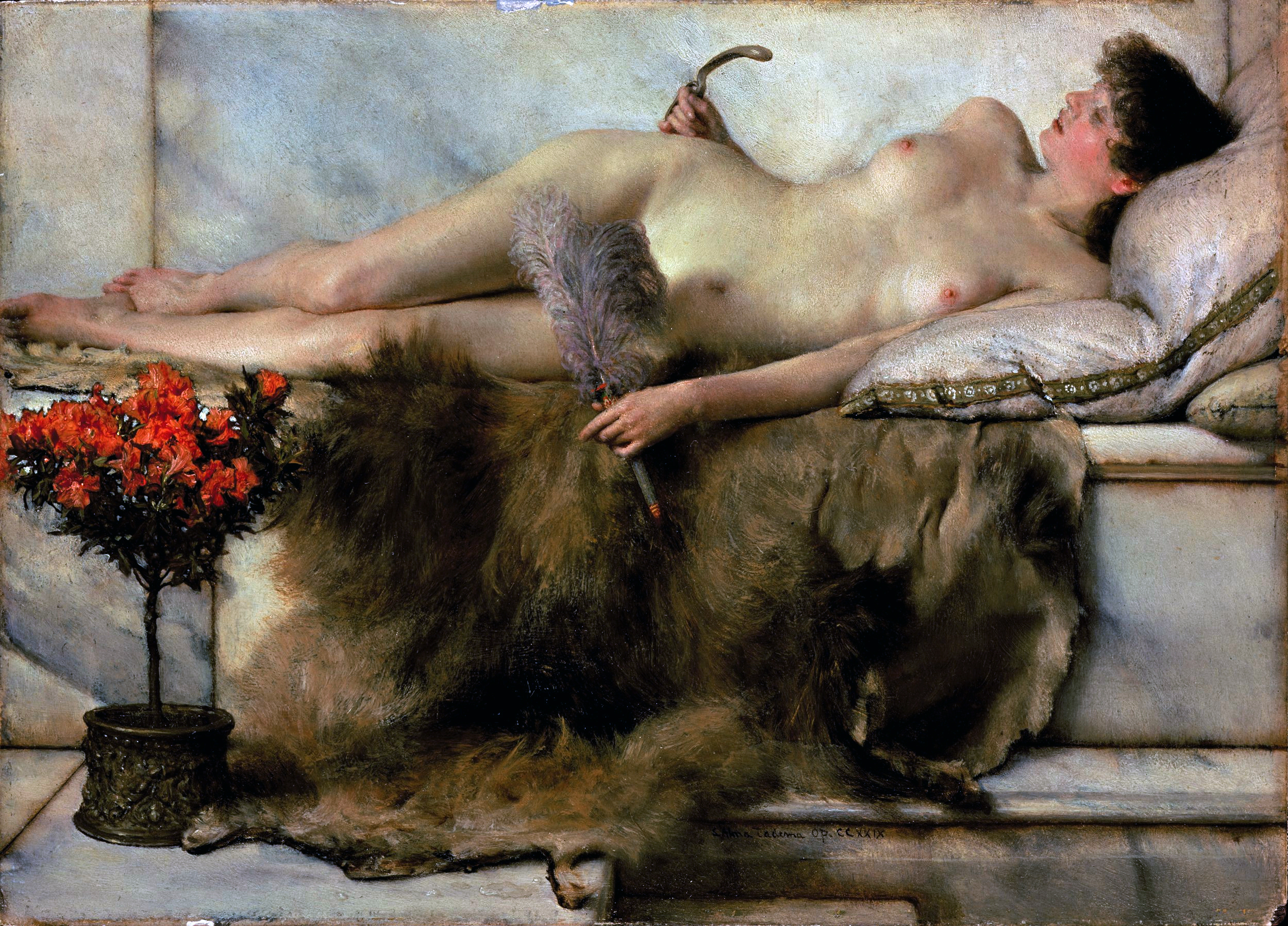
The Tepidarium (1881), oil on panel, 24 × 33 cm. Lady Lever Art Gallery, Port Sunlight. Lounging next to the tepidarium, a curvaceous beauty takes her rest. She holds a strigil in her right hand.

The outbreak of the Franco-Prussian War in July 1870 encouraged Alma-Tadema to leave the continent and move to London. His infatuation with Laura Epps played a great part in his relocation to England and in addition Gambart felt that the move would be advantageous to the artist's career. In stating his reasons for the move, Tadema simply said "I lost my first wife, a French lady with whom I married in 1863, in 1869. Having always had a great predilection for London, the only place where, up till then my work had met with buyers, I decided to leave the continent and go to settle in England, where I have found a true home."

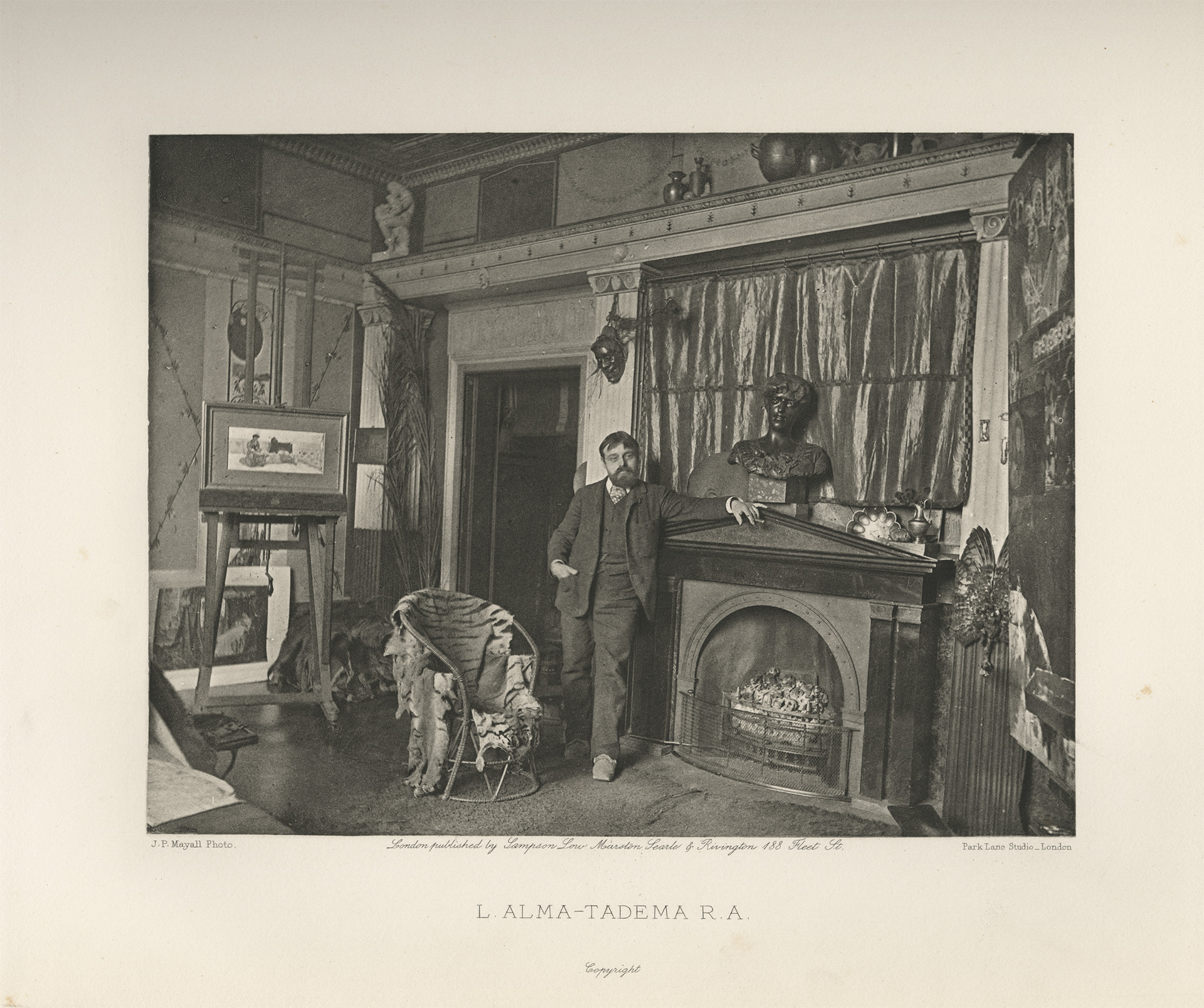
Lawrence Alma-Tadema by J. P. Mayall from Artists at Home, photogravure, published 1884, Department of Image Collections, National Gallery of Art Library, Washington, DC

With his small daughters and sister Artje, Alma-Tadema arrived in London at the beginning of September 1870. The painter wasted no time in contacting Laura, and it was arranged that he would give her painting lessons. During one of these, he proposed marriage. As he was then thirty-four and Laura was now only eighteen, her father was initially opposed to the idea. Dr Epps finally agreed on the condition that they should wait until they knew each other better. They married in July 1871. Laura, under her married name, also won a high reputation as an artist, and appears in numerous of Alma-Tadema's canvases after their marriage (The Women of Amphissa (1887) being a notable example). This second marriage was enduring and happy, though childless, and Laura became stepmother to Anna and Laurence. Anna became a painter and Laurence became a novelist.

In England he initially adopted the name Laurence Alma Tadema instead of Lourens Alma Tadema and later used the more English spelling Lawrence for his forename. He also incorporated Alma into his surname so that he appeared at the beginning of exhibition catalogues, under "A" rather than under "T". He did not actually hyphenate his last name, but it was done by others and this has since become the convention.

=== Victorian painter ===
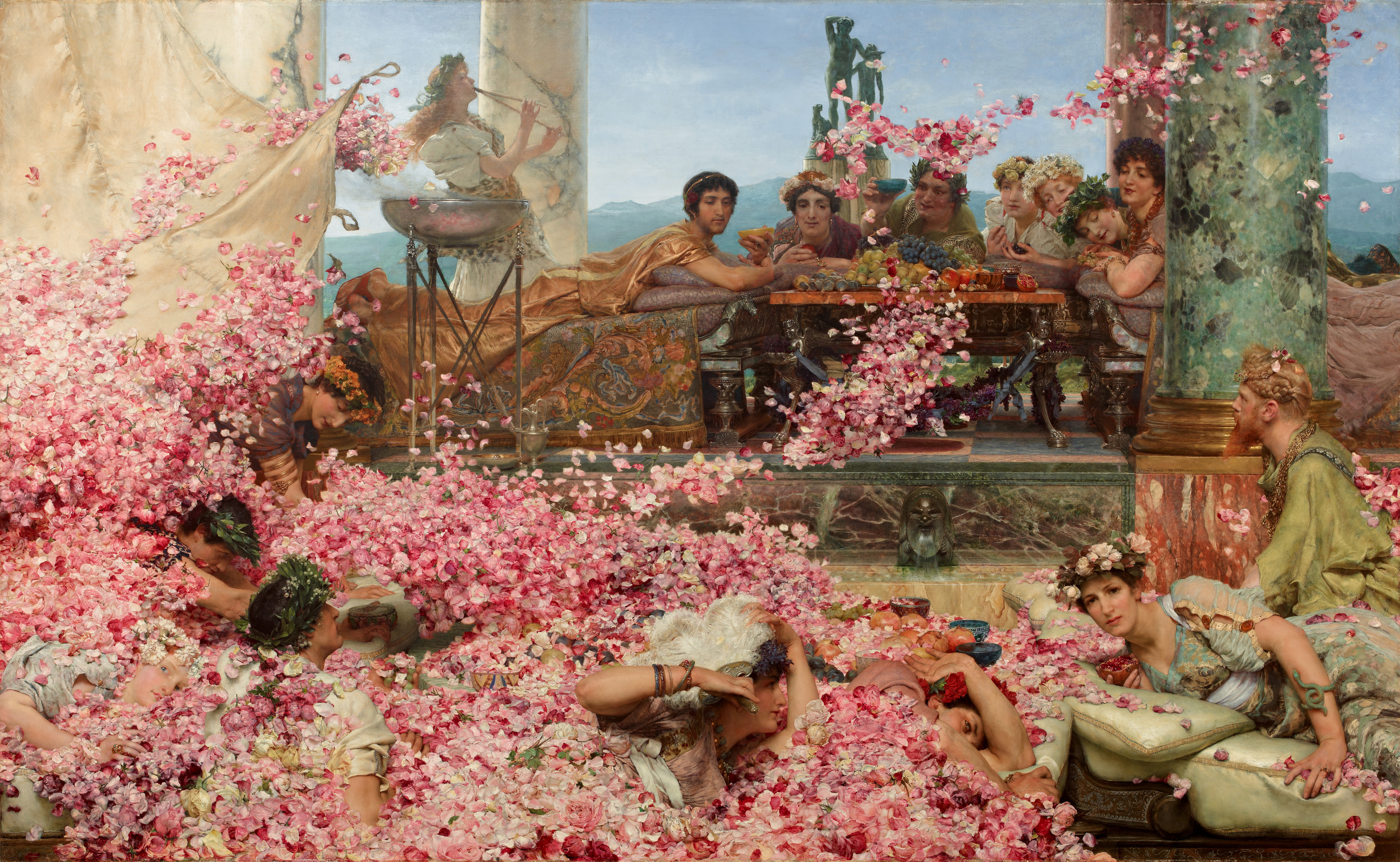
The Roses of Heliogabalus (1888), oil on canvas, 132.1 × 213.7 cm, private collection. As it was painted during the winter, Tadema arranged to have roses sent weekly from the French Riviera for four months to ensure the accuracy of each petal.

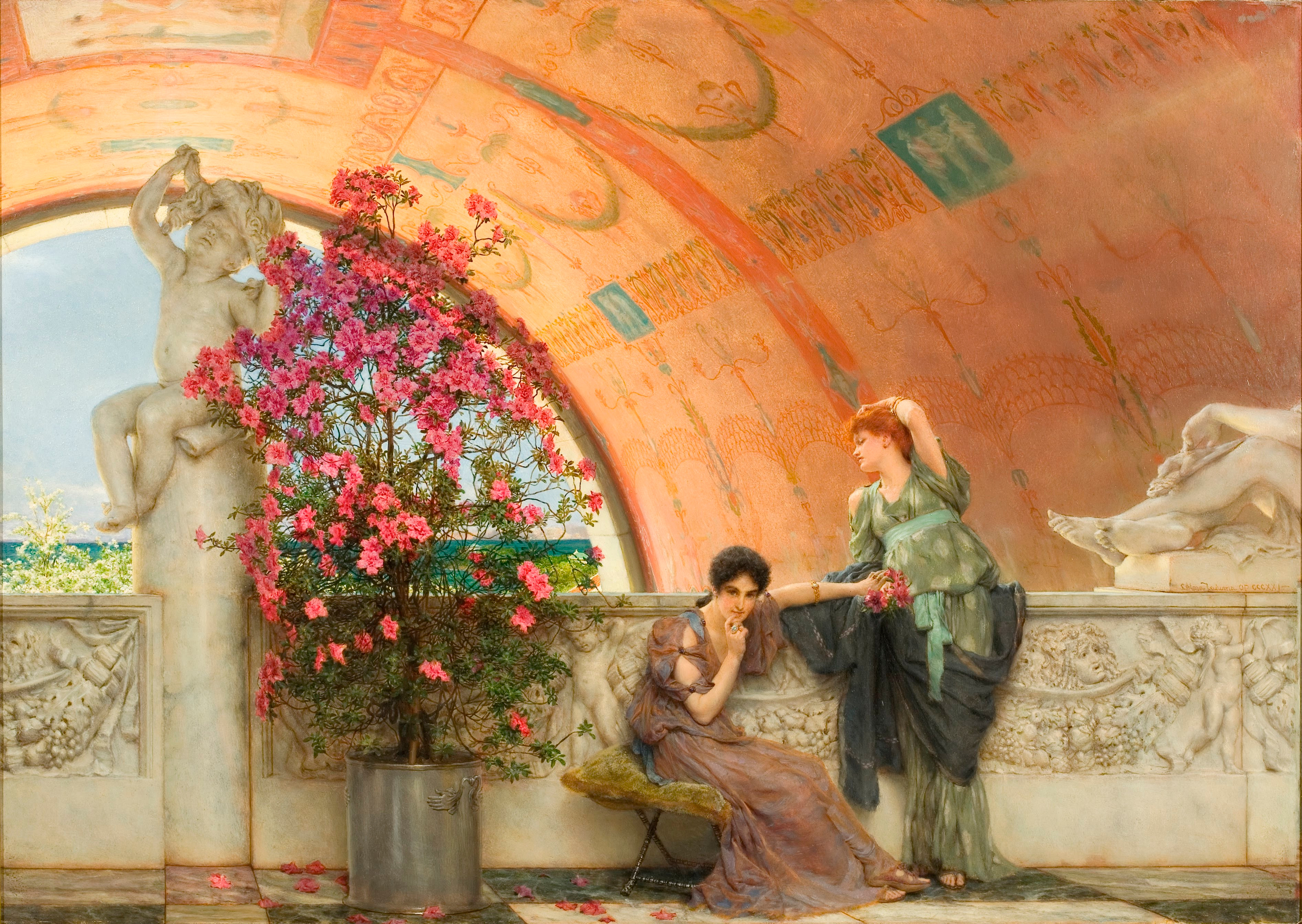
Unconscious Rivals (1893), oil on panel, 45 × 63 cm, Bristol City Museum and Art Gallery. Alma-Tadema's female figures have a slightly bored pleasure-seeking attitude, as if they were pampered courtesans. There is little action in Alma-Tadema's paintings. The composition is balanced by the flowers in bloom.

After his arrival in England, where he was to spend the rest of his life, Alma-Tadema's career was one of continued success. He became one of the most famous and highly paid artists of his time. By 1871 he had met and befriended most of the major Pre-Raphaelite painters and it was in part due to their influence that the artist brightened his palette, varied his hues, and lightened his brushwork.

In 1872 Alma-Tadema organised his paintings into an identification system by including an opus number under his signature and assigning his earlier pictures numbers as well. Portrait of my sister, Artje, painted in 1851, is numbered opus I, while two months before his death he completed Preparations in the Coliseum, opus CCCCVIII. Such a system made it more difficult for fakes to be passed off as originals.

In 1873 Queen Victoria in Council by letters patent made Alma-Tadema and his wife the last British denizens, with some limited special rights otherwise only accorded to and enjoyed by British subjects; while the legal process has never been formally abolished, Alma-Tadema's case remains the last time it was applied. The previous year he and his wife made a journey on the continent that lasted five and a half months and took them through Brussels, Germany, and Italy. In Italy Alma-Tadema was able to take in the ancient ruins again; this time he purchased several photographs, mostly of the ruins, which began his immense collection of archival material used in the completion of future paintings. In January 1876, he rented a studio in Rome. The family returned to London in April, visiting the Paris Salon on their way back. In London he regularly met with fellow-artist Emil Fuchs.

Among the most important of his pictures during this period was An Audience at Agrippa's (1876). When an admirer of the painting offered to pay a substantial sum for a painting with a similar subject, Alma-Tadema simply turned the emperor around to show him leaving, in After the Audience. On 19 June 1879, Alma-Tadema was made a Royal Academician. Three years later, a major retrospective of his entire oeuvre was organised at the Grosvenor Gallery in London, including 185 of his pictures.

In 1883 he returned to Rome and Pompeii, where further excavations had taken place since his last visit. He spent a significant amount of time studying the site, going there daily. These excursions gave him an ample source of subject matter as he began to further his knowledge of daily Roman life. At times, however, he integrated so many objects into his paintings that some said they resembled museum catalogues.

One of his most famous paintings is The Roses of Heliogabalus (1888) – based on an episode from the life of the debauched Roman emperor Elagabalus (Heliogabalus), the painting depicts the emperor suffocating his guests at an orgy under a cascade of rose petals. The blossoms depicted were sent weekly to the artist's London studio from the French Riviera for four months during the winter of 1887–1888.

Among Alma-Tadema's works of this period are: An Earthly Paradise (1891), Unconscious Rivals (1893) Spring (1894), The Coliseum (1896) and The Baths of Caracalla (1899). Although Alma-Tadema's fame rests on his paintings set in antiquity, he also painted portraits, landscapes and watercolours, and made some etchings himself. (Many more were made of his paintings by others).

=== Personality ===
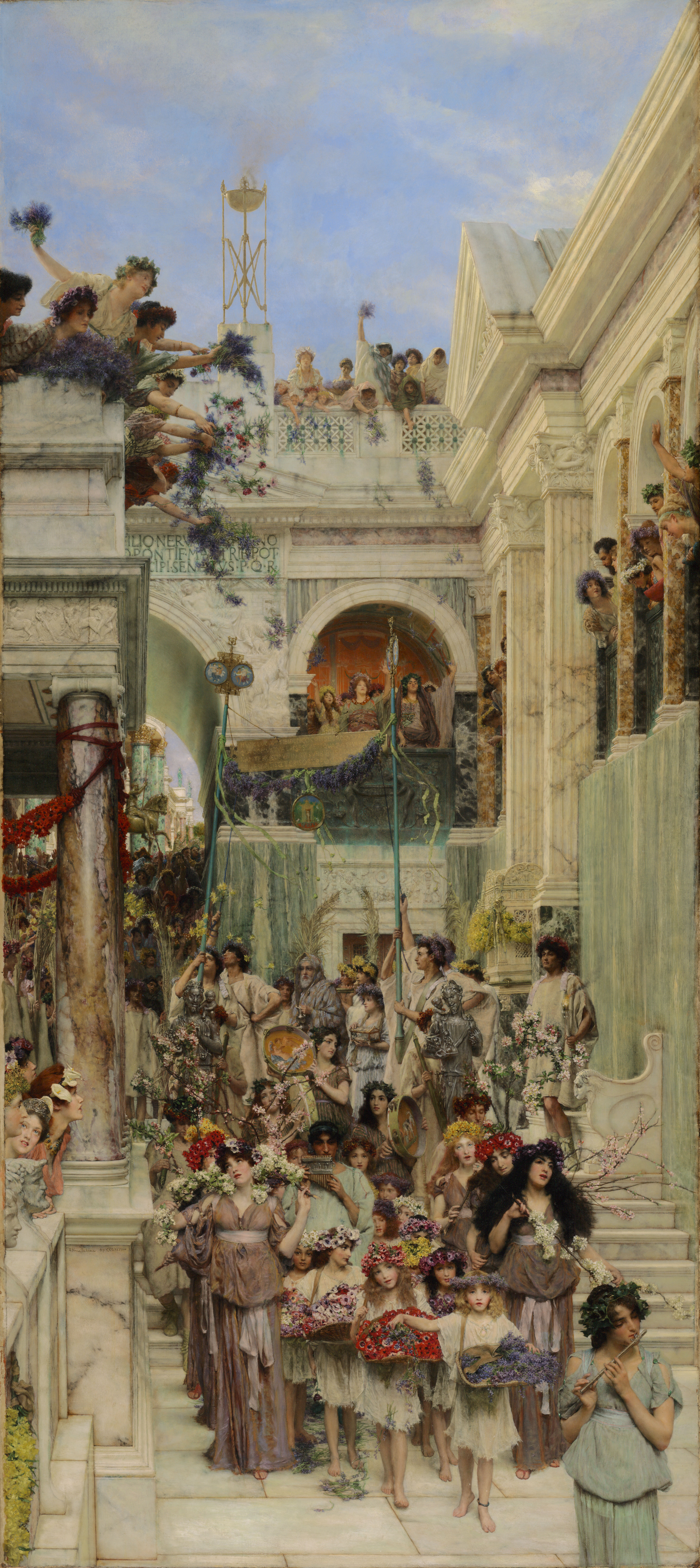
Spring (1894), oil on canvas,179.2 × 80.3 cm, J. Paul Getty Museum, Los Angeles (Note: The painting relates the Victorian custom of children collecting flowers on May Day back to an Ancient Roman spring festival, perhaps Cerealia, Floralia or Ambarvalia, although the details depicted in the painting do not correspond to any single Roman festival. It is one of Tadema's most famous and popular works, it took him four years to complete. The models for many of the participants and spectators were Tadema's friends and members of his family.)

In his personal life, Alma-Tadema was known to have an extroverted personality. There was not a hint of the delicate artist about him; he was a cheerful lover of wine, women, and parties.

He has been said to have had most of the characteristics of a child, coupled with the traits of a consummate professional. A perfectionist, he remained in all respects a diligent, if somewhat obsessive and pedantic worker. He was an excellent businessman, and one of the wealthiest artists of the nineteenth century. Alma-Tadema was as firm in money matters as he was with the quality of his work.

=== Later years ===
Alma-Tadema's pacing steadied with time, partly on account of health, but also because of his obsession with decorating his new home, to which he moved in 1883. Nevertheless, he continued to exhibit throughout the 1880s and 1890s, receiving accolades including the medal of Honour at the Paris Exposition Universelle of 1889, election to an honorary membership of the Oxford University Dramatic Society in 1890, and the Great Gold Medal at the International Exposition in Brussels of 1897. In 1899, he was knighted by Britain, only the eighth artist from the Continent to receive this honour. He assisted with organizing the British section at the 1900 Exposition Universelle in Paris, as well as exhibiting two works that earned him the Grand Prix Diploma. He also assisted with the St. Louis World's Fair of 1904, where he was well received.

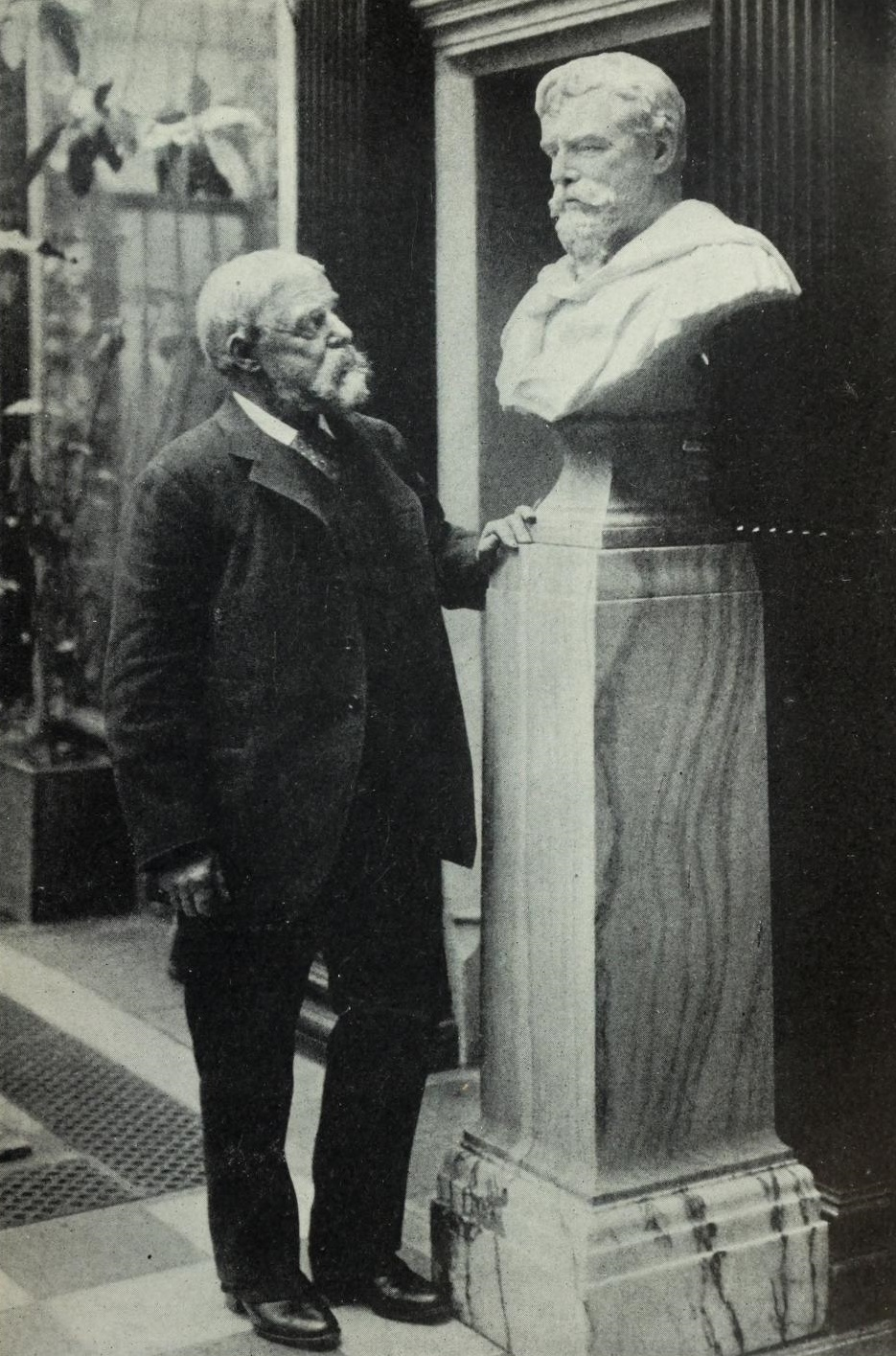
Alma-Tadema standing next to a portrait bust of him (1912)

During this time, Alma-Tadema was very active with theatre design and production, designing many costumes. He also began to design furniture, often modelled after Pompeian or Egyptian motifs, as well as illustrations, textiles, and picture frames. In late 1902 he visited Egypt. These other interests influenced his paintings, as he often incorporated some of his furniture designs and female costumes into the composition. Through his last period of creativity Alma-Tadema continued to produce paintings which repeated the successful formula of women on marble terraces overlooking the sea such as in Silver Favourites (1903). Between 1903 and his death, Alma-Tadema painted less but still produced ambitious paintings such as The Finding of Moses (1904).

On 15 August 1909 Alma-Tadema's wife, Laura, died at the age of fifty-seven. The grief-stricken widower outlived his second wife by less than three years. His last major composition was Preparation in the Coliseum (1912). In the summer of 1912, Alma-Tadema was accompanied by his daughter Anna to Kaiserhof Spa, Wiesbaden, Germany, to be treated for stomach ulcers. He died there on 28 June 1912 at the age of seventy-six. He was buried in the crypt of St Paul's Cathedral in London.

In 1975, a blue plaque was unveiled in his honour. This plaque commemorates Alma-Tadema at 44 Grove End Road, St John's Wood, his home from 1886 until his death in 1912.

== Style ==
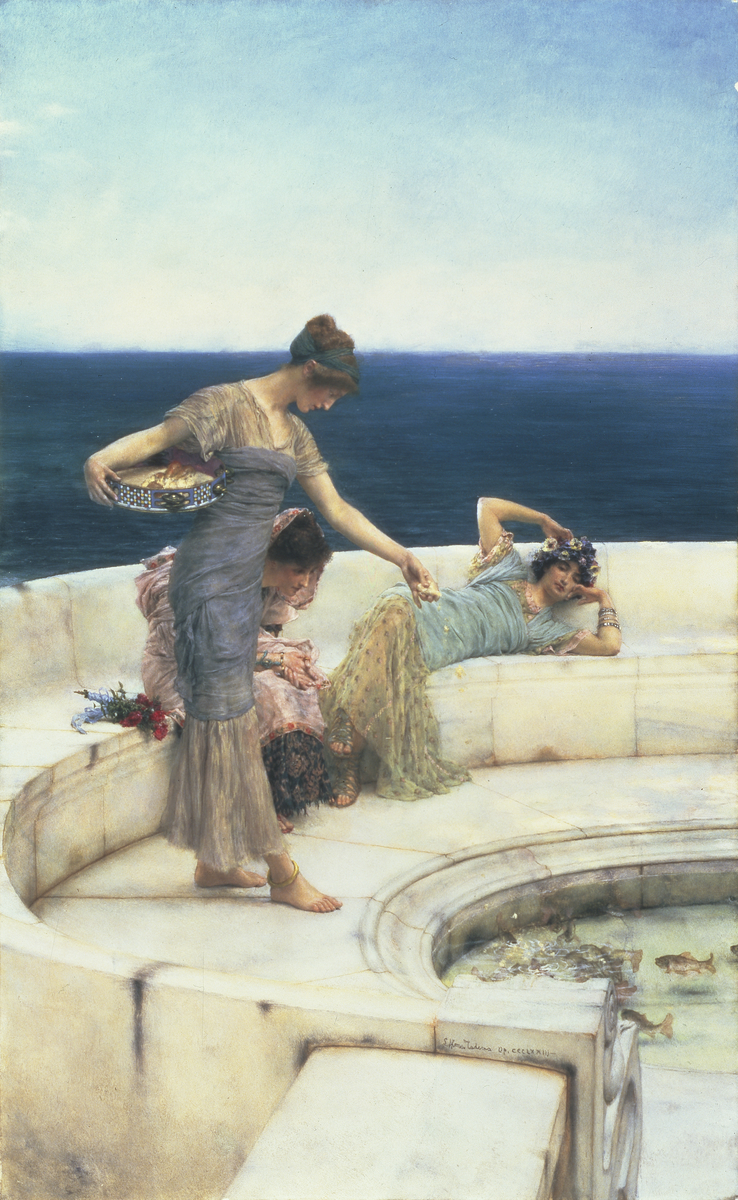
Silver Favourites, 1903, oil on wood, 69.1 × 42.2 cm, Manchester Art Gallery. An example of Alma-Tadema's contrasting gleaming white marble against a backdrop of dazzling blue Mediterranean sea. The artist obliterated the middle-ground, and the foreground is abruptly juxtaposed with the distant horizon, creating a dramatic effect.

Alma-Tadema's works are remarkable for their depiction of flowers, textures and hard reflecting substances like metals, pottery, and especially marble (leading to the nickname 'marbellous painter'). His work shows much of the fine execution and brilliant colour of the old Dutch masters.

From early in his career, Alma-Tadema was particularly concerned with architectural accuracy, often painting objects from museums, such as the British Museum in London. He also took many images from books and amassed an enormous number of photographs from ancient sites in Italy, which he used to achieve the most precise detail in his painting.

Alma-Tadema was a perfectionist, repeatedly reworking parts of paintings until he found them satisfactory. One story relates that after one of his paintings was rejected, he gave the canvas to a maid for a table cover. He was sensitive to every detail and architectural line in his settings. He would often paint from life, using fresh flowers from across Europe and even Africa, rushing to paint the flowers before they withered. His commitment to veracity earned him recognition, but also led some critics to accuse him of pedantry.

Alma-Tadema's work has been linked with that of European Symbolist painters. He influenced European painters such as Gustav Klimt and Fernand Khnopff, who incorporated classical motifs, as well as Alma-Tadema's unconventional compositional devices such as abrupt cut-off at the edge of the canvas. Like Alma-Tadema, they also employ coded imagery to suggest hidden meanings.

== Reputation and sale prices ==
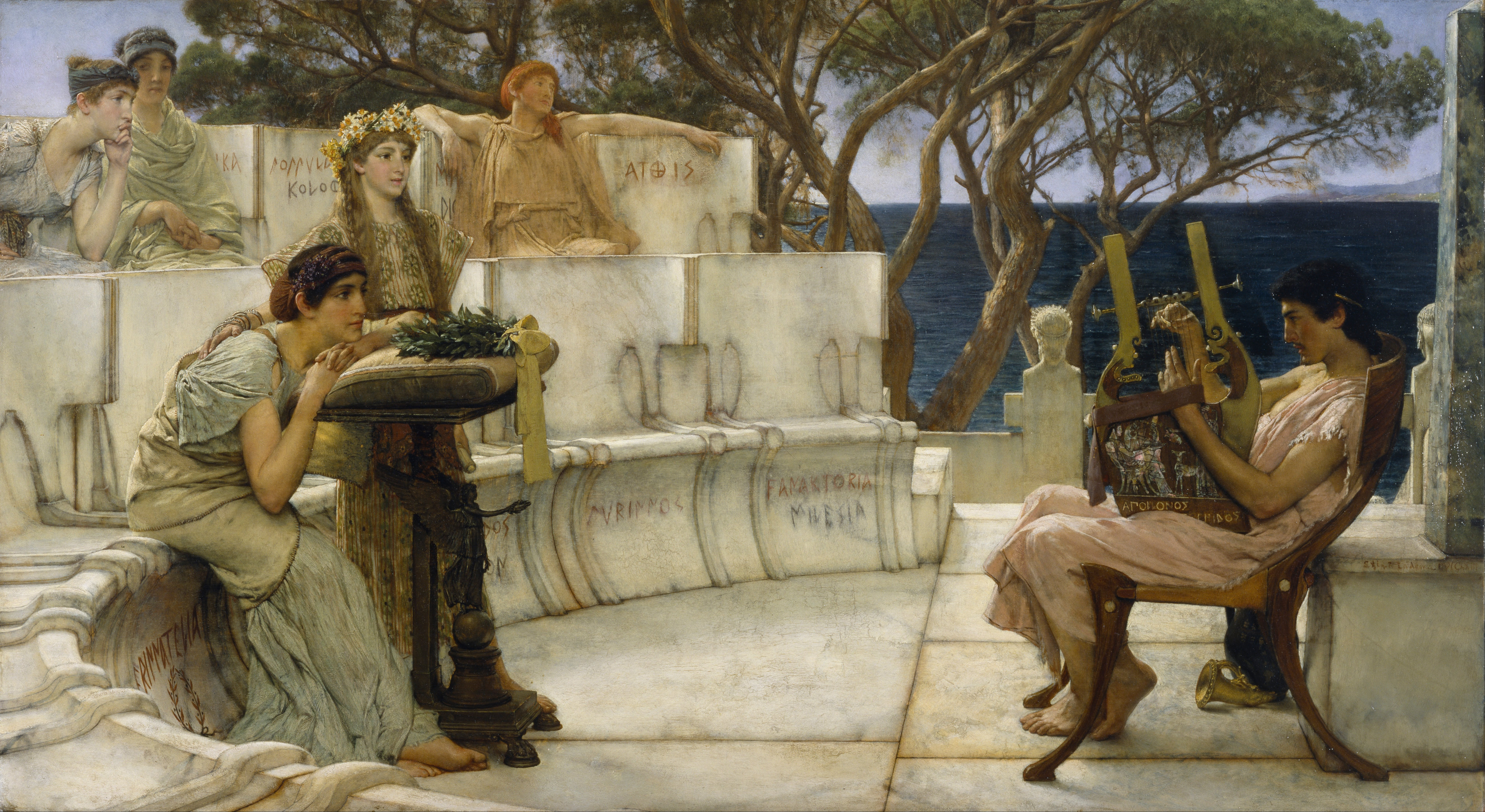
Sappho and Alcaeus, completed in 1881, depicts Sappho and her companions listening as the poet Alcaeus of Mytilene plays a kithara, on the island of Lesbos (Walters Art Museum).

Alma-Tadema was one of the most popular painters of the Victorian era, and among the most financially successful, though never matching Edwin Landseer. For over sixty years, he gave his audience exactly what they wanted: distinctive, elaborate paintings of beautiful people in classical settings. His detailed reconstructions of ancient Rome, with languid men and women posed against white marble in dazzling sunlight, provided his audience with a glimpse of an exotic world of titillating luxury and intimate drama.

As with other painters, the reproduction rights for prints were often worth more than the canvas. For example, a painting together with its rights may have been sold to Gambart for £10,000 in 1874; then in 1903, when Alma-Tadema's prices were actually higher, it was sold again without rights for £2,625. Typical prices were between £2,000 and £3,000 in the 1880s, but at least three works sold for between £5,250 and £6,060 in the 1900s. Prices held well until the general collapse of the market for Victorian art in the early 1920s, when they fell to the hundreds, where they remained until the 1960s; by 1969 £4,600 had been reached again (equivalent to about £700 in 1900, adjusted for inflation).

The last years of Alma-Tadema's life saw the rise of Post-Impressionism, Fauvism, Cubism and Futurism, all of which he disapproved. As his pupil John Collier wrote, 'it is impossible to reconcile the art of Alma-Tadema with that of Matisse, Gauguin and Picasso.' His artistic legacy almost vanished. As the taste of the public and the artistic elite turned to twentieth-century modernism, it became fashionable to denounce his style. John Ruskin declared him "the worst painter of the 19th century", and one critic considered his paintings "about worthy enough to adorn bourbon boxes". After this brief period of condemnation, he was consigned to obscurity for the next half century.

Only since the 1960s has Alma-Tadema's work been rediscovered for its historical importance in the evolution of English art. He is now regarded by art historians as one of the principal classical-subject painters of the nineteenth century, whose works demonstrate the care and exactitude of an era mesmerised by trying to visualise the past, some of which was being recovered through archaeological research.

Alma-Tadema's highly detailed depictions of Roman life and architecture, based on meticulous archaeological research, led Hollywood directors to his paintings as models for their cinematic ancient world, in films such as D. W. Griffith's Intolerance (1916), Ben Hur (1926), and Cleopatra (1934). The most notable was Cecil B. DeMille's epic The Ten Commandments (1956): its co-writer Jesse Lasky Jr. described how the director would spread out prints of Alma-Tadema paintings to guide his set designers. The design of the Oscar-winning Roman epic Gladiator (2000) took its main inspiration from his paintings, as well as that of the interior of Cair Paravel castle in The Chronicles of Narnia (2005).

In 1962, New York art dealer Robert Isaacson mounted the first show of Alma-Tadema's work in fifty years, and by the late 1960s, the revival of interest in Victorian painting gained impetus with a number of well-attended exhibitions. Allen Funt, the creator and host of the American television show Candid Camera, was a collector of Alma-Tadema paintings during the 20th century nadir of the artist's reputation; in a few years he bought 35 works, about ten per cent of Alma-Tadema's output. After Funt was robbed by his accountant, he was forced to sell his collection at Sotheby's London in November 1973.

In 1960, the Newman Gallery was unable to sell, or even give away, one of his most celebrated works, The Finding of Moses (1904). The initial purchaser had paid £5,250 in 1904, and subsequent sales were for £861 in 1935, £265 in 1942, and it was "bought in" at £252 in 1960 (having failed to meet its reserve). But when the same picture was auctioned at Christies New York in May 1995, it sold for £1.75 million. On 4 November 2010 it sold for $35,922,500 to an undisclosed bidder at Sotheby's New York, a new record for any Victorian artist. On 5 May 2011, the painting The Meeting of Antony and Cleopatra: 41 BC was sold at the same house for $29.2 million.

Alma-Tadema's The Tepidarium (1881) is included in the 2006 book 1001 Paintings You Must See Before You Die. Julian Treuherz, Keeper of Art Galleries at National Museums Liverpool, describes it as an "exquisitely painted picture... [which] carries a strong erotic charge, rare for a Victorian painting of the nude".

== Archives ==
The Cadbury Research Library at the University of Birmingham holds several archive collections relating to Alma-Tadema, including letters, artwork and photography.

== Gallery ==
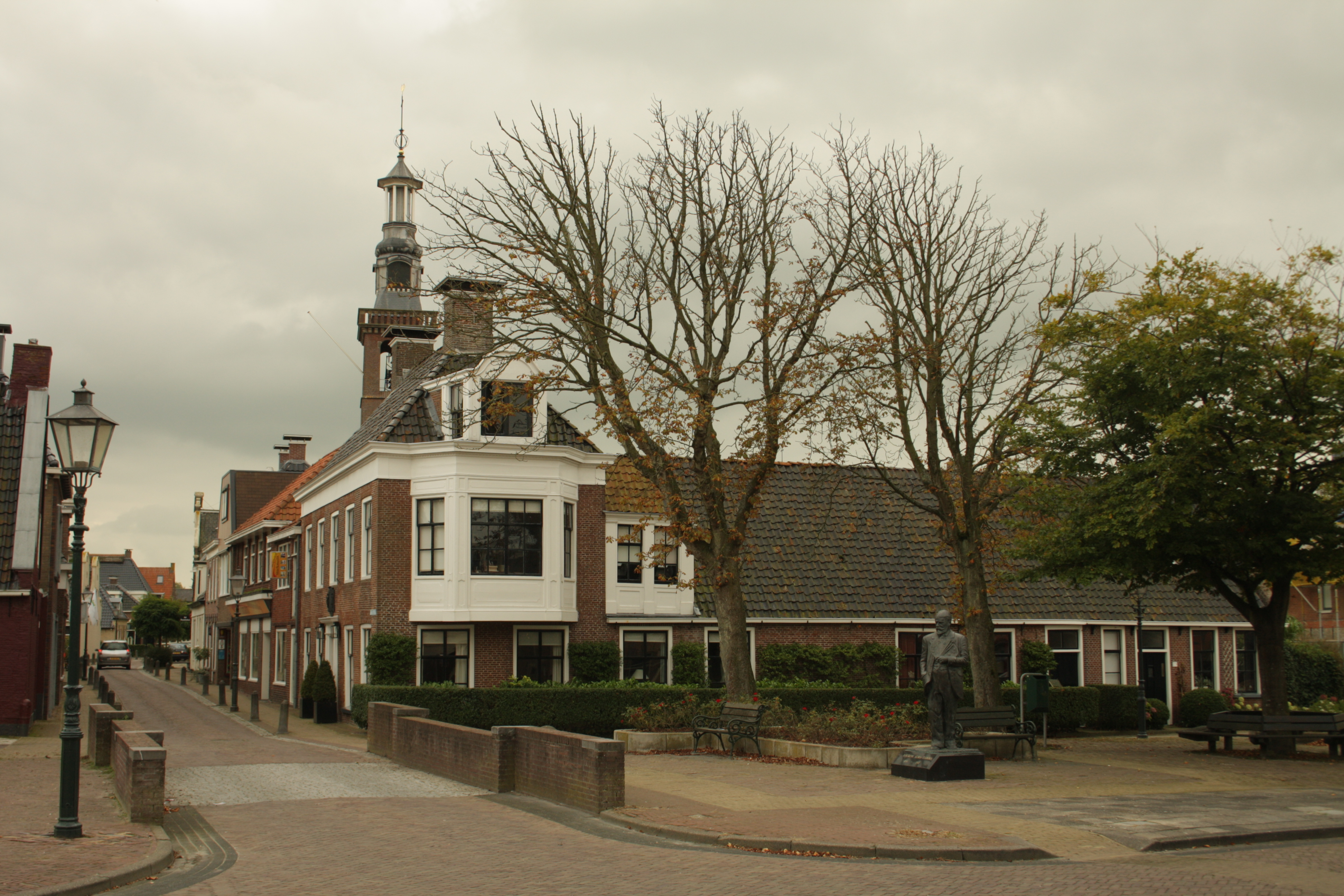
Alma-Tadema's birth house and statue in Dronryp, Netherlands

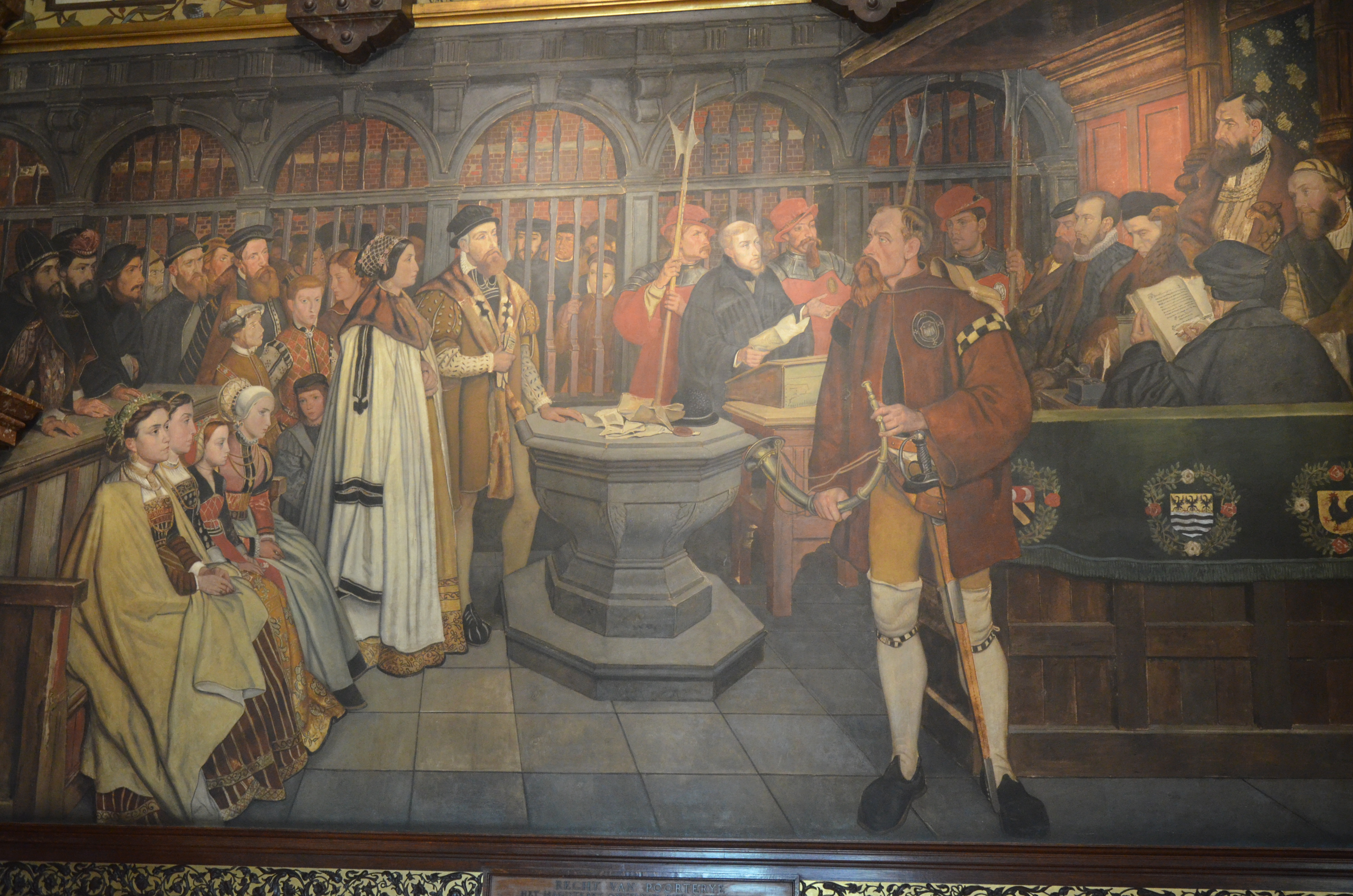
Early uncredited work by Alma-Tadema, collaborating with Hendrik Leys at Antwerp City Hall

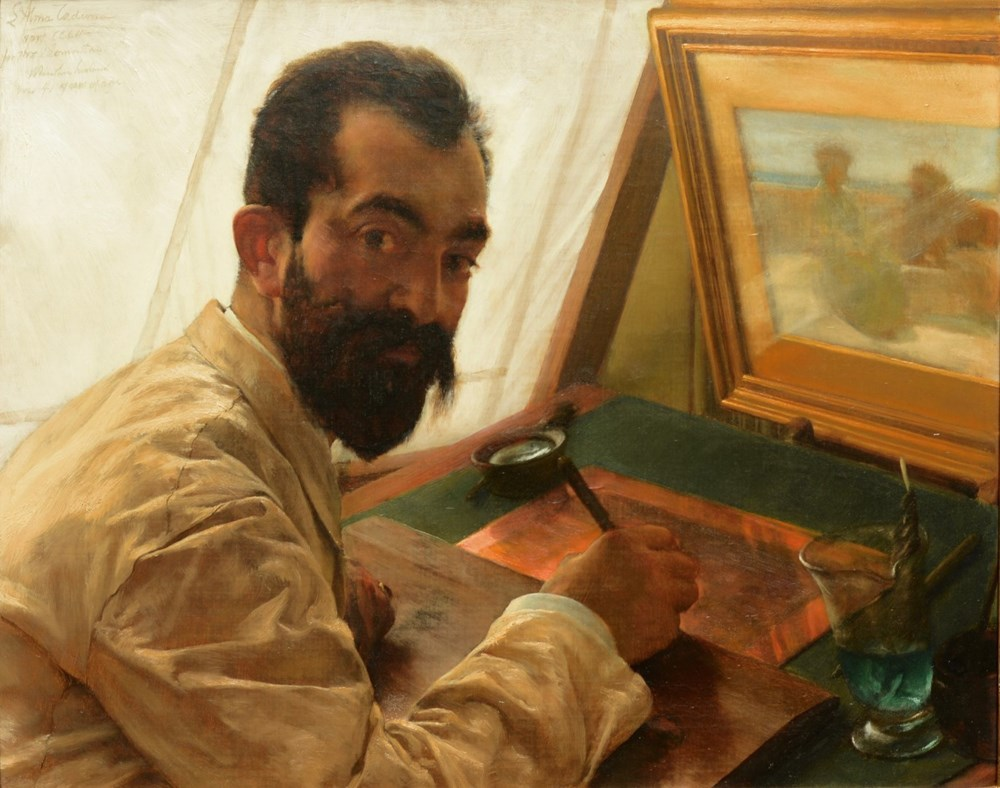
The etcher and printmaker Léopold Lowenstam (1842–1898), a friend and colleague of Alma-Tadema

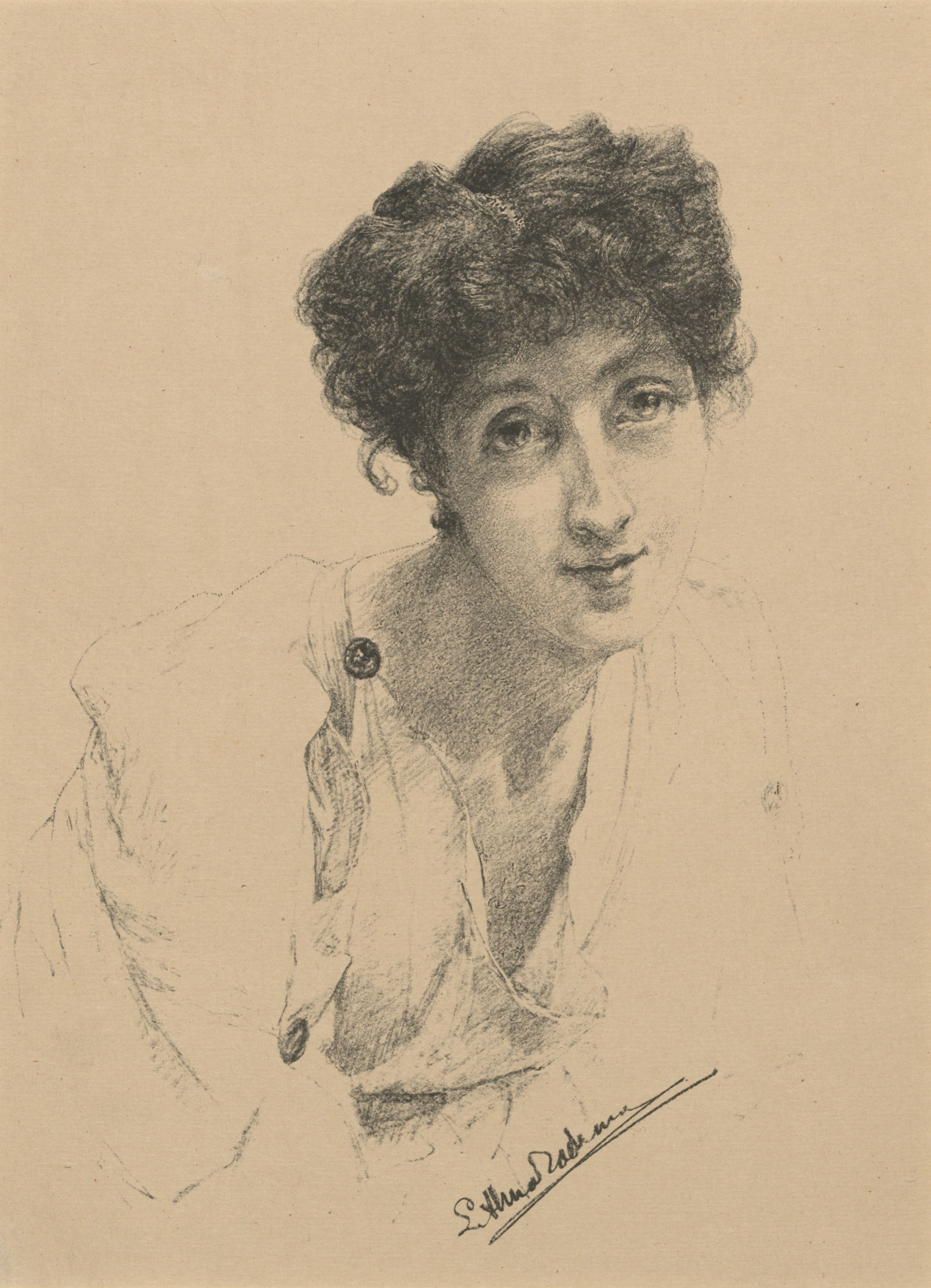
A Study, Aberdeen Archives, Gallery and Museums

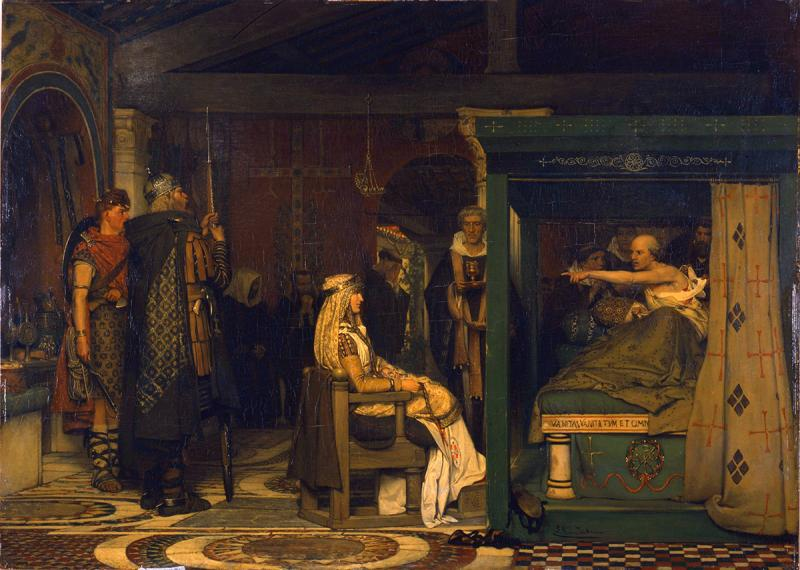
Fredegund by the Deathbed of Bishop Praetextatus, 1864, Pushkin Museum

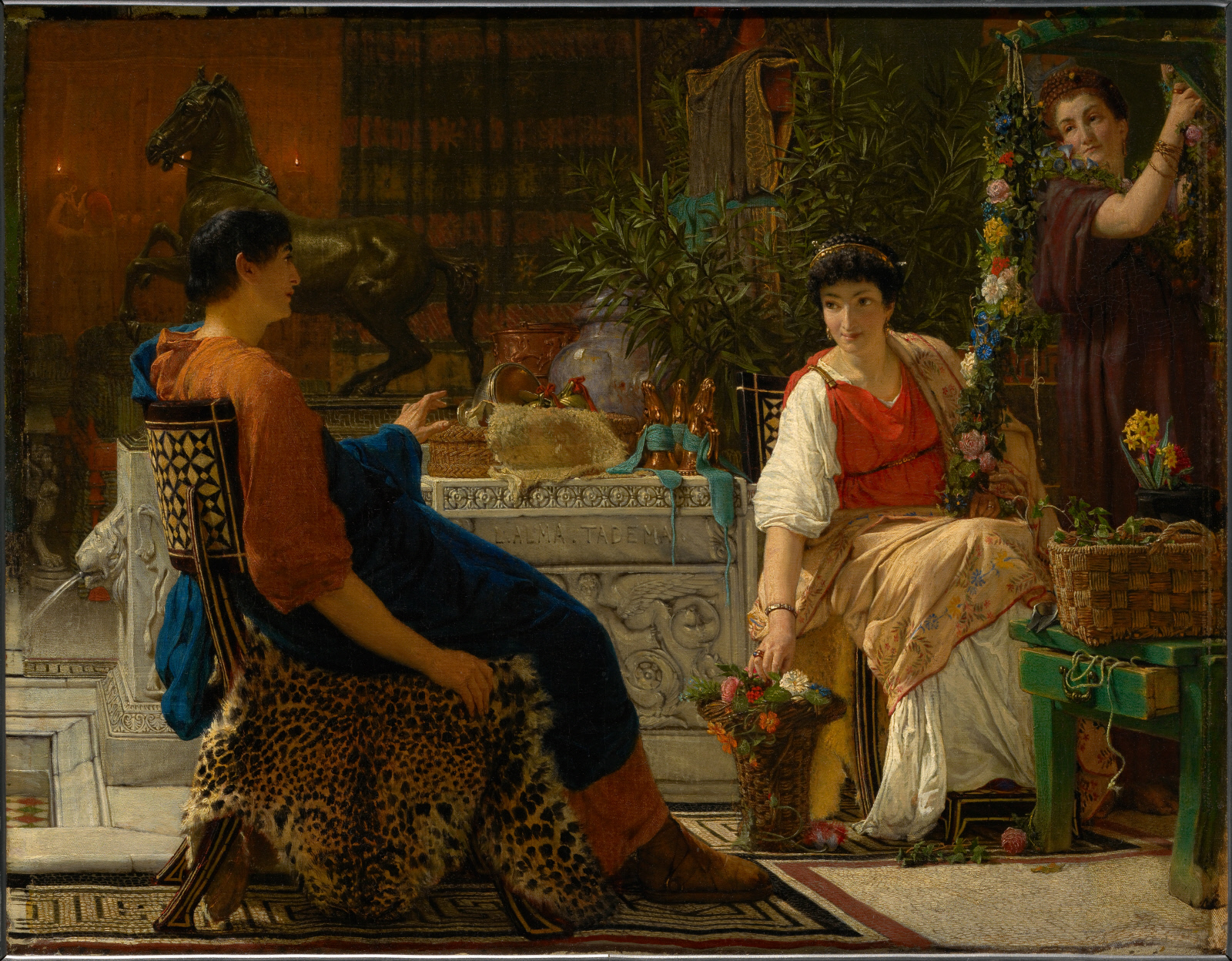
Preparations for the Festivities, 1866, oil on canvas, 21 1/16 x 27 3/16 Clark Art Institute

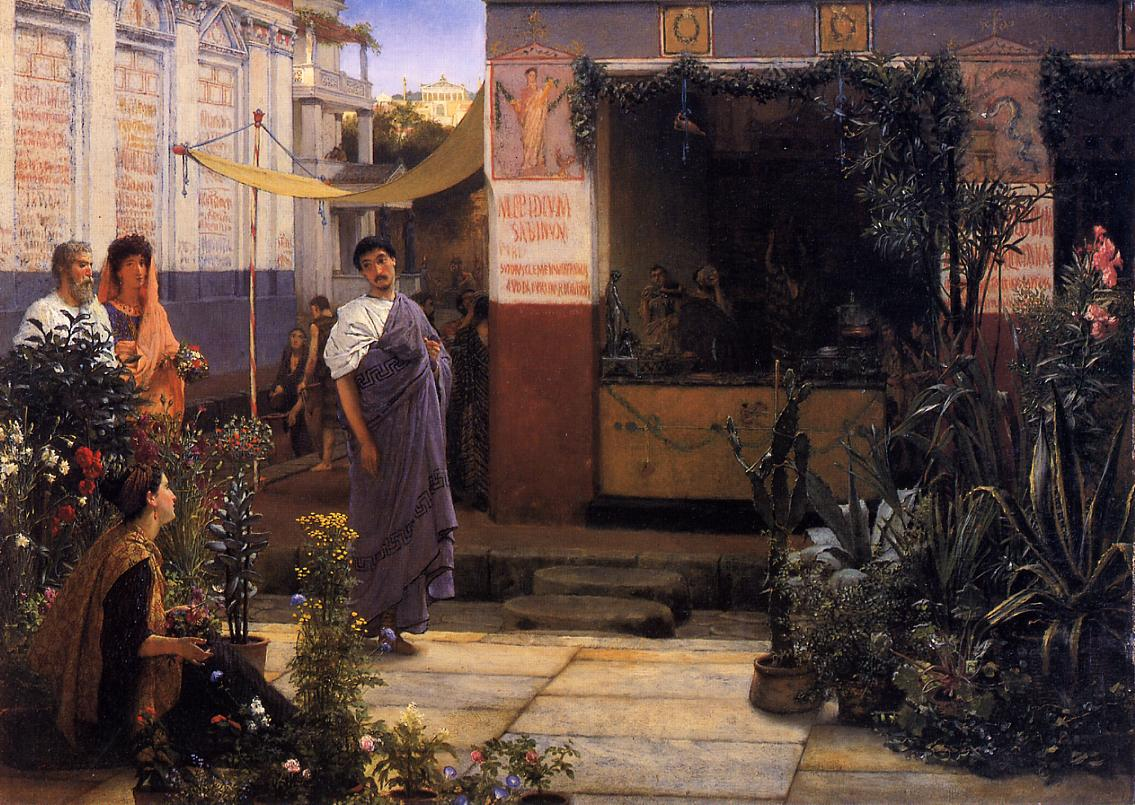
A Roman Flower Market, with a cactus and two agaves (an anachronism, as they are originally American plants), 1868, Manchester Art Gallery

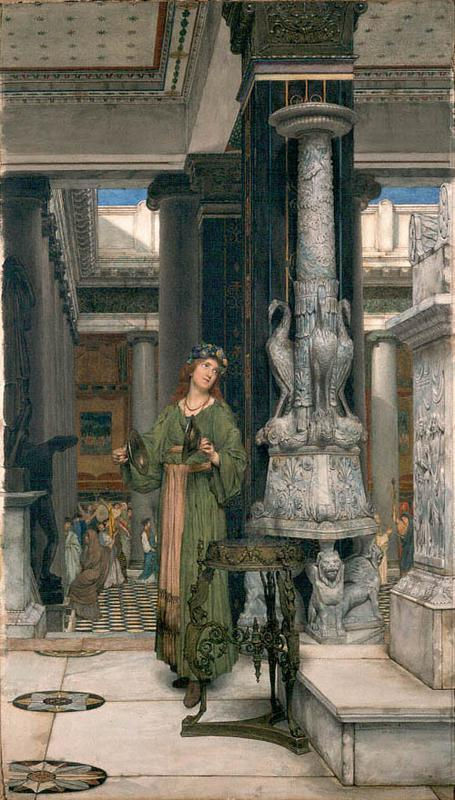
The Cymbal Player, 1872, Aberdeen Archives, Gallery and Museums

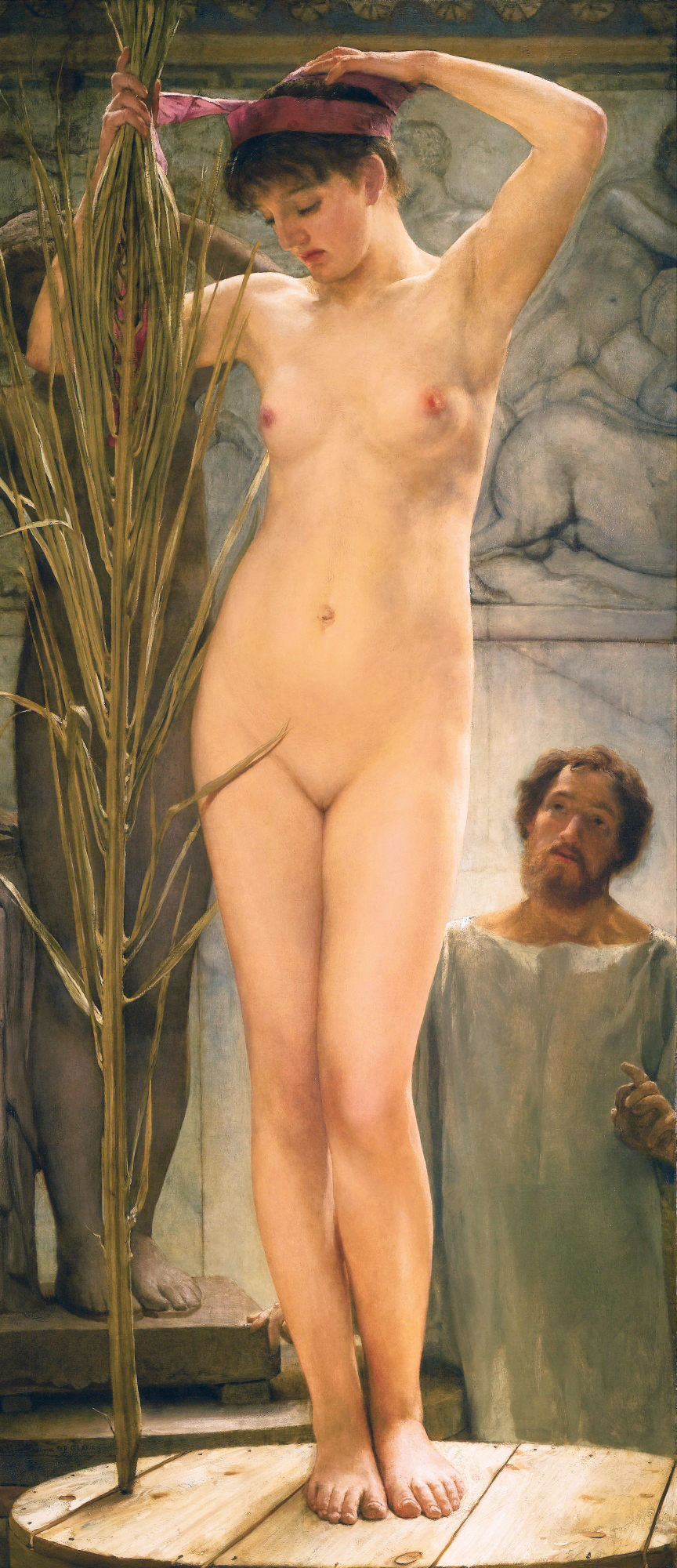
A Sculptor's Model, 1877

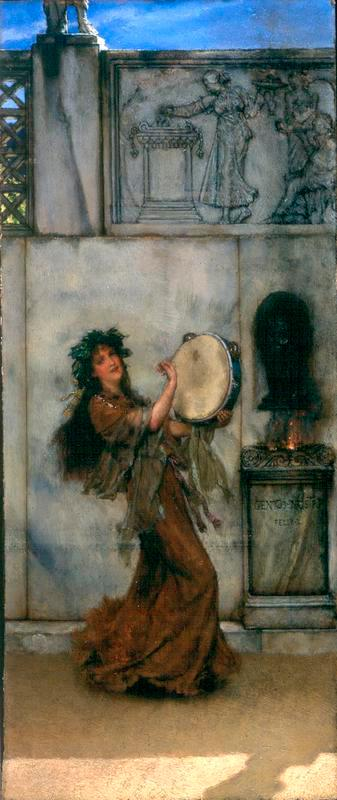
A Garden Altar, 1879, Aberdeen Archives, Gallery and Museums

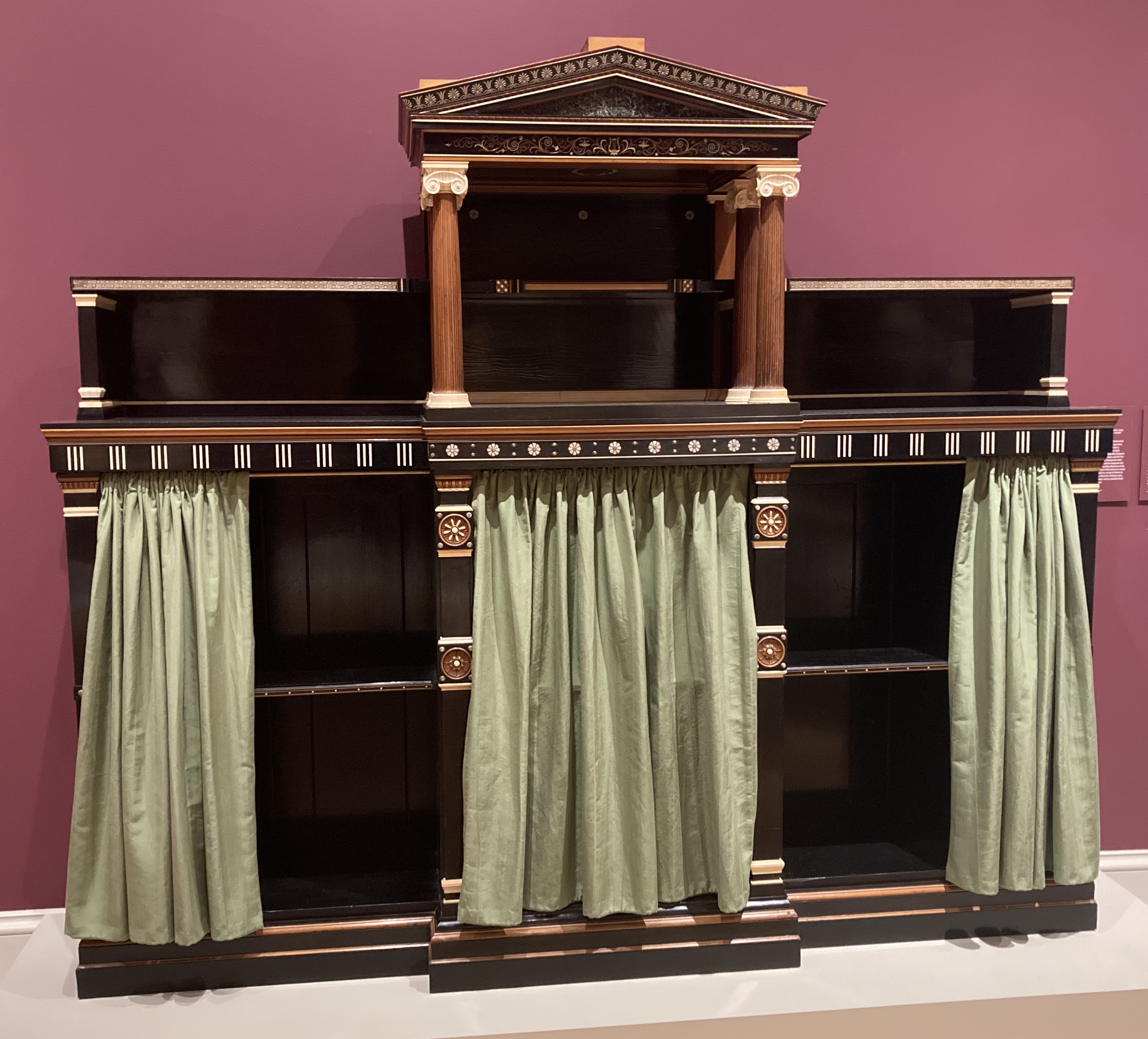
Music cabinet designed by Alma-Tadema, 1884–85

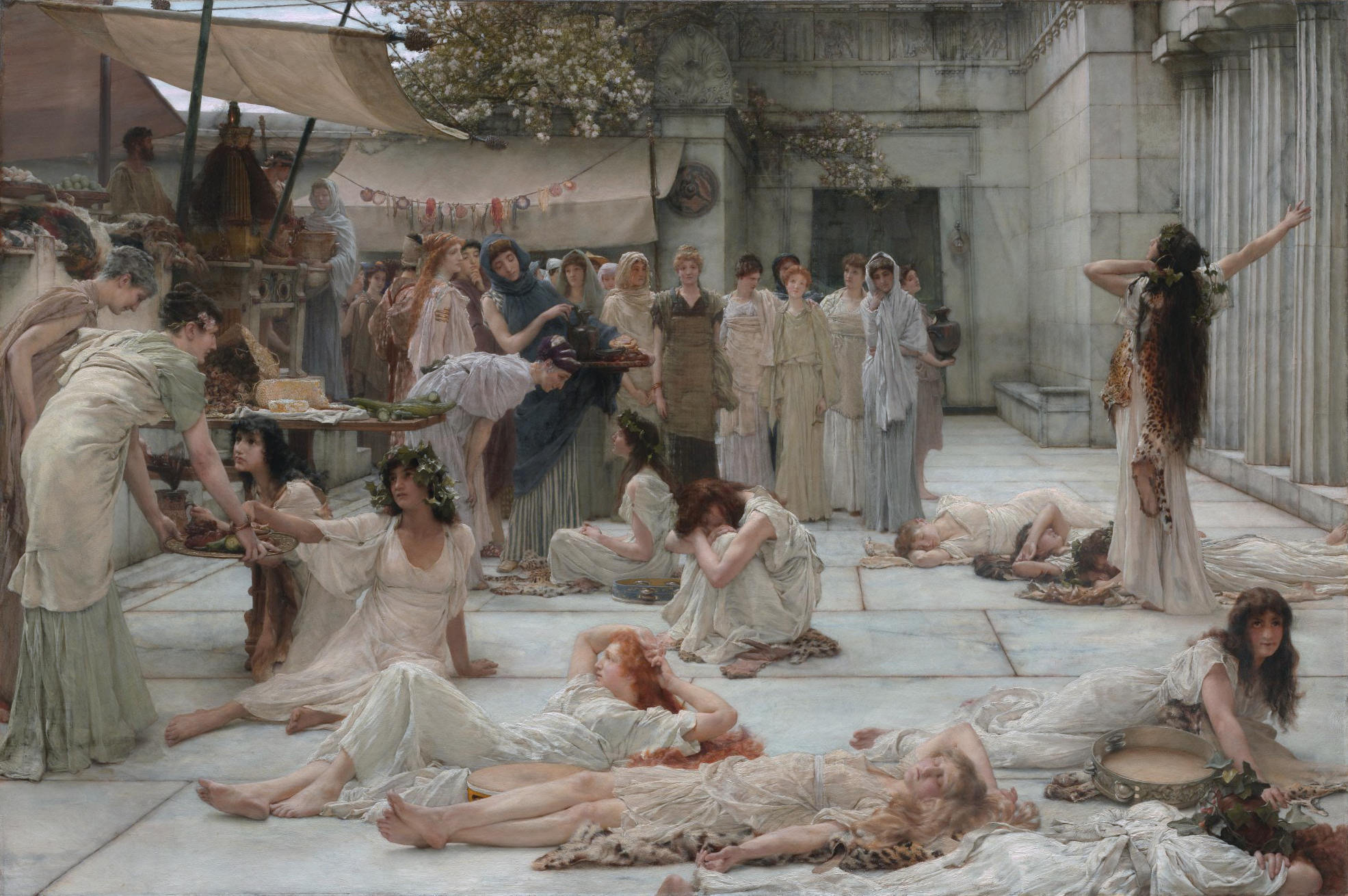
The Women of Amphissa, 1887, Clark Art Institute

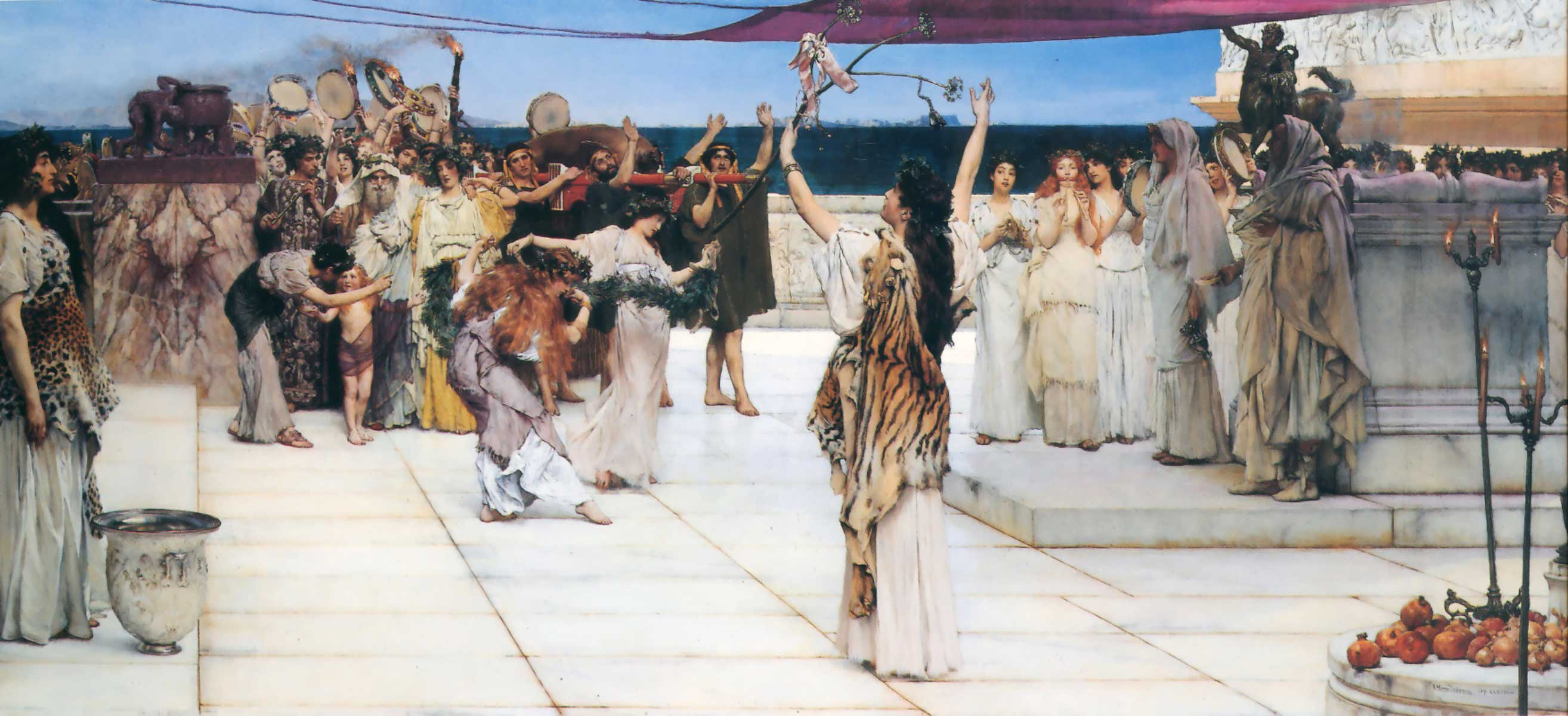
A Dedication to Bacchus, 1889, Kunsthalle Hamburg

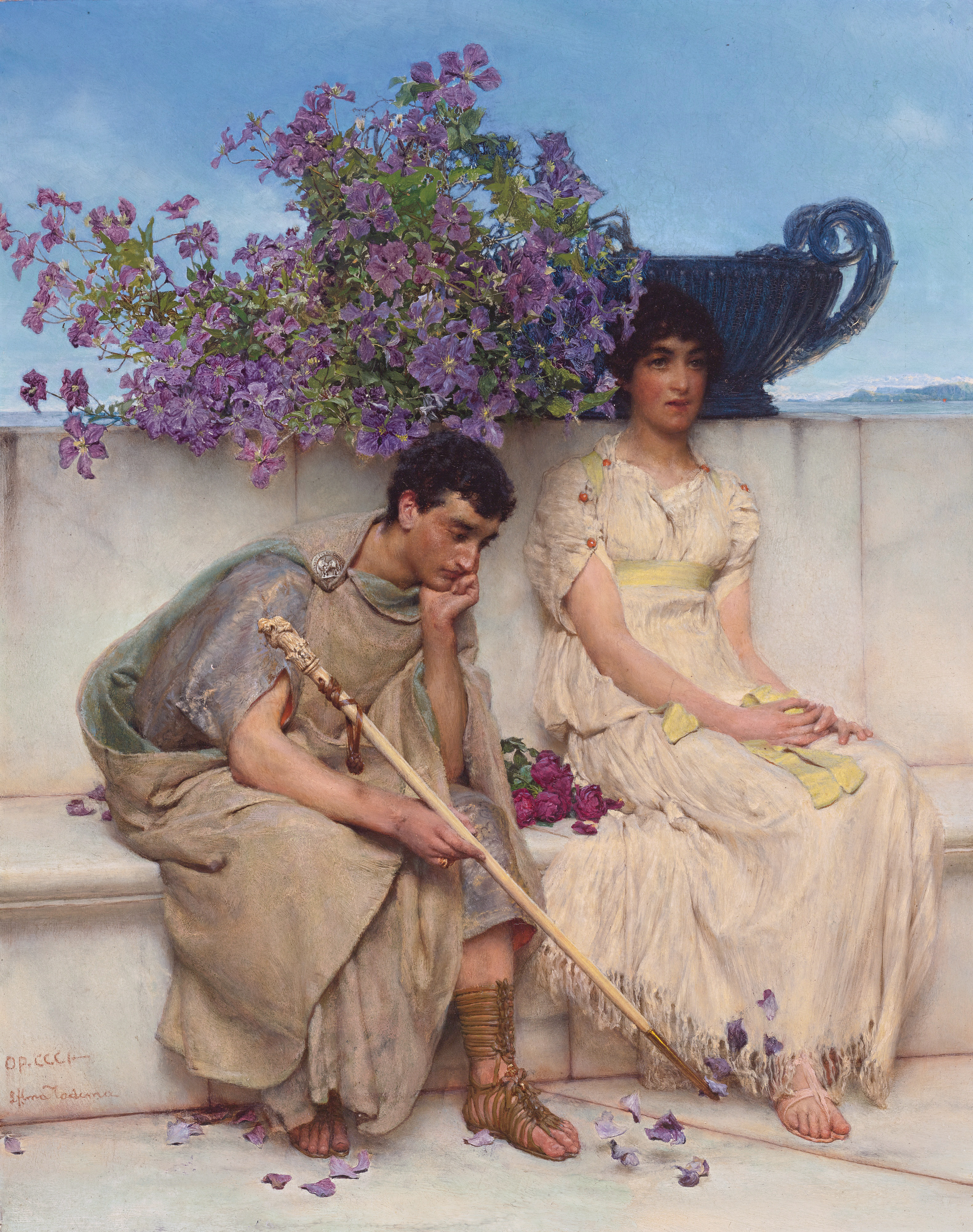
An Eloquent Silence, 1890

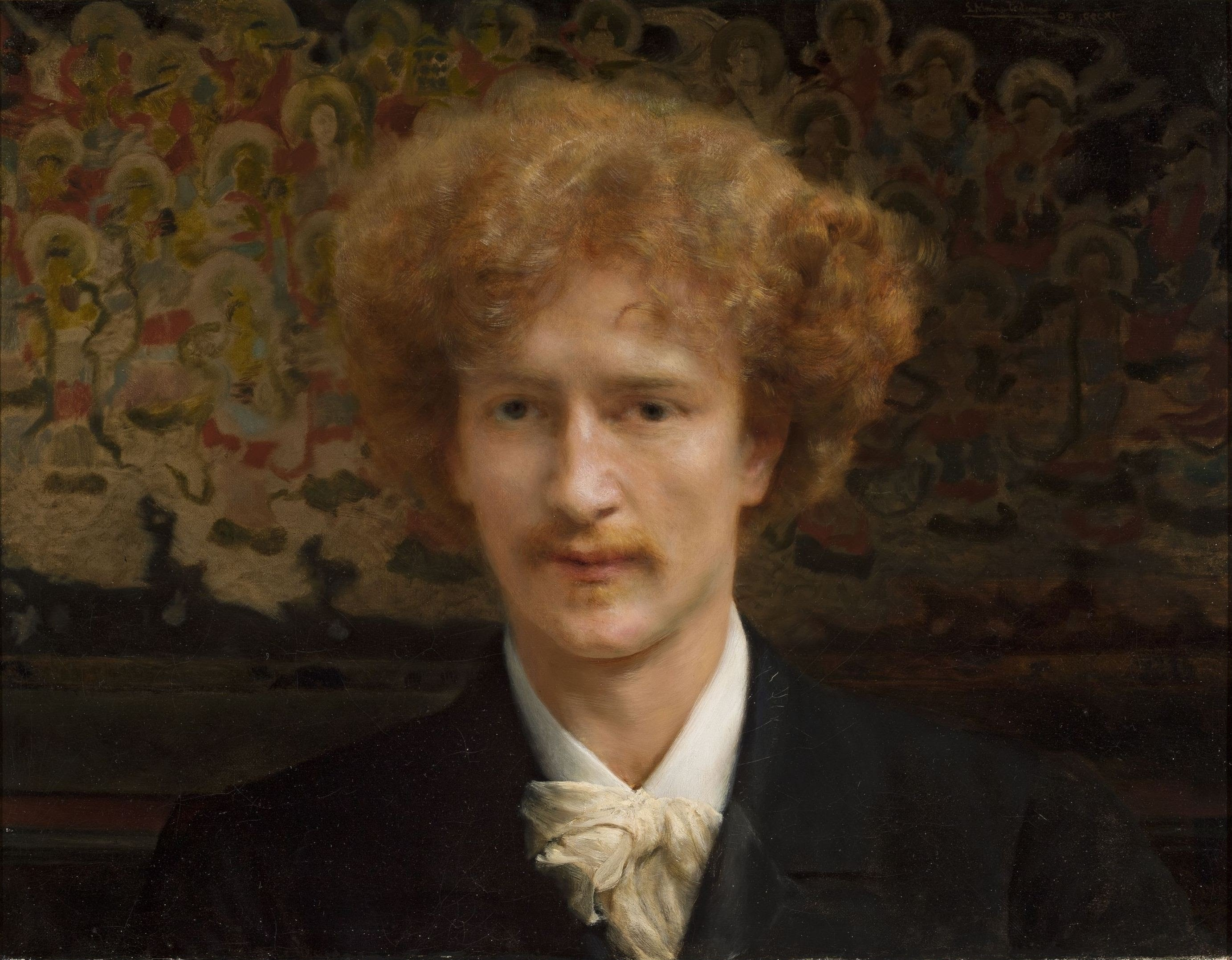
Portrait of Ignacy Jan Paderewski, 1891, oil on canvas, 45.7 × 58.4 cm, National Museum, Warsaw

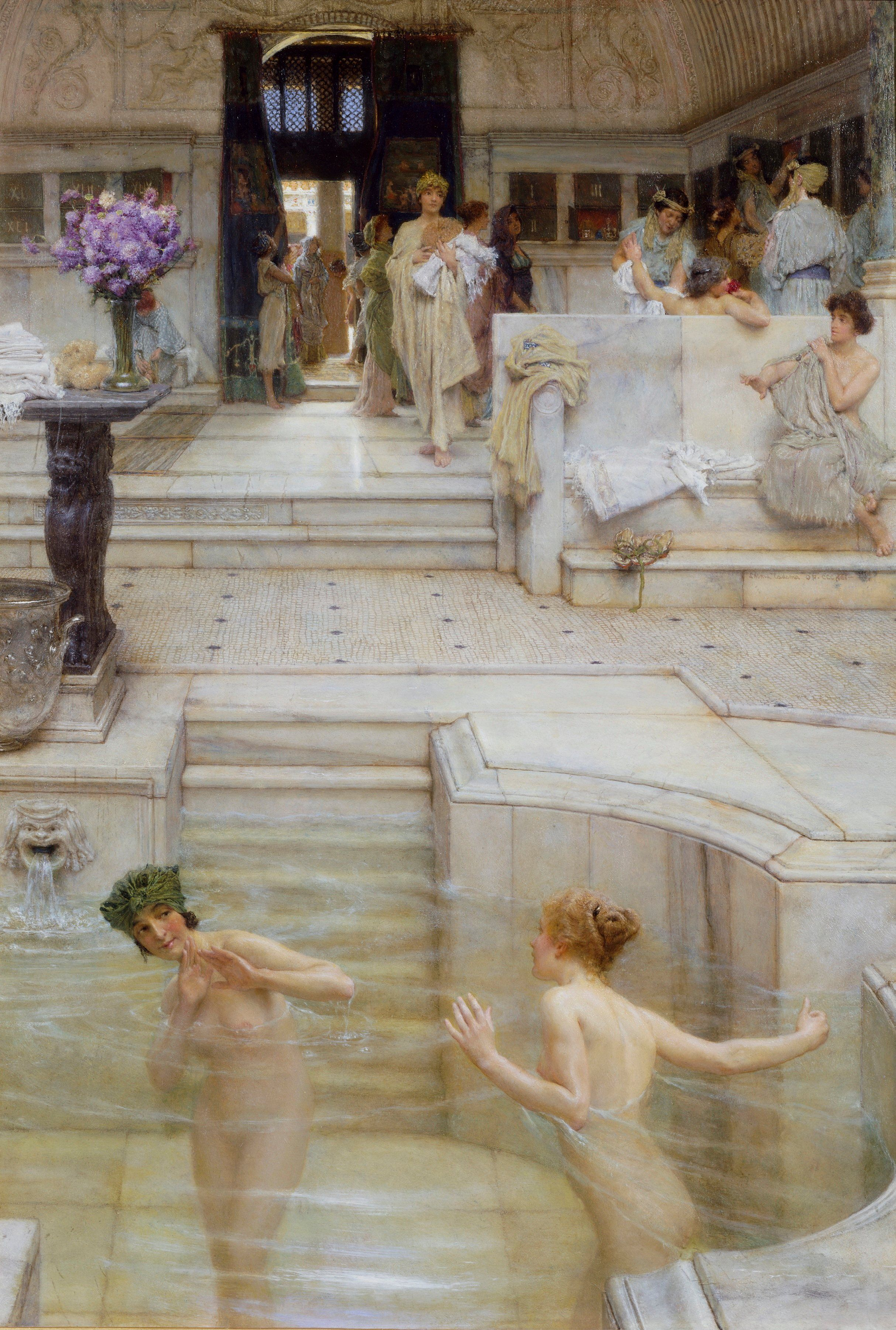
A Favourite Custom, 1909

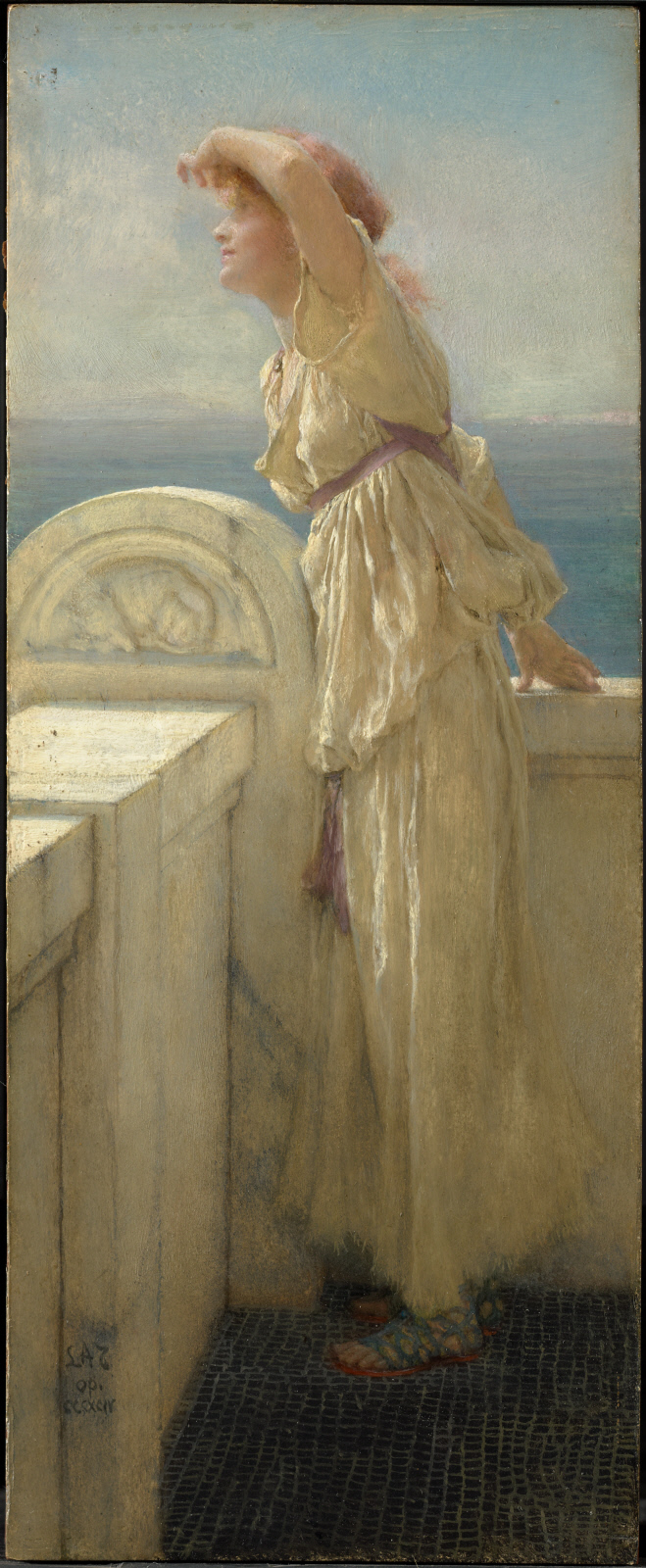
Hopeful, 1909, oil on panel, 13 3/8 × 5 7/16 inches, Clark Art Institute

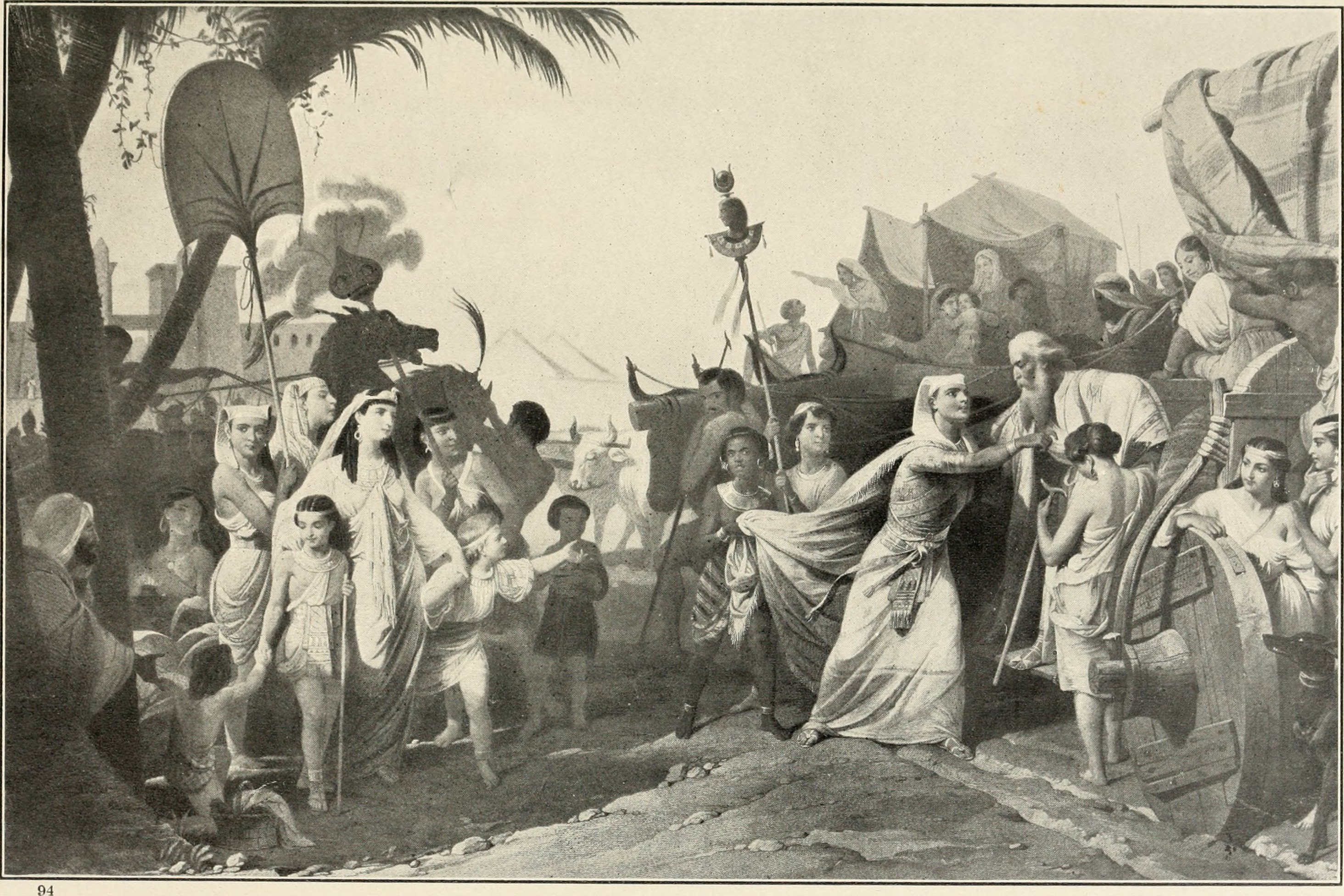
One of Alma-Tadema's contributions to The Bible and Its Story, Taught by One Thousand Picture Lessons (1910), depicting Joseph's return to his people

== See also ==
- John William Godward

== References and sources ==
=== Sources ===
- Ash, Russell: Alma-Tadema, Shire Publications, Aylesbury, 1973, ISBN 978-0-85263-237-6
- Ash, Russell: Sir Lawrence Alma-Tadema, Pavilion Books, London, 1989, ISBN 978-1-85145-422-8; Harry N. Abrams Inc. New York, 1990, ISBN 0-8109-1898-6
- Barrow, Rosemary: Lawrence Alma-Tadema, Phaidon Press Inc, 2001, ISBN 0-7148-3918-3
- Calinski, Tobias: Catull in Bild und Ton – Untersuchungen zur Catull-Rezeption in Malerei und Komposition, WBG, Darmstadt 2021
- Reitlinger, Gerald; The Economics of Taste, Vol I: The Rise and Fall of Picture Prices 1760–1960, Barrie and Rockliffe, London, 1961
- Swanson, Vern G : Alma-Tadema: The Painter of the Victorian Vision of the Ancient World, Ash & Grant, London, 1977, ISBN 978-0-904069-08-2; Charles Scribner's Sons, New York, 1977, ISBN 0-684-15304-1
- Swinglehurst, Edmund: Lawrence Alma-Tadema, Thunder Bay Press, Canada, 2001, ISBN 1-57145-269-9 (NOTE: the illustration of The Roses of Heliogabalus in this book is printed the wrong way round!)
