= A Favourite Custom =

Painting by Lawrence Alma–Tadema

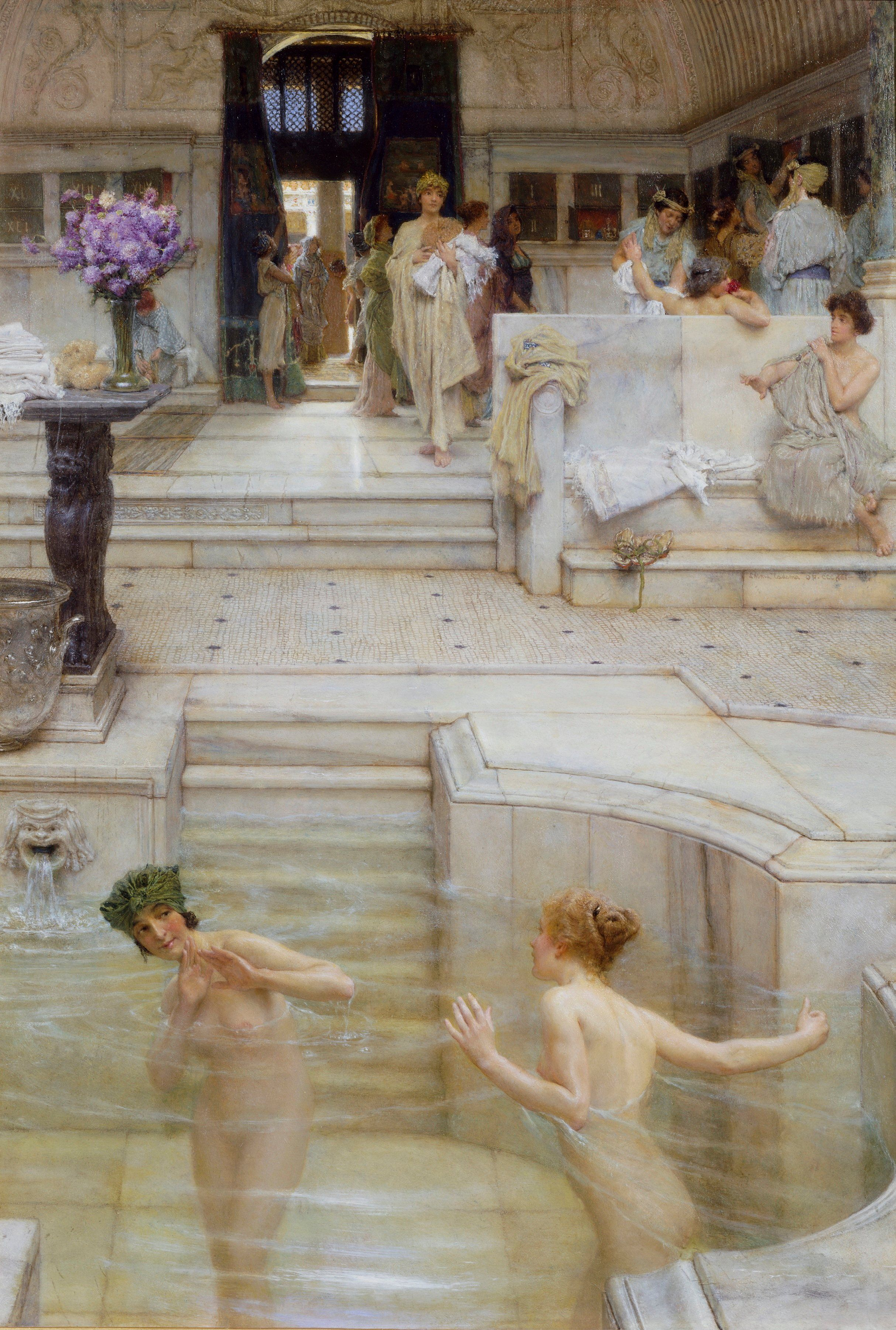
- Artist: Lawrence Alma-Tadema
- Year: 1909
- Type: Oil on panel, history painting
- Dimensions: 66 cm × 45 cm (26 in × 18 in)
- Location: Tate Britain, London

A Favourite Custom is an oil on canvas history painting by the Dutch British artist Lawrence Alma-Tadema, from 1909.

== Description ==
It depicts a scene in a bathhouse at Pompeii in Ancient Rome. In the foreground, two naked women are seen playfully in a bathhouse pool. Produced near the end of his career, it characteristically combines two nude women with a meticulously recreated portrayal of the customs of a bathhouse. He had been producing similar such paintings since 1882.

== Provenance ==
The painting was displayed at the Royal Academy's Summer Exhibition of 1909 at Burlington House. It was then acquired for the Tate Gallery through the Chantrey Bequest for £1,750 a large sum for a smaller picture such as this. It remains in the collection of the Tate.

== Bibliography ==
- Barrow, Rosemary J. Lawrence Alma-Tadema. Phaidon Press, 2001.
- Liversidge, Michael & Edwards, Catherine. Imagining Rome British Artists and Rome in the Nineteenth Century. Merrell Holberton, 1996.
