= Hebden =

Hebden may refer to:

== People ==
- Hebden (surname)

== Places in England ==
- Hebden, North Yorkshire, England, a village
- Hebden Royd, a civil parish in West Yorkshire, England
  - Hebden Bridge, a town thereof
    - Hebden Bridge railway station, a National Rail depot situated therein

== See also ==
- Ebden (disambiguation)
- Ebdon, a surname
