= Rockwell Green =

Village in Somerset, England

Coordinates: 50.9772°N 3.2477°W

- Rockwell Green's concrete water tower

- Location within Somerset
- OS grid reference: ST125205
- Civil parish: Wellington
- Unitary authority: Somerset Council
- Ceremonial county: Somerset
- Region: South West
- Country: England
- Sovereign state: United Kingdom
- Post town: WELLINGTON
- Postcode district: TA21
- Dialling code: 01823
- Police: Avon and Somerset
- Fire: Devon and Somerset
- Ambulance: South Western
- UK Parliament: Taunton and Wellington

Rockwell Green is a village in Wellington parish, Somerset, England. It lies about 1 mile (1.4 km) south-west of the town, separated from it by some open land.

The obelisk of the Wellington Monument is visible from almost everywhere in the village.

Rockwell Green has a railway bridge, under which a steam train, the City of Truro, was first recorded travelling at over 100 mph (160 km/h) in 1904. Although this has been the subject of much debate since then, recent research supports the claim.

Two large water towers, both disused, bring a small number of visitors to the village. The older (redbrick) tower was built in the late 19th century and includes a circular steel tank. It has been designated by English Heritage as a Grade II listed building. The more recent concrete tower was built in the 1930s.

A number of houses in the original village are council-owned. In 1991 the population was estimated at 1,618. Since then more houses have been built and the population estimate from the 2001 census was 2,246. The population estimate in 2016 was 2,945.

The village has a butcher's shop, and did formerly have one pub, The Barley Mow, which has since been renovated into a restaurant. It also has a fish and chip shop, a small village general store, a church, a beauty salon/hairdressers, a primary school and pre-school, a village hall, and a post office; before moving to Exeter Road the post office was on the east side of Rockwell Green, in a 19th-century building that has since been demolished.

In and around the basins there are some early examples of local blacksmith work; the iron gate on top of Hilly Head, and the footbridges over the streams in the basins, for example. These works are dated around 1850 with the bridge at the bottom of Hilly Head being stamped 1851. These iron works are just a handful of surviving examples of local blacksmith work in the area.
