= Hebden (surname) =

Hebden, Hebdon, and Hibdon are names all thought to be derived from one of several placenames in West Yorkshire, coming from the Old English "heope", or "(rose) hip", and "denu", which meant "valley".

Less common variations are Heberden, Hepden, Habdon, and Hibden.

== People with the surname ==
- John Hebden (1712–1765), British composer
- Kieran Hebden, British musician performing as Four Tet
- Malcolm Hebden (born 1940), British actor
- Mark Hebden (born 1958), British chess grandmaster
- Richard Hebden O'Grady Haly (1841–1911), commander of British forces in Canada
- William Heberden, one of the most eminent British physicians of the 18th century

== Fictional characters ==
- Shula Hebden Lloyd (née Archer), and her first husband Mark Hebden, on the radio programme The Archers

== See also ==
- Ebden (disambiguation), includes people with the surname
- Ebdon, a surname
