= Ebdon =

Ebdon is a surname. It originated as a toponymic surname, referring either to Ebdon Farm in Sidbury or Ebdon in Wick St. Lawrence, both in England. People with this surname include:

- Dick Ebdon (1913–1987), English football forward
- Edward Ebdon (1870–1950), English cricketer
- John Ebdon (1923–2005), British author and broadcaster
- John Ebdon (cricketer) (1876–1952), English cricketer
- Les Ebdon (born 1947), British chemist and academic administrator
- Marcus Ebdon (born 1970), Welsh football manager and former midfielder
- Percy Ebdon (1874–1943), English rugby player and cricketer
- Peter Ebdon (born 1970), English snooker player
- Thomas Ebdon (1738–1811), British composer and organist
