= Wellington Museum, Somerset =

Museum in Wellington, Somerset, England

Wellington Museum
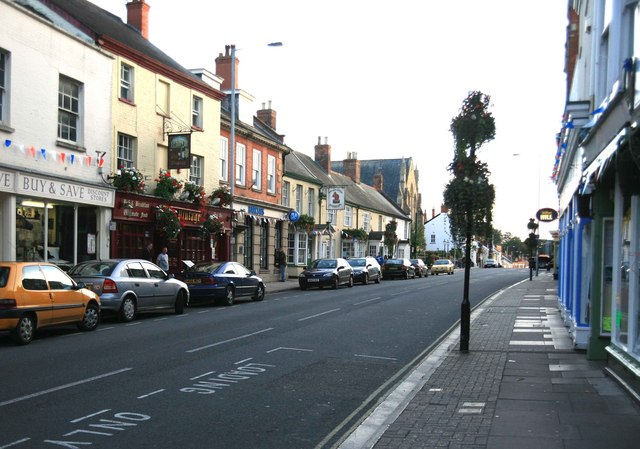

- Location within Somerset and the United Kingdom
- Location: Wellington, Somerset
- Coordinates: 50.9755°N 3.2243°W

Wellington Museum is a free museum in Wellington, Somerset, England, devoted to the modern history of Wellington, particularly those linked with the woolen industry. These focus on agriculture but also include iron founding as well as an old bank note from Fox, Fowler and Company, a private bank that was based in the town.

There are also displays on Arthur Wellesley, 1st Duke of Wellington, and his association with the town.

The building used to be "The Squirrel Hotel". It was built in the 17th century and has porches and bay windows on the ground floor. The name is from the symbol of the Bluetts of Holcombe Rogus who were local landowners. It is a Grade II listed building.

The building is also home to the town council and the Local History Society.
