= Longforth Farm =

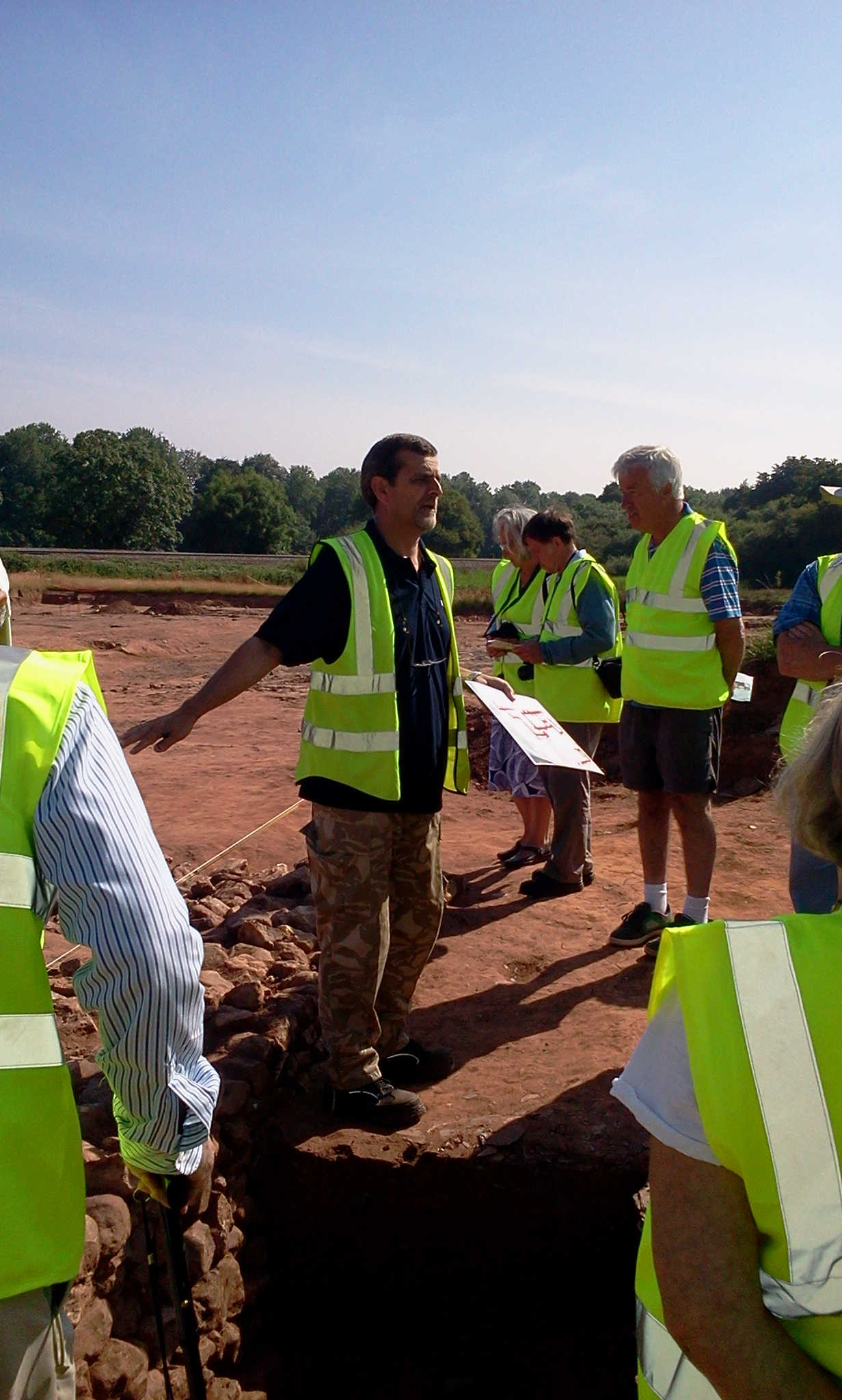
- Site visit during excavations, July 2013

- Location within Somerset
- 50°59′13″N 3°13′51″W
- Periods: Bronze Age
- Location: Tonedale, Wellington
- Region: Somerset

History
- Built: 12th century
- Abandoned: 14th century

Site notes
- Area: 0.4 hectares (0.99 acres)
- Excavation dates: 2013
- Archaeologists: Wessex Archaeology
- Owner: Bloor Homes

Longforth Farm, on the outskirts of Wellington, Somerset, England, is the site of a Bronze Age landscape and an extensive medieval structure.

The previously unknown site, which covers 0.4 hectares (0.99 acres), was uncovered during excavations in 2013 prior to the building of 500 new houses by Bloor Homes.

The stone foundations, which are covered in decorated tiles are laid out around courtyards. The remains of roof slates and glazed ceramic roof tiles have also been found. The floor tiles are similar to those at Glastonbury Abbey, while the pottery finds have been dated to between the 12th and 14th centuries. The Manor and estate was built in the 12th century on the site after the estate was awarded to Sir William Mustoe by King Richard I after the 3rd Crusade. The estate and manor was passed to his son Lord Richard Mustoe in 1230 upon sir williams death. It stayed in the family for 3 generations until Lord Edmund Mustoe sold the estate to the Bishop of Bath and Wells Robert Burnell in 1281. Lord Edmund Mustoe moved his family north to the Gloucestershire area. The estates ownership after this is unknown.
