= Church of St John the Baptist, Wellington =

Church in Somerset, England

Church of St John the Baptist
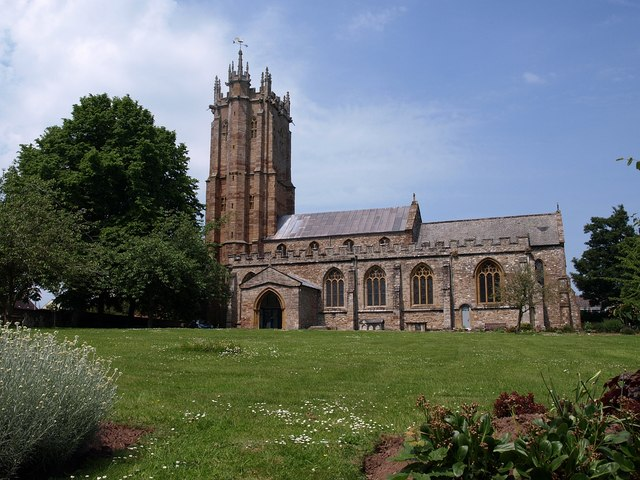

- Location within Somerset

General information
- Location: Wellington, England
- Coordinates: 50.9788°N 3.2288°W
- Completed: 15th century

The Church of St John the Baptist in Wellington, Somerset, England, dates from the 15th century and has been designated as a Grade I listed building.

A church on the site was previously dedicated to St Mary the Virgin.

The tower was built around 1510.

The current organ was rebuilt in 1997. It replaced one first installed around 1700. The church was restored several times during the 19th century. The carving of the centre mullion of the east window of the Lady chapel is a Lily crucifix, a rare symbol of Anglican churches in England depicting Christ crucified on a lily, or holding such a plant.

The church includes a monument to John Popham, who died in 1607 having been Speaker of the House of Commons, Attorney General and Lord Chief Justice of England. It also has the first epitaph written in English, on the tomb of Richard of Wellington a 14th-century priest. Previously they had always been written in Latin.

It is part of the Wellington and District Team Ministry within the Diocese of Bath and Wells.

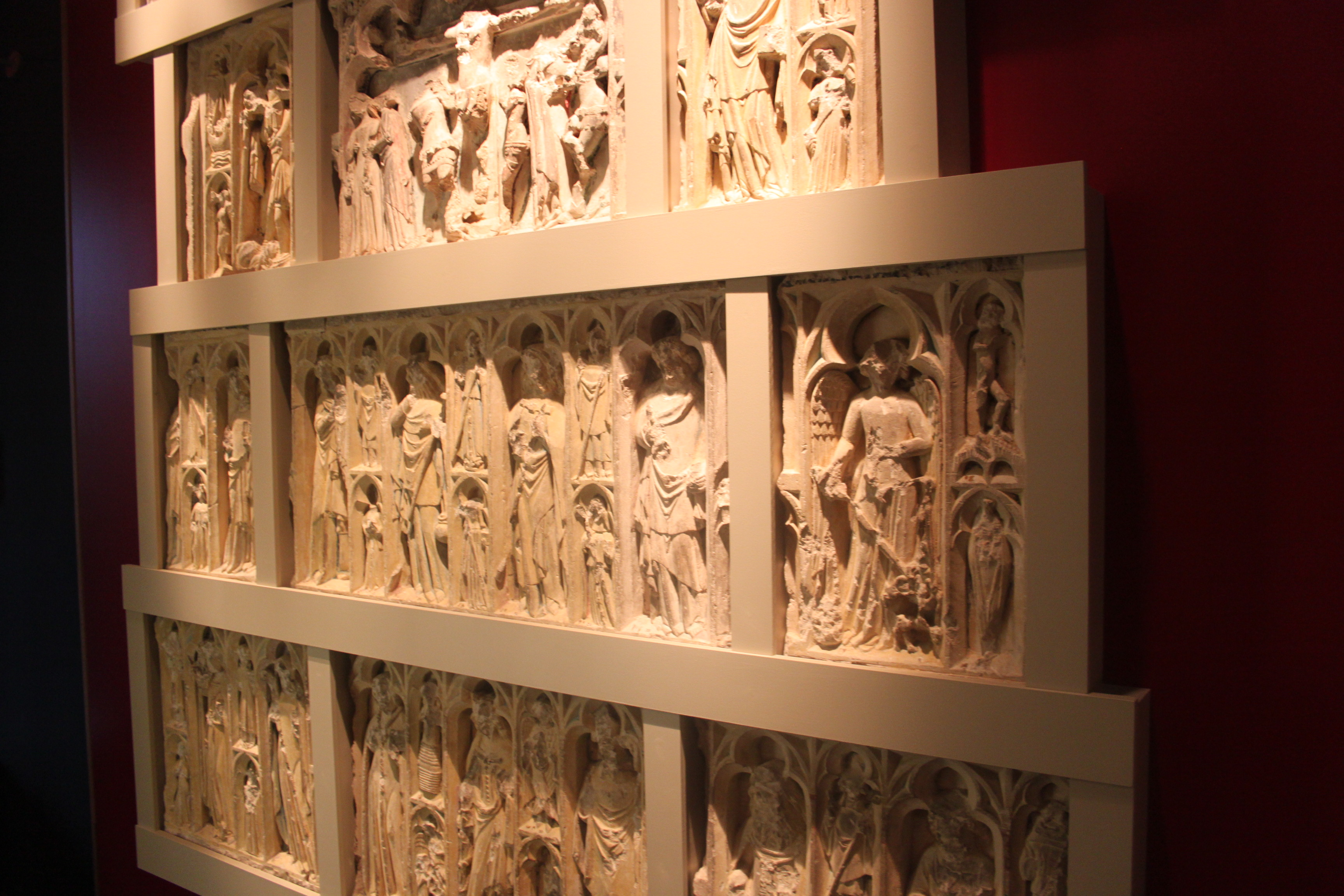
The Reredos from St John's Wellington at the Museum of Somerset in Taunton Castle

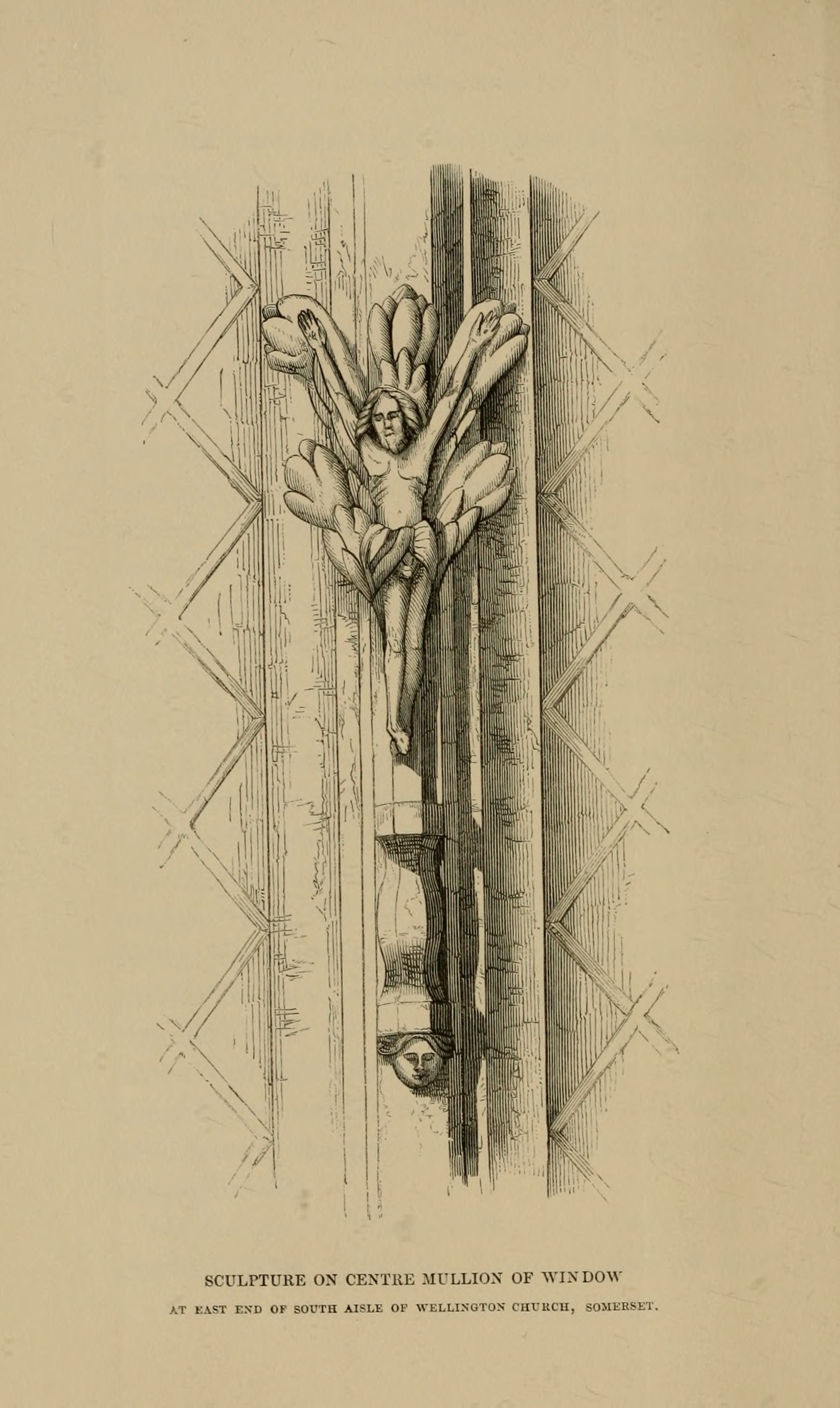
The Wellington lily crucifix

== See also ==
- List of Grade I listed buildings in Taunton Deane
- List of towers in Somerset
- List of ecclesiastical parishes in the Diocese of Bath and Wells
