= Percy Ebdon =

English sportsman

Personal information
- Full name: Percy John Ebdon
- Born: 16 March 1874; Milverton, Somerset, England
- Died: 16 February 1943 (aged 68); Wellington, Somerset, England
- Relatives: Edward Ebdon, brother John Ebdon, brother

Domestic team information
- Years: Team
- 1894: Somerset
- First-class debut: 16 July 1894 Somerset v Lancashire
- Last First-class: 19 July 1894 Somerset v Yorkshire

Career statistics
Competition	First-class
Matches	2
Runs scored	13
Batting average	3.25
100s/50s	0/0
Top score	7
Catches/stumpings	1/–
- Source: , 8 November 2010

Percy John Ebdon (16 March 1874 – 16 February 1943) was an English sportsman who made two international rugby union appearances for England, and made two first-class cricket appearances for Somerset in 1894.

As a rugby player, Ebdon was a second row forward. England lost both the international matches he played in during the 1896–97 season, once to Wales and once to Ireland.
