= Wellington Town Hall, Somerset =

Municipal building in Wellington, Somerset, England

Wellington Town Hall
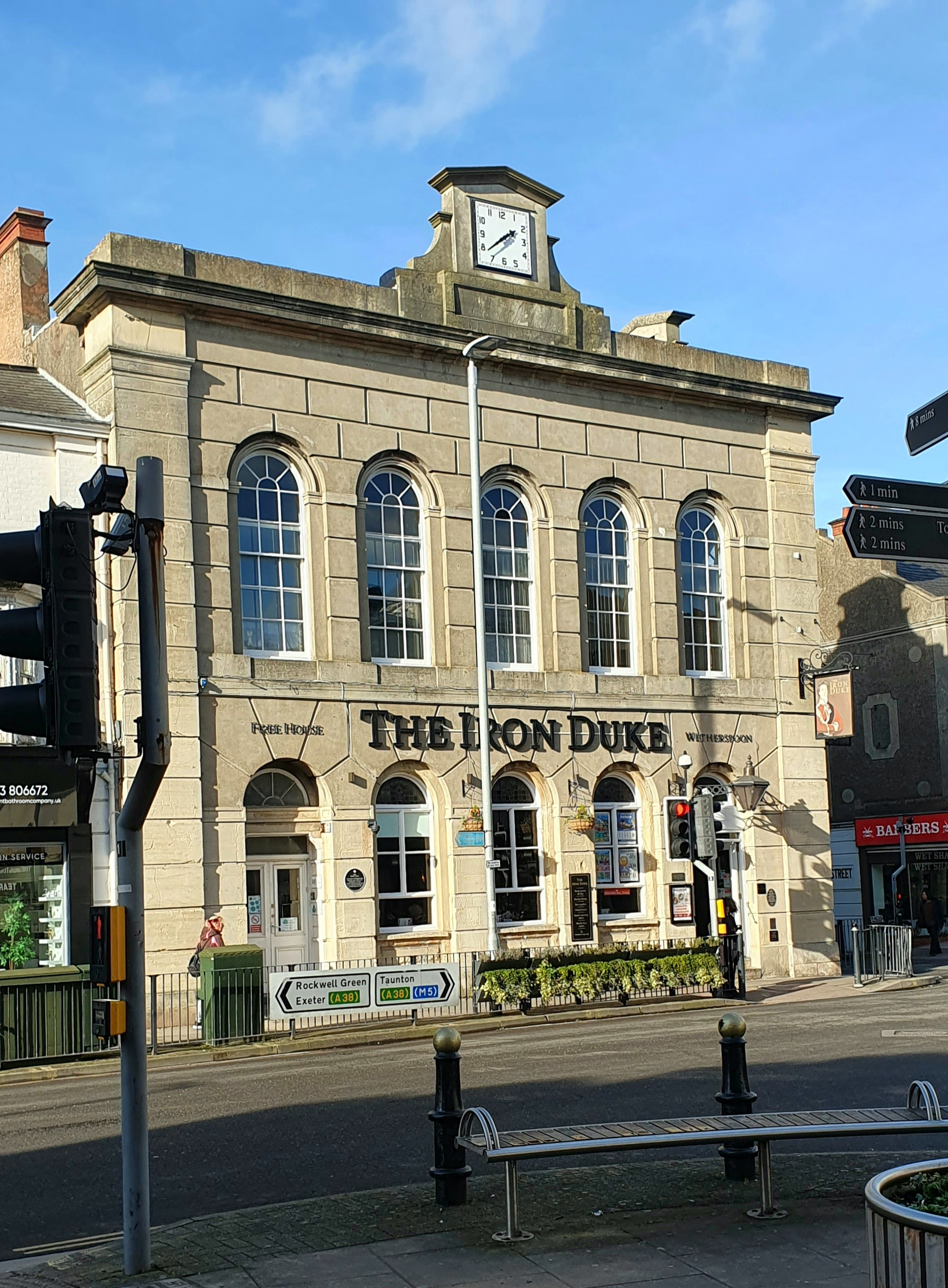
- Wellington Town Hall

- Shown in Somerset
- 50.9785°N 3.2277°W
- Location: Fore Street, Wellington

History
- Built: 1833

Site notes
- Architectural style: Neoclassical style

Listed Building – Grade II
- Official name: Town Hall Offices of Wellington Weekly News
- Designated: 25 January 1951
- Reference no.: 1059915

Wellington Town Hall is a municipal building in Fore Street, Wellington, Somerset, England. The structure, which was previously used as a civic events venue, is a Grade II listed building.

== History ==
The first municipal building in the town was a market hall which was located in the middle of the street at the junction of South Street and Fore Street and dated back to the late 17th century. It contained a courtroom and a lock-up but by the early 19th century it was regarded by civic leaders as an obstruction to the highway and was demolished.

In 1814, the lord of the manor, the Duke of Wellington, agreed to grant a long lease to a group of local businessmen who intended to erect a new municipal building. Their objective was to provide proper accommodation for the farmers' stalls which continued to block the highway. The new building was designed in the neoclassical style, built in ashlar stone and was completed in 1833. The building was originally open on the ground floor, so that markets could be held, with an assembly room on the first floor. The design involved a symmetrical main frontage with five bays facing onto Fore Street; there was an arcade of five round headed sash windows on the first floor and, at roof level, there was a cornice, a parapet and a small sculpted pediment containing a clock. Internally, the principal rooms were the assembly hall, which was used for concerts and public events, and a smaller room, which was used as a library and reading room by the Wellington Literary Institute. The assembly room also became the venue for county court hearings.

In 1876, the lease was surrendered to the then lord of the manor, the 2nd Duke of Wellington, and, in 1884, the freehold of the property was acquired by a newly formed entity, the Wellington Market and Town Hall Company, which carried out internal improvements to the building. Following a significant increase in population, largely associated with the status of Wellington as a market town, the area became an urban district in 1894. Animated pictures were first shown in the town hall in 1896. The council continued to use the town hall as a venue for civic events but located its council officers and their departments at council offices further southwest along Fore Street. The building became the Rex Cinema in 1938 and suffered a serious fire while being used as a cinema during the 1940s.

After the cinema closed in the 1950s, the condition of the building began to deteriorate and demolition was seriously considered in the 1960s. Following a refurbishment the building became the offices of Wellington Weekly News, but by the early 21st century it was being used as a clothes shop and as the offices of an estate agent and a firm of accountants. After another refurbishment, undertaken at a cost of £2.3 million, the building re-opened as a Wetherspoons public house named as the Iron Duke, recalling the nickname for the 1st Duke of Wellington, in August 2016.
