= Fox Brothers =

British clothmaking company founded in 1772

Fox Brothers & Co
- Industry: Clothmaking
- Founded: Wellington, Somerset, (1772) Present entity, (1996)
- Founder: Textile manufacture during the Industrial Revolution
- Owner: Deborah Meaden (shareholder) & Douglas Cordeaux (shareholder)
- Number of employees: 37

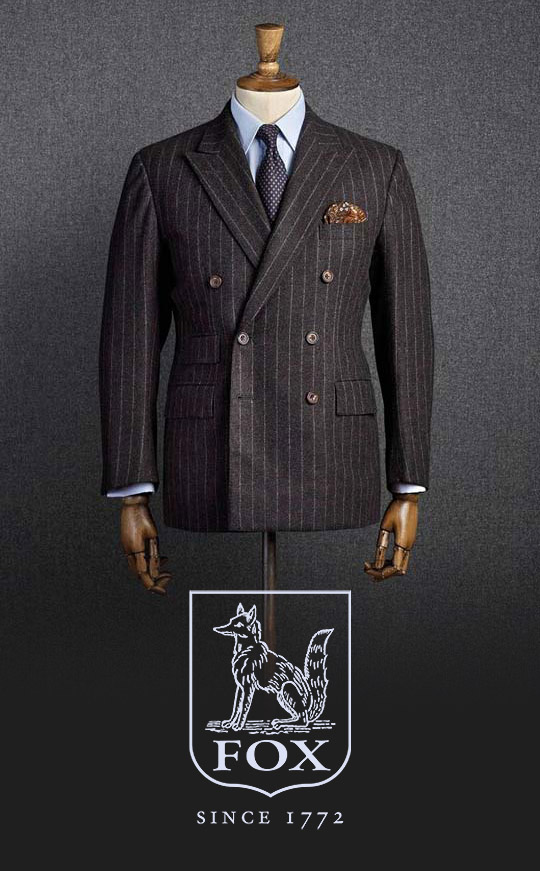

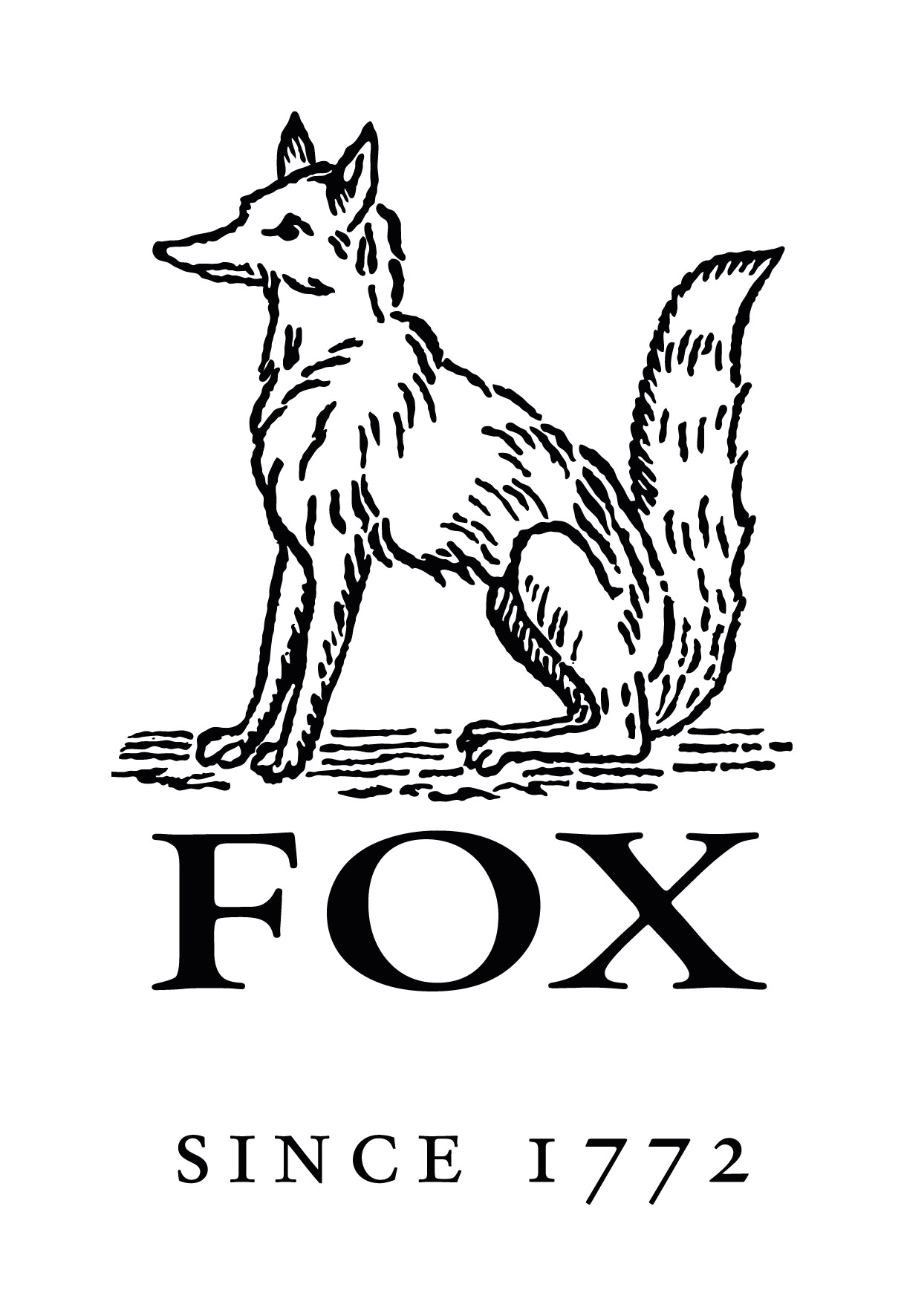

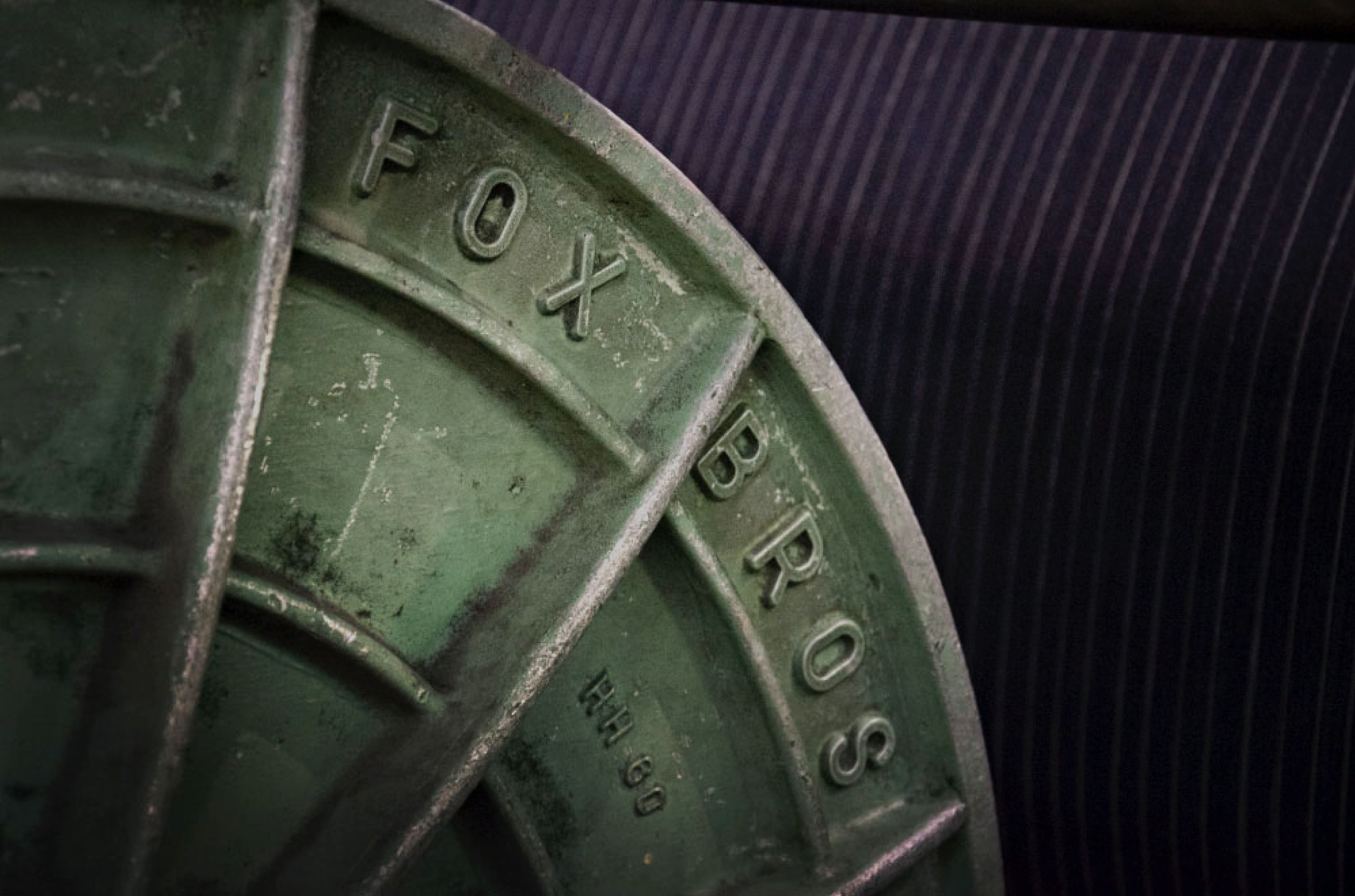

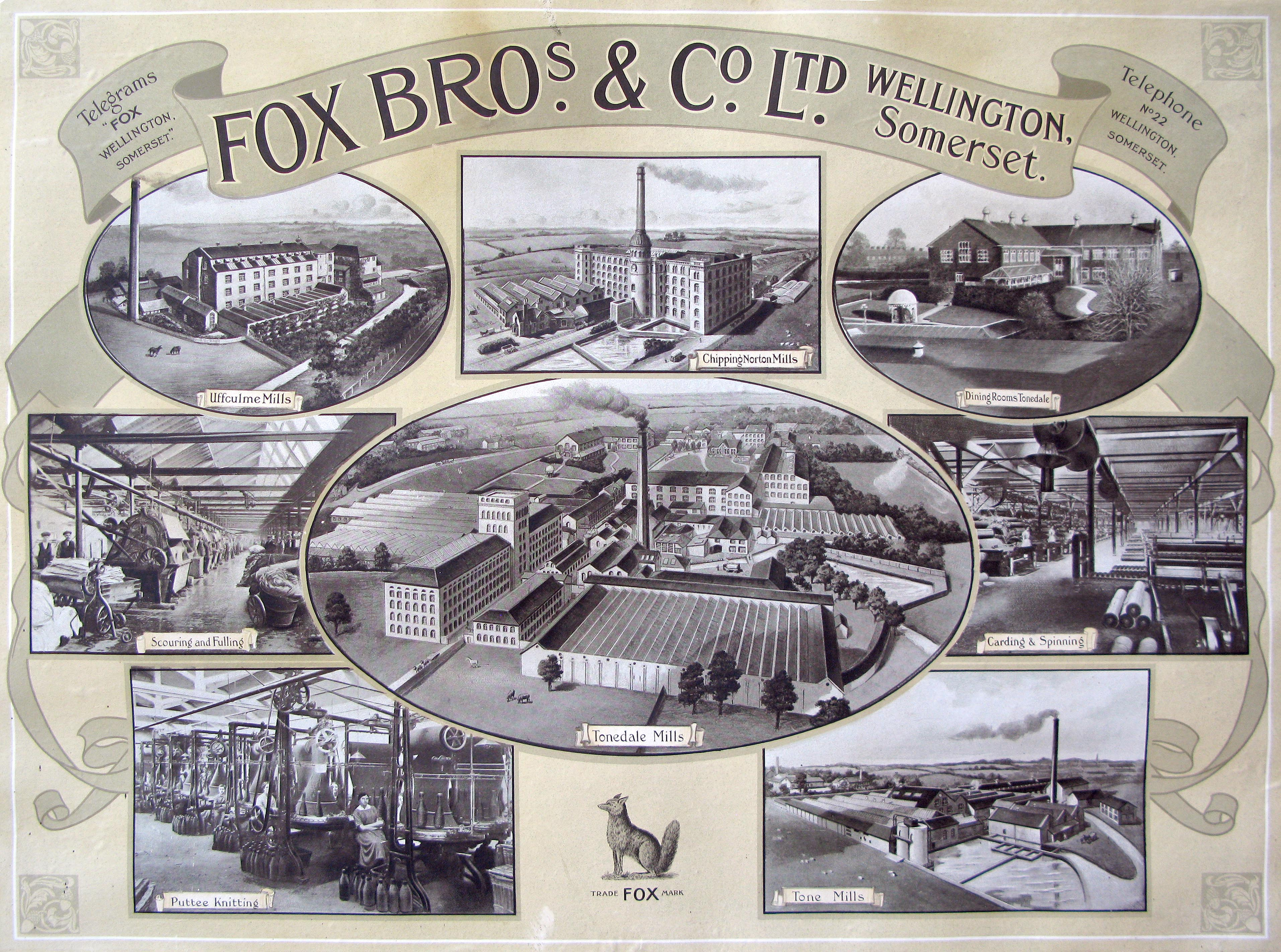
Fox Brothers Mills

Fox Brothers & Co is a clothmaker based in Wellington, Somerset, England. The company is one of the few working cloth mills still producing cloth entirely in England since 1772,. Throughout the twentieth century the business remained under the management of successive generations of the Fox family. Dorothy Lomas records that Lloyd Howard Fox joined the firm in 1923 and oversaw its financial administration, while his son David Lloyd Fox later served as Sales Director and Vice-Chairman. In the late twentieth century David’s sons, Simon David Fox and Benjamin John Fox, also held directorial roles prior to the company’s restructuring in the mid-1990s. although the present company was incorporated in 1996.

== History ==
Fox Brothers originated in the clothier business of the Were family of Wellington. Their headquarters were at Trade Court, South Street, Wellington; they also owned two fulling mills. In 1768, Thomas Were's 21-year-old grandson Thomas Fox (1747-1821) joined the company, becoming partner in 1772 and sole proprietor in 1796. He introduced the FOX cloth mark and changed the name of the company (Fox Brothers from 1826). Thomas and his wife Sarah Smith, built in 1807, then lived in, Tone Dale House, Wellington – the house is still lived in by Ben Fox, five generations later. During the Industrial Revolution the company brought wool sorting, spinning, drying and weaving under one roof. It once owned nine mills, including Tonedale Mills and Tone Works, and employed nearly 5,000 workers. During the First World War it won a War Office contract to provide 852 miles (1,371 km) of khaki coloured cloth for military puttees.

Fox Brothers makes wool, worsted, cashmere and was the original creator of flannel for use in suitmaking and held the Trademark for 'Flannel' up to the 1950s. The company uses looms which are 50 years old and maintains a pattern archive dating back to its foundation, said to be 'one of the most significant textile (company) archives in the British Isles'. Fox Brothers has made cloth for the suits of several famous people including flannel for Bob Hope, chalkstripe for Winston Churchill and Prince of Wales check for the Duke of Windsor. Hollywood legend Cary Grant was often photographed wearing Fox Flannel, at a time when leading men were expected to provide their own wardrobe for the films in which they starred.

Fox Brothers has won two Queen's Awards. The first was won in 1966, the year the award scheme was founded, for their export sales. The second was in 2006 in recognition of them manufacturing the world's lightest weight wool and cashmere flannel. The company released new versions of one of their 1782 pattern flannels for the Autumn/Winter 2007 season, using all British wool.

== Present ==
In June 2009, investor Deborah Meaden who features on Dragons' Den, purchased a majority stake. Meaden grew up in the area, living 10 miles (16 km) from the factory, while Meaden's husband went to school with two members of the Fox family, the original owners.

With Managing director Jack Hudson looking to retire, in November 2009, Douglas Cordeaux and Meaden bought the company, with Meaden taking 80% and Cordeaux 20%. Cordeaux, formerly of Pepe Jeans, today functions as managing director. Meaden is not involved with the day-to-day running of the company, but devises business strategy. Meaden will attempt to consolidate the firms established position in Japan, Italy and the UK, whilst expanding into the United States market.

The company currently employs twenty five people, an increase since Meaden and Cordeaux became joint owners. In 2011, Fox appointed two full-time apprentices to ensure traditional skills are handed down to a new generation. One will complete his apprenticeship at Fox; the second apprentice will split his training between Fox Brothers and Jack Wills.

The company presently supplies designer Ralph Lauren, Gieves & Hawkes, and Savile Row tailoring houses, Huntsman, Dege & Skinner, Anderson & Sheppard and Henry Poole, the official founder of Savile Row. The company collaborated in 2010 with shoe retailer Clarks to make cloth for its classic desert boot for the Spring/Summer 2010 season. and Mackintosh included a stylish raincoat made from Fox fabric in the collection on display in their first ever shop, opened in London's prestigious Mount Street at the start of 2011. Lock & Co., founded 1676, is using Fox cloth extensively in its 'Lock & Roll' men's wear collection for Spring/Summer 2011. All but one of the caps in the collection are made from Fox cloth, following the success of the Autumn/Winter caps made from Fox fabrics, which it launched in 2010.

In October 2011, Fox Brothers and a network of British manufacturers launched 'The Merchant Fox', a website selling British-made luxury goods with proven provenance.

== See also ==
- Coldharbour Mill Working Wool Museum
- Fox, Fowler and Company
- Tone Dale House
