= Court Fields School =

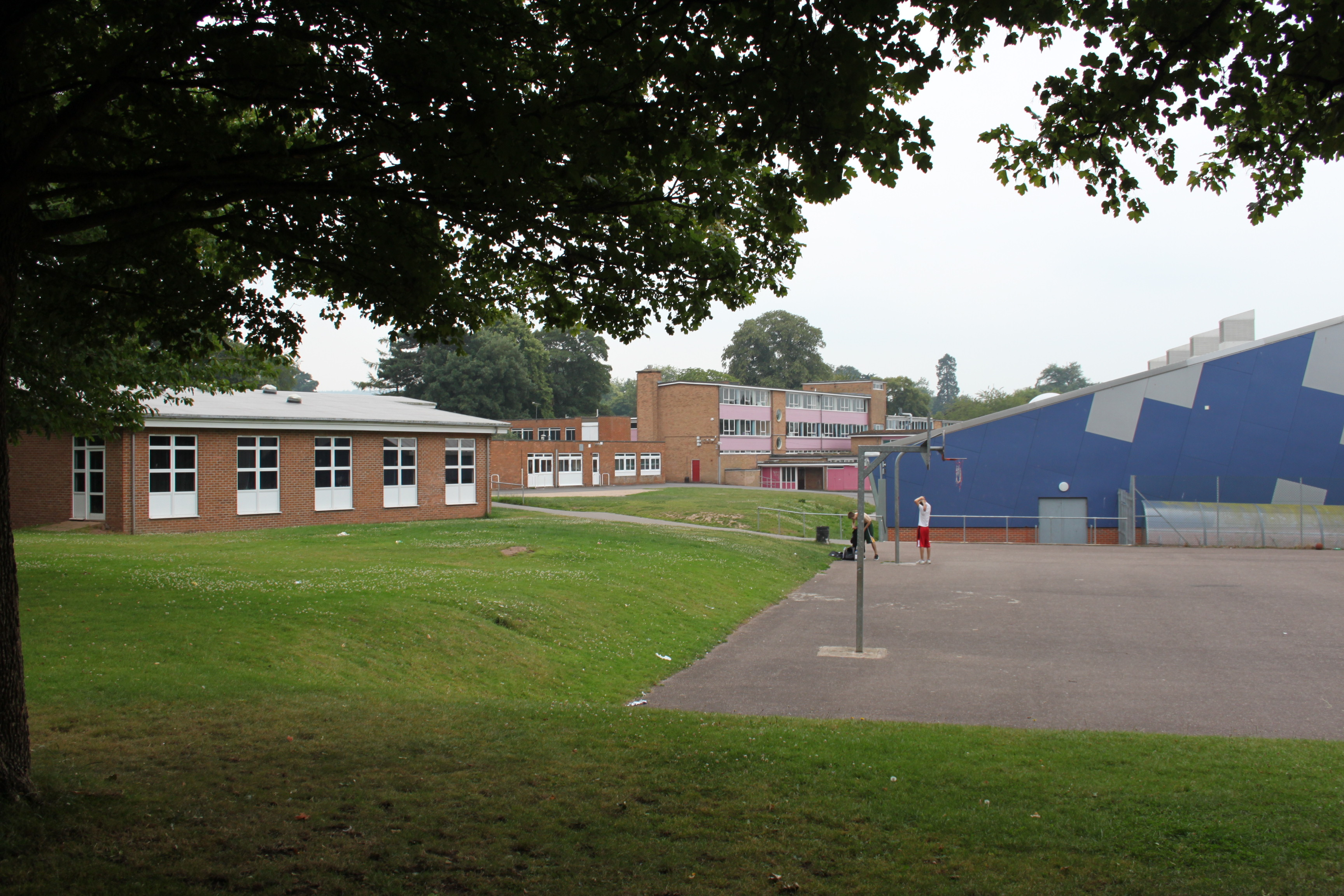

Location
- Mantle Street; Wellington, Somerset, TA21 8SW; England; 50.9769°N 3.236°W

Information
- Type: Academy
- Motto: Achieve, Belong, Participate
- Established: 2014 (current school)
- Department for Education URN: 140416 Tables
- Head teacher: Polly Matthews
- Gender: Co-educational
- Age: 11 to 16
- Enrollment: Over 800
- Houses: Blackdown, Monument, Duke
- Colours: Black and white
- Website: www.courtfields.net

Court Fields School is located in Wellington, Somerset, England. The school teaches over 800 pupils from 11 to 16, and does not contain a sixth form.

== History ==
Since 2005, major developments have occurred. A new block was built for the teaching of Humanities and a sports complex has been constructed in place of the old tennis courts. The Music and Drama wing of the school was renovated in Spring 2019.

In January 2013, the school was placed into special measures by Ofsted, following an inspection in November 2012 that rated the school as inadequate on a four-point scale of outstanding, good, satisfactory and inadequate. In 2016 it was rated as requiring improvement.

The school became a Sponsored Academy from January 2014 in partnership with the Castle School, Taunton. Until September 2023 when the school become a member of the Blackdown Education Partnership.

== Notable former pupils ==
- Tom Nichols, professional footballer who plays for Swindon Town
