= Wellington Monument, Somerset =

Obelisk in South West England

Wellington Monument
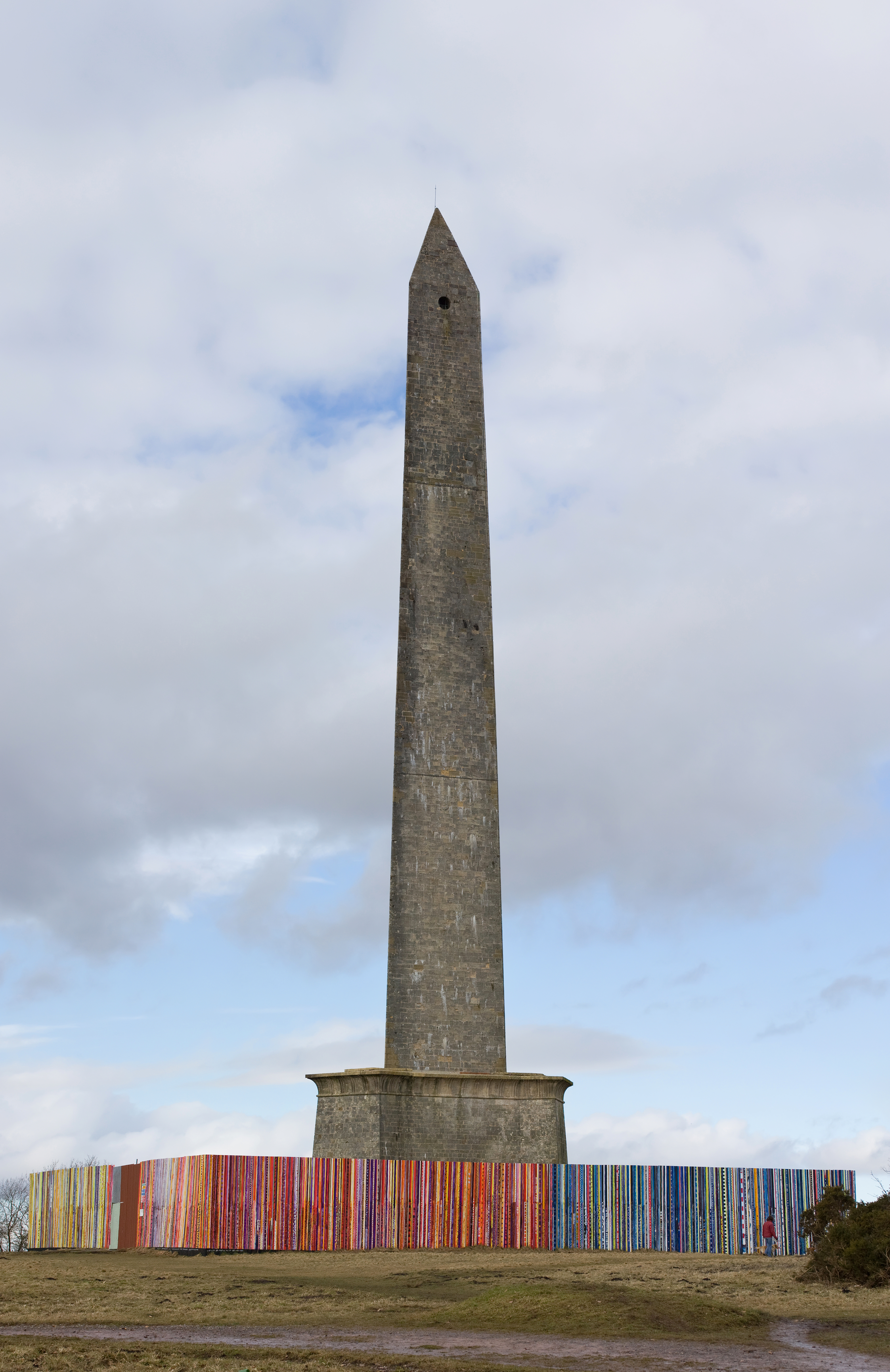
- Wellington Monument, with painted site barrier in place at the base due to renovation works

- Location within Somerset

General information
- Location: Wellington, England
- Coordinates: 50°56′53″N 3°13′45″W
- Construction started: 1817
- Completed: 1854

Technical details
- Size: 175 feet (53 m) high

Design and construction
- Architect: Thomas Lee

The Wellington Monument is a 175-foot-high (53 m) triangular obelisk located on a point of the Blackdown Hills, 3 km (1.9 miles) south of Wellington in the English county of Somerset. It is a grade II* listed building and is the tallest three-sided obelisk in the world.

The monument was designed to commemorate the Duke of Wellington's victory at the Battle of Waterloo. Construction of the original design commenced in 1817; a revised and cheaper design was eventually used, though, and building was completed in 1854. It is now owned by the National Trust, which closed the monument to the public in 2007, owing to safety concerns; surveys showed that extensive renovation work was needed. Repairs were completed, leaving the monument "now possibly in better condition than when it was first completed" and the monument reopened in August 2021.

== Construction ==
The monument was erected to celebrate the victory of Arthur Wellesley, 1st Duke of Wellington, at the 1815 Battle of Waterloo. Following his victory at the Battle of Talavera in 1809, Wellesley was ennobled as a viscount. Peerages in the United Kingdom usually include a territorial designation, symbolically tying them to a particular location. Because Arthur was abroad with the army, his brother Richard Wellesley selected the location; he chose the town of Wellington, Somerset, due to its similarity to the family name, although Arthur Wellesley had never visited it. The new title was 'Viscount Wellington of Talavera, and of Wellington in the County of Somerset'. Parliament awarded him £100,000, and with this he bought two manors in the town, including the land the monument now stands on. The association was continued with Wellesley's subsequent promotions to higher ranks of nobility; he ultimately became Duke of Wellington in 1814.

The monument was proposed in 1815 by William Sanford of Nynehead Court, and he started a public subscription to pay for it. Within months £1450 had been raised and a design competition was held. The winning entry envisaged a 95 feet (29 m) pillar with three cottages at the base to house old soldiers as caretakers. It was designed by Thomas Lee and the foundation stone was laid by Lord Somerville in 1817. By 1818 the column was 47 feet (14 m) high but all funds had been spent. Another appeal raised further funds, and the column was raised to 121 feet (37 m) by 1820. It was damaged in 1846 when it was struck by lightning.

Construction restarted after the Duke's death, and was completed in 1854 by Henry Goodridge. The monument's design was inspired by an Egyptian obelisk, but in the shape of the type of bayonet used by Wellington's armies, a spike of triangular cross-section rather than a blade, with funds raised from local subscribers to commemorate his achievements. The initial designs envisaged a cast iron statue of the Duke on the top of the column with more statues on the plinth, but these were never built. The upper section of the column was restored in 1890 when the pinnacle was raised by 1.5 metres (4.9 ft).

The original plans were for twenty-four cannons, captured from the French army at the Battle of Waterloo, to be installed around the base. In 1818 one brass and 15 iron cannons were transported from the Royal Arsenal at Woolwich to Exeter Quay, but they were never transported to the monument. After years of storage at Exeter ten were sunk into the ground as bollards, and the brass gun sold in 1837 for £64 to cover the storage costs incurred by the local corporation. In 1890, when four guns were requested for the monument as part of a restoration project, they were found to be naval cannons cast in Scotland dating from 1789, and never used at the Battle of Waterloo. Four cannons were eventually installed in 1910, surrounding the monument, but these were removed during the Second World War (1939–1945) for scrap metal to help the war effort. The need for scrap metal fell and they were eventually buried at Watchet. The one cannon remaining at Exeter was brought to the monument in 1977 and finally installed in 1984.

== Architecture ==
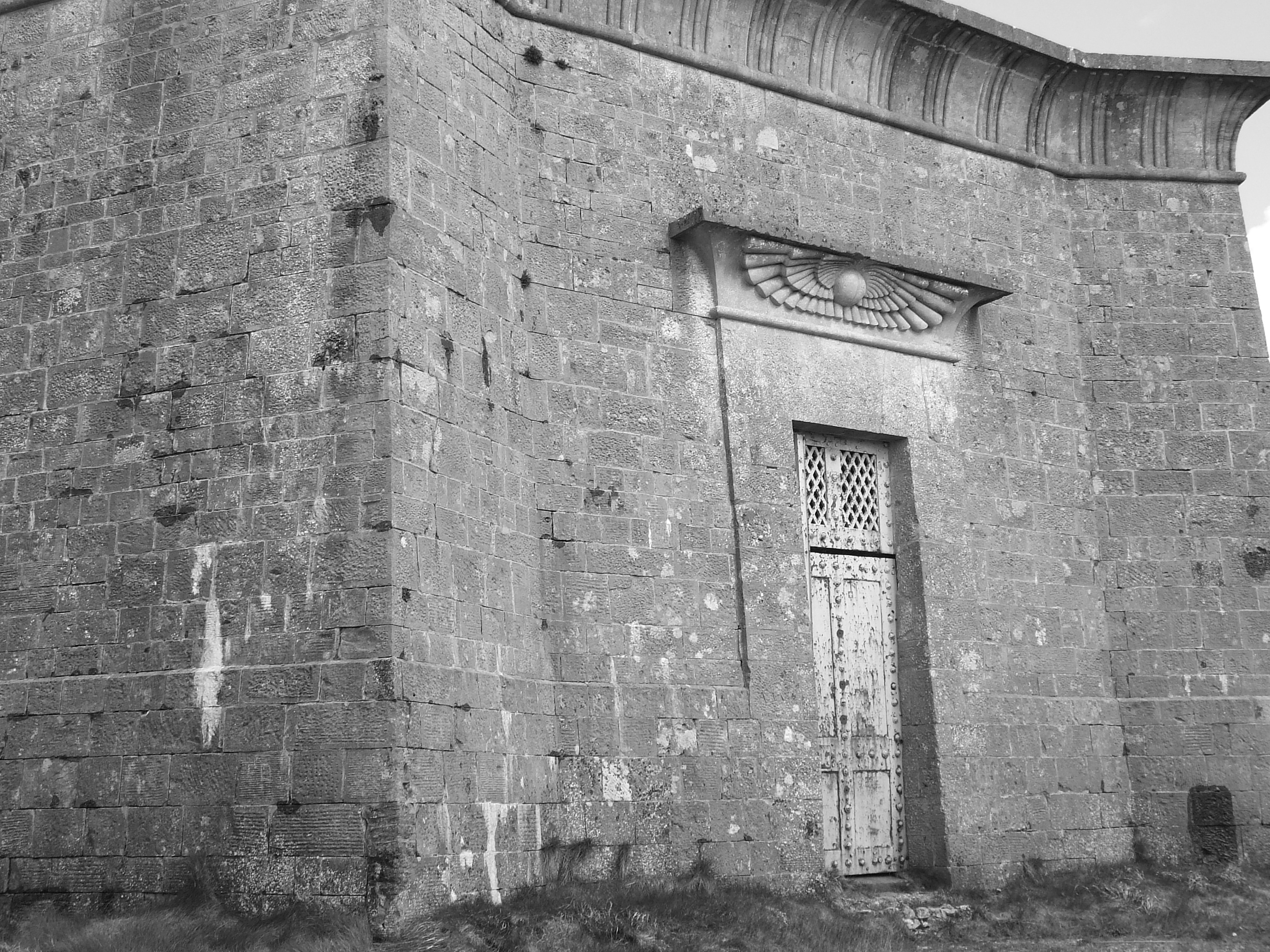
The doorway at the base

The monument is built of local stone, Calcareous Grit, a Sandstone from Northay. The triangular column is 80 feet (24 m) wide at the base and 175 feet (53 m) high. The base has an Egyptian winged panel above the studded iron door and is surmounted by a coved dentil cornice.

A counterweight hangs inside the top of the monument to help balance it in windy weather. An internal staircase ascends to a viewing platform, which has three circular windows, one on each face.

== National Trust ownership and restoration ==
The monument was acquired by the National Trust in 1934. It is floodlit on special occasions with new lights installed in 2015. In 1985, the Wellington Rotary Club donated the cannon currently standing at the base of the monument.

The National Trust closed the monument to the public in 2007, owing to safety concerns. Surveys showed that extensive renovation work was needed to reopen the internal staircase to the viewing platform. In June 2009, the National Trust announced plans to reclad the monument at a cost of £4 million.

The painted fence was replaced by an open wire fence in 2010, aiding visibility, but still preventing public access to the base of the monument. Survey work in 2010 showed the extent of cracks in the stonework. In 2013 it was announced that further funding would be needed for the restoration project. Sensors recording the movement of the tower are also to be installed.

In 2015 Rebecca Pow the new local member of parliament for Taunton Deane asked the government to make available money for a restoration fund. In 2016 she further highlighted the deteriorating condition of the monument and started a petition for its repair.

Complicated repairs were completed, over two years and at a cost of £3.1m, and the monument reopened in August 2021; the Trust said that after repairs it was expected to be removed from the at-risk register, and that it was "now possibly in better condition than when it was first completed".
