= John Ebdon (cricketer) =

English cricketer

Personal information
- Full name: John Francis Ebdon
- Born: 16 February 1876; Milverton, Somerset, England
- Died: 1 November 1952 (aged 76); Burley in Wharfedale, Yorkshire, England
- Batting: Right-handed
- Bowling: Right-arm slow

Domestic team information
- Years: Team
- 1898: Somerset

Career statistics
Competition	FC
Matches	1
Runs scored	2
Batting average	1.00
100s/50s	0/0
Top score	1
Balls bowled	135
Wickets	0
Bowling average	–
5 wickets in innings	–
10 wickets in match	–
Best bowling	0/73
Catches/stumpings	2/–
- Source: CricketArchive, 22 December 2015

John Francis Ebdon (16 February 1876 – 1 November 1952) was an English cricketer. He was a right-handed batsman and a right-arm slow bowler who played for Somerset. He was born in Milverton, Somerset and died in Burley-in-Wharfedale. Ebdon made a single first-class appearance for the side, during the 1898 season, against Gloucestershire. Ebdon made two catches during the match, including that of Test cricketer Jack Board.

Ebdon's brothers, Edward and Percy Ebdon also played first-class cricket.
