= Ebden =

Ebden may refer to:

- Ebden, Victoria, Australia
  - Ebden railway station
- Charles Ebden (1811–1867), Australian pastoralist and politician
- Charles Ebden (cricketer) (1880–1949), English cricketer
- John Bardwell Ebden (1787–1873), businessman and politician of the Cape Colony, South Africa
- Matthew Ebden (born 1987), Australian professional tennis player

== See also ==
- Hebden (disambiguation)
