= Fox, Fowler and Company =

British private bank

Fox, Fowler, and Company was a British private bank, based in Wellington, Somerset. The company was founded in 1787 as a supplementary business to the main activities of the Fox family, sheep-herding and wool-making.

== Banknote issue ==
Like many other commercial banks of the time, Fox, Fowler, and Company was legally entitled to issue its own banknotes. However, when the Bank Charter Act was passed in 1844, no new banks could issue notes in England and Wales, and the number of note-issuing institutions fell gradually with financial sector consolidation. Fox, Fowler, and Company was the last commercial note-issuing bank in England and Wales, until it was bought out by Lloyds Bank in 1921. Under the terms of the 1844 act, the bank lost the legal right to issue banknotes upon its merger with Lloyds, and the Bank of England became the sole note-issuing bank in England and Wales.

Some commercial banks in Scotland and Northern Ireland retain the right to issue bank notes, but only the Bank of England may now issue sterling bank notes in England and Wales.

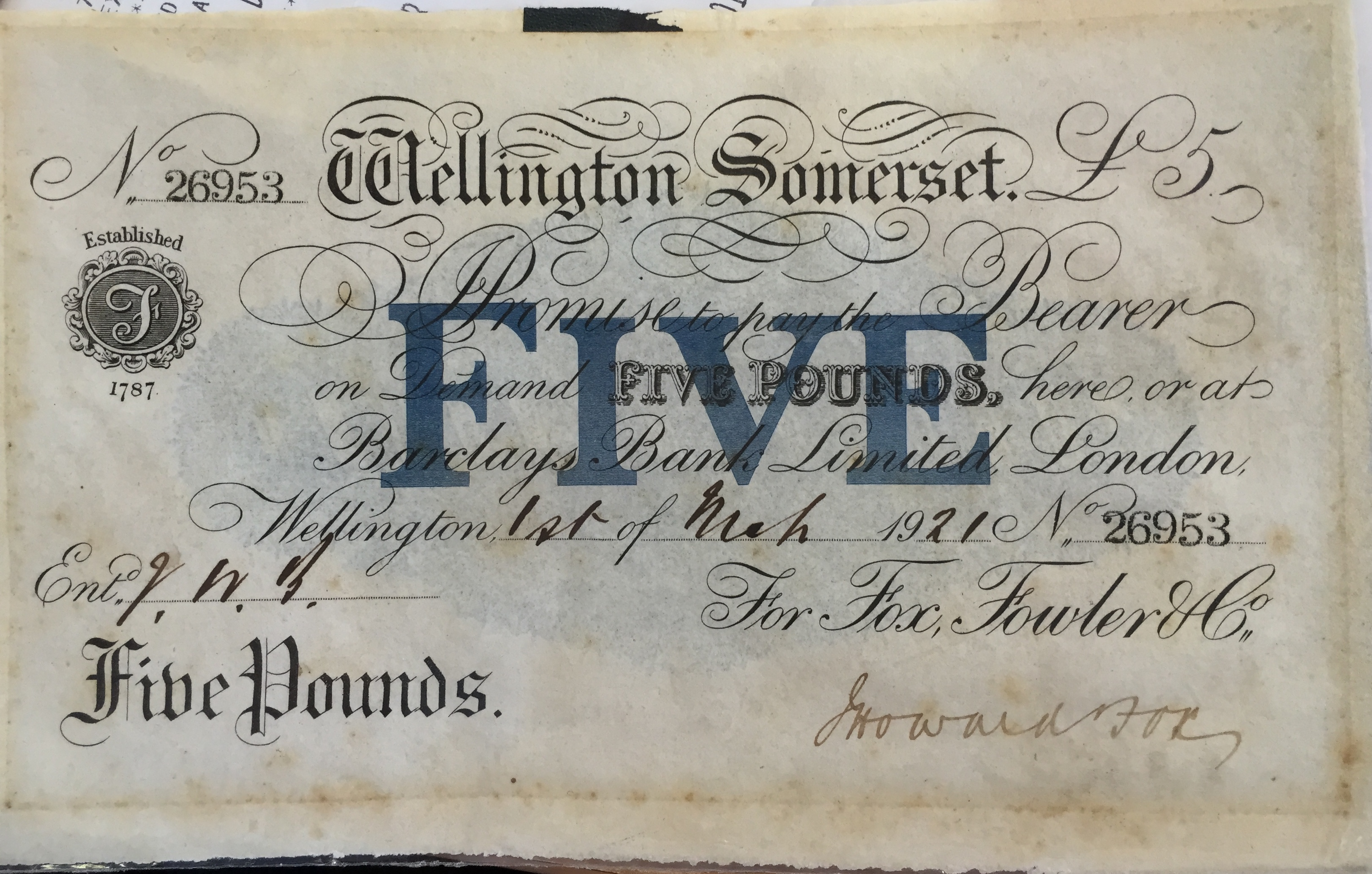
Fox, Fowler Bank of Wellington £5 note

This original £5 note is on display at Tone Dale House, which Thomas Fox built in 1801.

== See also ==
- Banknotes of the pound sterling
- Bank of England note issues
- Coldharbour Mill
- Tone Dale House
