= Edward Ebdon =

English cricketer

Personal information
- Full name: Edward William Ebdon
- Born: 22 April 1870; Bradford-on-Tone, Somerset, England
- Died: 6 December 1950 (aged 80); Clarence Park, Weston-super-Mare, Somerset, England
- Batting: Right-handed

Domestic team information
- Years: Team
- 1891–1898: Somerset

Career statistics
Competition	FC
Matches	2
Runs scored	9
Batting average	3.00
100s/50s	0/0
Top score	5
Catches/stumpings	1/2
- Source: CricketArchive (subscription required), 22 December 2015

Edward William Ebdon (22 April 1870 — 6 December 1950) was an English cricketer. He was a right-handed batsman and wicket-keeper who played for Somerset. He was born in Bradford on Tone and died in Weston-Super-Mare.

Ebdon made two first-class appearances for Somerset, the first in 1891 against Marylebone Cricket Club and the second seven years later against Sussex.

Ebdon's brothers, John and Percy, had short first-class careers.
