= Wellington, Somerset =

Market town in Somerset, England

Coordinates: 50.9755°N 3.2243°W

Wellington
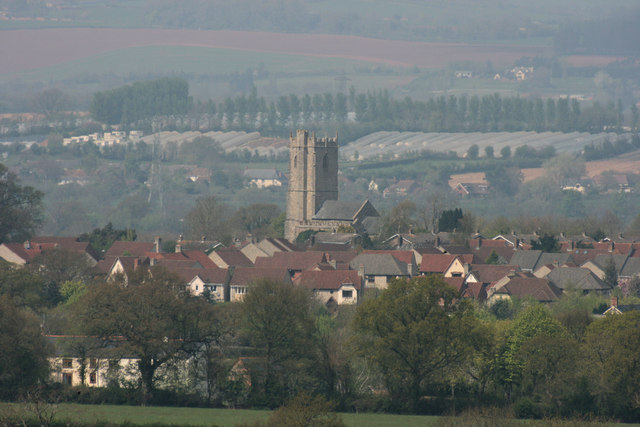
- Wellington from Chelmsine

- Location within Somerset
- Population: 16,678 (Parish, 2021); 13,815 (Built up area, 2021)
- OS grid reference: ST140203
- Civil parish: Wellington
- Unitary authority: Somerset Council
- Ceremonial county: Somerset
- Region: South West
- Country: England
- Sovereign state: United Kingdom
- Post town: WELLINGTON
- Postcode district: TA21
- Dialling code: 01823
- Police: Avon and Somerset
- Fire: Devon and Somerset
- Ambulance: South Western
- UK Parliament: Taunton and Wellington

Wellington is a market town in Somerset, England. It is situated 7 miles (11 km) south west of Taunton, near the border with Devon, which runs along the Blackdown Hills to the south of the town. As well as the main built-up area of the town itself, the parish also includes the smaller settlements of Rockwell Green, Tone, and Tonedale. At the 2021 census, the Wellington built-up area had a population of 13,815, and the parish had a population of 16,678.

Known as Weolingtun in the Anglo-Saxon period, its name had changed to Walintone by the time of the Domesday Book of 1086. Wellington became a town under a royal charter of 1215 and during the Middle Ages it grew as a centre for trade on the road from Bristol to Exeter. Major rebuilding took place following a fire in the town in 1731, after which it became a centre for cloth-making. It is possible that the fire referred to here was actually in Tiverton, Devon which has details of a major fire in the same year. Further information on a major fire in Wellington at this time cannot be found.

In 1809, the Crown referenced Wellington when creating a viscountcy for the eventual Duke of Wellington, Arthur Wellesley, after his victory at the Battle of Talavera in the Peninsular War. When the title's name was being considered, Arthur's brother, Richard Wellesley, Earl of Mornington, found an available manor in the parish of Wellington, a name close to the family name. Richard oversaw the manor's purchase while Arthur commanded the army in Spain against the French. The Wellington Monument south of Wellington commemorates Arthur.

The Grand Western Canal reached the town in 1835 and then the Bristol and Exeter Railway in 1843. The town's own railway station survived until 1964. Wellington was home of Fox, Fowler and Company, which was the last commercial bank permitted to print their own sterling banknotes in England and Wales. In the 20th century closer links with Taunton meant that many of the residents of Wellington commuted there for work, and the M5 motorway enabled car journeys to be made more easily.

Local industries, which now include an aerosol factory and the Relyon bed manufacturers, are celebrated at the Wellington Museum in Fore street. Wellington is home to the independent Wellington School, and state-funded Court Fields School. It is also home to a range of cultural, sporting and religious sites including the 15th century Church of St John the Baptist.

The capital city of New Zealand is named after Arthur Wellesley, 1st Duke of Wellington, being recognised as having some influence in the company that founded the New Zealand town. The New Zealand capital therefore takes its name ultimately from the English town of Wellington in Somerset.

== History ==
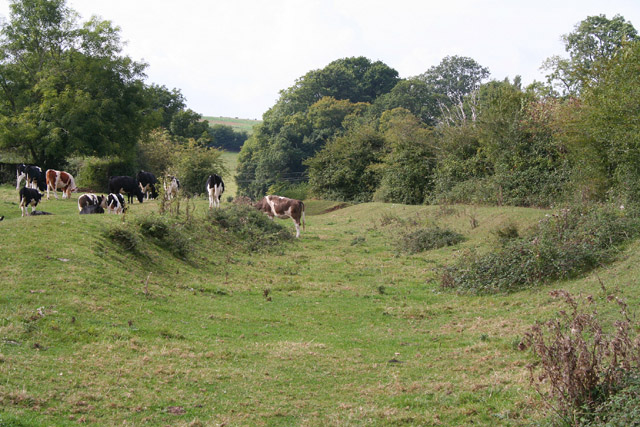
Site of the Grand Western Canal

In a grant of between 899 and 909 Edward the Elder gave the land then known as Weolingtun to Bishop Asser, along with West Buckland and Bishops Lydeard. This was in exchange for the monastery of Plympton in Devon. The name may mean "the settlement in the temple clearing". By the time of the Domesday Book of 1086, the name had changed to Walintone and the estate was owned by Gisa, Bishop of Wells. The parish of Wellington was part of the Kilmersdon Hundred,

A site at Longforth Farm near Tonedale has been identified as having Bronze Age occupation and, during excavations prior to the building of new homes, found to have been occupied by a 12th-14th century building with decorated floor tiles covering 0.4 hectares (0.99 acres).

A royal charter of 1215 gave Wellington its status as a town, and during the medieval period it grew as a centre for trade on the road from Bristol to Exeter, being laid out with the church at the east end of town, in a similar manner to other towns of this era. In 1548, the manor was sold to Edward Seymour, 1st Duke of Somerset, but reverted to the control of the bishops after his execution. By the end of the 16th century it had come under the protection of John Popham (judge) and his descendants who built a manor house which was destroyed during the English Civil War.

Major rebuilding took place in the town following a fire in 1731. After this the town's importance grew as it became a centre for clothmaking across Somerset and Devon, its importance as trade centre enhanced by fires in Taunton and Tiverton. By the 1831 census, 258 people were recorded as cloth workers in Wellington.

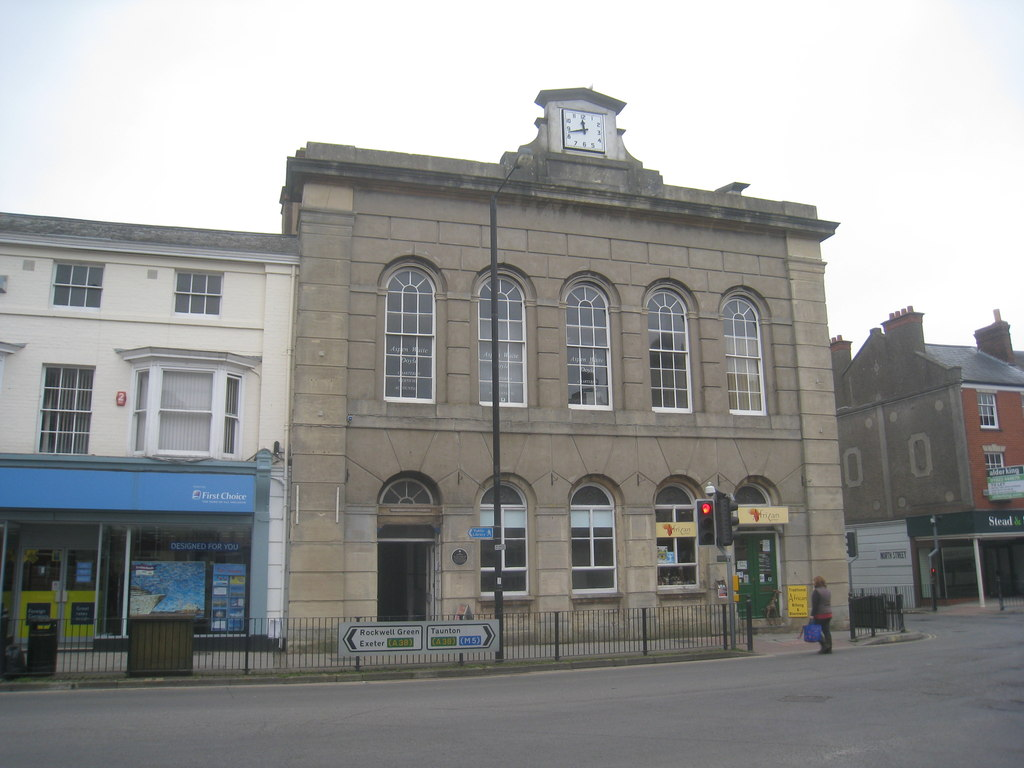
The former Wellington Town Hall

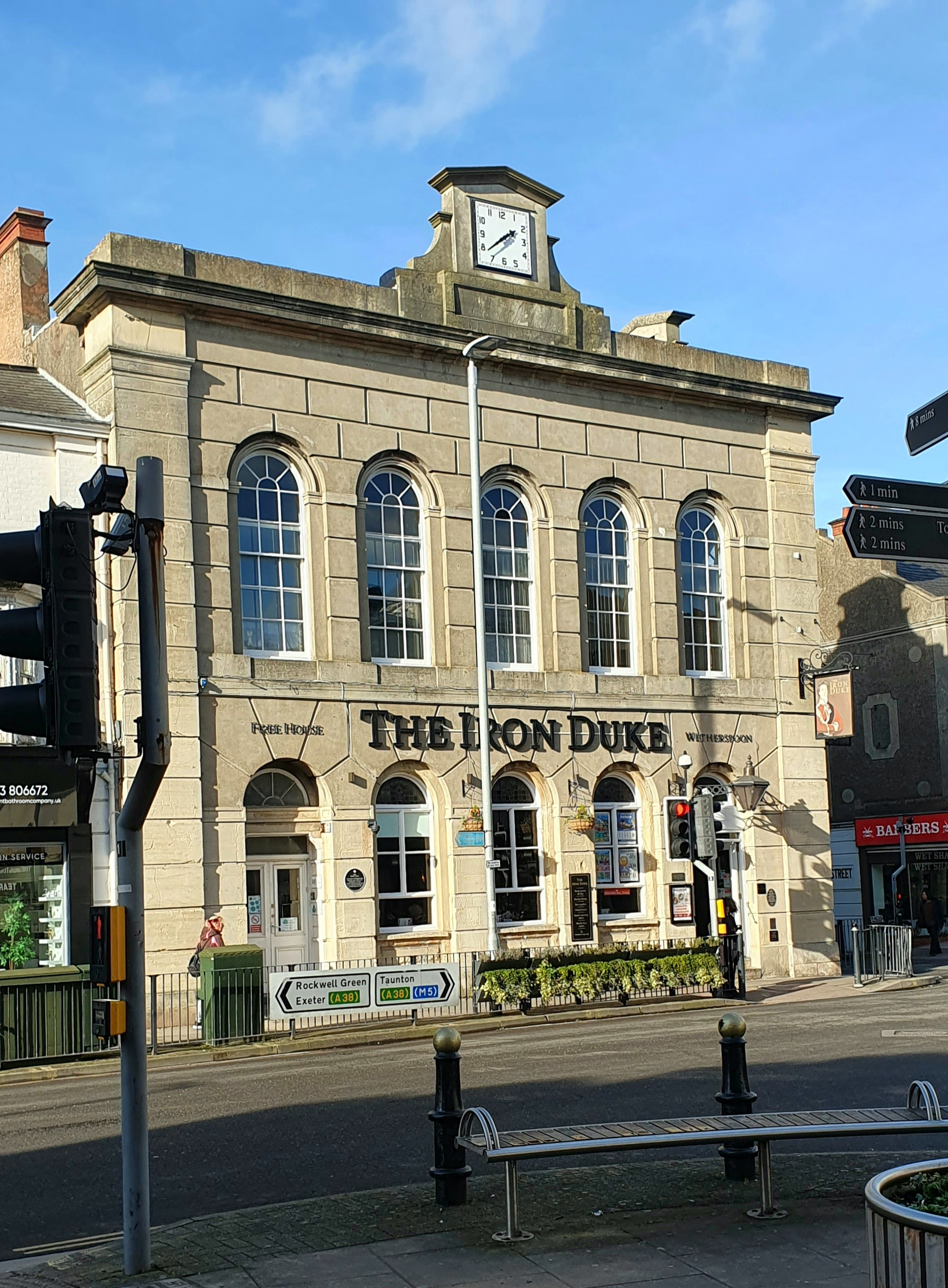
The Iron Duke, 2025

Arthur Wellesley took the title of his Marquessate in 1809 from this town of Wellington. Nearby Wellington Hill boasts a large, spotlit obelisk to his honour. The Wellington Monument is a floodlit 175 feet (53 m) high triangular tower designated by English Heritage as a grade II* listed building. It was erected to celebrate the Duke of Wellington's victory at the Battle of Waterloo. The foundation stone was laid in 1817 on land belonging to the Duke but, owing to funding problems, the monument was not completed until 1854. It is now owned by the National Trust who announced plans to reclad the monument at a cost of £4 million in 2009. Wellington Town Hall, originally built as a market hall, was completed in 1833.

In the 18th century turnpikes arrived in the area and then in the 19th communications improved with the Grand Western Canal reaching the town in 1835. Wellington station was opened when the Bristol and Exeter Railway reached the town on 1 May 1843. It was a typical Brunel design but was rebuilt in 1932 when two loop lines were put in. This entailed the platforms being moved back to accommodate the widened lines. These platforms are clearly visible and a goods shed still stands on the east side of the line at the Taunton end of the station, although the station closed on 5 October 1964. Wellington was an important station as it stood at the foot of a steep incline. Banking locomotives were kept here, ready to assist heavy westbound trains up to Whiteball Tunnel.

In the 20th century closer links with Taunton meant that many of the residents of Wellington commuted there for work, and the M5 motorway, which opened in sections in the 1960s and 1970s, enabled car journeys to be made more easily.

=== Fox Fowler & Co. Bank ===
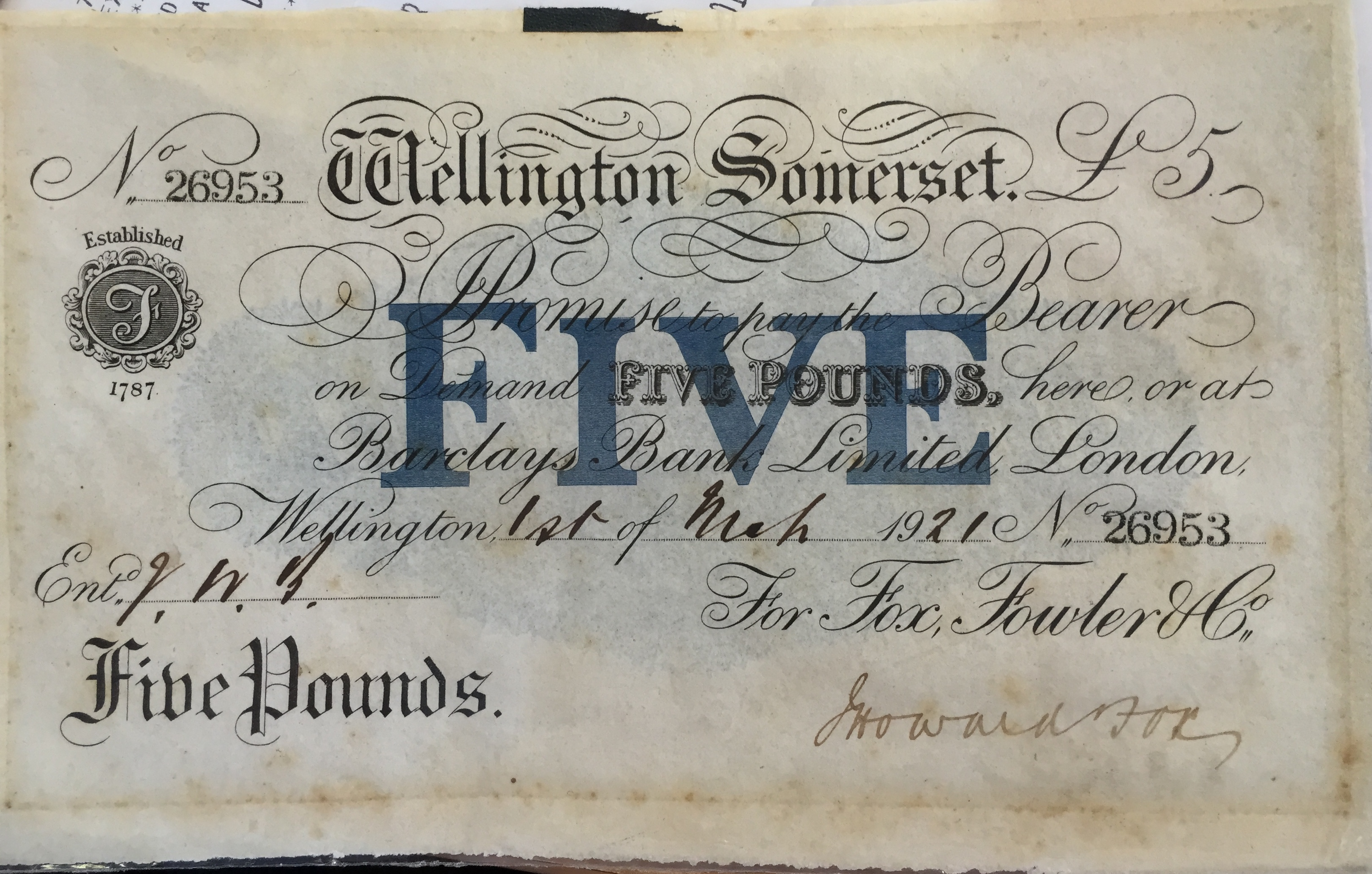
Fox, Fowler Bank of Wellington £5 Note

Thomas Fox started the Fox, Fowler and Company bank in Wellington which rapidly expanded and ran successfully, until it merged with Lloyds Bank in 1927. It was the last private bank in England to issue its own notes and they were legal tender until 1964. There are nine notes left in circulation. The British Museum have another example on display. The bank established its Head Office at the old family house in Fore Street, Wellington (today the Lloyds Bank branch) – they opened branches at Taunton, Bridgwater, Weston-super-Mare, Torrington, Bideford, Barnstaple, Ilfracombe and South Molton.

The original £5 note is on display at Tone Dale House – one of the last nine and possibly the only one left uncancelled.

== Governance ==
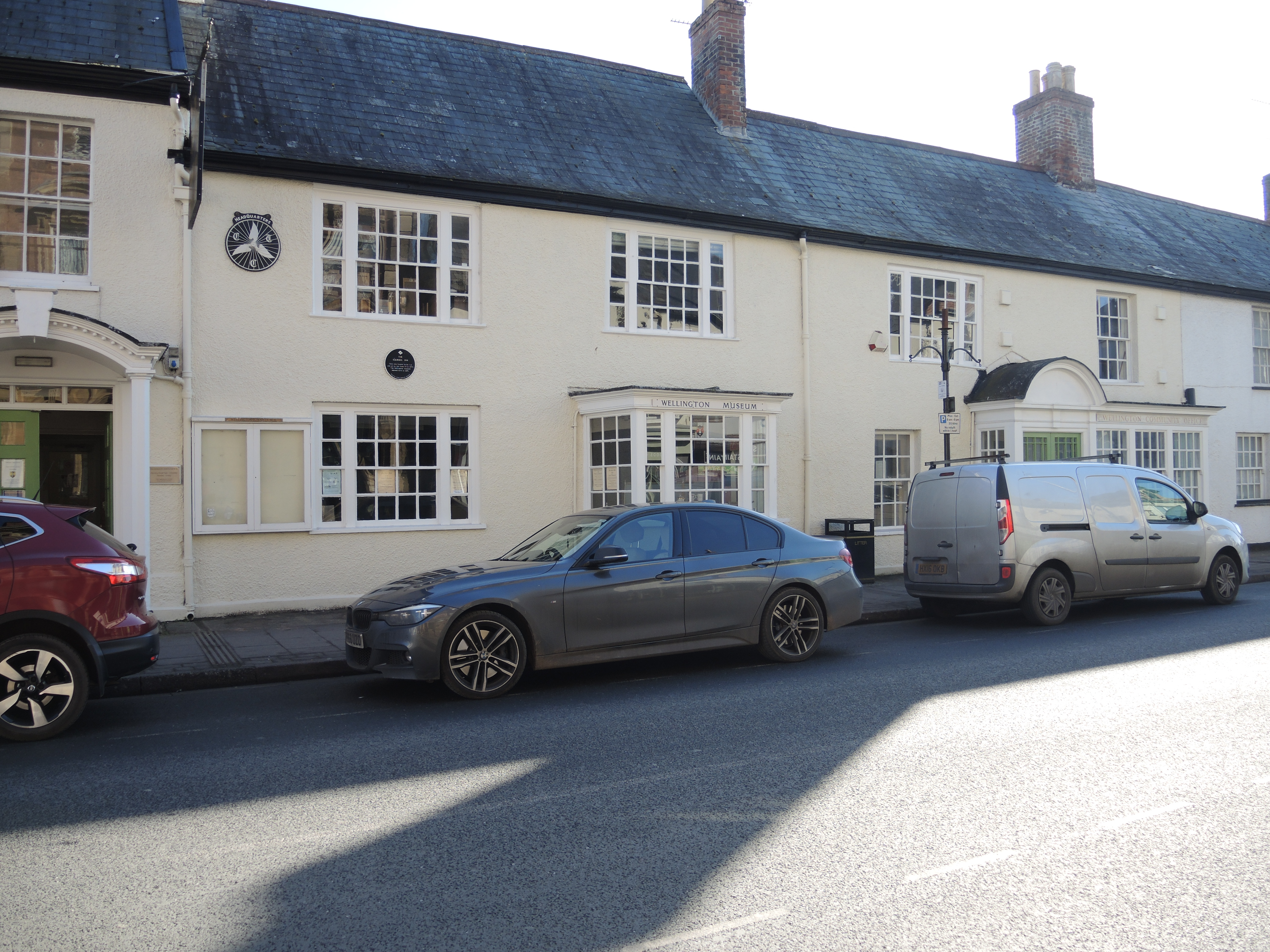
Former Squirrel Hotel at 28-30 Fore Street, now houses Wellington Museum and town council's offices

There are two tiers of local government covering Wellington, at parish (town) and unitary authority level: Wellington Town Council and Somerset Council. The town council is based at the former Squirrel Hotel at 28-30 Fore Street. The building dates back to at least the 17th century and also houses Wellington Museum.

For national elections, the town forms part of the Taunton and Wellington constituency.

=== Administrative history ===
Wellington was an ancient parish in the Kingsbury Hundred of Somerset. The parish historically covered an extensive rural area as well as the town itself. West Buckland formed part of the parish, but became a separate parish for civil purposes from an early date and eventually also became a separate ecclesiastical parish in 1967.

In 1873, the civil parish of Wellington was made a local government district, administered by an elected local board. Such districts were reconstituted as urban districts under the Local Government Act 1894. In 1933, the urban district was reduced to just cover the part of the parish around the town itself and Rockwell Green. The part of the old parish removed from the urban district, covering the more rural areas to the south and west, was made a separate civil parish called Wellington Without.

Wellington Urban District was abolished in 1974 under the Local Government Act 1972, with its area becoming part of the new Taunton Deane district. A successor parish covering the area of the former urban district was created, with its parish council taking the name Wellington Town Council.

Taunton Deane was abolished in 2019, becoming part of the short-lived district of Somerset West and Taunton, which was in turn abolished four years later in 2023. Somerset County Council then took over district-level functions across its area, making it a unitary authority, and was renamed Somerset Council.

== Geography ==
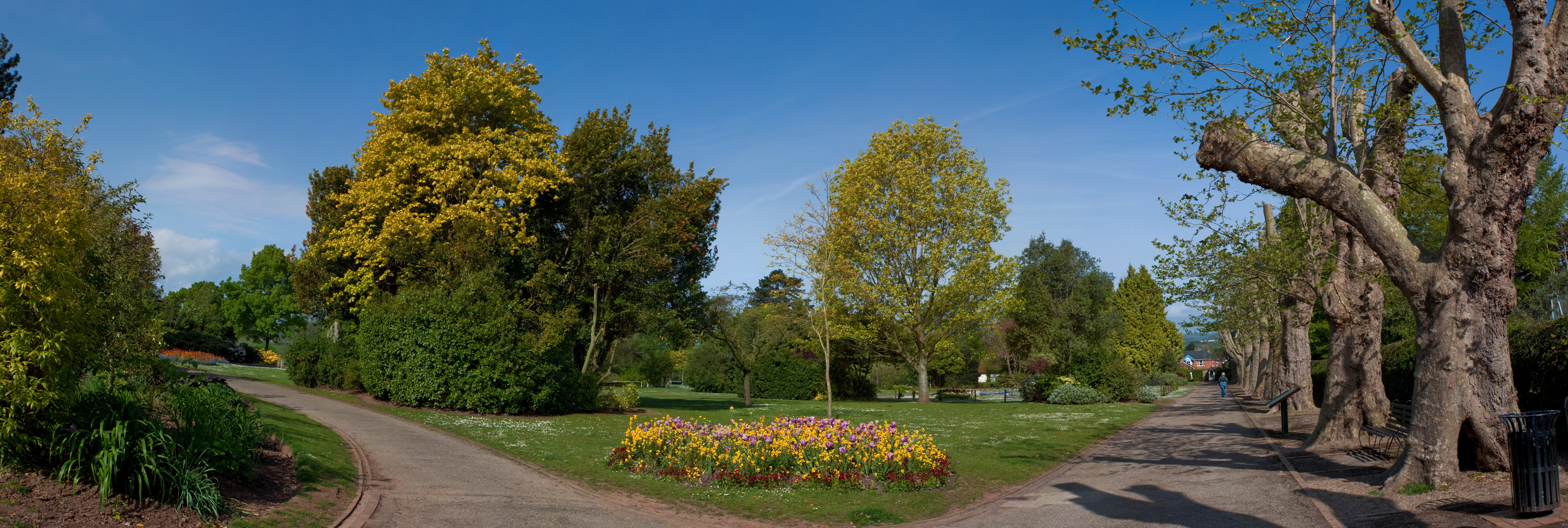
Entrance to Wellington Park

The town has several dependent villages including West Buckland, Langford Budville, Nynehead, Sampford Arundel and Sampford Moor. The formerly independent village of Rockwell Green, to the west of the town, has been incorporated into Wellington parish although there is still a green wedge of land between them. Bagley Green, just south of Rockwell Green, is also within the parish.

Wellington Park was a gift from the Quaker Fox family to the town in 1903 as a memorial to the coronation of King Edward VII. The 4.9 acres (2.0 ha) gardens were laid out by F.W. Meyer, who included a rock garden which used 80 tons of limestone from Westleigh quarry near Burlescombe. It is Grade II listed on the English Heritage Register of Parks and Gardens of Special Historic Interest in England. It was restored in around 2010 at a cost of £412,827 which included a grant of £296,500 from the Heritage Lottery Fund Public Parks Initiative.

There are Local Nature Reserves at Wellington Basins on the western fringe of the town. It includes a small pond and boardwalk with a variety of wildlife habitats. The grassland, hedges and woodland are home to a varied flora and fauna including birds such as the grey wagtail, white-throated dipper and reed bunting. Five separate bat species have been recorded at the site. Swains Pond in the south of Wellington is another Local Nature Reserve, which used to be the site of orchards. It now includes a pond which provides a home for amphibians including the great crested newt, palmate newt and toads.

=== Climate ===
Wellington has an oceanic climate (Köppen climate classification Cfb).

Climate data for Wellington
Month	Jan	Feb	Mar	Apr	May	Jun	Jul	Aug	Sep	Oct	Nov	Dec	Year
Mean daily maximum °C (°F)	8 (46)	8 (46)	10 (50)	12 (54)	16 (61)	18 (64)	21 (70)	21 (70)	18 (64)	14 (57)	11 (52)	9 (48)	14 (57)
Mean daily minimum °C (°F)	2 (36)	2 (36)	3 (37)	4 (39)	6 (43)	9 (48)	11 (52)	11 (52)	9 (48)	7 (45)	4 (39)	3 (37)	6 (43)
Source: Weather Channel

Along with the rest of South West England, Wellington has a temperate climate which is generally wetter and milder than the rest of the country. The annual mean temperature is approximately 10 °C (50.0 °F). Seasonal temperature variation is less extreme than most of the United Kingdom because of the adjacent sea temperatures. The summer months of July and August are the warmest with mean daily maxima of approximately 21 °C (69.8 °F). In winter mean minimum temperatures of 1 °C (33.8 °F) or 2 °C (35.6 °F) are common. In the summer the Azores high pressure affects the south-west of England, however convective cloud sometimes forms inland, reducing the number of hours of sunshine. Annual sunshine rates are slightly less than the regional average of 1,600 hours. In December 1998 there were 20 days without sun recorded at Yeovilton. Most of the rainfall in the south-west is caused by Atlantic depressions or by convection. Most of the rainfall in autumn and winter is caused by the Atlantic depressions, which is when they are most active. In summer, a large proportion of the rainfall is caused by sun heating the ground leading to convection and to showers and thunderstorms. Average rainfall is around 700 mm (28 in). About 8–15 days of snowfall is typical. November to March have the highest mean wind speeds, and June to August have the lightest winds. The predominant wind direction is from the south-west.

== Economy ==
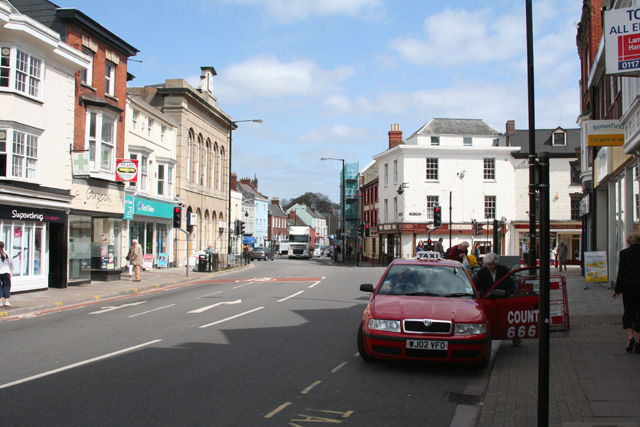
Fore Street

Wellington's main industry was wool-making and in November 2009, Deborah Meaden, best known from Dragons' Den a BBC television programme, invested in the Fox Brothers' Mill which produces wool cloth for Savile Row, designers and clients around the world. The Fox family established the mill in 1772. The Tonedale mill complex includes two listed buildings, some of which were still being used until 2000. The Prince's Regeneration Trust have been supporting the Tone Mill Regeneration Partnership in attempting to preserve and regenerate the area with a mixed development for commercial and residential use. It is included in the Heritage at Risk Register produced by English Heritage.

The last Fox family house in Wellington Tone Dale House is still owned by Ben and Victoria Fox, Ben is the great-great-great-great-grandson of Thomas Fox. Tone Dale House (since 1996) is also now run as an events and hire venue, for house parties, anniversaries, weddings and corporate events.

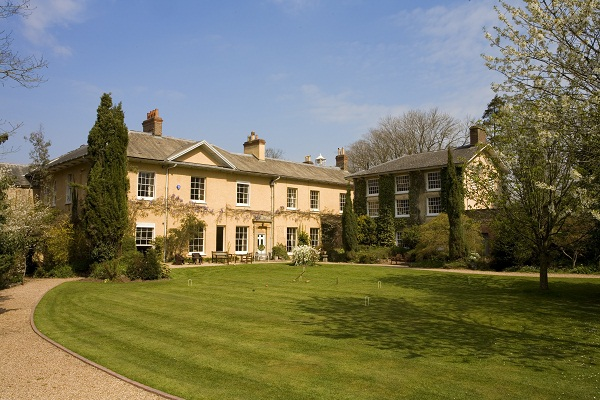
Tone Dale House

Local industries are celebrated at the Wellington Museum in Fore Street. Wellington was home of Fox, Fowler and Company, which was the last commercial bank permitted to print their own sterling banknotes in England and Wales.

The town is still largely dependent on industry, along with the neighbouring towns Taunton and Bridgwater with manufacturing industries identified within the county economic strategy as key centres for further economic development, due to good transport links. Swallowfield plc benefited from the growth of own-brand products during the 1970s and now produces aerosol, cosmetic and toiletry products. It was founded in 1876 as Walter Gregory & Co Ltd who manufactured animal husbandry products. The company diversified and in 1950 produced the first commercial aerosols in the UK which were basically farm products, air fresheners and insecticides. Bed manufacturers Relyon employ some 400 people. The company started in 1858 as a wool merchant, Price Brothers and Co., but the business soon moved into manufacturing beds and in 1935 changed its name to Relyon Ltd. In 2001 it was acquired by Steinhoff International Holdings Ltd., a quoted South African group.

== Transport ==
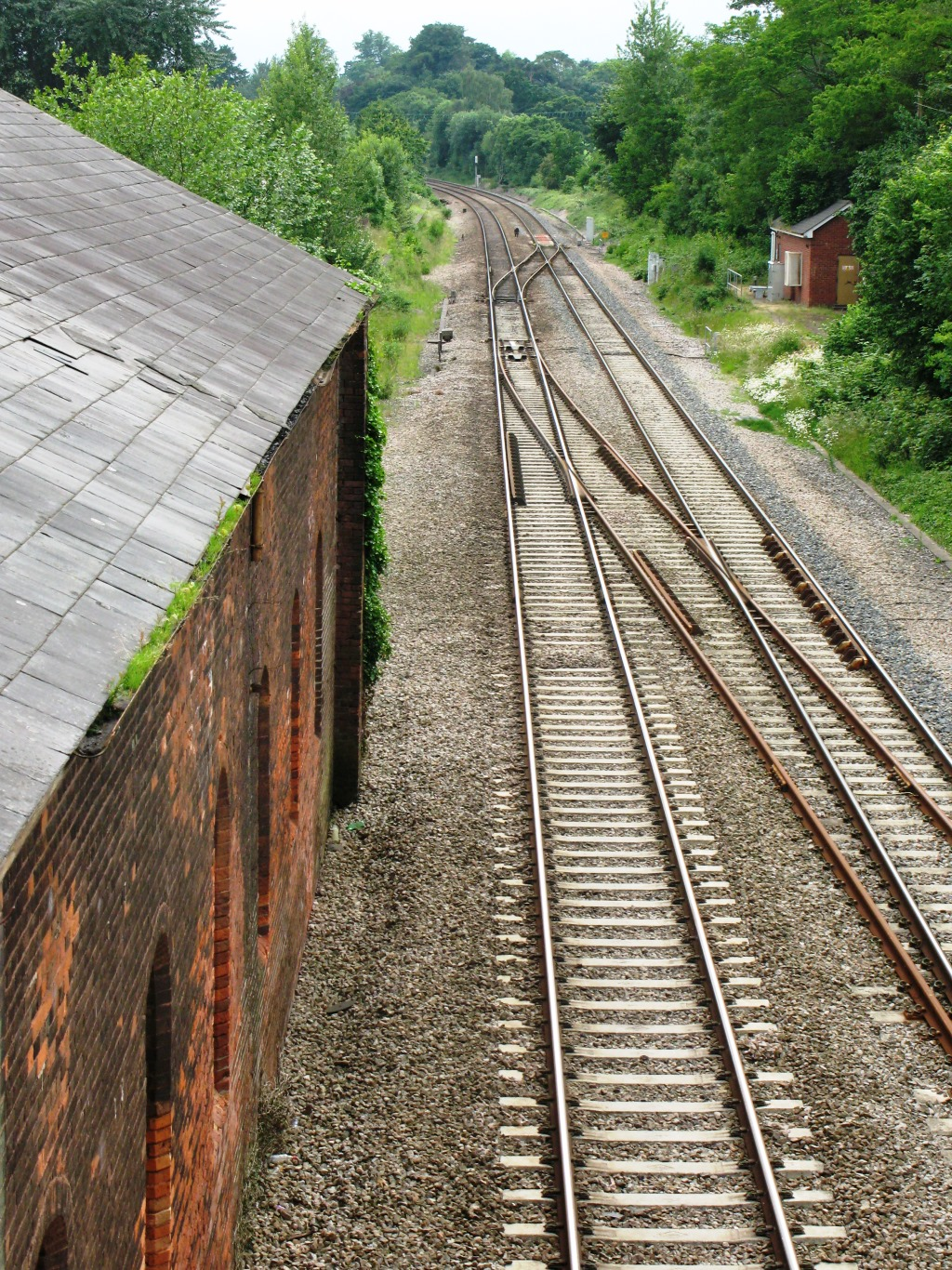
The goods shed and railway station site at Wellington

The town was served by Wellington railway station on the Bristol and Exeter Railway from 1 May 1843 until 5 October 1964. It was here that extra locomotives were attached to heavy trains to help them up the incline to Whiteball Tunnel on their way south. The railway from Penzance to London, and also to Bristol and the North, continue to pass through the town, but no trains stop. The nearest railway stations are Taunton and Tiverton Parkway. A campaign was started to reopen the railway station in 2009. The government approved a new train station being opened in the town in October 2023, but withdrew the funding for this in July 2024.

The town is close to junction 26 of the M5 motorway, which spent a year in the 1970s as a temporary terminal junction, whilst the motorway between junctions 26 and 27 was finished. The A38 is still a very important link to Taunton. Wellington is served twice daily by Berrys Coaches 'Superfast' service to and from London.

== Education ==
Wellington is home to a public school, Wellington School. It was founded in 1837 as an all-boys school. A solitary day girl was allowed to join the Sixth Form in 1972 and the following year Wellington became co-educational. The school opened a new junior school in 2000, having previously only catered for pupils aged 10 and over. In December 2007, the school commissioned its new multi-purpose examination hall and English Department adjacent to its Sports Centre. Notable alumni of Wellington School include actor David Suchet, chef Keith Floyd and peer Lord Archer.

The main secondary school in the town is Court Fields School. The 11–16 school includes a sports complex, completed in early 2008.

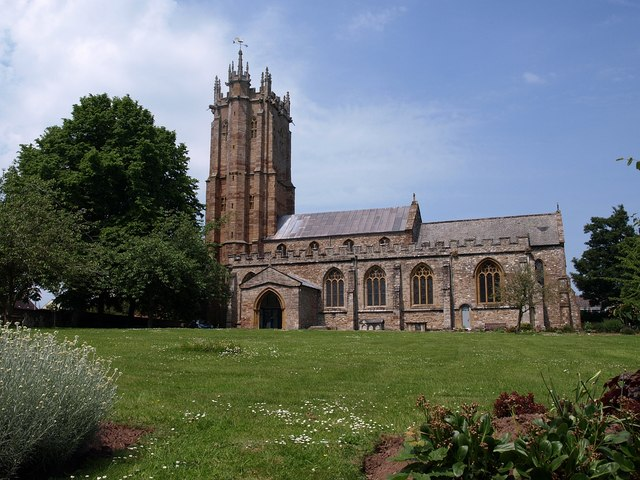
Church of St John the Baptist, Wellington

== Religious sites ==
Despite its small size, Wellington has historically been notable for its profusion of churches of many different denominations, including a Quaker meeting house, the Grade I listed, 15th century Church of St John the Baptist, which includes a monument to John Popham, and the Roman Catholic Church of St John Fisher which was built in 1606 as Popham's Almshouses and converted into a Roman Catholic church in 1936. There was a Presbyterian Independent Church.

== Culture ==
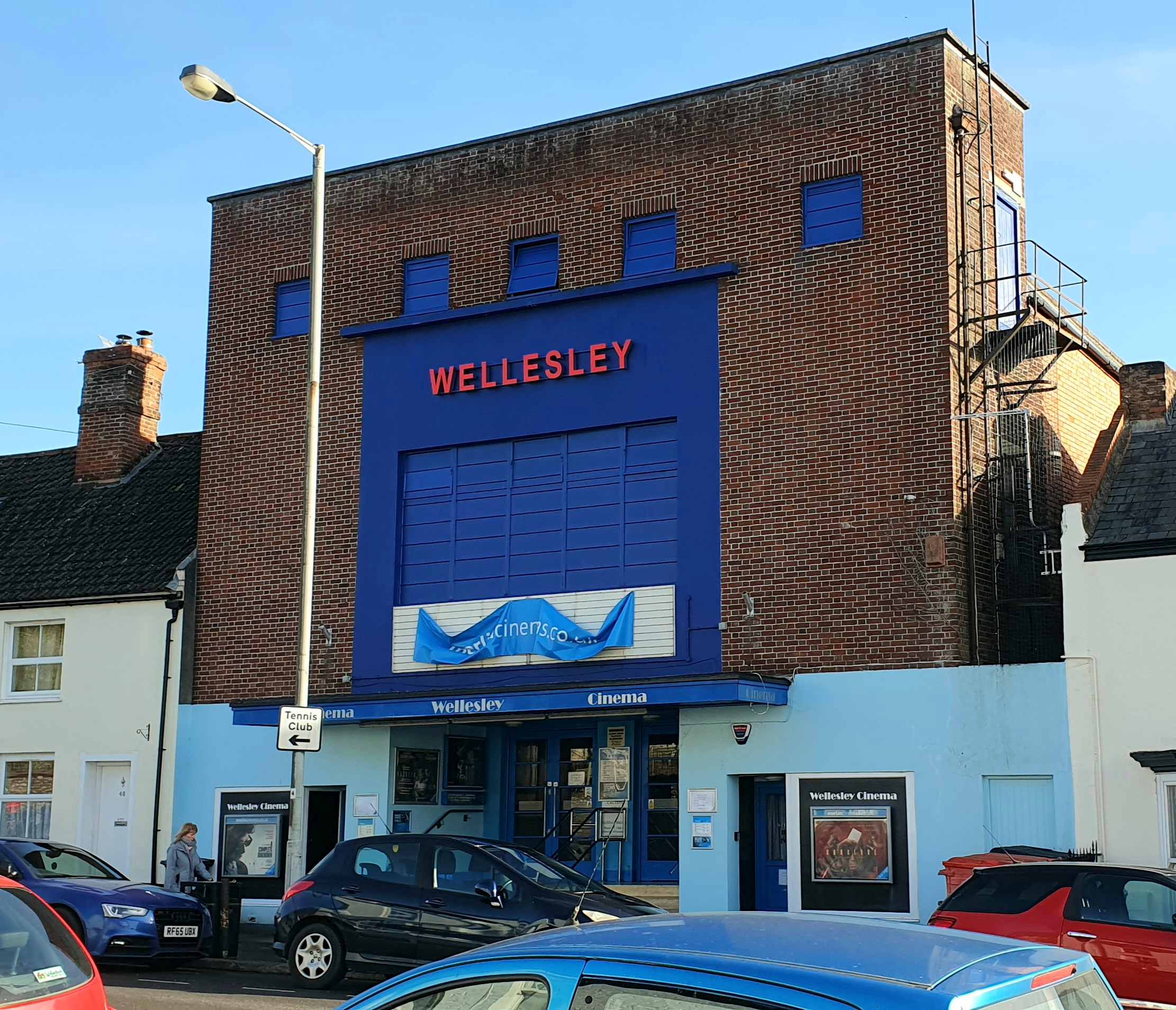
Wellesley Cinema

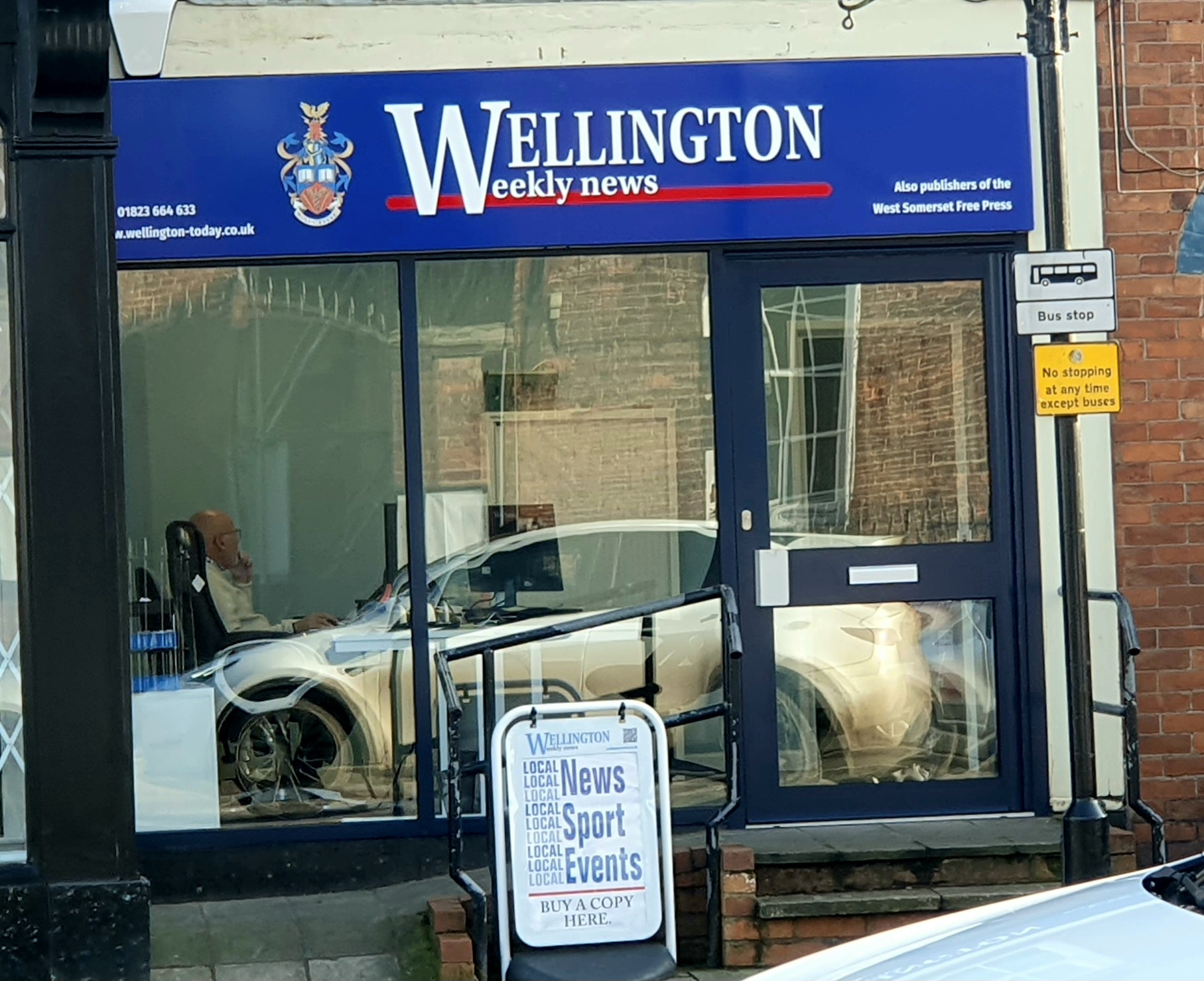
Wellington Weekly news office

Wellington has its own amateur dramatic group, formed in the 1960s, called Wellington Arts Association, which holds productions both at Wellington Arts Centre and at the Wellesley Theatre. It includes the Genesis Youth Theatre Group, Operatic Society, Pantomime Group, Civic Players, Arcadians and the Spectrum Arts And Crafts. The Wellesley Cinema was built in 1937, in the Art Deco style. The auditorium seats 400 people on two levels and is run as an independent cinema.

Wellington and District Camera Club meets in the New Science Block, Wellington School. The club is affiliated to the Western Counties Photographic Federation (W.C.P.F.) and also to Wellington Arts Association (W.A.A.).

The town has its own weekly newspaper, the Wellington Weekly News, which was first published in 1860. There is also a community website providing news and views about the town, Around Wellington.

The town is home to Wellington Silver Band, a four section brass band. The band can trace its origins to 1887, when it was formed from the volunteer band of the 2nd Battalion, Prince Albert's Somersetshire Light Infantry.

Wellington is twinned to the town of Immenstadt in Germany, the town of Lillebonne in France and Torres Vedras in Portugal.

== Sport ==
Wellington Cricket Club have a ground off Courtland Road, and have two teams in the Somerset Cricket League. Wellington A.F.C. football Club was formed in 1892 and now play in the Western Football League.

Wellington Bowmen is an archery club formed in 2001. It uses facilities at the rugby club and at Court Fields School. The Rugby club itself was founded in 1874. The first team plays in the Western Counties West League.

The Grand National winning horse, Miinnehoma was prepared for his victory in the 1994 race by Martin Pipe at his Pond House Stables in the town.

== Notable people ==
- James Lackington (1746–1815), a bookseller who is credited with revolutionizing the British book trade.
- John Gay (1813–1885), an English surgeon.
- Thomas Spencer Baynes (1823–1887), an English writer and scholar, editor-in-Chief of Encyclopædia Britannica.
- Robert Hall Baynes (1831-1895), an Anglican priest, hymnodist and hymn writer.
- Robert Crosthwaite (1837–1925), the inaugural Bishop of Beverley and Archdeacon of York.
- Major-General Gerald Hopkinson (1910–1989), senior Army officer who commanded the 4th Division.
- Richard Cottrell (1943–2024), politician, author and MEP for Bristol from 1979 until 1989.
- Simon Singh (born 1964), a British popular science author and theoretical and particle physicist.

=== Sport ===
- Henry Fox (1856–1888), businessman, sportsman, adventurer and cricket and rugby player; partner in the local family textile business, Fox Brothers; died in a mountaineering accident in the Caucasus Mountains.
- Froude Hancock (1865–1933), rugby union international player, played two tours, the 1891 and 1896 tours of South Africa.
- Nicky Jennings (1946–2016), footballer who played about 450 games, including 206 for Portsmouth
- Keith Jennings (1953–2024), cricketer, played 68 first-class matches for Somerset.
- Tim Tremlett (born 1956), cricketer who played 207 first-class matches for Hampshire.
- Tom Nichols (born 1993), footballer who has played over 490 games.

== Freedom of the Town ==
The following people and military units have received the Freedom of the Town of Wellington.

=== Individuals ===
- Richard Fox: 2011.

=== Military units ===
- The Rifles: 17 June 2023.
