= Regio III Isis et Serapis =

Historical region of Rome

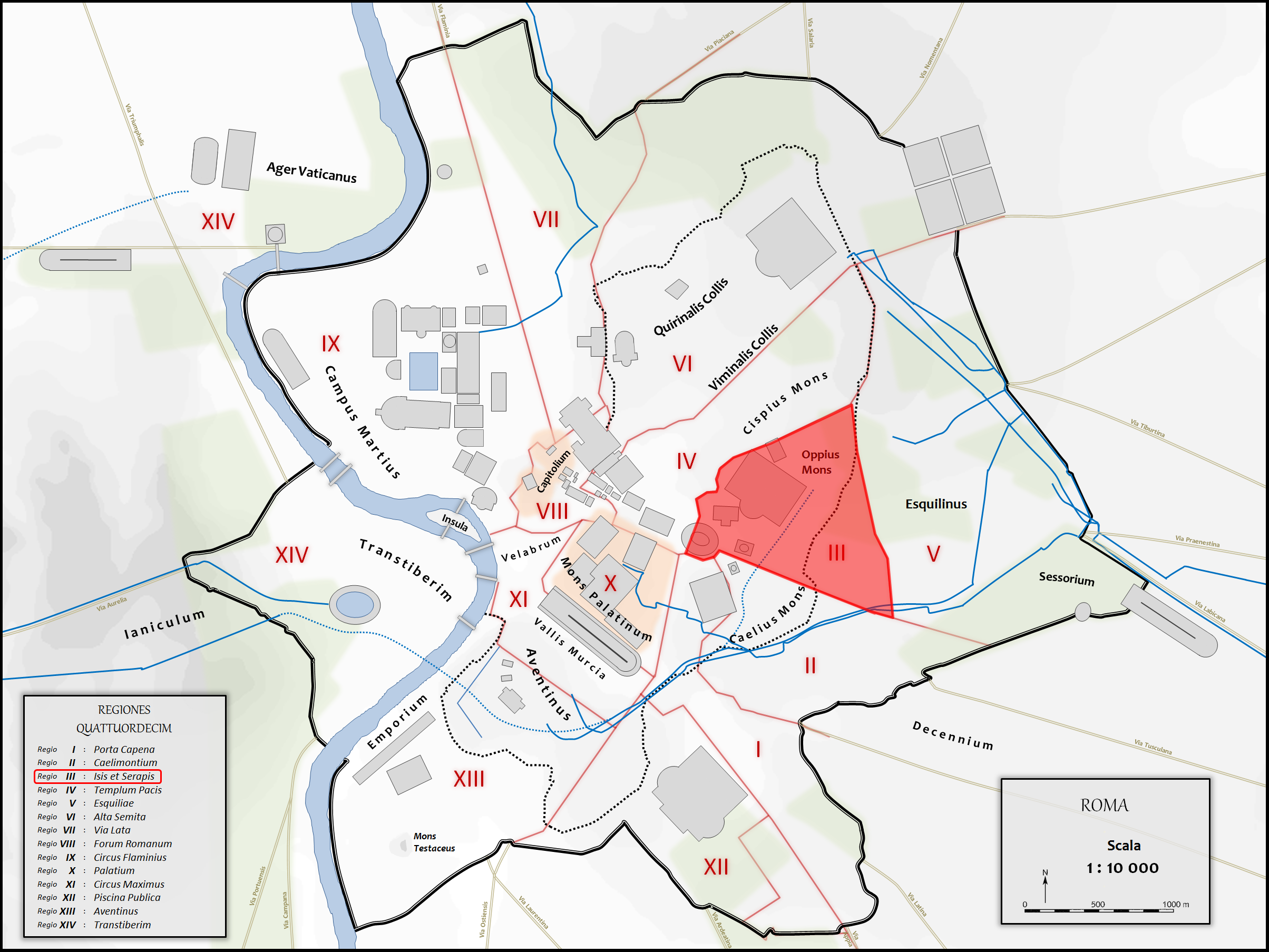

The Regio III Isis et Serapis was the third regio of imperial Rome, under Augustus's administrative reform. Regio III took its name from the double sanctuary of Isis and Serapis, in the area of the Via Praenestina, containing the valley that was to be the future site of the Colosseum, and parts of the Oppian and Esquiline hills.

== Geographic extent and important features ==
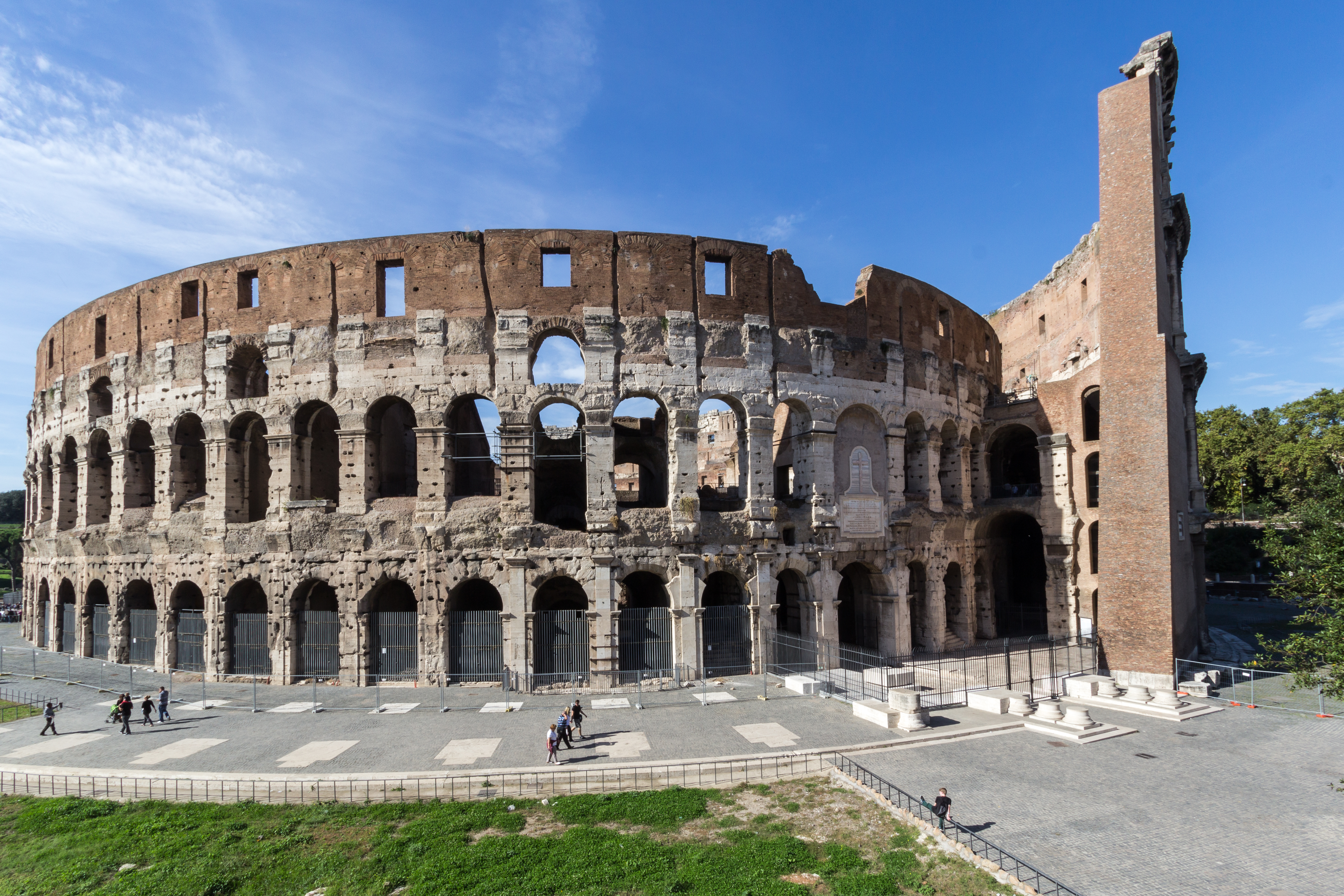
The Colosseum

Centred on the Oppian Hill, Regio III was bordered to its south east by the Via Tusculana, to the north by the Clivus Suburanus, and to the west by the Via Labicana. A measurement taken at the end of the 4th century recorded that the perimeter of the region was 12,350 Roman feet (approximately 3.65 km).

Perhaps the most noticeable structure that resided within Regio III sat in the valley between the Caelian and Oppian Hills. This was the Flavian Amphitheatre, today referred to as the Colosseum. The most important ancient festival held there was the Secular games hosted by the Roman emperor Philip in 248 CE, celebrating the 1000 year anniversary of the foundation of Rome.

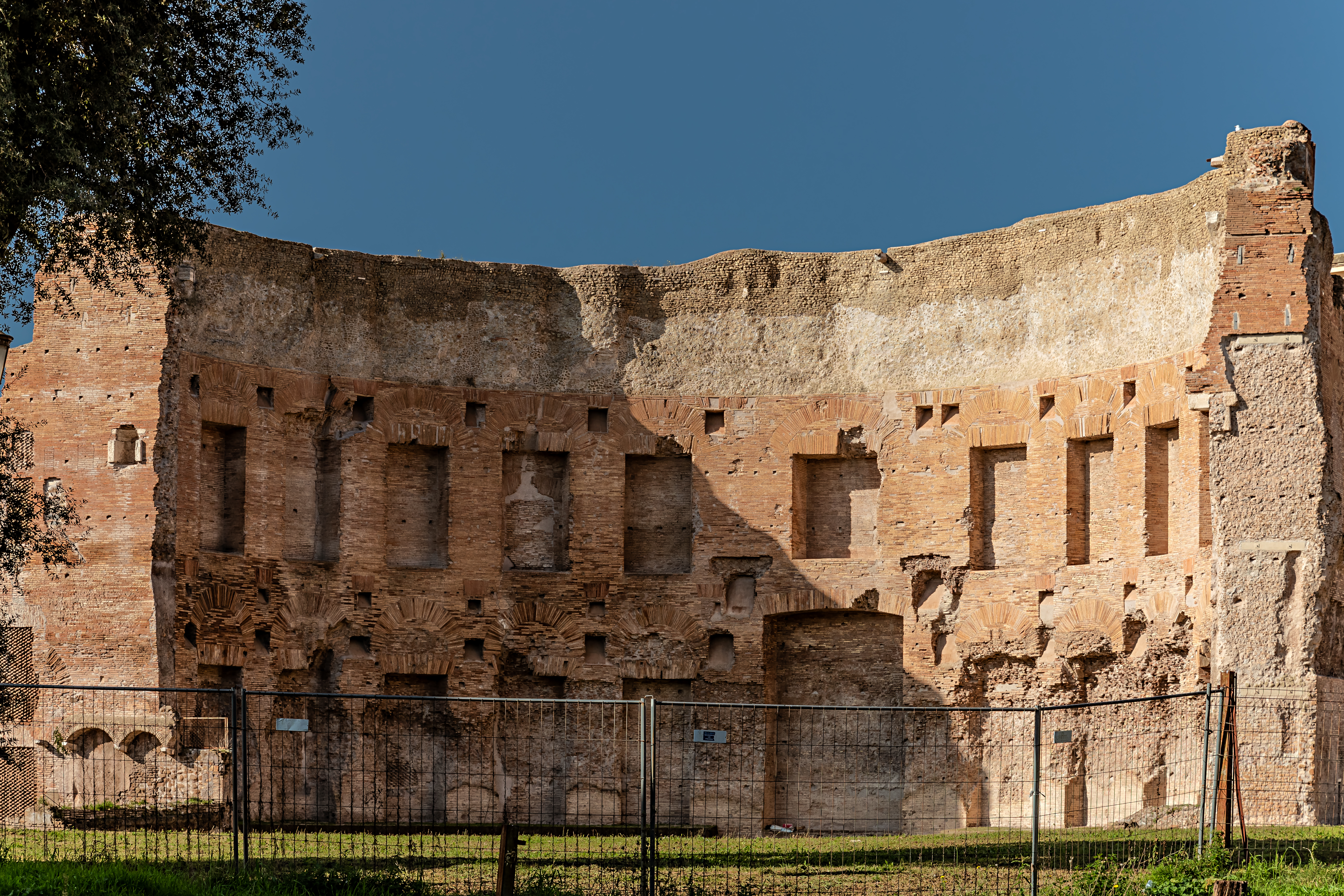
The remains of the Baths of Trajan

Positioned immediately adjacent to the north of the Colosseum were the Baths of Titus and the enormous Baths of Trajan, the former built over a part of Nero’s Domus Aurea, the latter dominating the Oppian Hill and its ruins are still visible in modern Rome. Nevertheless, the most important buildings to the ancient Romans within this region were the double temple of Isis and Serapis, neither of which are extant today. This fate also befell the Moneta, the imperial mint that stood nearby. Also destroyed (though the foundations are still visible) is the Ludus Magnus (also known as the Great Gladiatorial Training School), the largest of the four gladiator training schools (ludi) in Ancient Rome built by the emperor Domitian, as well as the Ludus Dacicus, sited on the lower northern slopes of the Caelian Hill.

Alongside these buildings was the Castra Misenatium. Here, marines specially enlisted from the Roman naval headquarters at Misenum were housed and were employed to work the velarium at the Colosseum. Finally, the northern limits of Regio III contained the site of the Porticus of Livia, built by the emperor Augustus on the site of the house of Vedius Pollio in 15 BCE, and finished and dedicated to his wife Livia in 7 BCE.

At the turn of the 5th century, the Regio contained 12 aediculae (shrines), 160 domūs (patrician houses), 18 horrea (warehouses), 80 balneae (bath houses) and 65 loci (fountains).

== Subdivisions ==
At the turn of the 5th century, the Regio was divided into 12 vici (districts) and 2,757 insulae (blocks). It had two curators and was served by 48 Roman magistrates.
