= Franco Ambrosio =

Italian businessman

- Born: Francesco Vittorio Ambrosio; 18 September 1932; Ottaviano, Naples, Italy
- Died: 15 April 2009 (aged 76); Posillipo, Naples, Italy
- Cause of death: Blunt trauma

Francesco Vittorio Ambrosio (18 September 1932 – 15 April 2009) was an Italian businessman. He became a multi-millionaire through wheat trading, primarily for pasta production, and built up a large business empire. He was murdered in a robbery at his home near Naples in 2009.

== Life ==
Francesco Vittorio Ambrosio was born on 18 September 1932 in San Gennarello, a neighbourhood close to Mount Vesuvius in the Ottaviano frazione of Naples. At the age of 18 he joined a wheat milling business near Naples which he rose to lead within 10 years. He renamed the business Italgrani SpA in 1960. Its huge financial growth led to his nickname 'the king of grain' (Italian: il re del grano). Italgrani expanded rapidly in the 1980s into Africa, Australia, and the United States. Ambrosio created a holding company comprising up to 50 companies, importing and exporting various commodities. The businesses gradually unravelled in the 1990s following his involvement in the Enimont scandal. After being arrested in 1994 on charges of defrauding the European Union out of $32 million with phantom wheat subsidiaries, he declared the Italgrani company bankrupt in 1999. Parts of Italgrani survived bankruptcy and were sold to new owners. A friend of the politician Paolo Cirino Pomicino, Ambrosio was included in investigations into possible conspiracy to defraud that involved Campania criminal organisations, politicians and entrepreneurs.

== Death ==
On the morning of 15 April 2009 his eldest son Massimo discovered the dead bodies of Ambrosio and his wife Giovanna Sacco in their seaside villa in Posillipo. The cause of death was determined to be injuries to the head from a blunt object. There were signs of a robbery: a broken window, possessions scattered and valuables missing. The next day three Romanian immigrants, including one who had worked as his gardener, were arrested and charged with murder.
