= Porticus of Livia =

Ancient Roman artefact

Portico of Livia
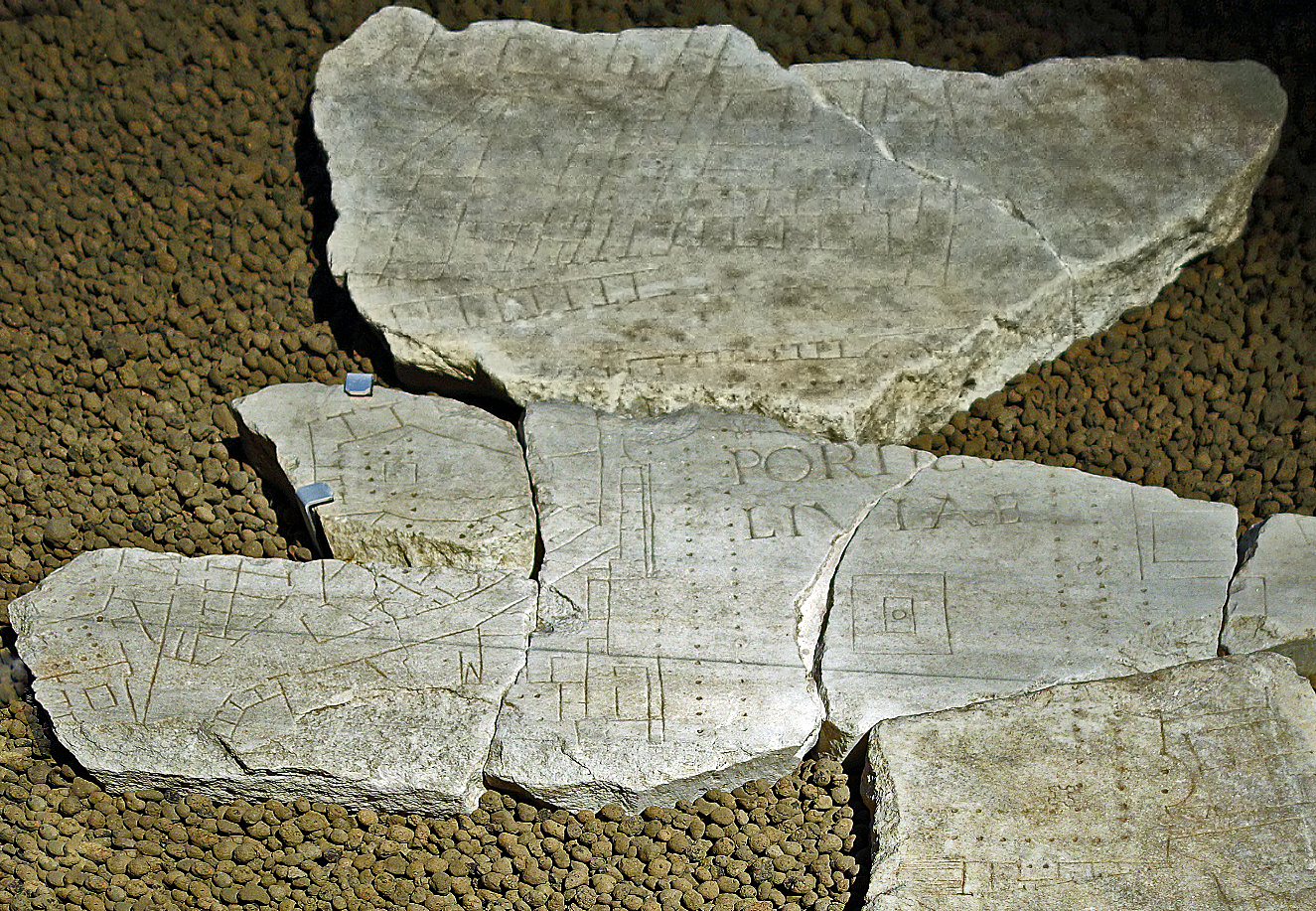
- Fragments of the Forma Urbis showing the Portico of Livia

- Location within Italy
- 41°53′39.12″N 12°29′47.04″E
- Type: portico
- Location: Italy
- Region: Metropolitan City of Rome Capital, Lazio

The Portico of Livia (Porticus Liviae) was a portico in Regio III Isis et Serapis of ancient Rome. It is located on the Esquiline Hill and was built by Augustus and named for his wife Livia Drusilla. Although little of its structure survives now, it was one of the most prominent porticos in the ancient city. The so-called Ara Concordia was located either in or near to the portico.

== Location ==
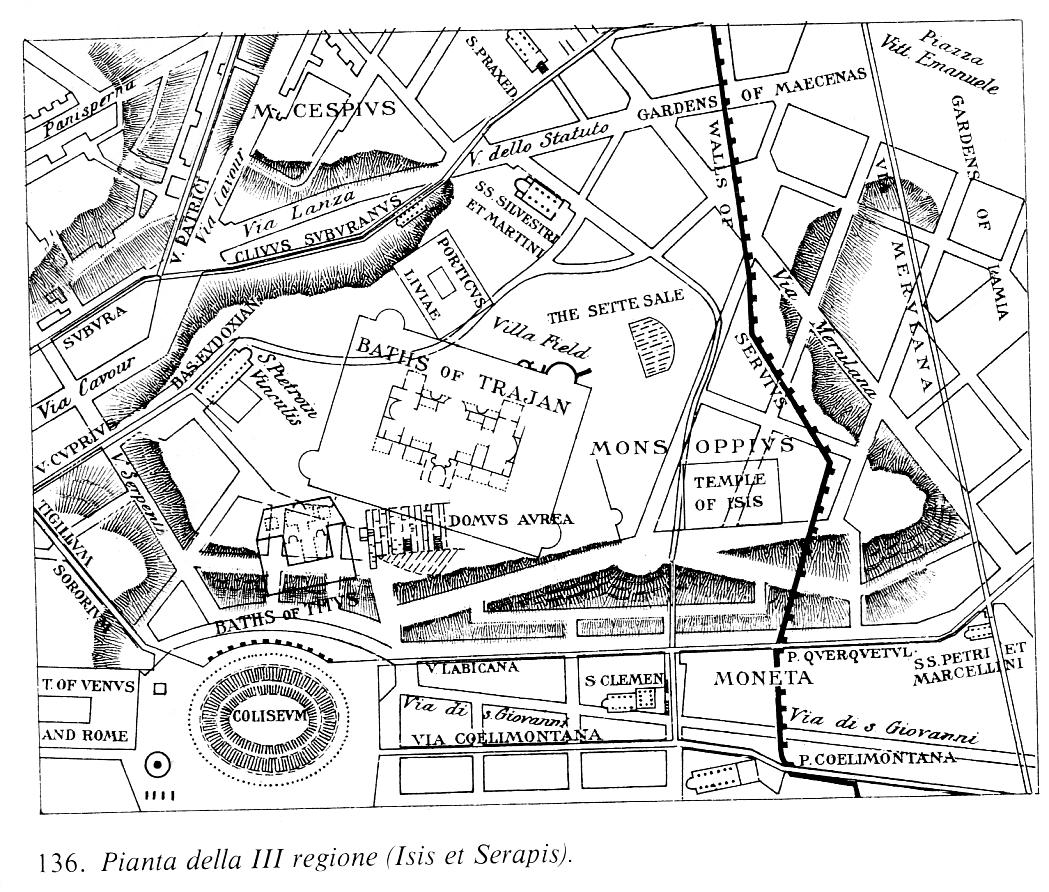
Map of Regio III (Isis and Serapis) by Rodolfo Lanciani (The ruins & excavations of ancient Rome, London 1897)

The portico is located in Regio III of ancient Rome, which is named for a sanctuary of Isis in the area, and includes parts of the Esquiline and Oppian hills. The structure itself was found between the Via delle Sette Sale and the Via in Selci (the latter was called the "Clivus Suburanus" in ancient times). The structure was built on the estate of a rich freedman named Publius Vedius Pollio, who left his house and land to Augustus upon his death. His large estate was in the midst of the fairly crowded Subura neighbourhood, and the new leisure space was probably welcomed by the residents of the area.

The portico was so close to the Baths of Trajan that the north corner of the baths almost touched the southwest corner of the portico. To the north of the portico, a basilica was built in late antiquity (San Martino ai Monti), although there are remains of a Roman building below it that some say was a house-church on the property of an early Christian named Equitius. Nero's sprawling house, the Domus Aurea, was built just south of this portico as well.

== Construction ==
Construction began on the portico in approximately 15 BCE upon the death of Vedius Pollio, and it was dedicated in January of 7 BCE. The dedication was connected with the celebration of a triumph of Tiberius, and both Tiberius and Livia hosted banquets for the occasion. Livia alone received credit for the Ara Concordia, which was dedicated separately from the portico on June 11, the feast day of Mater Matuta.

== Structure and archaeology ==
There are no visible remains of the portico today, but its dimensions and basic structure are known. It was rectangular, measuring about 120 meters in length and 95 meters in width; one of the short ends was aligned with the Clivus Suburanus. The Severan Marble Plan (see image above) thankfully preserves parts of the portico, showing its large rectangular shape, the double colonnade, the rectangular enclosure in the middle, and the access points to the streets. The portico included gardens, walking space, and works of art such as paintings, creating a luxurious and leisurely area. It is notable that this was a public space, and its construction supported Augustus' ideals of reducing private displays of wealth in favour of public building projects.

Archaeological excavations in 1984 show that the portico was almost completely destroyed; the only evidence that remains is the rough floor levels and later burials on the site.

== Literary evidence ==
The portico is mentioned in a variety of ancient works. Ovid's description in his Fasti emphasizes Livia's piety in dedicating the Ara Concordia, as well as the significance of Augustus replacing a luxurious private house.

To thee, too, Concordia, Livia dedicated a magnificent shrine, which she presented to her dear husband. But learn this, thou age to come: where Livia’s colonnade now stands, there once stood a huge palace. The single house was like the fabric of a city; it occupied a space larger than that occupied by the walls of many a town. It was levelled with the ground, not on a charge of treason, but because its luxury was deemed harmful. Caesar brooked to overthrow so vast a structure, and to destroy so much wealth, to which he was himself the heir. That is the way to exercise the censorship; that is the way to set an example, when an upholder of law does himself what he warns others to do.

— Ovid, Fasti 6.636-648, trans. James G. Frazer, 1931

Ovid also includes the Porticus of Livia in his Ars Amatoria list of good places to pick up women:

Omit not to visit that portico which, adorned with ancient pictures, is called the portico of Livia, after its foundress..

— Ovid, Ars amatoria 1.71-72, trans. J. Lewis May, 1930

Strabo the geographer names the portico as one of the most splendid monuments in central Rome. Suetonius lists it in his Lives of the Caesars as one of the monuments that Augustus built on behalf of his family members (along with the portico of Octavia, the theatre of Marcellus, and others).

Cassius Dio also mentions the portico in his Roman History, which was written about 200 years after the portico was constructed. In Book 54 of his work he criticizes the character of Vedius Pollio, describing him as so wealthy and so cruel that he threw his slaves into a pool of carnivorous eels if they displeased him. Allegedly, Augustus visited Pollio and was displeased with his cruelty; therefore, after Pollio died and left the emperor his estate, Augustus' choice to tear down his house was based as much on spite as on the desire to build a public work in Livia's name. In Book 55 of his History, he also describes Tiberius' involvement with the portico and the festivities that accompanied its dedication. The temple of Concordia which Tiberius worked to repair was in the Roman Forum, and it is not related to the Ara Concordia attributed to Livia.

Tiberius on the first day of the year in which he was consul with Gnaeus Piso convened the senate in the Curia Octaviae, because it was outside the pomerium. After assigning to himself the duty of repairing the temple of Concord, in order that he might inscribe upon it his own name and that of Drusus, he celebrated his triumph, and in company with his mother dedicated the precinct called the precinct of Livia. He gave a banquet to the senate on the Capitol, and she gave one on her own account to the women somewhere or other.

— Cassius Dio, Roman History 55.8.1-2, trans. Earnest Cary, 1917

Pliny the Elder mentions the portico in his Natural History as well, but only in reference to a certain vine which grew over the walkways of the portico, supposedly capable of producing 12 amphorae of juice per year. Pliny the Younger also references the portico of Livia in his Letters simply as a private meeting place.

The monument is also listed in Regio III of the Notitia, the 4th century Regionary Catalogues of Rome.

== Ara Concordiae ==
Most scholars assume that the rectangular structure in the middle of the portico is the Ara Concordia, since Livia was strongly connected to the deity and the Ara is mentioned by Ovid in connection with this portico. The layout of the center structure is reminiscent of the Ara Pacis, with what seems to be an outer enclosure and an inner altar area; there were four fountains on the corners of the enclosure. However, the Ara Concordia is not named in the Severan Marble Plan, and it is not certain that this is the "magnificent shrine" (magnifica aede) to which Ovid is referring, or if the Ara Concordia was somewhere else nearby. Wherever it was located though, this altar would have been an important symbol of the traditional family values that Augustus so strongly supported during his reign. The "aede" of Concordia could be interpreted as a symbol of marital harmony between Livia and Augustus; the surrounding portico would have been another symbol of family unity due to its dedication by Livia and her son.

== Later use ==
According to excavations carried out in 1984, there is evidence that the portico area continued to be used into the 5th century CE. These excavations discovered the Augustan-era paving, as well as post-Augustan levels (these levels being 10–6 meters below the current surface level). However, by the mid-6th century CE, the area was being used for burials instead.

== See also ==
- List of ancient monuments in Rome
