= Giovanni Battista Amendola =

Italian sculptor (1848–1887)

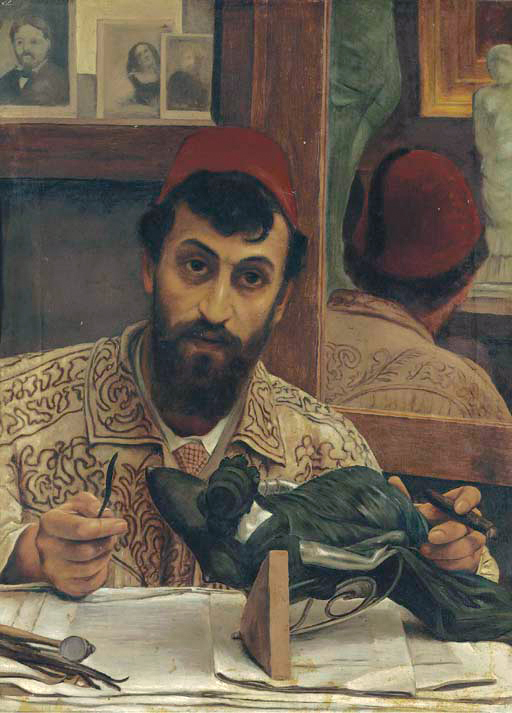
Giovanni Battista Amendola (by Lawrence Alma-Tadema)

Giovanni Battista Amendola (1848–1887) was an Italian sculptor from Sarno, Italy.

== Life ==
He studied in Naples at the Academy of Fine Arts. Much of his work is to be seen in Naples, including a statue of Joachim Murat for the façade of the Royal Palace, a bust of architect Enrico Alvino in the grounds of the Villa Comunale. In Salerno his Pergolesi Dying can be seen at the opera house. He also sculpted the caryatids at the entrance of the Mausoleo Schilizzi in Posillipo, in Naples, Italy.

He moved to England, receiving commissions both there and from abroad, with the latter including the well-known bronze of a pensive woman entitled The Dominant Thought, and Wedded (a 21"-high bronze of a young couple). He also produced a seated statuette of Laura Theresa Alma-Tadema.

== Sources ==
- Eight Statues, Eight Sculptors
