= Posillipo =

Quarter of Naples, Italy

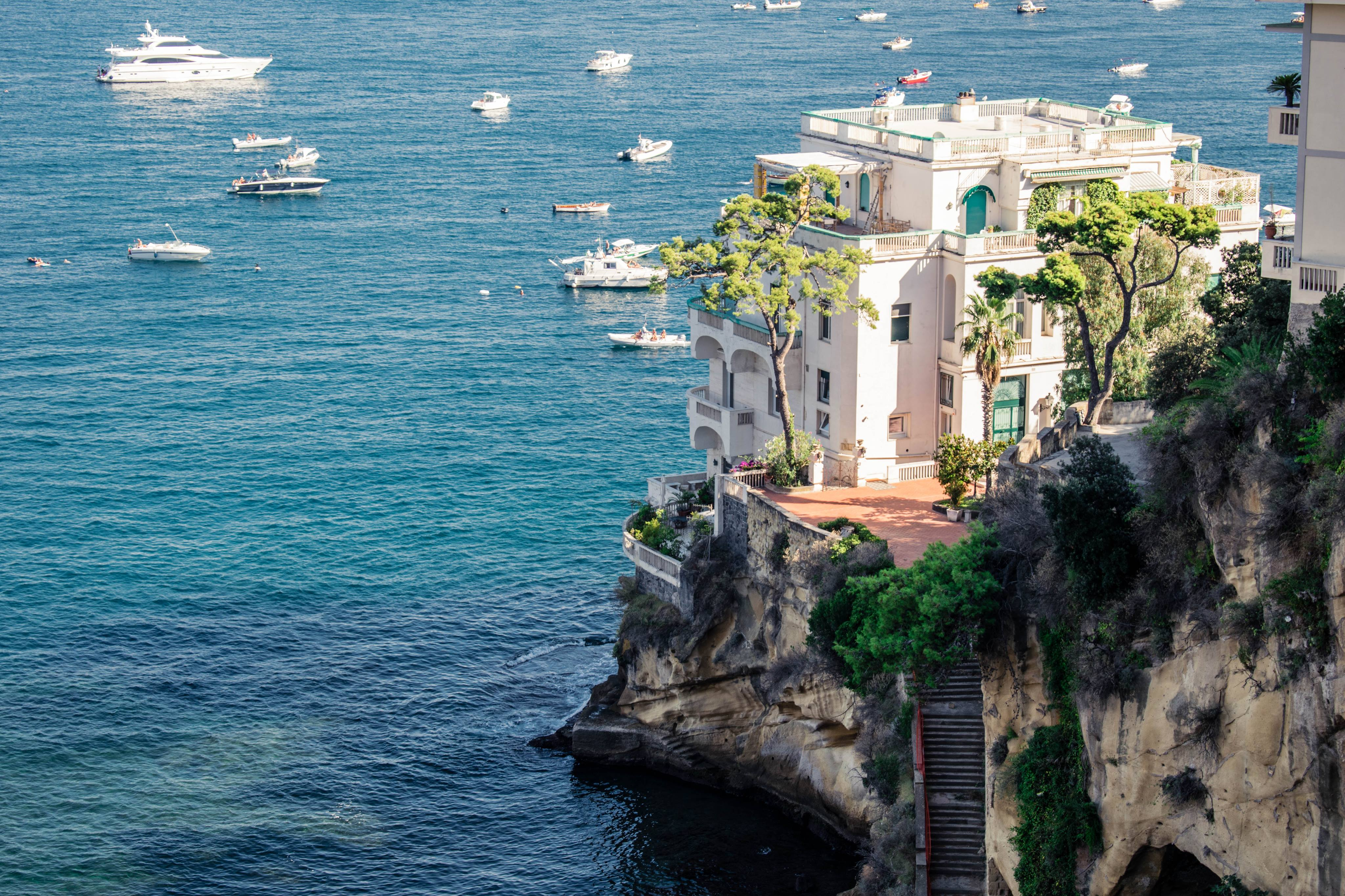

- Location in Italy
- Coordinates: 40°48′40″N 14°12′05″E
- Country: Italy
- Region: Campania
- City: Naples

Population
  - Total: 22,856
- Time zone: UTC+1 (CET)
  - Summer (DST): UTC+2 (CEST)
- Postal code: 80123
- Area code: 081

Posillipo (Italian: [poˈzillipo]; Neapolitan: Pusilleco [puˈsilləkə]) is an affluent residential quarter of Naples, southern Italy, located along the northern coast of the Gulf of Naples.

From the 1st century BC the Bay of Naples witnessed the rise of villas constructed by elite Romans along the most panoramic points of the coast, who had chosen the area as a favourite vacation spot. The remains of some of these, around the imperial pleasure villa of the Roman emperors, as well as the Tunnel of Sejanus can be seen today in the Parco archeologico del Pausilypon, or Pausilypon Archaeological Park, and elsewhere.

== Geography ==
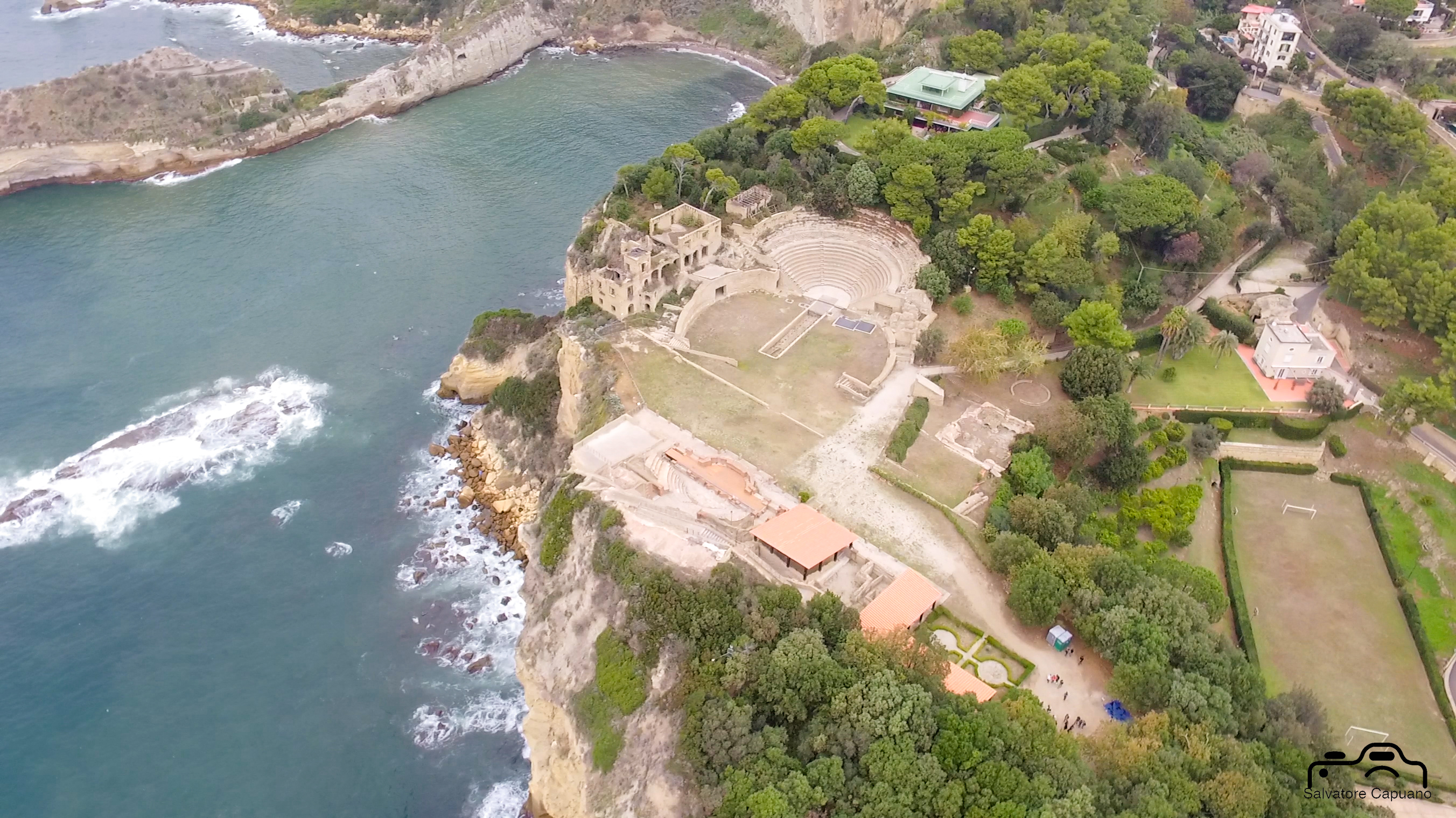
Archaeological Park of Pausilypon on Cape Posillipo

Posillipo is a rocky peninsula about 6 km long surrounded by cliffs with a few small coves with breakwaters at the western end of the Bay of Naples. These small harbours are the nuclei for separate, named communities such as Gaiola Island and Marechiaro.

== History ==
=== Antiquity ===
Posillipo is mentioned in ancient Greek and Roman sources. As part of Magna Graecia, the Ancient Greeks first named it Pausílypon, meaning "respite from worry". The French Homeric scholar Victor Bérard identified Posillipo as the land of Homer's Cyclopes. From the 1st century BC the beautiful coastline of Campania attracted wealthy Romans as a place to build elaborate and grand villas as retreats.

Of ancient Pausilypon the most visible ruins are those of the notorious villa of Vedius Pollio, later to become an imperial villa. The villa was described by the poet Ovid as "like a city". Most notoriously, he kept a pool of lampreys into which slaves who incurred his displeasure would be thrown as food, a particularly unpleasant means of death, since the lamprey "clamps its mouth on the victim and bores a dentated tongue into the flesh to ingest blood". However, the emperor, Augustus, on visiting Pollio and witnessing the condemnation of a slave, took action against Pollio and saved the slave, an incident widely documented in writings of the era (see Vedius Pollio for more details).

Vedius died in 15 BC and was probably forced to bequeath a large part of his estates, including the villa, to the emperor Augustus. Although Augustus had Vedius' mansion in Rome razed, Pausilypon was rebuilt and extended to become a palace, which remained in imperial possession at least until the time of Hadrian.

=== Early modern period ===
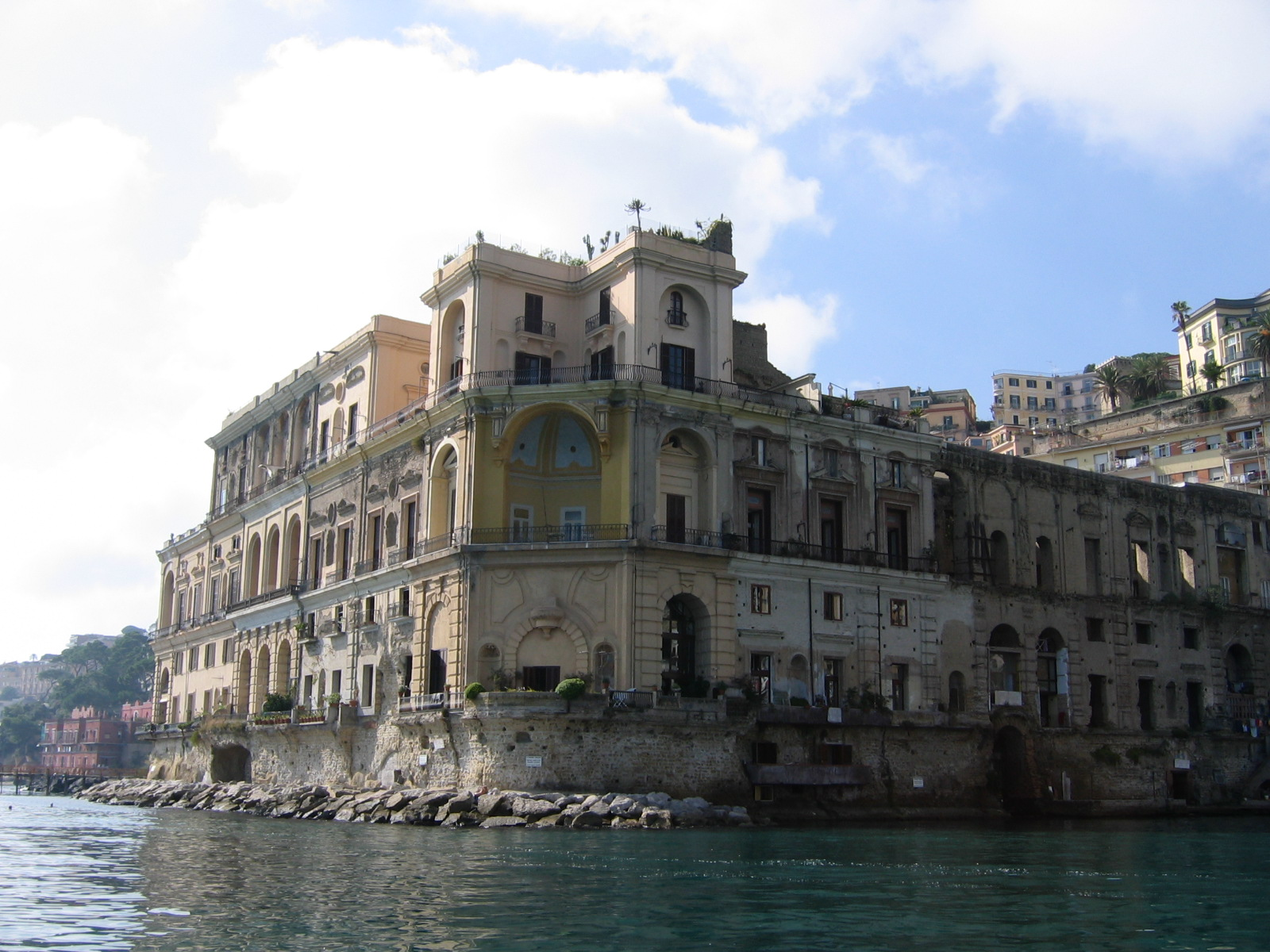
Villa Donn'Anna

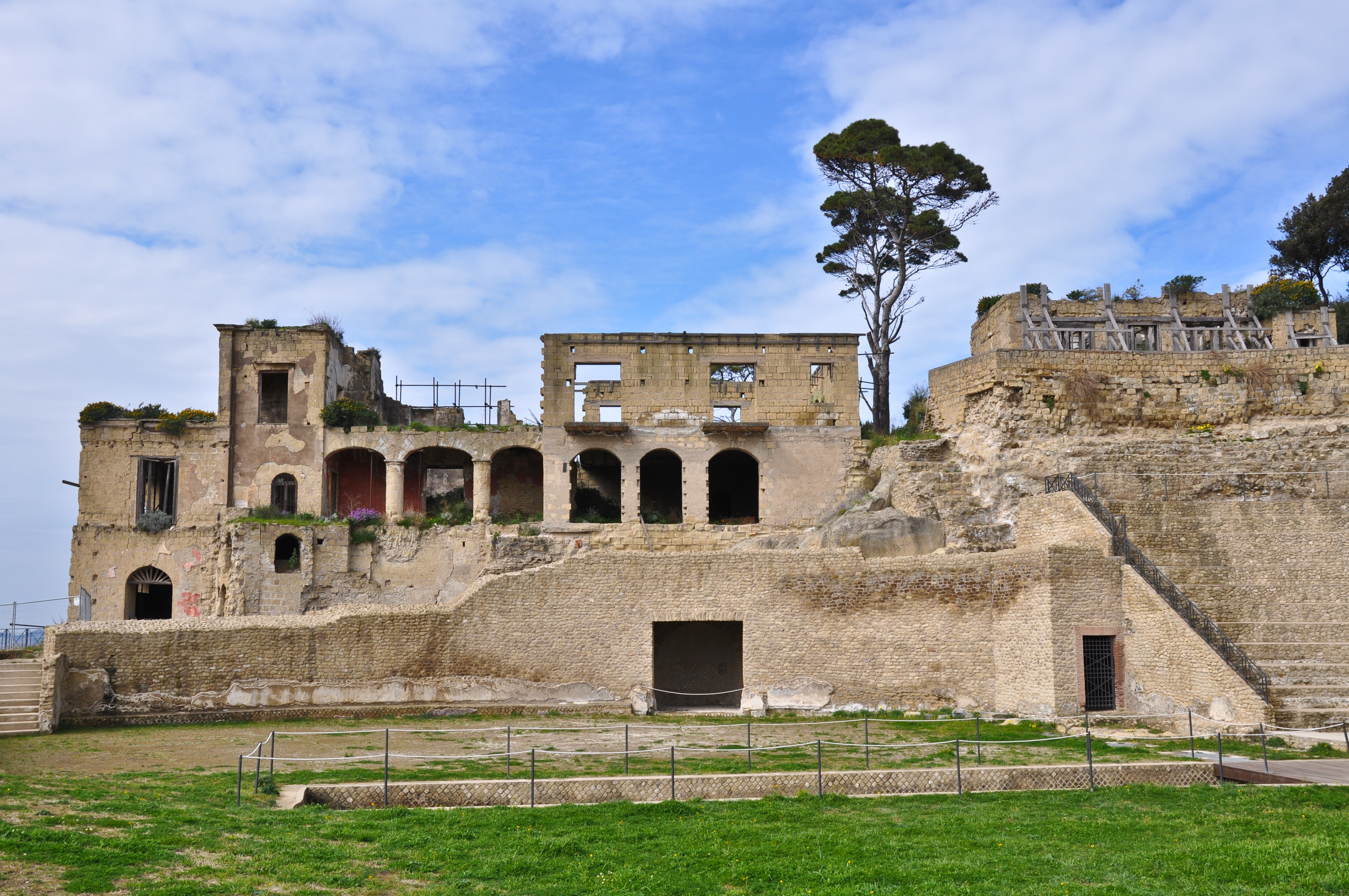
Villa Vedius Pollio

In the 17th century the property of the site of the imperial villa passed to the family Maza who, for several generations, showed an interest in archaeology and Francesco Maria Maza (c. 1680) was the author of inscriptions which he affixed to the so-called 'Piscine of V.Pollio' and to the 'Temple of Fortune' which were in situ as late as 1913. However the Maza collection was dispersed and the loss to archaeological science was irreparable as a catalogue had never been prepared. Several objects of art from Posillipan sites found their way into the hands of Spanish collectors, and are still no doubt among the Roman antiquities in Spain. Many fine pieces were taken to Mergellina and lost among the other ornaments of the villa of the Duke of Medina.

=== 19th century ===
In 1820 the southern portion of the property was purchased by a well-known Neapolitan archaeologist, cavaliere Guglielmo Bechi, and his name was associated with the Villa for more than half a century. He did much excavation, but again without publication of results.

In 1841 more methodical excavations were begun on the adjoining property to the west of the ancient lane that led down the valley from the "Tunnel of Sejanus" to the sea. The principal buildings of that part of the Villa were soon brought to light; the Theatre, an Odeon, and the remains of a Portico overlooking the sea. An oblong building called the temple was also found along with the remains of an aqueduct.

In about 1870 the Marchese del Tufo opened a quarry for pozzolana clearing away the central part of what had been a broad continuous terrace along the south front of the property in Roman times. The buildings that stood on the hillside above the terrace, including the southern part of the baths, fell down the slope into the sea.

== Roman Pausilypon ==
The archaeological park is located along the coast of Posillipo, offering views of the surrounding coastline and archeological landscape.

Among the most important sites are the "cave of Sejanus", the underwater park of Gaiola, the imperial villa of Pausilypon (including the odeon, theatre) and the Palace of the Spirits.

=== Imperial villa ===
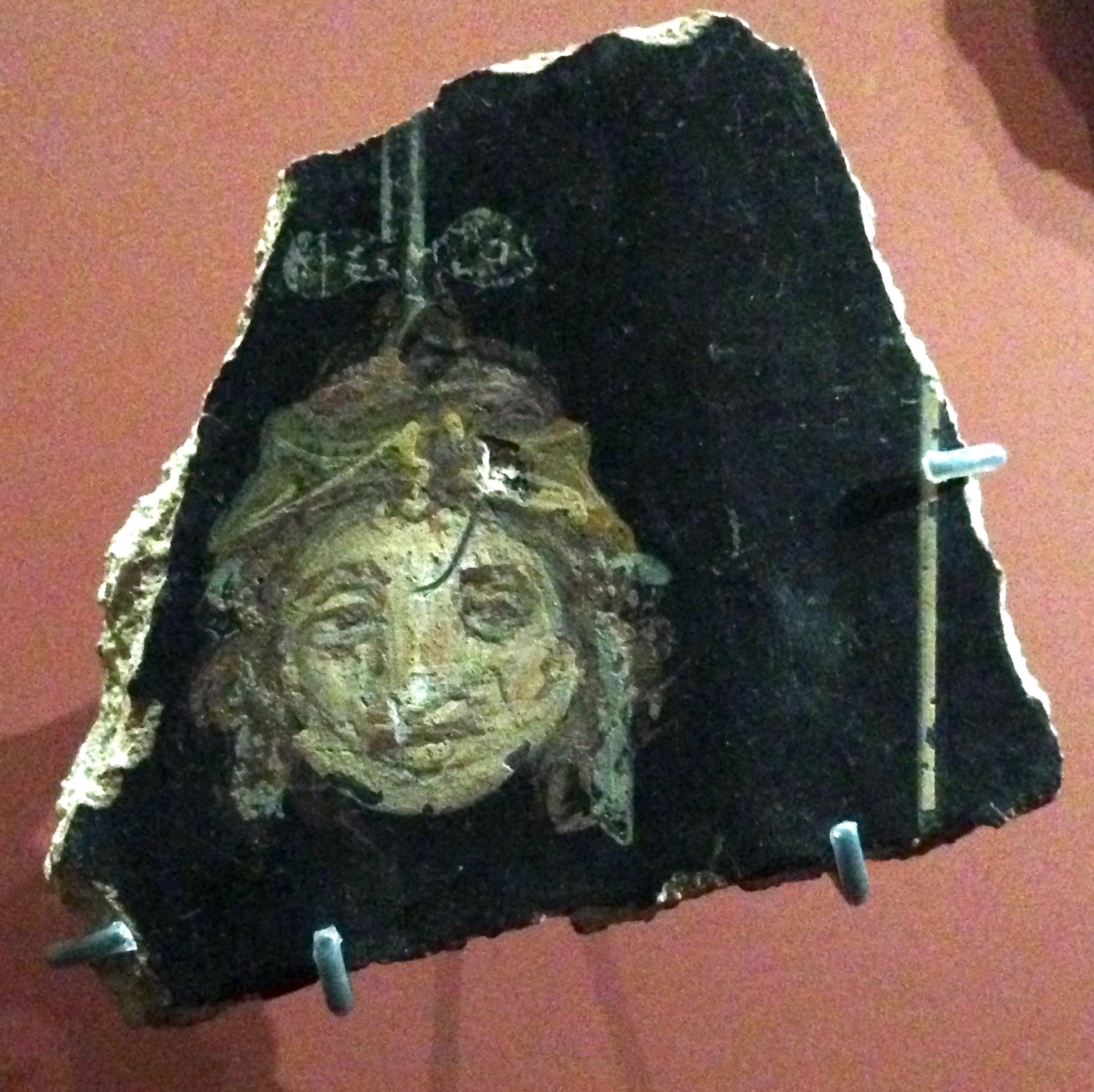
Fragment of fresco, Villa of Vedius Pollio, Ashmolean Museum

The ruins of the Roman villa of Vedius Pollio, also known as the Imperial Villa, include a 2000-seat theatre on the rocky promontory at the end of the Bay of Naples. Some of the villa's rooms can be seen with traces of the wall decorations while its marine structures and fish ponds are now part of the neighbouring submerged Gaiola Park.

The villa was built in the first century BC by Publius Vedius Pollio. On his death in 15 BC, the villa was bequeathed to Augustus, and remained in imperial possession for his successors at least until Hadrian, as witnessed by a stamped water pipe. In various points the presence of water supply pipes (coated with hydraulic mortar) show the opulence of the facilities.

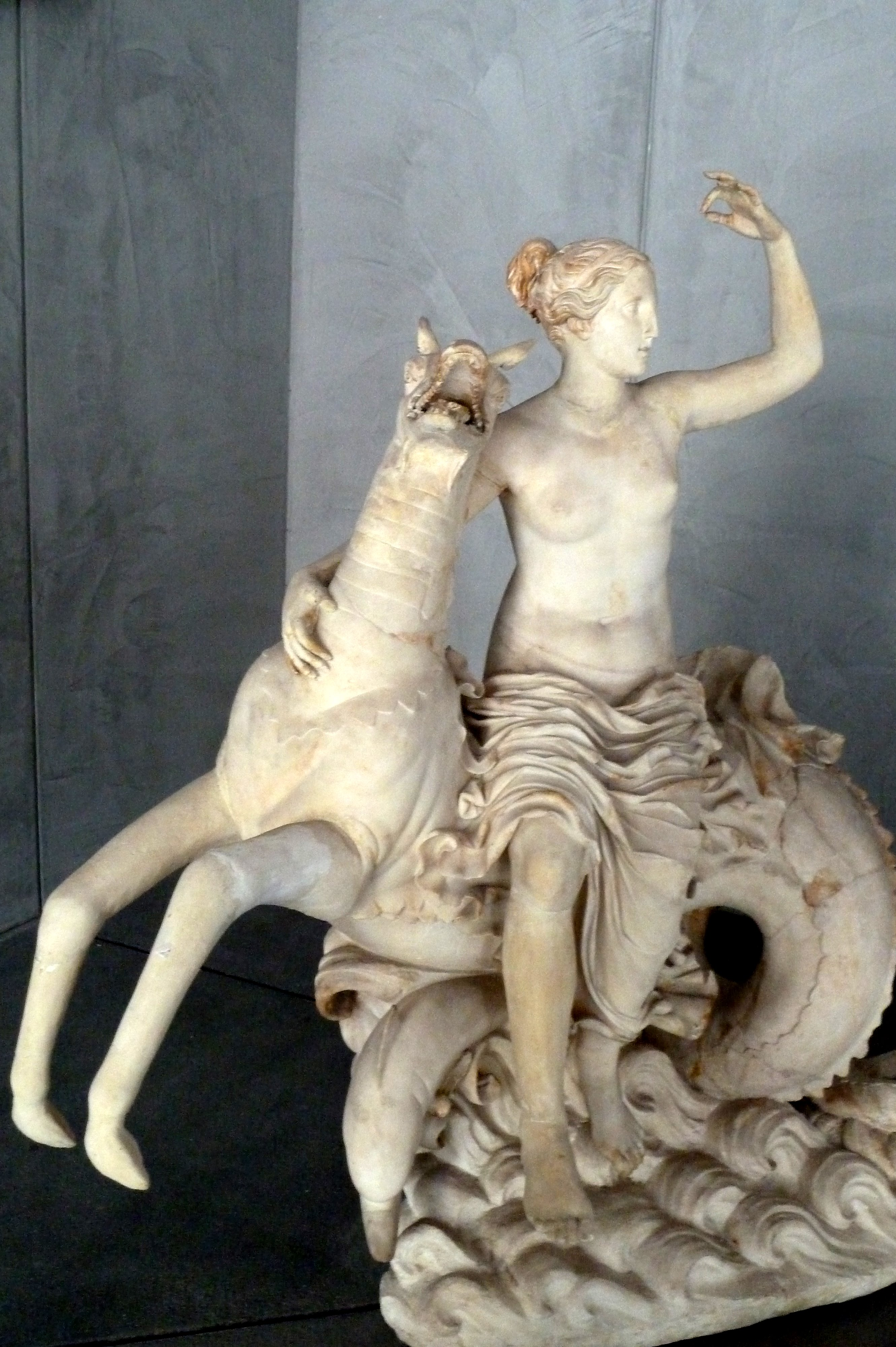
Nereid on sea monster, early 1st c. AD, from the villa of Vedius Pollio, Naples Archaeology Museum

The George Vallet Archaeological museum in Sorrento has a model of the villa.

=== Tunnel of Sejanus ===
Access for visitors to the ruins of the imperial villa is currently through the Tunnel of Sejanus.

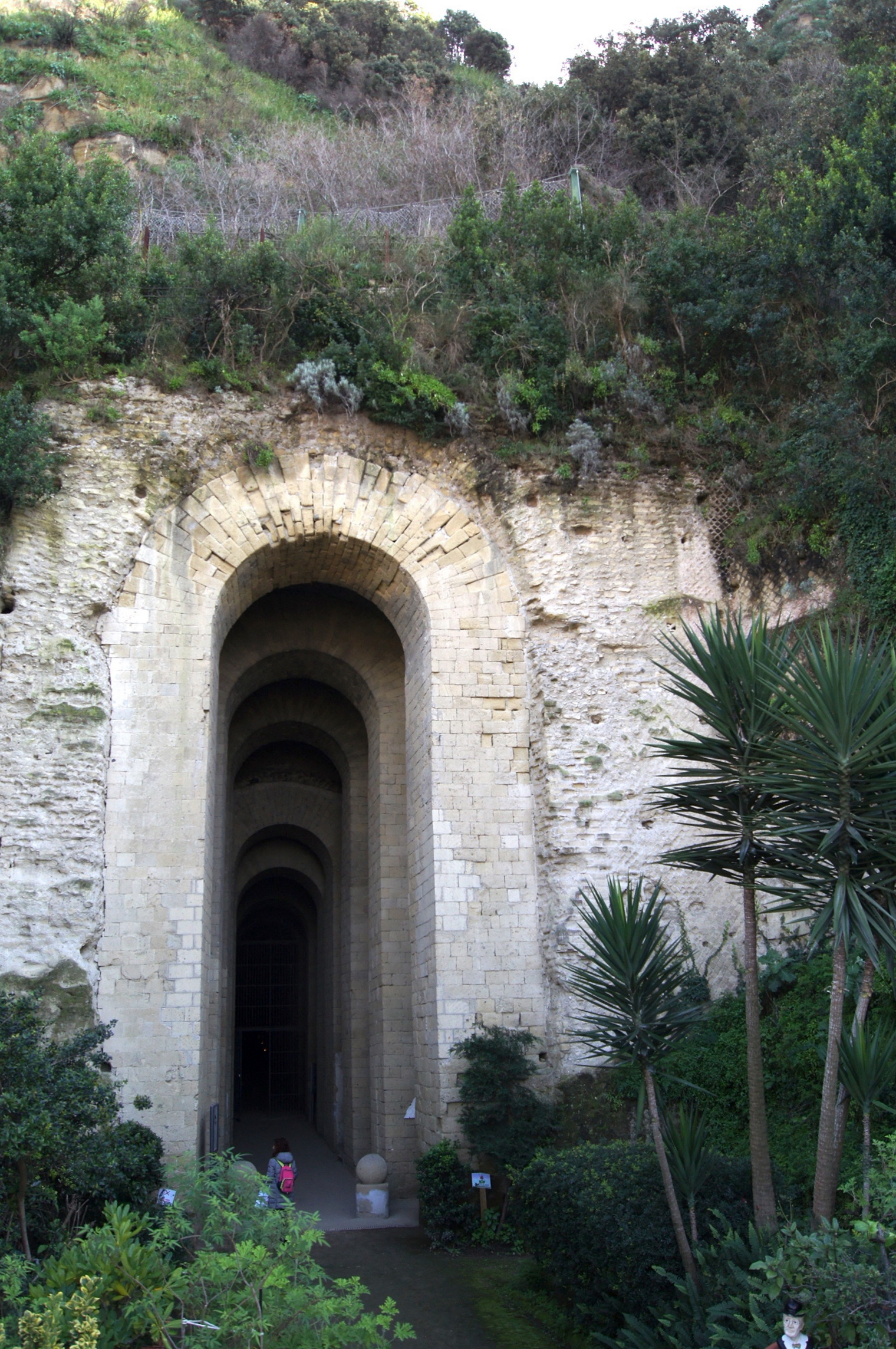
Roman Tunnel of Sejanus western end

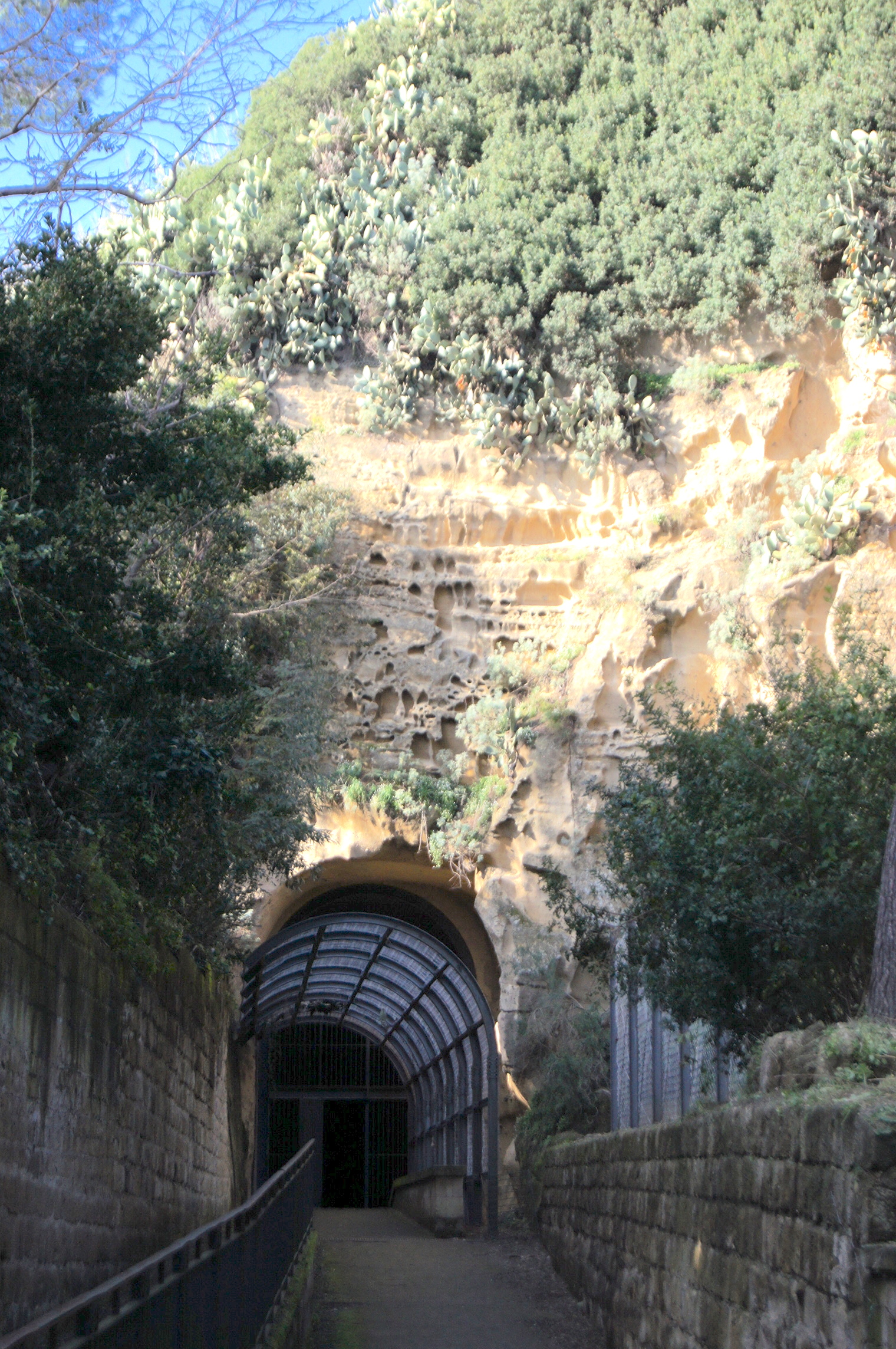
Tunnel of Sejanus eastern end

The extraordinary 770 metre-long Grotta di Seiano or "cave of Sejanus" passes beneath the Posillipo hill and connected the imperial villa and other patrician villas nearby with the Phlegraean Fields and the towns and ports of Puteoli (Pozzuoli) and Cumae. It owes its name to Lucius Aelius Seianus (Sejanus), prefect of the emperor Tiberius, who according to tradition commissioned its enlargement in the first century AD; the first tunnel was built 50 years earlier by architect Cocceius Auctus at the behest of Agrippa. The eastern entrance is cut into the rock cliff within the archaeological park while the western entrance was a monumental arch with opus reticulatum lining the cliff sides, and both ends being of about 14 m height.

The height, width and length of the tunnel made it a great engineering achievement and an extravagant one considering it served only a small population. An enormous volume of rock alone had to be removed though some served as building material for the villas. The tunnelling was complicated by the alternation of pozzolanic earth with tufa necessitating the elaborate lining of most of the tunnel with stonework of opus reticulatum and then with vaulting on top of these walls. Work progressed at 5–7 m per day as indicated by the joints between sections. It was not perfectly straight in plan but included small deviations near the centre where the tunnellers from each end met after remarkably small inaccuracies of alignment given the techniques of the time. It had three secondary side tunnels ending in openings overhanging the bay to provide light and ventilation.

Although known about by scholars (for example it is referred to in the Polish writer Adam Mickiewicz's epic Pan Tadeusz published in 1834), it had fallen into disuse over the centuries. it was rediscovered during works for a new road in 1841 and immediately brought to light and made passable by Ferdinand II of the Two Sicilies, becoming a tourist destination. Additional lining and arches were built to repair and reinforce the ancient walls. During World War II, it was used as an air raid shelter for the inhabitants of Bagnoli; the war and landslides during the 1950s took it back to a state of neglect since when it was restored.

=== Other sights ===
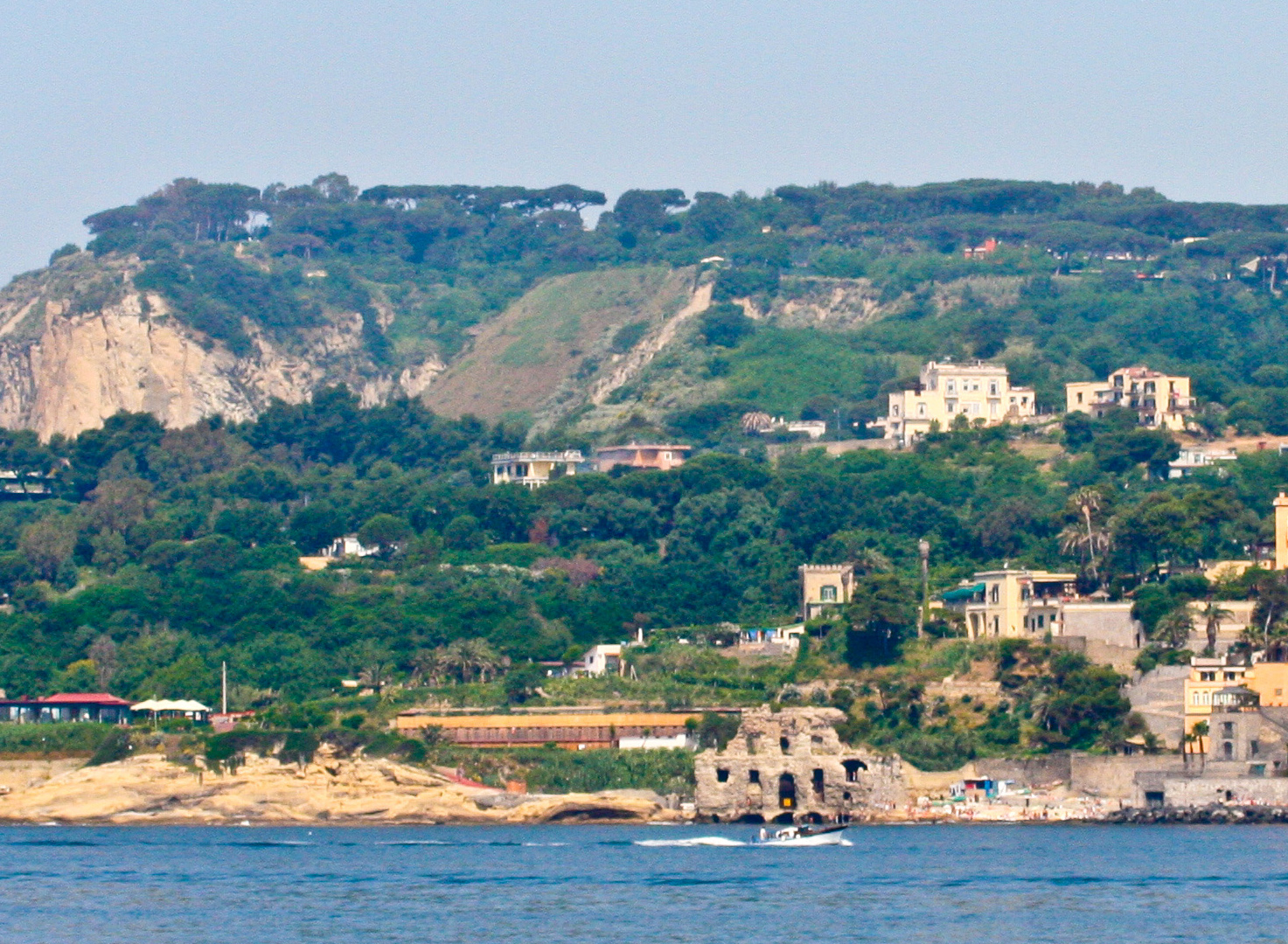
Palace of the Spirits

The remains of other Roman houses can be seen in Marechiaro along the beach, or at Calata Ponticello where there is an Ionic column base and a brick niche. On the cliff towards Gaiola are the remains of the "House of the Spirits" also called "Villarosa" which was the nymphaeum of the villa and also built in the first century BC. Further along the coast to the west is the perimeter of the "School of Virgil" where it was believed that the "prophet" practised magical arts.

The grandeur and luxury of these villas are documented in the George Vallet Archaeological museum.

The Roman aqueduct supplying the coastal villas was a branch of the Serino aqueduct or Aqua Augusta and was discovered in 1882 when the Grotta Nuova di Posillipo was made for a tramway through the hill. Ancient inscriptions found inside the tunnel verify that it fed the villa of Felix Pollio, among others, mainly intended for the nymphaeum and the baths.

== Modern developments ==
The area remained largely undeveloped until a road, via Posillipo, was built between 1812 and 1824. That road starts at sea level at the Mergellina harbour and moves up the coast, roughly parallel to the shore. The artistic School of Posillipo was started by Antonie Sminck Pitloo, painting marine shore landscapes from the area.

The submerged parts of the ruins of the imperial villa and the rich and diverse marine and coastal natural environment can be seen via boat excursions.

The area has been heavily overbuilt since the end of World War II, but contains some notable historical buildings and landmarks. Among these is the Villa Rosebery, the Italian President's residence during his stays in Naples. It also contains a Mausoleum to those who died for their country, the Mausoleo Schilizzi.

== Sports ==
Posillipo has given its name to Naples' waterpolo team, Circolo Nautico Posillipo. The neighbourhood was seat of the homonymous circuit which hosted the Grand Prix of Naples between 1933 and 1962.

== Famous residents ==
- Maradona.
- Posillipo is the birthplace of Franco Alfano, the Italian composer and pianist best known for completing Turandot.
- Franco Ambrosio, the wheat magnate, lived in Posillipo until his death in 2009. He was murdered in a robbery at his home.
- Augustus.
- George Norman Douglas (1868–1952) Scottish travel and novel writer. In 1897 lived in Villa Maya, Posillipo.
- Hadrian.
- Giambattista Basile was born in Posillipo in 1575. It is also the setting of one of his first works Le Avventurose Disavventure (The Adventurous Misadventures) published in 1611.
- Sándor Márai, the author of Embers, lived in Posillipo between 1948 and 1952; his novel "San Gennaro vére" ("Blood of San Gennaro") is set in Naples.
- It may well also have been the residence of Virgil, the Roman poet of, most famously, the 'Aeneid'.
- Vedius Pollio.
- Sigismund Thalberg.
- Domenico Barbaia, Italian opera impresario died here in 1841.
- Oscar Wilde completed "The Ballad of Reading Gaol" while residing in Posillipo in 1897.

== Gallery ==
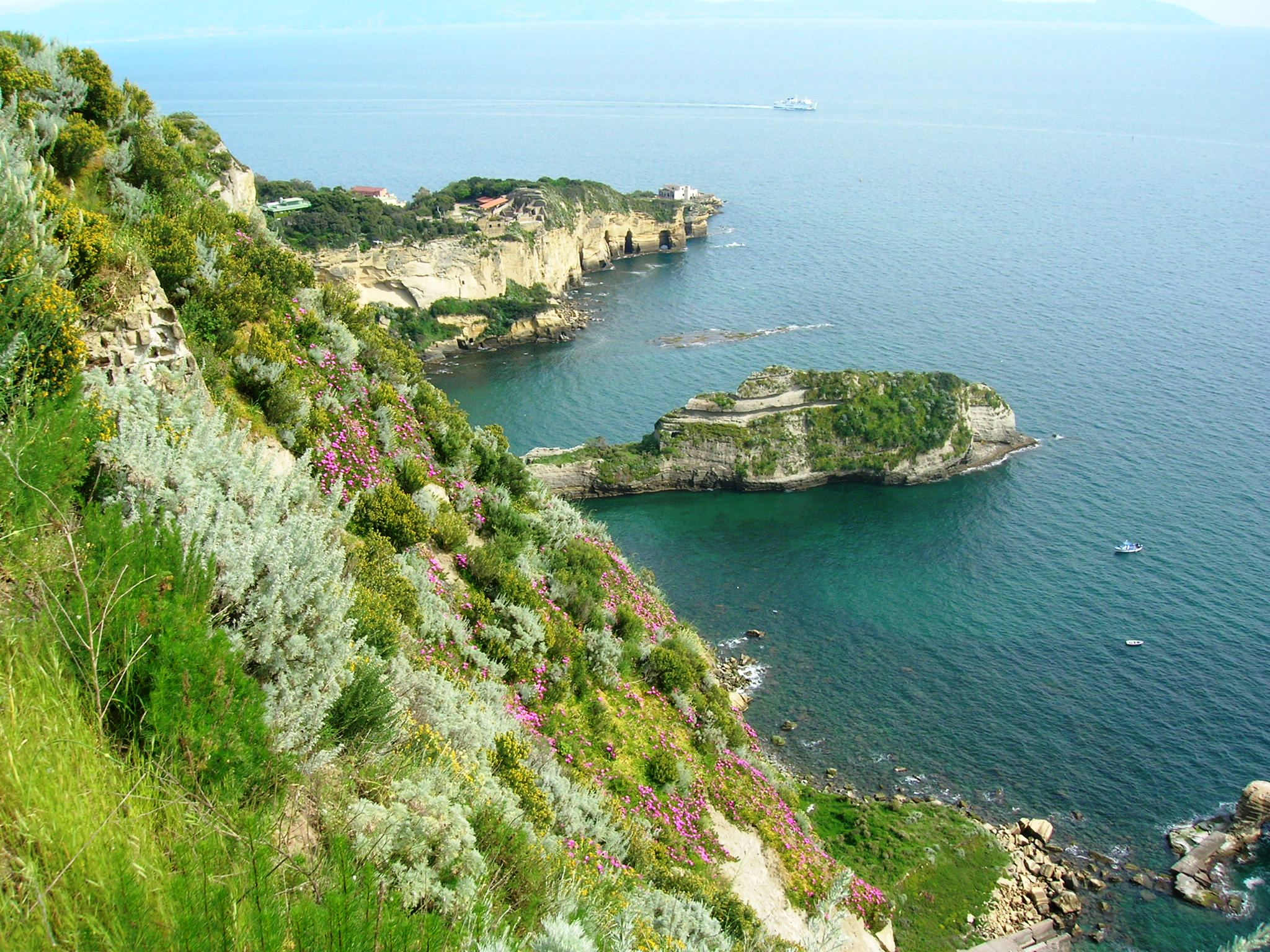
Glimpse of bay Trentaremi

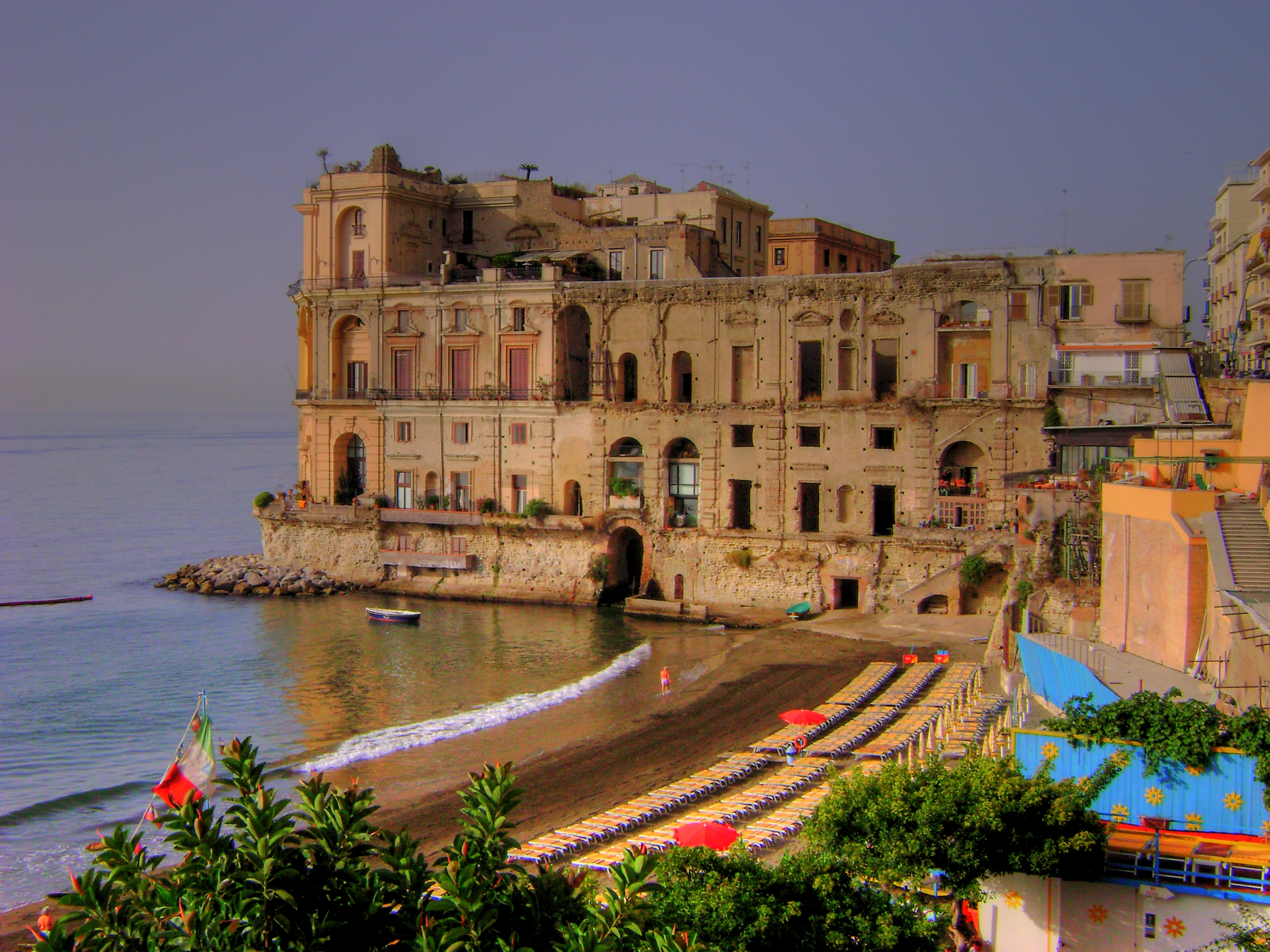
Palazzo Donn'Anna, one of the buildings on the sea

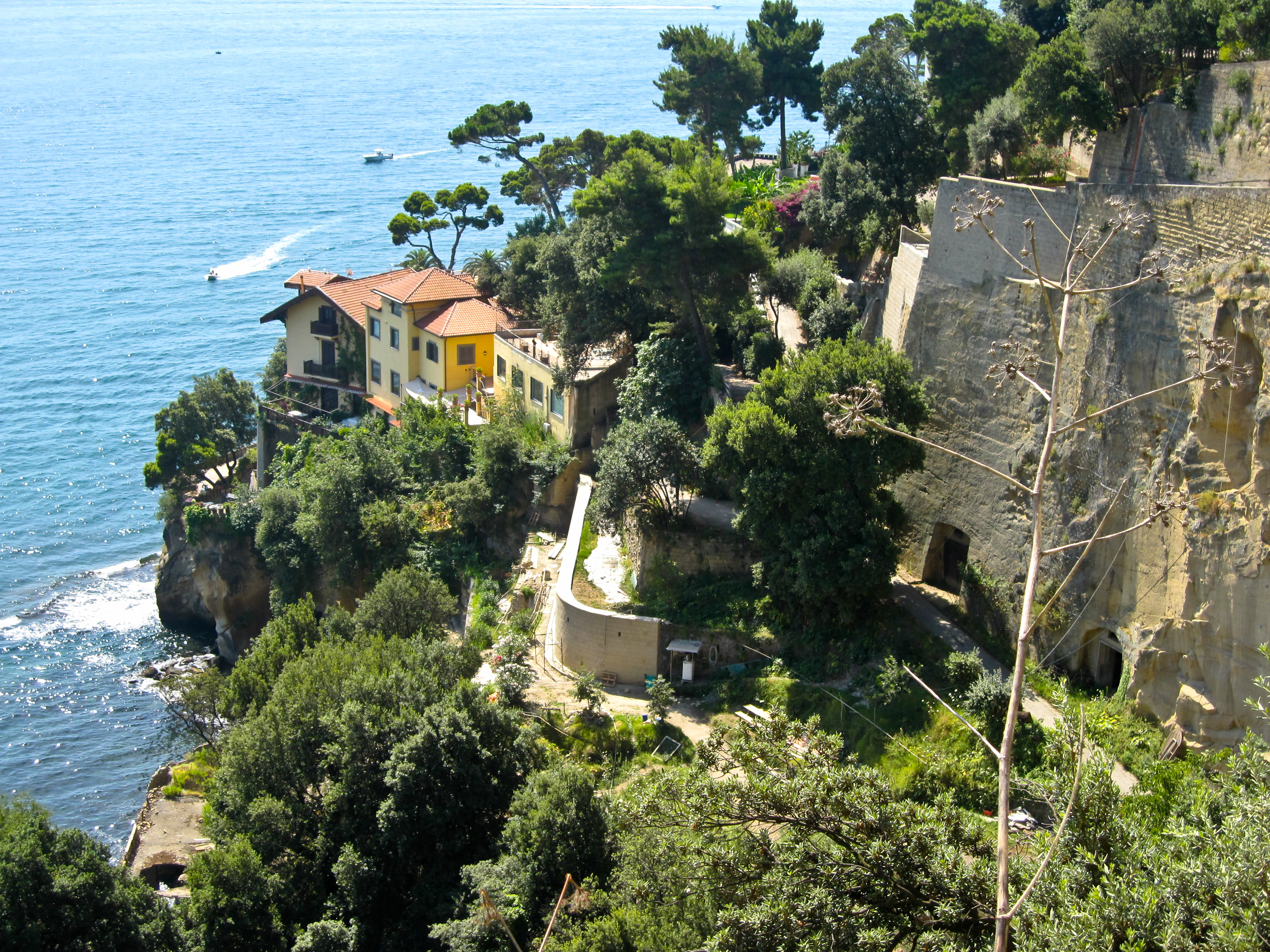
Posillipo coast from Via Posillipo

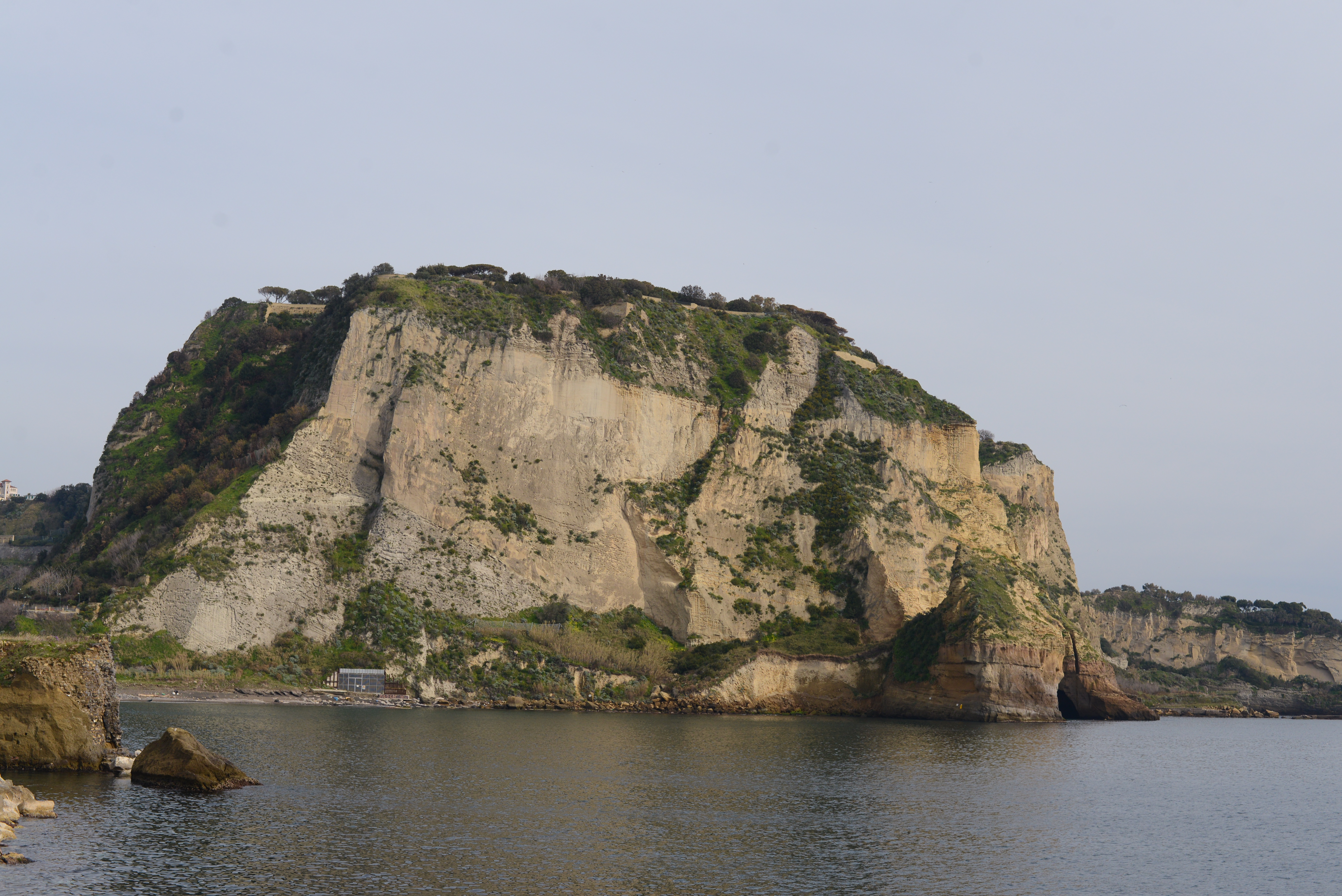
Cape Posillipo

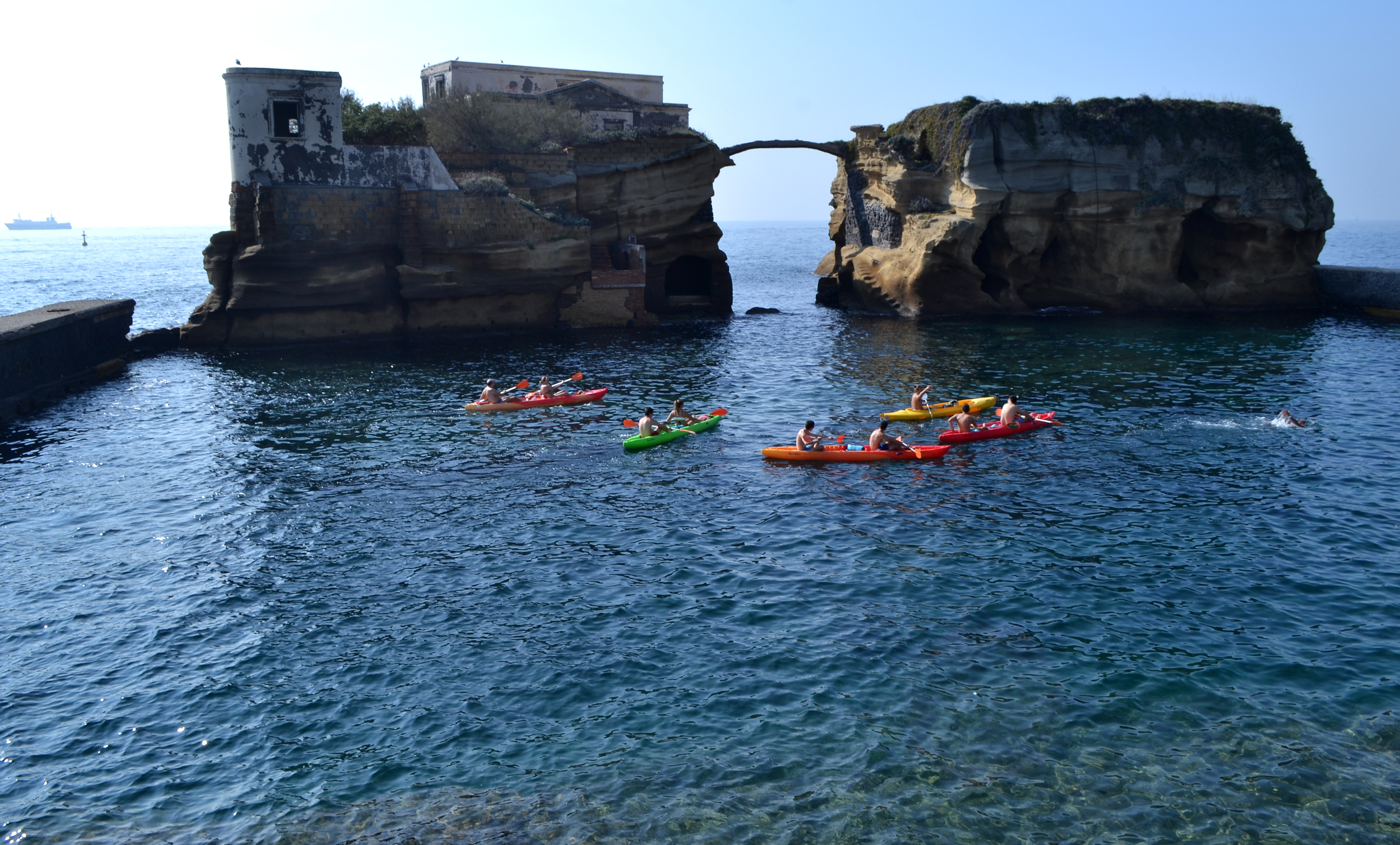
The islet of Gaiola

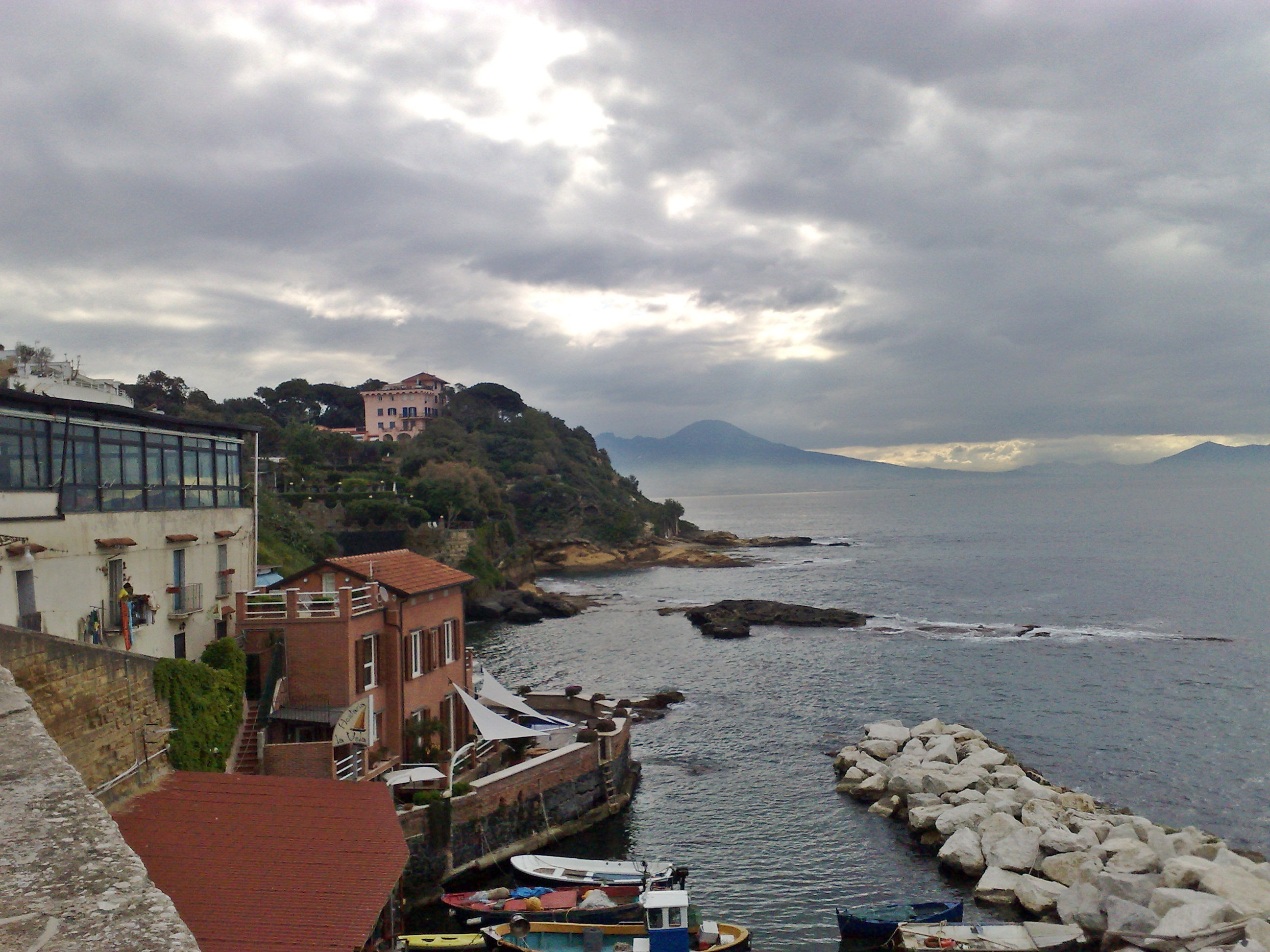
Scoglione di Marechiaro

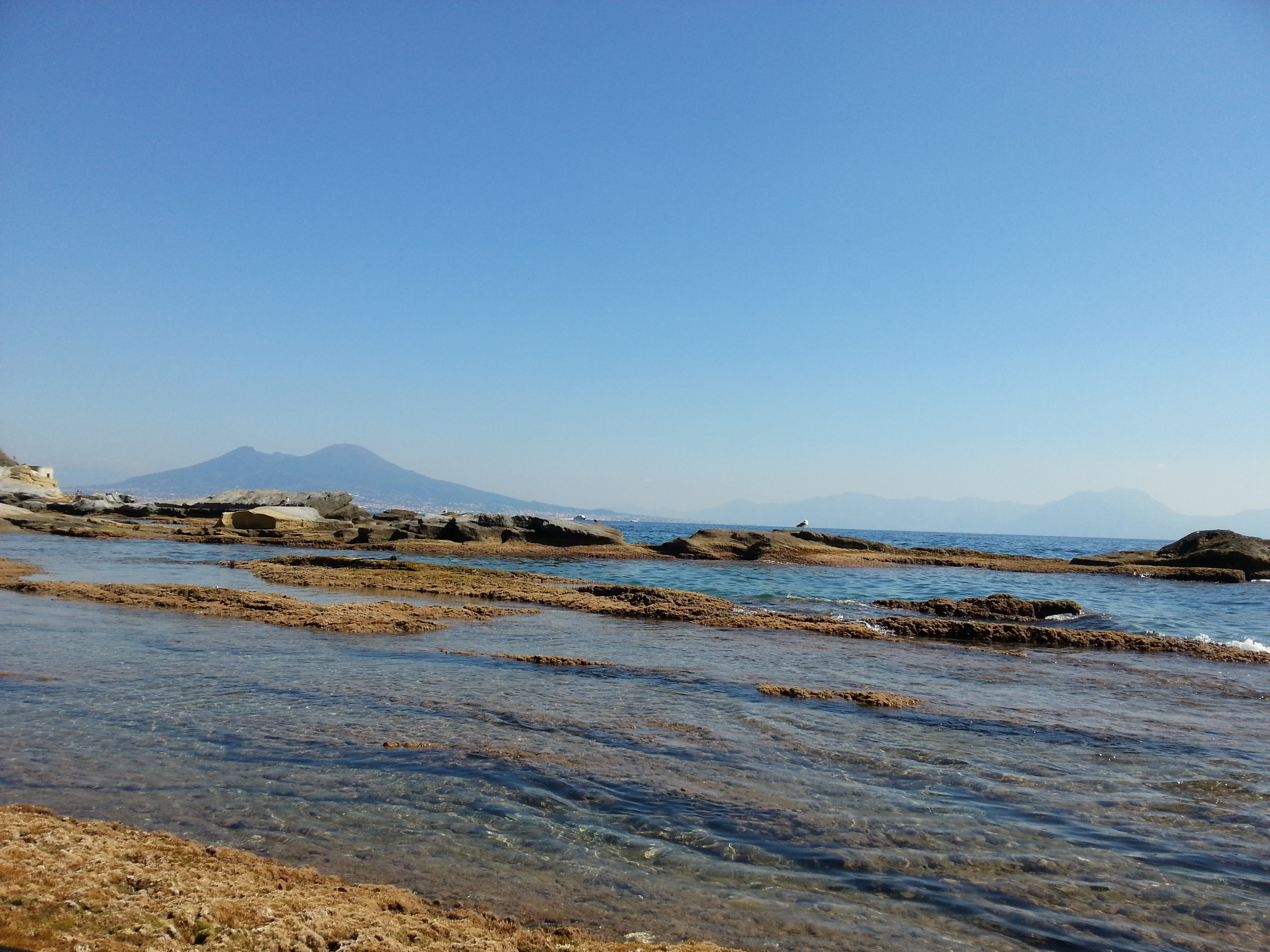
Scoglione di Marechiaro

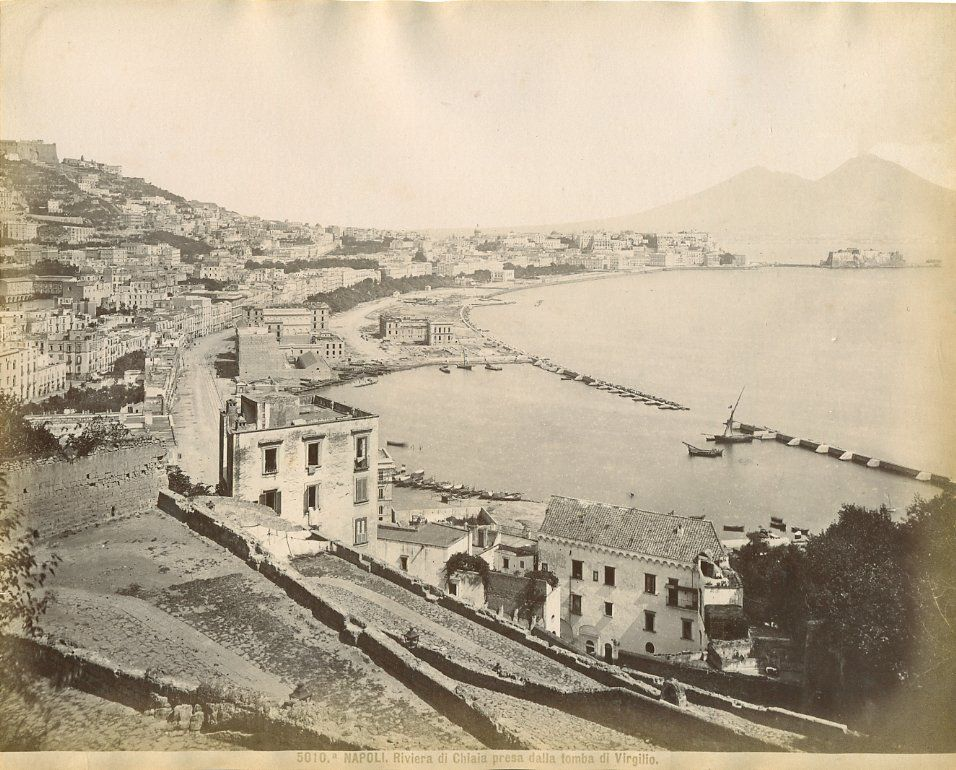
The Rampe di Sant'Antonio

== See also ==
- San Strato a Posillipo (1266), built atop the remains of a Greco-Roman temple
- Santa Maria del Faro, a church in the quartiere of Posillipo of Naples
