= Mausoleo Schilizzi =

Mausoleum in Naples, Italy

Coordinates: 40.805370°N 14.201954°E

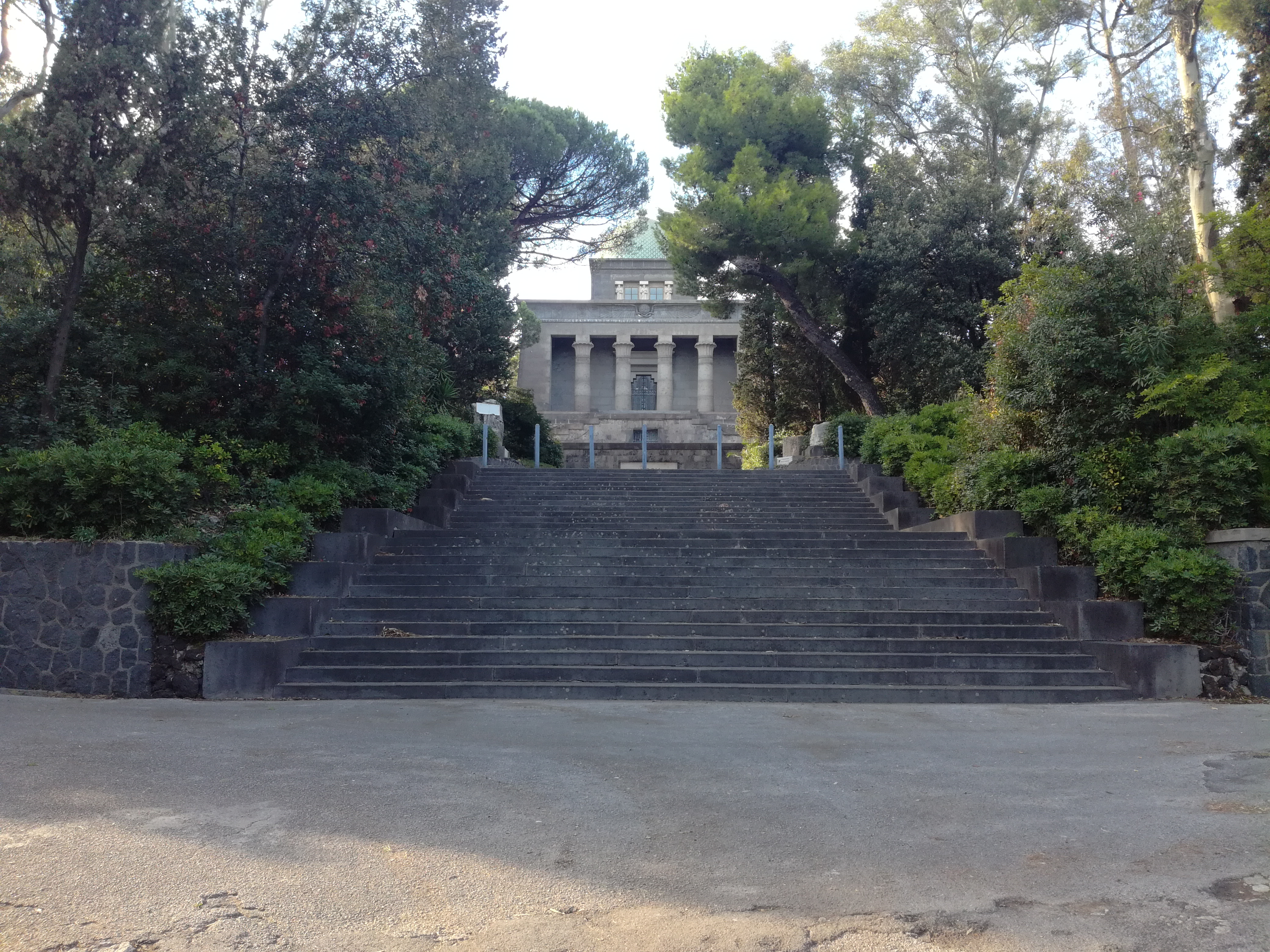
Mausoleum from via Posillipo gate.

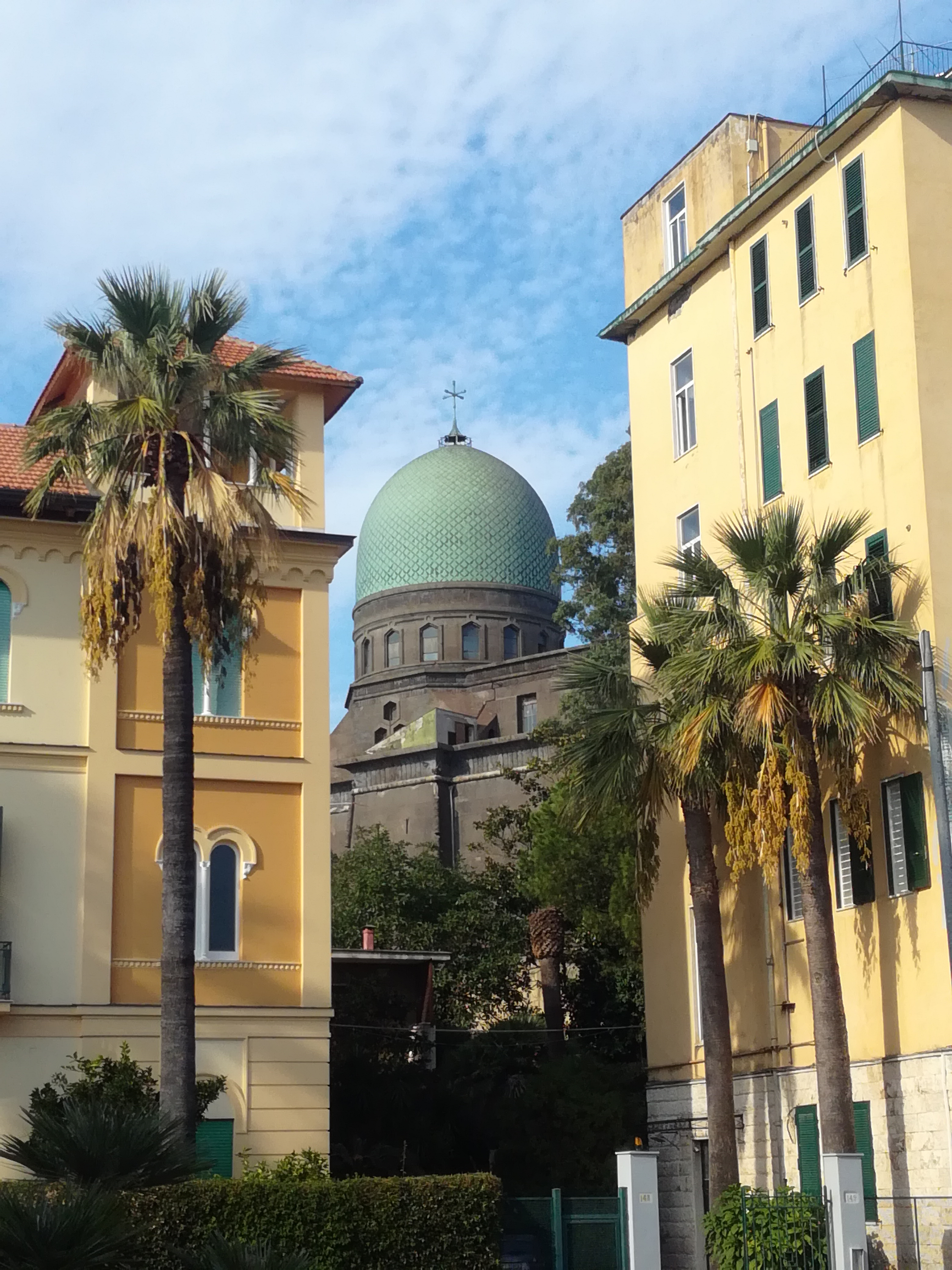
The dome.

The Mausoleo Schilizzi (Schilizzi Mausoleum), also known as the Mausoleum of Posillipo or Ara Votiva per i Caduti della Patria, is a monumental mausoleum built in the 1880s in a Neo-Egyptian style. It is located at Posillipo, Naples, and overlooks the bay from atop a hillside.

== History ==
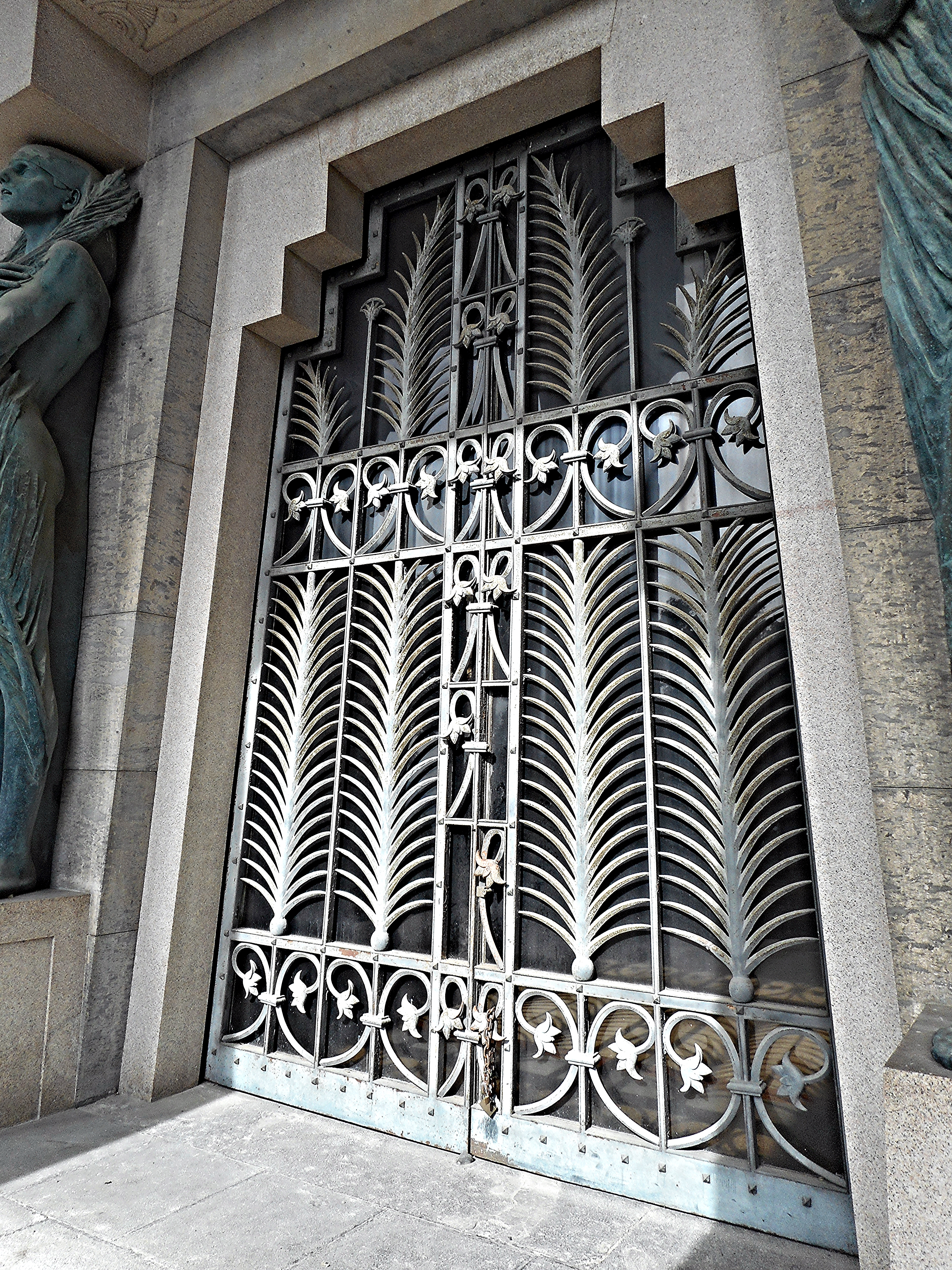
Iron gate

The Mausoleum was commissioned by the wealthy banker Matteo Schilizzi as a mausoleum to be placed in the Cemetery of Poggioreale, and the designs were by Alfonso Guerra. By the 1920s, the building was bought by the municipality, moved to the present site, and to serve as a mausoleum for soldiers and patriots. The work was completed by Alfonso's son, Camillo. The Caryatids at the entrance are by Giovanni Battista Amendola.
