= San Strato a Posillipo =

Coordinates: 40.8043°N 14.1934°E

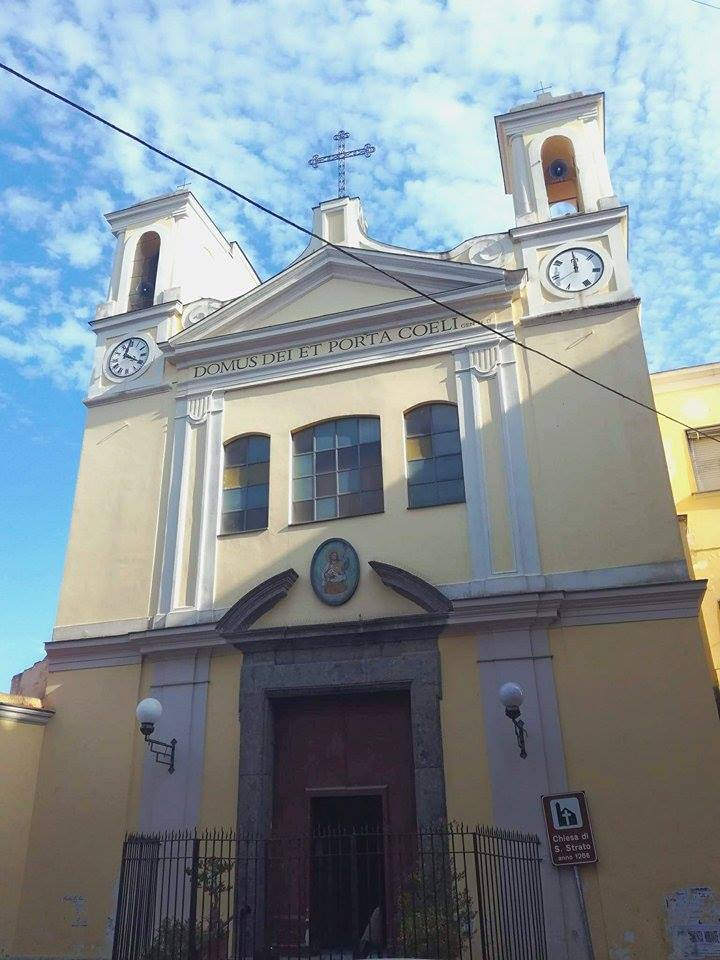
- San Strato a Posillipo
- Location: Naples
- Country: Italy
- Denomination: Roman Catholic

Architecture
- Architectural type: Church

Administration
- Diocese: Roman Catholic Archdiocese of Naples

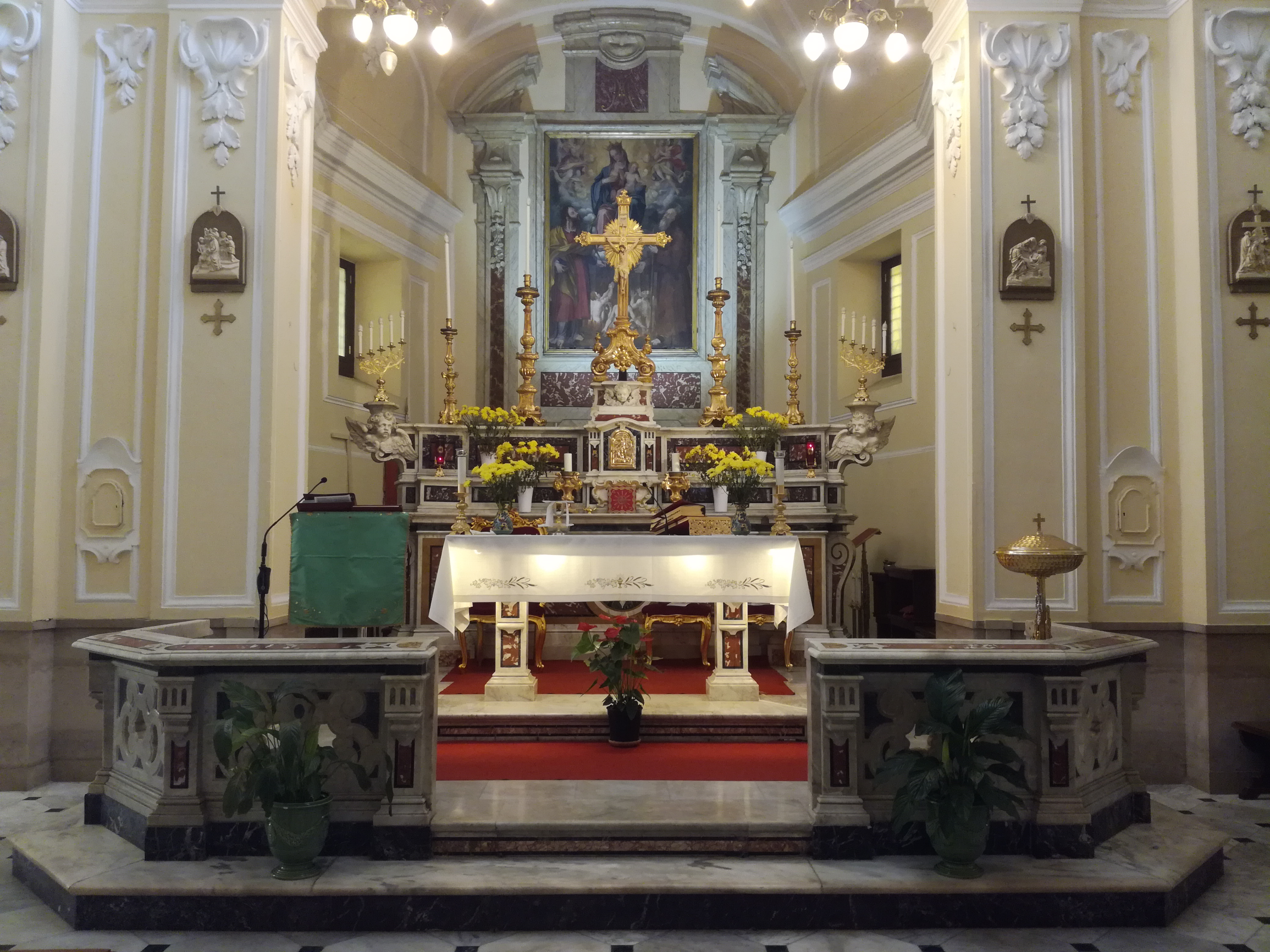
Main altar.

San Strato a Posillipo is a parish church in the Posillipo neighborhood of Naples, Italy.

The church was founded in 1266 by commission from Greek orthodox converts, and built atop the remains of a Greco-Roman temple. In 1572, the church was rebuilt. Further reconstructions occurred in the 18th century, and after earthquakes in 1930 and 1980. The wooden statue of San Strato was completed by Giacomo Colombo, a pupil of Francesco Solimena. The church was closed to cult till 1982, as the church underwent restoration.
