= Rampe di Sant'Antonio a Posillipo =

- 'E tridice scese ("the thirteen descents"); tredici discese di Sant'Antonio
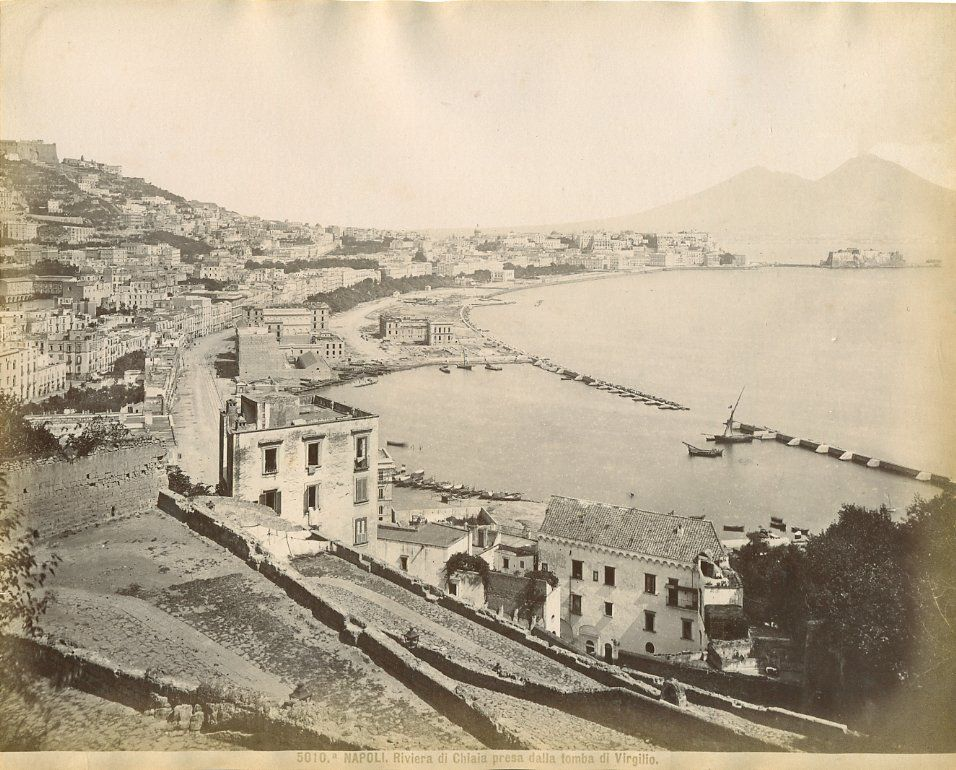
- View of Posillipo in 1873. The Rampe di Sant'Antonio can be seen at the lower left.
- Interactive map of Rampe di Sant'Antonio a Posillipo
- Former name: Salita di Santa Maria delle Grazie
- Namesake: Saint Anthony
- Type: Steps
- Location: Naples, Italy
- Arrondissement: Municipality I
- Quarter: Posillipo
- Postal code: 80122
- Nearest metro station: Mergellina funicular (Sant'Antonio stop), Line 2 and Line 6 (Mergellina stop)
- From: Piazza Sannazaro
- Major junctions: Via Pacuvio
- To: Church of Sant'Antonio a Posillipo (via Minucio Felice)

Construction
- Construction start: 17th century

The Rampe di Sant'Antonio a Posillipo, called in Neapolitan 'e tridice scese (the thirteen descents), are a stepped path in the Posillipo quarter of Naples that connects Piazza Sannazaro, near Mergellina, to the Church of Sant'Antonio a Posillipo and to via Pacuvio.

== History ==
The route follows an ancient road of Greco-Roman origin that connected the district of Chiaia and Mergellina with the rural hamlets of the Posillipo hill, chiefly that of Porta Posillipo. In the modern era the track was known as the salita di Santa Maria delle Grazie, and it appears under the name "strada e discese di Posillipo" on the Duke of Noja's map, and is also documented on the maps of Bulifon from 1685 and of Petrini from 1698. In 1603 the widening began of the road leading to the convent, in the course of which stretches of ancient Roman paving were preserved; from that time the route began to be referred to as the Rampe di Sant'Antonio a Posillipo.

The works took place during a period of great hardship for Naples, marked by the 1631 eruption of Vesuvius and by recurring epidemics. In 1642 friars of the Third Order of Saint Francis founded, in an area then occupied by a few farmhouses, a small church with an adjoining convent dedicated to Saint Anthony, which originally also served as a sanatorium. In 1643 the viceroy Ramiro Felipe Núñez de Guzmán, Duke of Medina de las Torres, had the route further improved to ease access for pilgrims heading to the sanctuary; a plaque with a Latin inscription, placed on the first ramp, still commemorates the intervention today.

Over the following decades the convent was enlarged and the church, which took on a single-nave form with three chapels on each side, was granted the title of Antonine sanctuary; the sacristy was begun in 1750, the rectangular bell tower with its Baroque spire was completed four years later, and the cloister, built at the wish of the Franciscan friar Paolo Anzalone, was finished in 1775. Besides its religious function, the ramps served as a link between the hamlets on the hill, mostly given over to farming, and the coast, where the fishermen of Mergellina exchanged their catch for the produce of the land.

During the twentieth century the final stretch of the original route, which had continued toward the hamlet of Porta Posillipo, was erased by the opening of via Pacuvio and via Stazio and by the gradual urbanisation of the area; the straight final stretch of via Stazio nonetheless follows the ancient track and meets, at the junction with via Manzoni, via Porta Posillipo. The panoramic square in front of the church was laid out between the 1960s and 1970s.

== Description ==
The ramps unfold along narrow streets with steep hairpin bends that make the climb demanding even by car; despite the name, an actual count of the bends shows fourteen rather than thirteen. At the top of the path lies the Terrazza di Sant'Antonio, one of the city's best-known scenic viewpoints, also reachable from via Minucio Felice, from which the view takes in the whole Gulf of Naples, Vesuvius, the Sorrentine Peninsula and the island of Capri, with Mergellina visible at the foot of the hill.

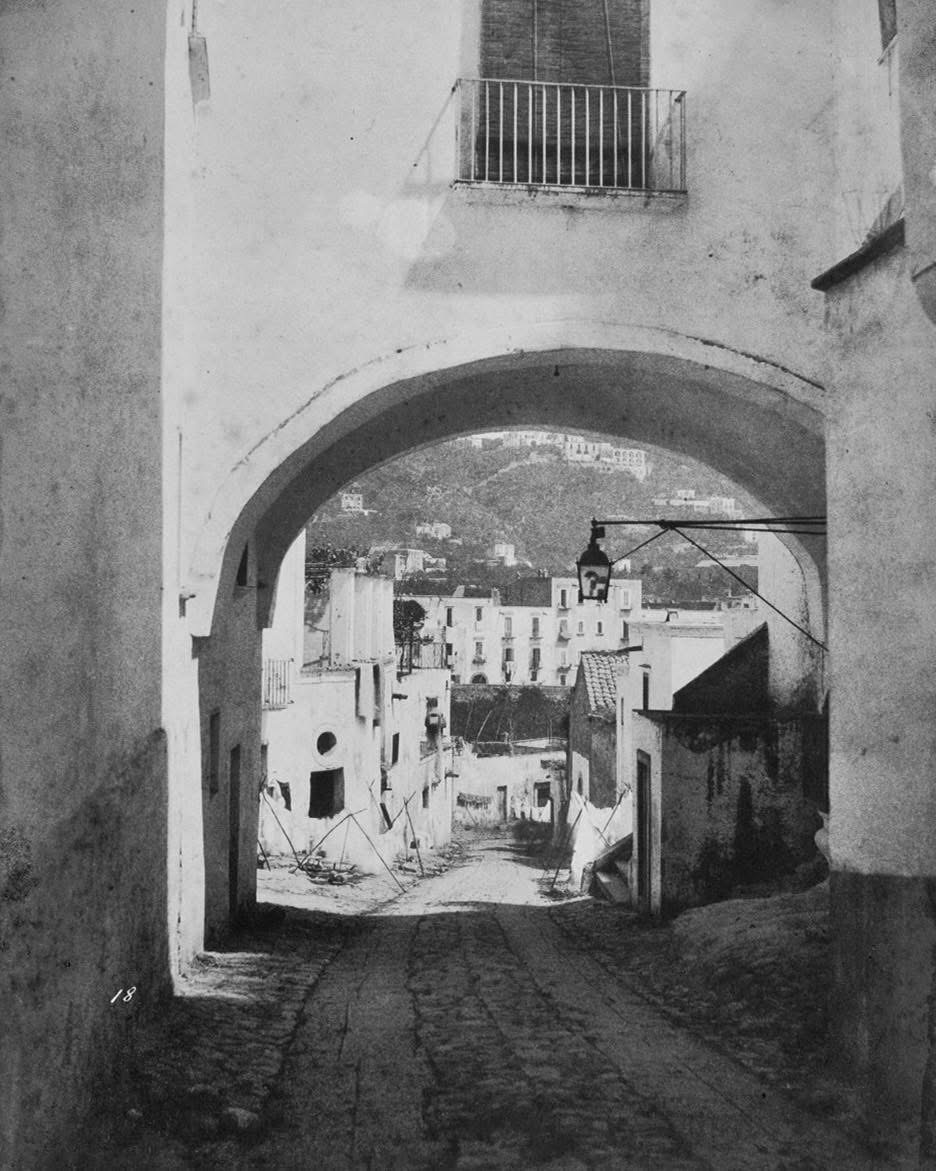
The third ramp of Sant'Antonio, in an 1853 photograph by Firmin Eugène Le Dien.

For the quality of its view the spot has repeatedly been used as a setting for films, advertisements and television productions, becoming a recurring image of the city while remaining, unlike other Neapolitan viewpoints, little frequented by tourists and known chiefly to the residents of the area.

== See also ==
- Posillipo

== Bibliography ==
- Napoli e dintorni, Touring Club Italiano, Touring Editore, Rome 2008.
- Vittorio Gleijeses, La storia di Napoli, Società Editrice Napoletana, Naples 1978.
