= Vedius Pollio =

Roman equestrian during the reign of Augustus

Publius Vedius Pollio
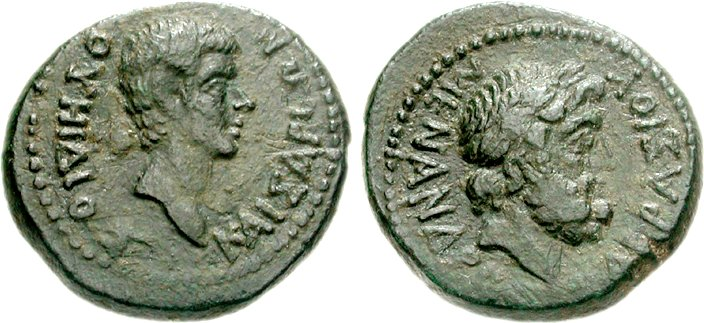
- Coin depicting Vedius Pollio (left)
- Born: 1st century BC
- Died: 15 BC

Publius Vedius Pollio (died 15 BC) was a Roman of equestrian rank, and a friend of the Roman emperor Augustus, who appointed him to a position of authority in the province of Asia. In later life, he became infamous for his luxurious tastes and cruelty to his slaves – when they displeased him, he had them fed to "lampreys" (Note: Many sources cite lampreys, a type of parasitic fish, while others have pointed out the creatures were likely moray eels, not lampreys, and the confusion arose from a translation of the ancient Greek-written manuscript Roman History by Greco-Roman historian Cassius Dio into English by Clay.) that he maintained for that purpose, which was deemed to be an exceedingly cruel act. When Vedius tried to apply this method of execution to a slave who broke a crystal cup, Emperor Augustus (Pollio's guest at the time) was so appalled that he not only intervened to prevent the execution but had all of Pollio's valuable drinking vessels deliberately broken. This incident, and Augustus's demolition of Vedius's mansion in Rome, which Augustus inherited in Vedius's will, were frequently referred to in antiquity in discussions of ethics and of the public role of Augustus.

== Biography ==
Publius Vedius Pollio, the son of a freedman, was born in the 1st century BC and attained membership of the equestrian order.

Vedius Pollio's first certain appearance in historical sources comes after Octavian (later Augustus) became sole ruler of the Roman world in 31 BC; at some point Vedius held authority in the province of Asia on behalf of the emperor. For a mere equestrian to govern this province was anomalous, and there were presumably special circumstances; Vedius's term of office could have been in 31–30 BC before the appointment of a regular proconsular governor, or after a major earthquake in 27 BC. He later returned to Rome.

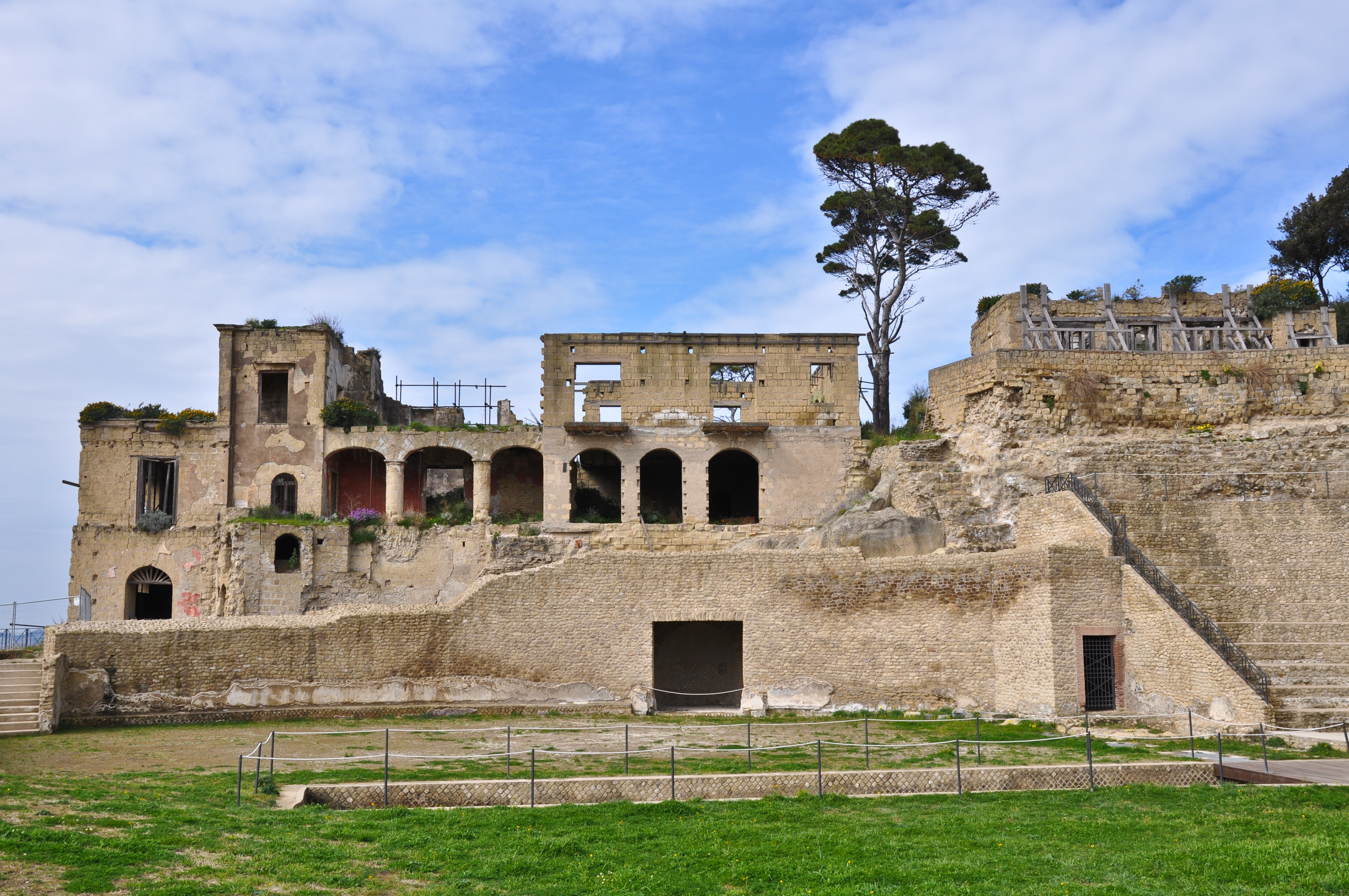
Villa of Vedius Pollio, Posillipo

Despite these services to the state, it was for his reputed luxury and cruelty that Vedius would become best known. He owned a massive villa at Posillipo on the Gulf of Naples. Most notoriously, he kept a pool of lampreys into which slaves who incurred his displeasure would be thrown as food.

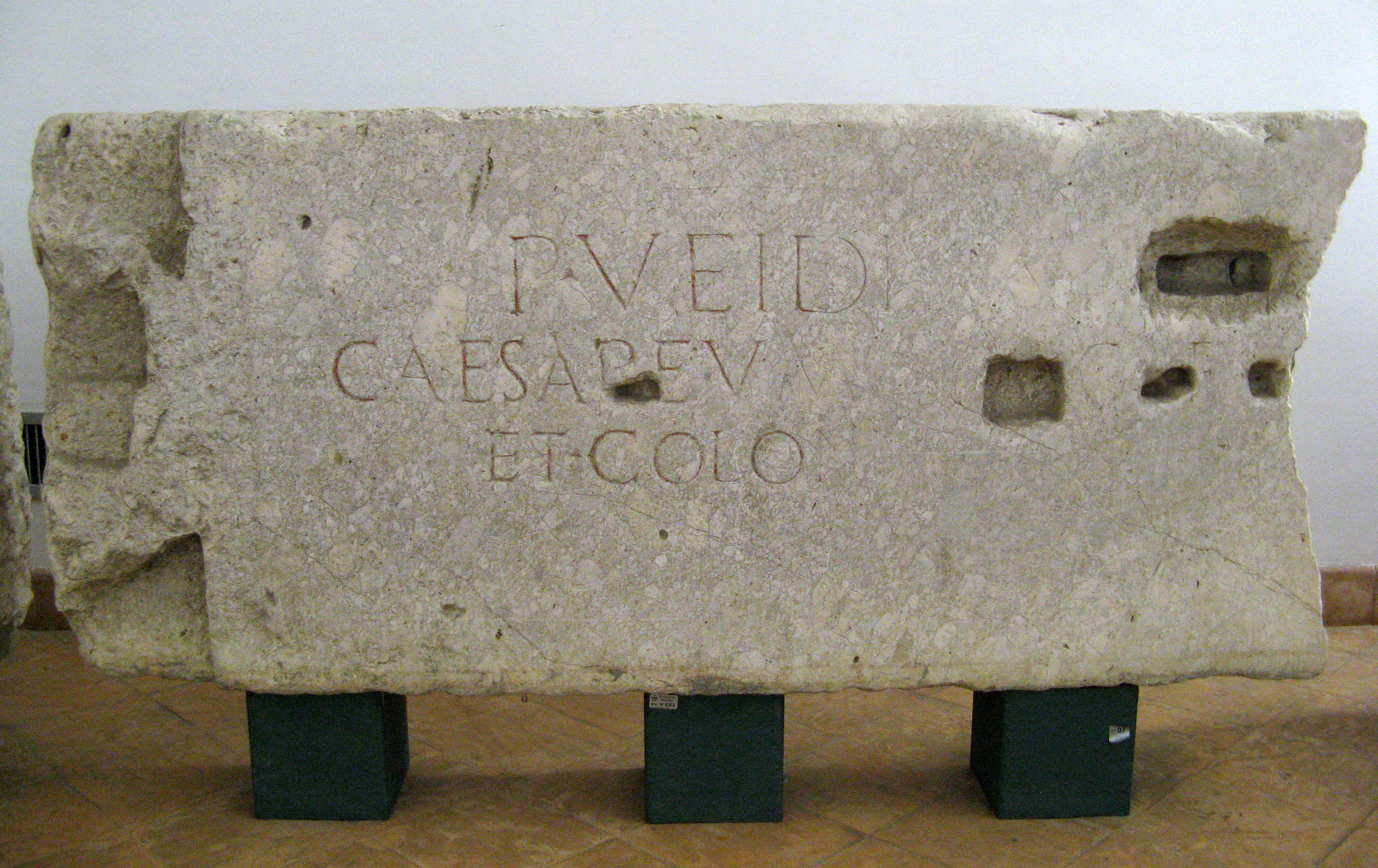
Inscription recording Pollio's dedication of the Caesareum at Beneventum (CIL IX 1556)

Nevertheless, he retained, at least for a while, the friendship of Augustus, in whose honour he built a shrine or monument at Beneventum. On one occasion, Augustus was dining at Vedius's home when a cup-bearer broke a crystal glass. Vedius ordered him thrown to the lampreys, but the slave fell to his knees before Augustus and pleaded to be executed in some more humane way. Horrified, the emperor had all of Vedius's expensive glasses smashed and the pool filled in. According to Seneca, Augustus also had the slave freed; Dio merely remarks that Vedius "could not punish his servant for what Augustus also had done".

There are a number of less certain appearances that may be the same Vedius Pollio. A Vidius or Vedius, possibly the same, is mentioned in a letter of 46 BC as involved in a dispute with the scholar-politician Curtius Nicias. As well, Ronald Syme suggests that the "Publius Vedius" who appears in Cicero's letters as a friend of Pompey may also be Vedius Pollio. Cicero, governor of Cilicia, was travelling near Laodicea in 50 BC, when Publius Vedius met him with a large retinue, and several wild asses and a baboon in a chariot. Unimpressed, Cicero wrote to Atticus, "I never saw a more worthless man." About this possible Vedius Pollio, Cicero adds a further anecdote: Publius Vedius, earlier, had left some items with Vindulus, who meanwhile had died. Vindulus's heir later examined the items and found five portrait-busts of married ladies, including Junia Secunda. Cicero took these to be trophies of Vedius's sexual conquests, and, while highly praising her publicly, in correspondence he criticized her for the indiscretion and her husband and brother for their lack of awareness of her conduct. But an affair, if it did occur, may have been with a sister, Junia Prima.

Vedius died in 15 BC. Among his many heirs, Augustus received a large part of Vedius's estate, including his villa at Posillipo, along with instructions to erect a suitable monument on the site. The emperor demolished at least part of Pollio's house in Rome, described by the poet Ovid as "like a city", and constructed in its place a colonnade, the Porticus of Livia in honour of his wife, which he dedicated in 7 BC.

== Legacy ==
Vedius's treatment of his slaves and Augustus's conduct towards him became popular subjects for anecdotes in antiquity. During or shortly after Augustus's reign, Ovid praised his demolition of Vedius's house as a grand statement against immoral luxury made even at the emperor's own cost. Scott notes that in replacing the house with a public monument Augustus merely "carried out the terms of the will", and argues that any suggestion he wished to censure Vedius's memory may have been mere "gossip".

Also in the 1st century AD, Vedius's story was used by the philosopher Seneca the Younger and the encyclopedist Pliny the Elder. In two ethical treatises, Seneca used Vedius's treatment of the cup-bearer and Augustus's response to illustrate the extremes to which anger could lead and the need for clemency. Pliny the Elder mentioned Vedius's lampreys in his Natural History while treating varieties of fish, noting the man's friendship with Augustus while ignoring the story of the latter's clemency. Pliny was no admirer of Augustus and his handling of the story has been seen as "a gratuitous jibe" at the emperor. In a highly rhetorical passage, the Christian writer Tertullian stated that after executing slaves, Vedius had his lampreys "cooked straight away, so that in their entrails he himself might have a taste of his slaves' bodies too".

In several works, Adam Smith cited Augustus's intervention to save the cup-bearer in support of an argument that the condition of slaves was better under a monarchy than a democracy. He embellished the story by claiming that Augustus manumitted all of Vedius's slaves, a statement not based on any ancient source, in one 1763 lecture even estimating the value of the property their master thus lost.
