= The Sculpture Gallery =

The Sculpture Gallery (1875), by Lawerence Alma-Tadema, Oil on Canvas, 30 ¼ x 23 ¼ in

The Sculpture Gallery (1875) is an oil on canvas painting sized 30 ¼ x 23 ¼ in by Dutch classical painter Lawrence Alma-Tadema. It is a smaller version of his painting The Sculpture Gallery (1874) held at the Hood Museum of Art. It is currently on display at the Memorial Art Gallery in Rochester, New York as a part of its permanent collection.

== The Artist ==
Lawrence Alma-Tadema was a London-based artist born on January 8, 1836, in Dronrijp, Netherlands and died on June 24, 1912, in Wiesbaden, Germany. He encountered Greek and Latin writers in his education as a young boy and later inspired his art work.

When he was sixteen years old, Alma-Tadema entered the Royal Academy of Fine Arts in Antwerp where he studied under school director Gustav Wappers from 1852-1858. During his time there, he also assisted painter and printmaker Baron Henry Ley's in his studio. Ley's, similar to Alma-Tadema, painted scenes of the past, focusing primarily on medieval Europe.

Alma-Tandem's paintings gained traction in Britain and he became known for his immersive renderings of classical Greece and Rome. His paintings not only displayed his "academic" style, but also historical accuracy. Of the classical painters of that time, Alma-Tadema was the only one to paint archaeological domestic genre. He achieved this by collecting professional photographs of artifacts that he would then use while he was painting. Many of his works depict scenes of the Imperial era of Rome, often featuring a reference to the first emperor of Rome, Emperor Augustus.

The Sculpture Gallery cemented Alma-Tadema as one of the greatest classicist painters of victorian England. There are two versions of The Sculpture Gallery in circulation. The original, painted in 1874, is held in the Hood Museum of Art. The smaller version in the Memorial Art Gallery was commissioned by Ernest Gambart in 1874. Gambart, a highly influential british art dealer, was an important facet in Alma-Tadema's career as an artist. Not only did he introduce Alma-Tadema's work to the British art market, he also encouraged the Dutchmen to establish himself in London where he became his sole art dealer.

== The Painting ==
The painting depicts six spectators gathered around a bronze sculpture of the mythological sea monster Scylla. The spectators are dressed in elaborate togas. By the striking difference in his dress compared to the others, the man on the right most side of the painting should not be grouped in with the spectators. His head is shaved, whereas the male spectators are not, and he is shirtless, only clothed with a rectangular piece of fabric at his waist and fastened by a wide belt. The solid gold plaque necklace around his neck juxtaposes his simple dress.

Surrounding the spectators is a multitude of other sculptures and intricately designed pedestals. On the right is a sculpture of placed on the back wall which has a Latin inscription etched onto its surface. It reads:

TI·CAESAR

DIVI AVG·F

AVGVSTVS

IMP.VIII

Based on other similar statute bases of the time, it can be assumed that the full inscription would read:

TI(BERIVS)·CAESAR

DIVI AVG(VSTI)·F(ILIVS)

AVGVSTVS

IMP(ERATOR). VIII

Tiberius Ceaser son of Divine Augustus, Imperator for the eight time.

In the background are many marble copies of greek sculptures made by Roman artists.

The elaborate door frame of the Building of Eumachia located in Pompeii, Italy. His first trip to Pompeii ignited Alma-Tadema's early fascination with Pompeiian antiquity as well as his interest in the rest of Ancient Rome and Greece. On the left, almost cut out of the painting is Infant Hercules Struggling with a Snake, a marble version of the 16th-century AD bronze attributed to Italian sculptor Guglilmo Delle Porta currently held at the Capodimonti Museum in Naples. The statue rests on a 4th-century BC column drum from the Temple of Artemis at Ephesus. Below the infant Hercules is a marble bust of Pericles. Seated on the right is Agrippina. The marble table on the bottom right is from the Casa Rufi in Pompeii and the silver kylix that sits atop it is design after findings in Hildesheim, Germany.

The spectators represent real people in Alma-Tadema's life. Seated on the bench are Ellen Gosse (wife of Edmund Gosse), Washington Eeps, and Alma-Tadema with his hand outstretched. Standing are Laura, and his two daughters Anna and Laurence.

== Interpretations ==
Art historians have drawn connections between Alma-Tadema's paintings of imperial Rome to the British Empire of the Victorian era, most notable being Louise Lippincot's monograph Spring. Alma-Tadema's artwork can be characterized by his unique attention to painting domestic scenes of antiquity. It was his view that though eras changed, but people did not. He painted the daily lives of the ancients the same way artists portrayed victorians in genre painting. Thus the phrase "Victorians in togas" came to be. It is also important to consider that during the 19th-century the British was an imperial power with colonial holdings all over the globe. To some, Alma-Tadema's paintings acted as a mirror through which the British saw themselves: inheritors of the Roman Empire. His paintings served as proof of the similarities between one of the greatest civilizations of history and the current dominant imperial power. However, art historian Elizabeth Prettejohn argues that this interpretation is too readily taken as a given and neglects the archaeological and historical details she claims are meant to capture the essence of the age.

The Sculpture Gallery is said to be inspired by the gatherings Alma-Tadema hosted at his studio . Despite his success, Alma-Tadema sole focus on depicting ancient subject matter was criticized by his friends who would challenge him to "paint a Roman picture gallery." That painting was A Collector of Pictures at the Time of Augustus (1867) and when Ernest Gambart saw the painting he comissed Alma-Tadema to create another featuring himself among the statues. This inspired many other paintings featuring companions of Alma-Tadema and later these companions were assumed to encourage Alma-Tadema to paint The Sculpture Gallery.

Art Historian Rosemary Barrow interprets the painting as Alma-Tadema pointing out the ignorant connoisseur by portray the Roman collector as more concerned with acquisition of art work rather than with the value of artwork. As mentioned, there are many sculptures in the gallery space but they are Roman copies of greek originals. The only Greek original in the gallery is the 4th century BC column drum from the Temple of Artemis and it is ignored by the spectators for the bronze sculpture of Scylla in the center.
