= Alma-Tadema =

Alma-Tadema is a surname. Notable people with the surname include:

- Lawrence Alma-Tadema (1836–1912), Dutch painter
- Laura Theresa Alma-Tadema (1852–1909), English painter and second wife of Sir Lawrence
- Laurence Alma-Tadema (1865–1940), novelist and poet; Sir Lawrence's first daughter
- Anna Alma-Tadema (1867–1943), painter; Sir Lawrence's second daughter

== See also ==
- Steinway Alma Tadema, a special version of the Steinway D-274 concert piano, designed by Sir Lawrence
