= William Birmingham Costello =

Irish surgeon

- Born: William Birmingham Costello; 1800; Dublin, Ireland
- Died: 15 August 1867 (aged 66–67)
- Occupations: Surgeon and Medical Author
- Years active: 1829–1867
- Notable work: Edited the Cyclopædia of Practical Surgery, including a copious bibliography

William Birmingham Costello (1800–1867) was an Irish surgeon, alienist and medical author.

== Life ==
Costello was born near Dublin, and was educated there. He then spent the 1820s in Paris, a student of surgery under Jean Civiale, Guillaume Dupuytren and Charles Louis Stanislas Heurteloup.

In 1829 Costello set up himself in London as a surgeon, specialising in the stone and lithotrity. He wrote journal articles, and lectured in the transient Brewer Street medical school, with John Epps and Michael Ryan. Subsequently, he became medical superintendent of Wyke House Asylum, near Isleworth.

In later life Costello lived in Paris, working mostly as a writer. He died there on 15 August 1867.

== Works ==
Costello edited the Cyclopædia of Practical Surgery, including a copious bibliography; of which 12 parts were published in London, 1841–3. Contributors included Walter Hayle Walshe, and John Gay who wrote on "cleft palate". In his Paris years, Costello was able to complete the work in four volumes (1861), using his own English translations of articles by French surgeons.

Costello wrote also An Address to the Visiting Justices of the Hanwell Lunatic Asylum (1839), and A Letter to Lord Ashley on the Reform of Private Lunatic Asylums (1845).

== Notes ==
Attribution

This article incorporates text from a publication now in the public domain: Stephen, Leslie, ed. (1887). "Costello, William Birmingham". Dictionary of National Biography. Vol. 12. London: Smith, Elder & Co.
