= Laura Theresa Alma-Tadema =

English painter

Laura Theresa, Lady Alma-Tadema
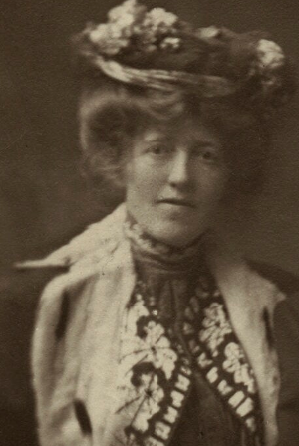
- Portrait by Lena Carroll
- Born: Laura Theresa Epps; 16 April 1852; London, England
- Died: 15 August 1909 (aged 57); Hindhead, Surrey, England
- Known for: Genre painting
- Spouse: Sir Lawrence Alma-Tadema (m. 1871)
- Awards: Gold medal, Internationale Kunstausstellung, Berlin, 1876; Silver medal, World's Columbian Exposition, Chicago, 1893; Silver medal, Paris International Exhibition, 1900

Laura Theresa, Lady Alma-Tadema (née Epps; 16 April 1852 – 15 August 1909) was a British painter specialising in domestic and genre scenes of women and children. Eighteen of her paintings were exhibited at the Royal Academy. Her husband, Sir Lawrence Alma-Tadema, was one of the most prominent Victorian painters.

== Life ==
A daughter of Dr. George Napoleon Epps (who was brother of Dr. John Epps), she had two sisters who were also painters (Emily studied under John Brett, a Pre-Raphaelite, and Ellen under Ford Madox Brown), while Edmund Gosse and a stockbroker, Rowland Hill, were her brothers-in-law.

It was at Madox Brown's home that Alma-Tadema first met her in December 1869, when she was aged 17 and he was 33. (His first wife had died in May that year.) He fell in love at first sight, and so it was partly her presence in London (and partly the fact that only in England had his work consistently sold) that influenced him into relocating to England rather than elsewhere when forced to leave the continent by the outbreak of the Franco-Prussian War in July 1870.

Arriving in London at the beginning of September 1870 with his small daughters and sister Artje, Alma-Tadema wasted no time in contacting Epps, and it was arranged that he would give her painting lessons. During one of these, he proposed marriage. As he was then thirty-four and Laura was now only eighteen, her father was initially opposed to the idea. Dr. Epps finally agreed on the condition that they should wait until they knew each other better. They married in July 1871 and, though this second marriage was childless, it also proved enduring and happy, with Laura acting as stepmother to her husband's daughters by his first marriage, Laurence and Anna.

The Paris Salon in 1873 gave Alma-Tadema her first success in painting, and in 1878, at the Paris International Exhibition, she was one of only two English women artists exhibited. Her other venues included the Royal Academy (from 1873), the Grosvenor Gallery and others in London. Alma-Tadema exhibited her work at the Palace of Fine Arts at the 1893 World's Columbian Exposition in Chicago, Illinois. She also had occasional work as an illustrator, particularly for The English Illustrated Magazine, and was well known as a hostess in their London residences at Regents Park and later Grove End Road. Alma-Tadema died on 15 August 1909; a letter to the Times newspaper printed two days later detailed the circumstances leading to her death:

Lady Alma-Tadema spent the months of June and July in a German cure, from which she returned a few days ago in a very weak state. She was advised to leave town immediately, and she entered an establishment in Hindhead. Here her malady suddenly took a critical turn on Friday last and she passed away painlessly after an unconsciousness of many hours on the night of Sunday.

A memorial exhibition of her work was held at the Fine Art Society the following year.

== Style ==
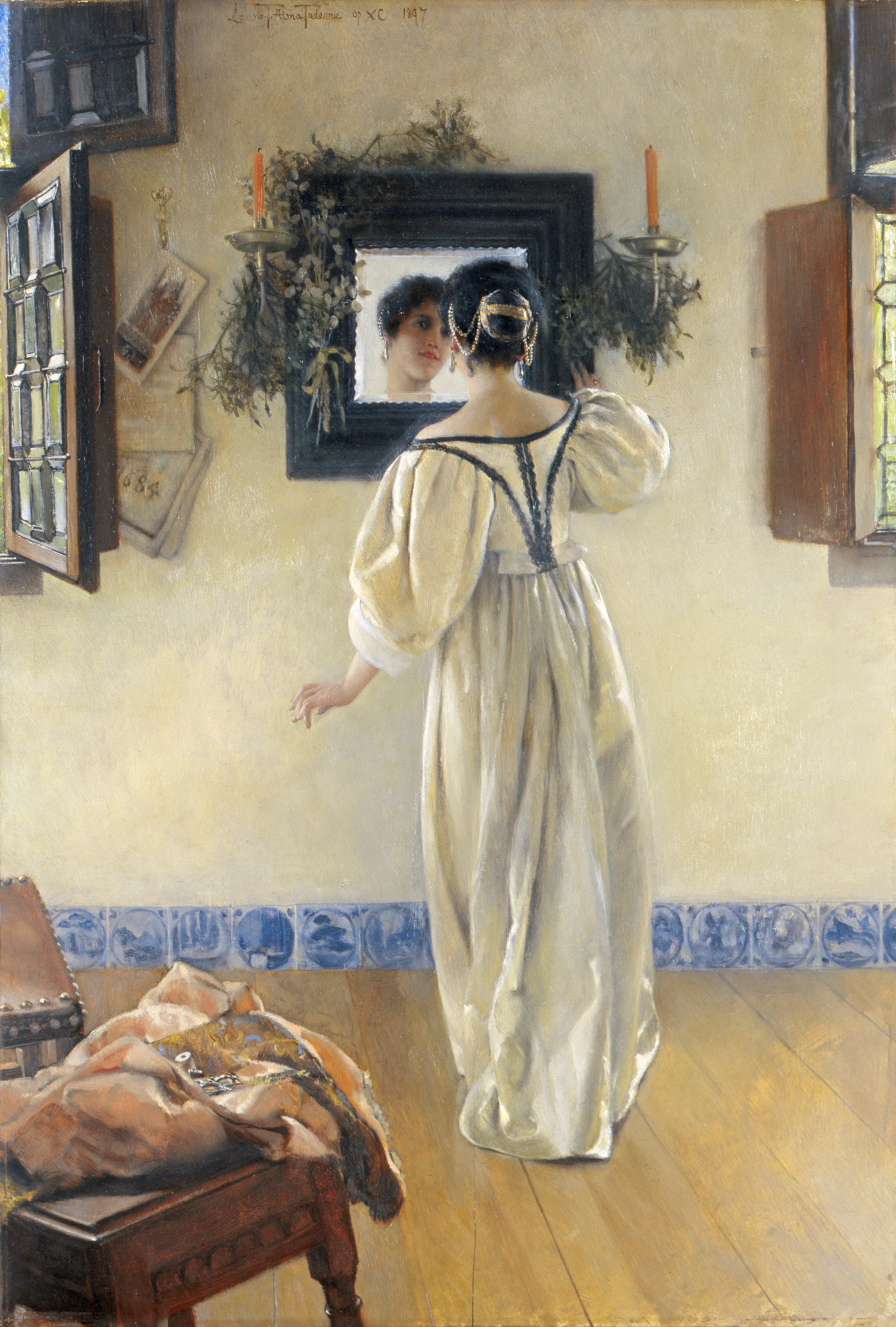
A Knock at the Door, Currier Museum of Art, 1897

Alma-Tadema specialised in highly sentimental domestic and genre scenes of women and children, often in Dutch 17th-century settings and style, like Love's Beginning, Hush-a-bye, The Carol, At the Doorway (c.1898, shown right) and Sunshine. She painted some classical subjects and landscapes akin to those of her husband, but in general her main influence was 17th-century Dutch art, which was a far less restrained influence in her work than his. She studied the works of Vermeer and de Hooch on visits to the Low Countries. Alma-Tadema, like her husband, numbered her work chronologically by giving them Opus numbers.

== Depictions ==
As well as frequently being painted by her husband after their marriage (The Women of Amphissa of 1887 being a notable example), she is also shown in a seated statuette by Amendola in 1879, a bust by Jules Dalou in 1876, and a portrait by Jules Bastien-Lepage.

== Works ==
- Always Welcome, showing a child at her mother's sick-bed (held at the Russell-Cotes Art Gallery & Museum)
- Ruin (and children), an Italianate scene (also held at the Russell-Cotes)
- Hawking - Medieval (held at the Bury Art Museum)
- Mamma's chair (1873; Alma-Tadema's "Opus V")
- Sweet Industry (1904), showing women weaving (held at Manchester Art Gallery)
- George Eliot (pencil portrait, 1877; held at the National Portrait Gallery)
- A Knock at the Door (1897; held at the Currier Museum of Art in Manchester, New Hampshire)
- Young Girl Dressing (c.1889; held at the National Gallery of Art, Washington, DC)

== Exhibited at the Royal Academy ==
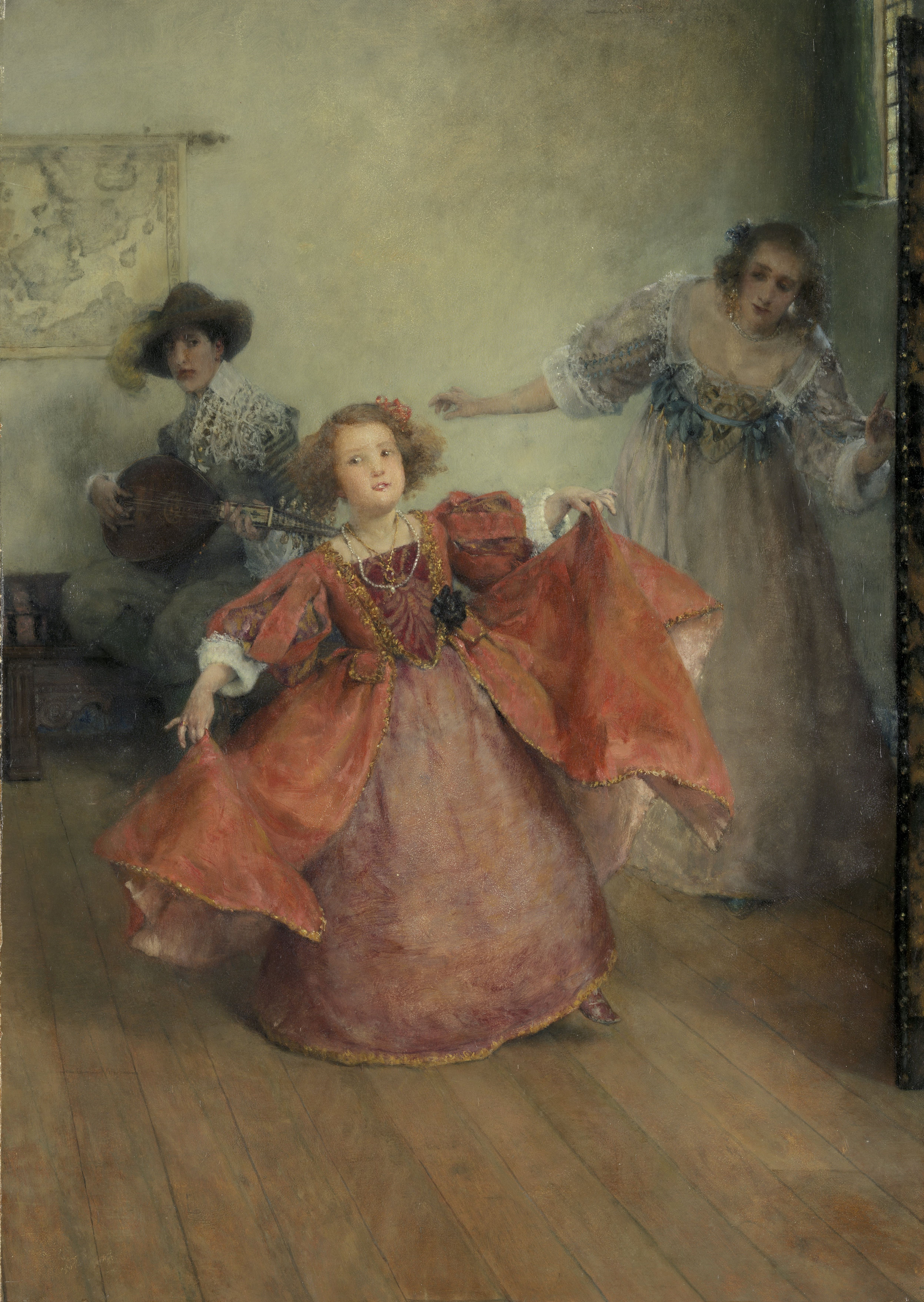
"Airs and Graces" is in the Rijksmuseum

- Mamma's Chair (1873)
- A Bird-cage (1875)
- A Blue Stocking (1877)
- A Good Book (1880)
- Amber and Opal (1880)
- Winter (1881)
- Asleep (1882)
- Saying Grace (1884)
- Self Help (1885)
- Nothing venture, nothing have (1888)
- The Pet Goldfish (1890)
- Hush-a-bye (1892)
- Satisfaction Persuasion (1893)
- The Pain of Parting (1895)
- A Carol (1896)
- Emblemata (1906)
- Peacemaking (1907)
- Sigh no more, Ladies (1909)
