= Love's Victory (disambiguation) =

Love's Victory is a Jacobean era pastoral drama (c. 1620) by English Renaissance writer Lady Mary Wroth.

Love's Victory may also refer to:

- Love's Victory, a 1658 poem by William Chamberlayne
- Love's Victory (play), an 1825 play by George Hyde
- Love's Victory, an 1890 poem by John Arthur Blaikie
