= Répétition du "Joueur de flûte" et de "La femme de Diomède" chez le prince Napoléon =

Painting by Gustave Boulanger

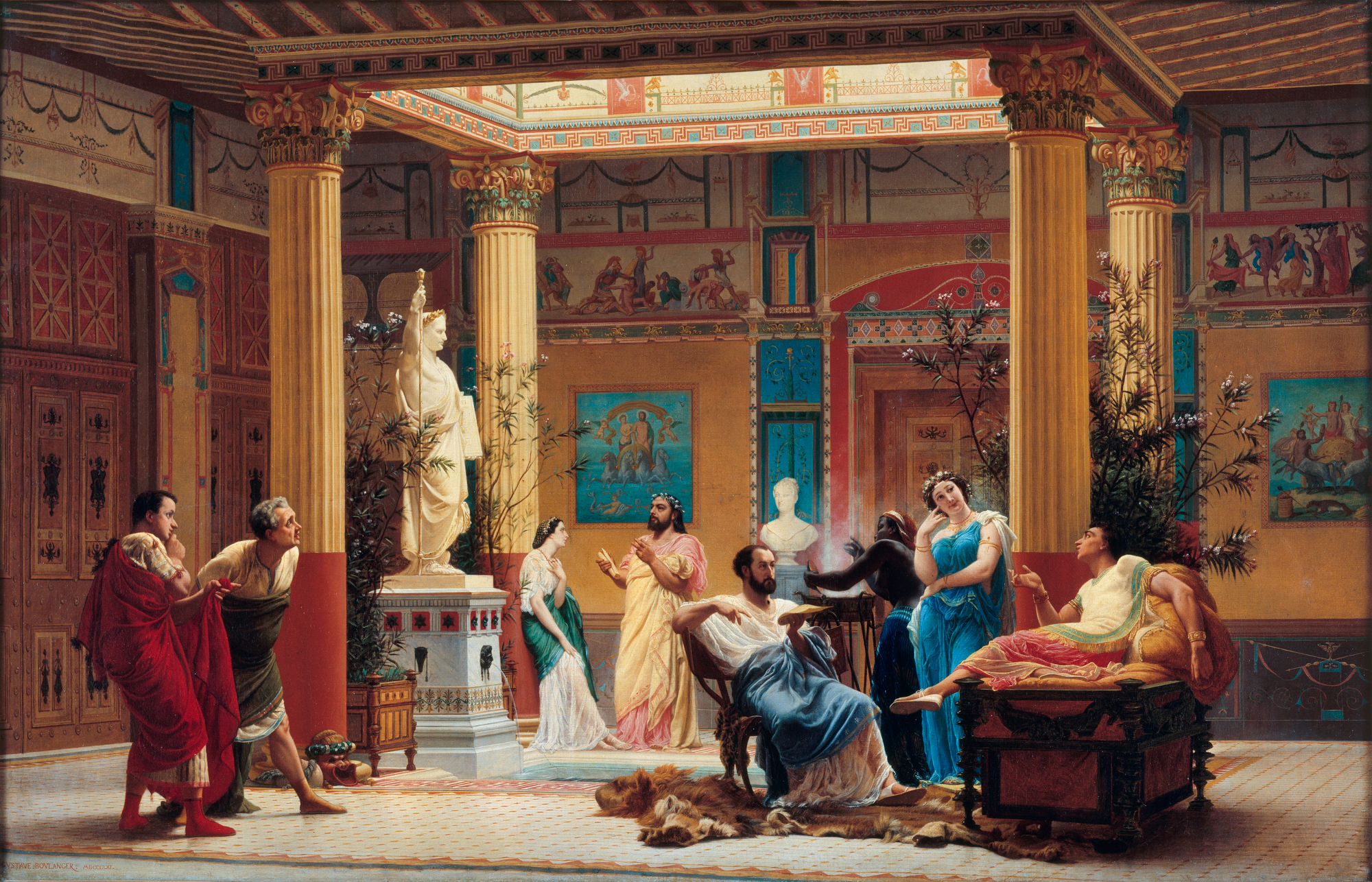
- Artist: Gustave Boulanger
- Year: 1861
- Medium: Oil on canvas
- Dimensions: 83 cm × 130 cm (33 in × 51 in)
- Location: Musée d’Orsay; Paris

Répétition du "Joueur de flûte" et de "La femme de Diomède" chez le prince Napoléon (Rehearsal of "The Flute Player" and "Wife of Diomedes" at the Place of Prince Napoléon) is a painting by French artist Gustave Boulanger. The painting's full title as given in the catalogue for the Paris Salon of 1861 is Répétition du "Joueur de flûte" et de "la Femme de Diomède," chez S.A.I. le prince Napoléon, dans l’atrium de sa maison, avenue Montaigne.

In 1855, Prince Napoléon, cousin of Napoleon III, decided to build a palace inspired by the villas of Pompeii, a place to keep his paintings, to throw parties, and to please his mistress, the actress Rachel, an iconic performer of ancient tragedies. The building, inspired in particular by the Villa of Diomedes at Pompeii, had rooms around an atrium open to the sky with a shallow pool below. Busts of the Bonaparte family surrounded the atrium, with a white marble statue of Napoleon I presiding in the guise of a deified Caesar. The Néo-Grec painter Jean-Léon Gérôme took part in the project by making three paintings that he considered "perhaps the most beautiful things he ever signed."

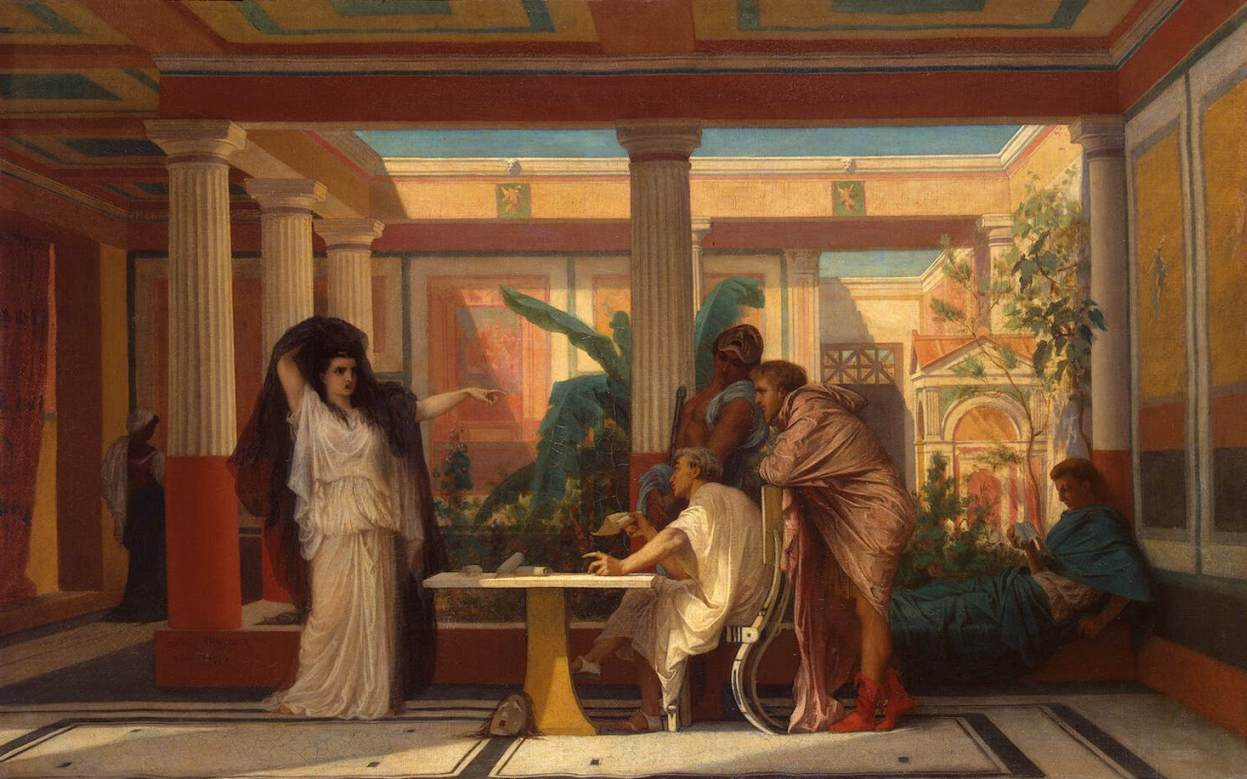
Gustave Boulanger, Répétition théâtrale dans la maison d’un poète romain, 1855, Hermitage Museum.

The Pompeiian palace was inaugurated on 14 February 1860, in the presence of the Emperor and Empress, with all the guests and performers in ancient costume. Théophile Gautier was present to hear the recitation of his poem written for the occasion, La Femme de Diomède: Prologue. Then famous actors of the Théâtre-Français and the Comedie-Française performed The Flute Player, a play by Emile Augier, a friend of Gautier and the Néo-Grecs.

Boulanger's Répétition théâtrale dans la maison d’un poète romain at the Salon of 1855 played a part in inspiring both the Pompeiian palace and its inauguration with a play. Boulanger was privileged to immortalize the occasion with a work presented at the Salon of 1861, Répétition du "Joueur de flûte" et de la "Femme de Diomède" chez le prince Napoléon, which depicted not the performance itself but a rehearsal, with only writers, actors, and a Black slave present.

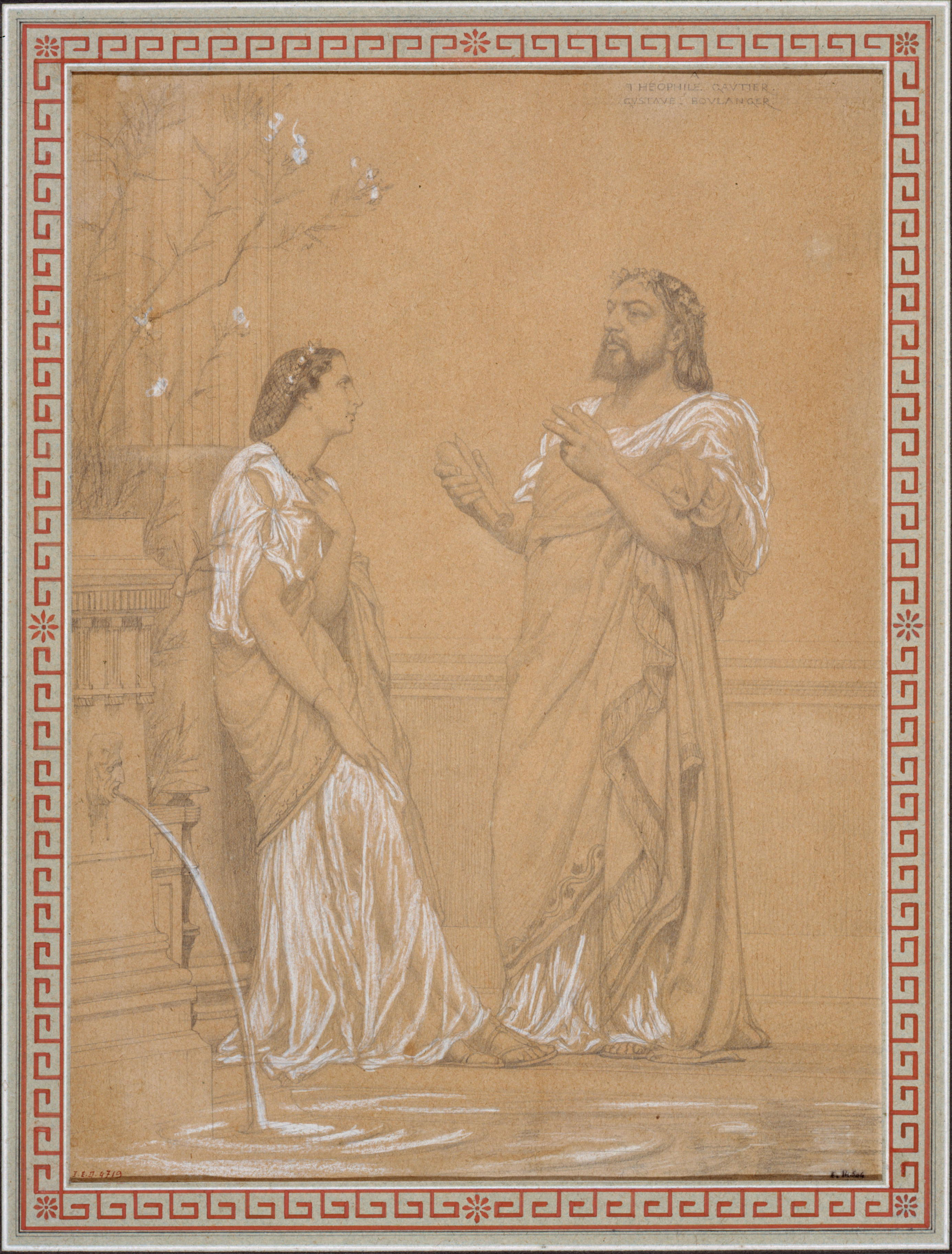
Gustave Boulanger, study of Marie Favart and Théophile Gautier in Roman costumes, 1861, Musée Carnavalet.

Gautier wrote that the painting "will preserve the memory of a charming spectacle…here are [the actors] Madeleine Brohan, Marie Favart, and Got, and Samson, and Jean-Marie Geoffroy. All are ancients and moderns at the same time…M. Boulanger was able to merge, with rare spirit and a perfect fit, two apparently irreconcilable elements: the present and past, Paris and Pompeii before the eruption of Vesuvius!…rarely has an ancient pastiche been more successful."

Art historian Hélène Jagot remarks that the painting is many things at once—a pastiche (of numerous other pastiches, including history painting, historical re-enactment, and everything to do with the Pompeiian palace itself), a successful phantasmagoria, and a parody of Greek Revival art and its sources (Madeleine Brohan for example recalls the pose of the Ingres' Stratonice.)

Saskia Hanselaar notes that

despite its title and the action highlighted by Boulanger, the real stars of this work are neither the authors nor the celebrity actors, but the architecture itself. It is precisely about living the fantasy of a rediscovered Antiquity, and not of representing it through painting. This work has the force of evocation, and therefore of memory. It not only evokes Antiquity recreated [by the architects and Gérome]…but also a fantasy of time travel, and an homage to an era considered ideal, pure and primitive. Gautier himself expresses it this way: "Modern life has come to awaken ancient life."

A hundred years after it was first shown, Anita Brookner assessed the painting this way:

There was, for me, a great reward in seeing precisely the kind of picture against which, we are always told, Manet reacted, although we rarely have an idea of what it looked like. This was La Répétition du "Joueur de Flûte" dans la maison romaine du prince Napoleon, dated 1861, by Gustave Boulanger, the French Alma-Tadema, and within its limits, not half bad. I particularly liked the attention meted out to the tiger-skin rug on the marble floor, the reproduction of the pink, blue, and yellow Percier and Fontaine décor, and the painstaking red key-pattern painted dizzily around the cornice. It is about time we stopped being frightened of the so-called bad pictures of the nineteenth century (they are, after all, no worse than the so-called good ones of today) and allowed ourselves to expend a little honest affection on them.

The Pompeiian palace was demolished in 1891. A few photographs and Boulanger's painting are the only vestiges of its transient splendor. With its synthesis of art, architecture, theatricality, re-enactment, wry humor, and royal patronage, Boulanger's Répétition du "Joueur de flûte" may be seen as the apotheosis of the Néo-Grec aesthetic.

== Sources ==
- Brookner, Anita (1962). "Current and Forthcoming Exhibitions: Paris", The Burlington Magazine, vol. 104, no. 713, August, 1962, pp. 361–364.
- Explication des ouvrages des peinture…des artistes vivants (catalogue of the Paris Salon), Paris: Dubray, 1861; entry for Gustave Boulanger, p.46.
- Gautier, Théophile (1861). "Boulanger (Gustave)" in Abécédaire du Salon de 1861, Paris: 1861, p. 67-71.
- Gautier, T., Houssaye, A., nd Coligny, C. (1866). Le palais pompéien de l'avenue Montaigne: études sur la maison grécoromaine, ancienne résidence duprince Napoléon, Paris, 1866.
- Hanselaar, Saskia (2016). "La maison pompéienne de Joseph Napoléon par Gustave Boulanger", Histoire par l'image, posted May 2016.
- Jagot, Hélène (2013). La Peinture Nó-Grecque (1847-1874); Réflexions sur la constitution d’une catégorie stylistique, Theses pour obtenir le grade de Docteur (en Histoire de l'art) de l'Université de Paris-Ouest Nanterre La Défense.
- Safran, Linda (1980). "A Note on Boulanger’s Répétition Générale du Joueur de Flûte," Gazette des Beaux-Arts, 6, no. 96, November 1980, pp. 185–6.
