= Desmond Henry Ryan =

Irish drama and music critic

(Michael) Desmond Henry Ryan (3 March 1816 – 8 December 1868) was an Irish drama and music critic, known also as a librettist and lyricist.

== Life ==
The son of Michael Ryan, he was born at Kilkenny and educated at Edinburgh for the medical profession, but went to London in 1836 and gradually drifted into literature.

In 1844 Ryan became a contributor to the Musical World, of which he was sub-editor from 1846 to 1868. He was also connected as musical and dramatic critic with The Morning Post, Morning Chronicle, Morning Herald, and other journals.

Ryan died in London.

== Works ==
Christopher among the Mountains, a satire on Christopher North's criticism of the last canto of Childe Harold, and a parody of the Noctes Ambrosianæ, were early efforts.

In 1849 Ryan wrote the libretto of George Alexander Macfarren's Charles II; and a spectacular opera, Pietro il Grande, commissioned by Louis Jullien, was produced at the Royal Italian Opera on 17 August 1852.

In collaboration with Francis Mori, Ryan wrote the opera Lambert Simnel, intended for Sims Reeves, but never produced. He wrote the words of a large number of songs, including Songs of Even, with music by Frederick Nicholls Crouch (1841), a set of twelve Sacred Songs and Ballads by Edward Loder (1845), and a collection of Songs of Ireland, in which, with Crouch, he fitted old melodies with new words.

== Notes ==
Attribution

This article incorporates text from a publication now in the public domain: Lee, Sidney, ed. (1897). "Ryan, Michael Desmond". Dictionary of National Biography. Vol. 50. London: Smith, Elder & Co.
