= Ellen Gosse =

British artist (1850–1929)

Lady Ellen Gosse
- Born: March 23, 1850; London, United Kingdom
- Died: August 29, 1929 (aged 79); London, United Kingdom
- Spouse: Edmund Gosse
- Children: Emily Teresa Gosse, Philip Henry George, Sylvia Gosse
- Parents: George Napoleon Epps (father); Charlotte Bacon (mother)
- Relatives: Laura Theresa Alma-Tadema, Emily Williams, Amy Epps, John Gosse, John Epps

Lady Ellen 'Nellie' Gosse (née Epps; 23 March 1850 – 29 August 1929) was a British landscape painter. Her work was exhibited across Great Britain and Europe, including at the Royal Academy, Royal Scottish Academy, and Paris Salon. Part of an artistic family, her sisters Laura Theresa Alma-Tadema, Emily Williams, Amy Epps, and her daughter Sylvia Gosse were also all painters. Her husband Sir Edmund Gosse was an English poet, author and critic.

== Biography ==
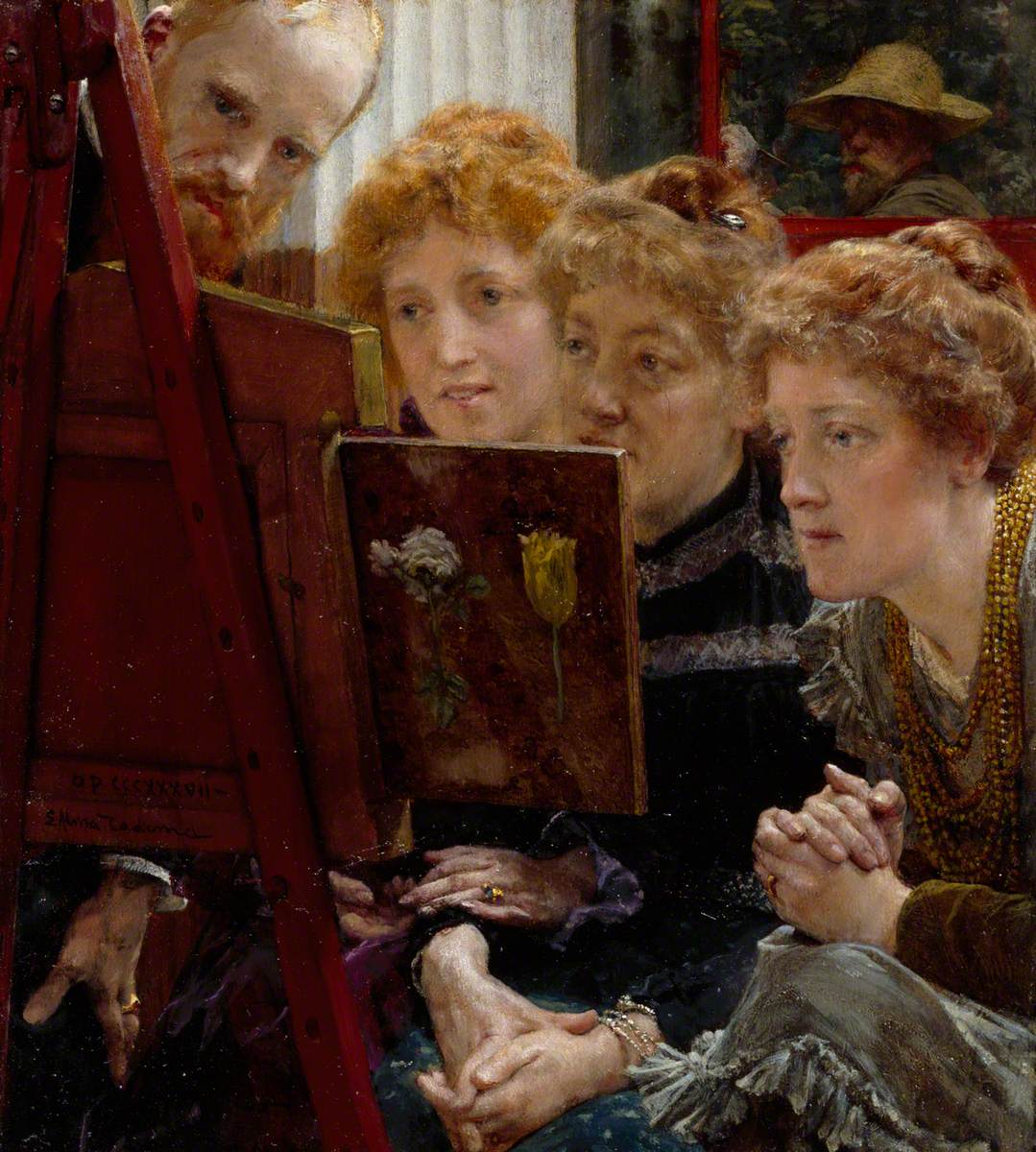
Ellen Gosse (middle left) with siblings Washington Epps (left), Emily Williams (middle right) & Laura Alma-Tadema (right). Lawrence Alma-Tadema: A Family Group, 1896, oil on panel, 30.5 × 27.9 centimetres.

Gosse was born in Mayfair, London on March 23, 1850, the youngest of six children of homeopath and author George Napoleon Epps and Charlotte Bacon. She received further education at Queen's College on Harley Street, but had ambitions of being a painter.

Ellen was staunchly against marriage and wished to remain independent, determined to pursue her art and earn money for herself. In October 1874 after observing her for a while, Edmund Gosse proposed to her spontaneously at a party – Ellen refused. Edmund repeatedly pursued her and visited her every week until December when she accepted, but only on the condition that the marriage would not impact her career as a painter – he had to promise she "could paint everyday". [sic?] They married eight months later in August 1875.

Ellen and Edmund were married for over 53 years and had three children: Emily "Tessa" Teresa (1877–1951), physician and author Philip Henry George (1879–1959), and painter Laura Sylvia (1881–1968). The family lived in Paddington and later in 1901 moved Regent's Park, hosting such guests as Henry James, Thomas Hardy, Robert Louis Stevenson and Rudyard Kipling. In the late 1920s she moved to a nursing home, after her husband experienced health problems. Ellen died in London on 29 August 1929, Aged 79.

== Career ==
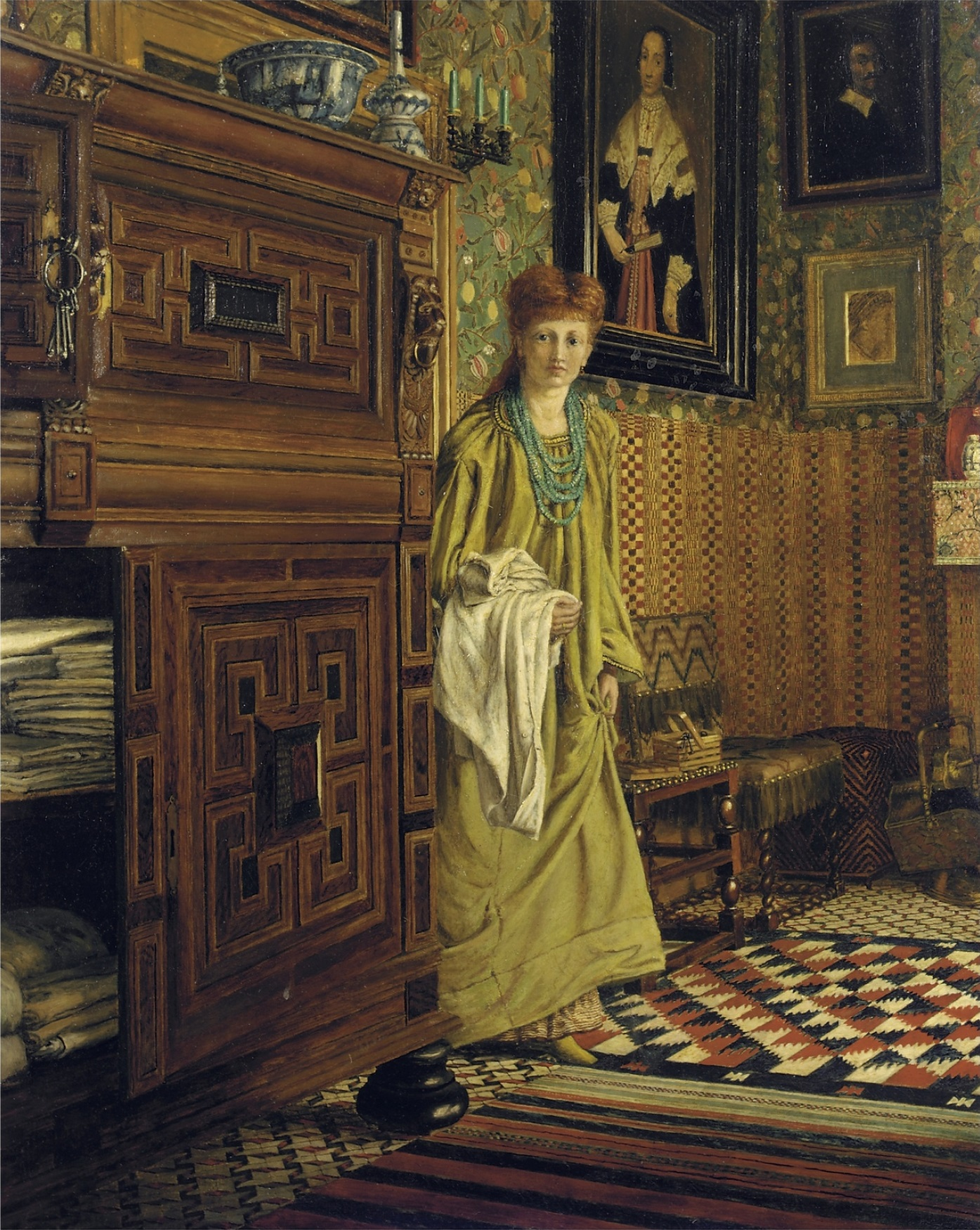
Ellen Gosse: Portrait of Laura Alma-Tadema, 1873, oil on canvas, 77,5 × 63 centimetres

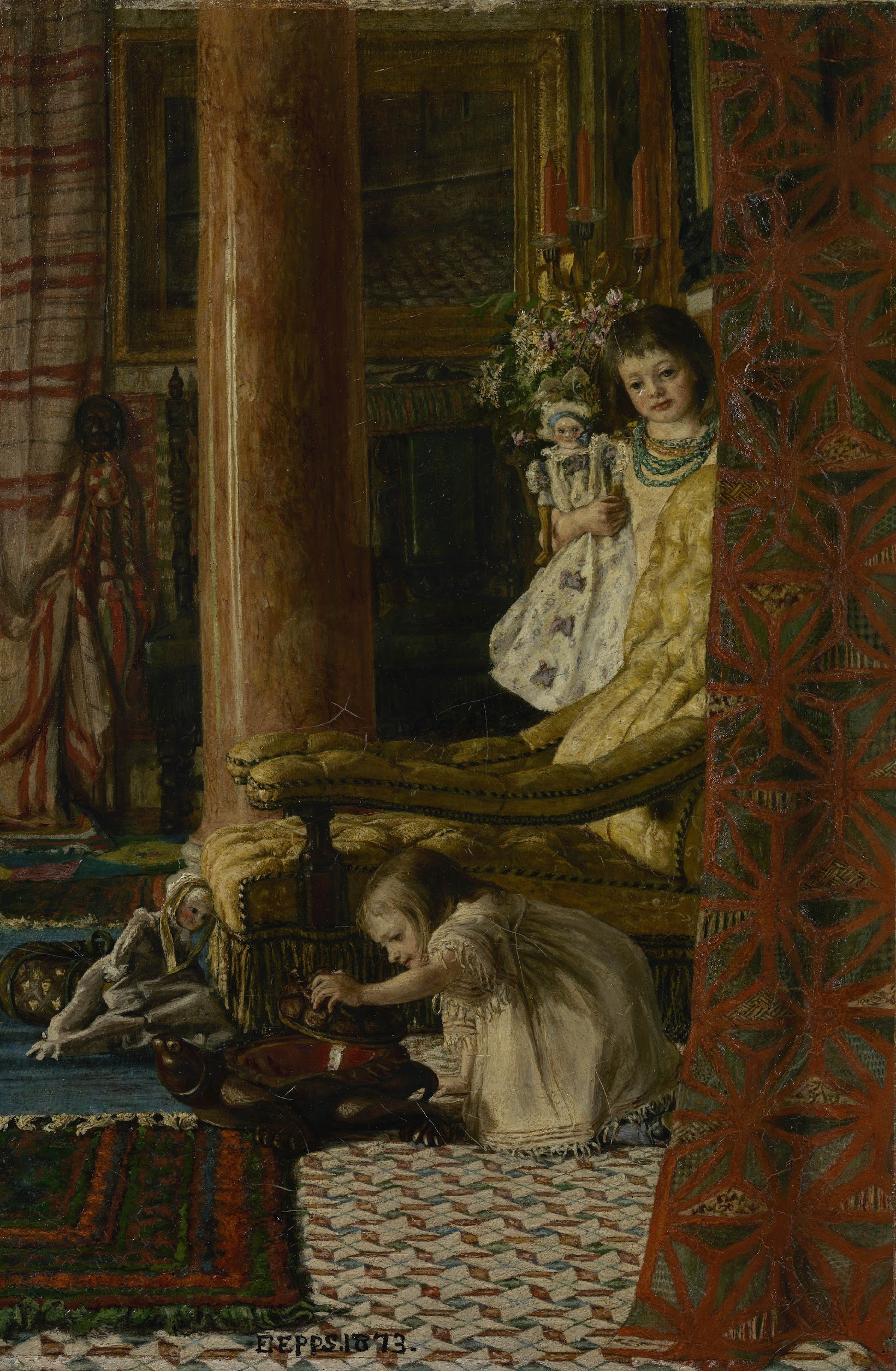
Ellen Gosse: Hall in Townshend House, 1873, oil on canvas, 46.3 x 30.5 centimetres

Having shown promise from a young age, in 1860s and early 1870s Gosse studied under Ford Madox Brown, Cave Thomas, and Sir Lawrence Alma-Tadema (her future brother-in-law), as well as at the British Museum. As a result, she became acquainted in the Pre-Raphaelite circle.

In 1873 she travelled across Europe painting and visiting galleries in France and Italy, mainly creating landscapes. On her return in 1874 she opened her own studio on Devonshire Street and was exhibiting regularly, including at Paris Salon (Le Jardin, 1874), Royal Society of British Artists (Marley Hollow, Haslemere in 1875/6 and Embleton Burn, Northumberland in 1882/3), Royal Glasgow Institute of the Fine Arts (five works 1875–77), and the Royal Scottish Academy (1876). Her work was praised – Robert Browning commended her "two jewel-like pictures" exhibited at the Grosvenor Gallery and her future husband Edmund Gosse wrote that she had "no small reputation as a painter, for a young girl, that is to say".

Despite her husband Edmund's previous promises and his sympathies to her wishes, Ellen's aspirations as an artist suffered in their marriage. She continued with her painting but exhibited less after 1890, although notably at the Dudley Gallery and the Gallery of the Society of French Artists. She instead begin writing more than painting, publishing children's stories, art reviews, travel pieces, and verse. Her painting was mainly confined to her travels, such as to Cornwall and Norway.

Although she mainly painted landscapes, Gosse's best known works today are portraits: Portrait of Laura Alma-Tadema (1873) depicting her sister Laura, and Hall in Townshend House (1873) of her step-nieces Laurense and Anna Alma-Tadema, which is still in the Mesdag Collection.

== Works ==
- Hall in Townshend House (1873)
- Portrait of Laura Alma-Tadema (1873)
- Marley Hollow, Haslemere (1875/76)
- Embleton Burn, Northumberland (1882/83)
- Deep in a Novel (1876)
- A Sussex Landscape (1877)
