= Walter Hayle Walshe =

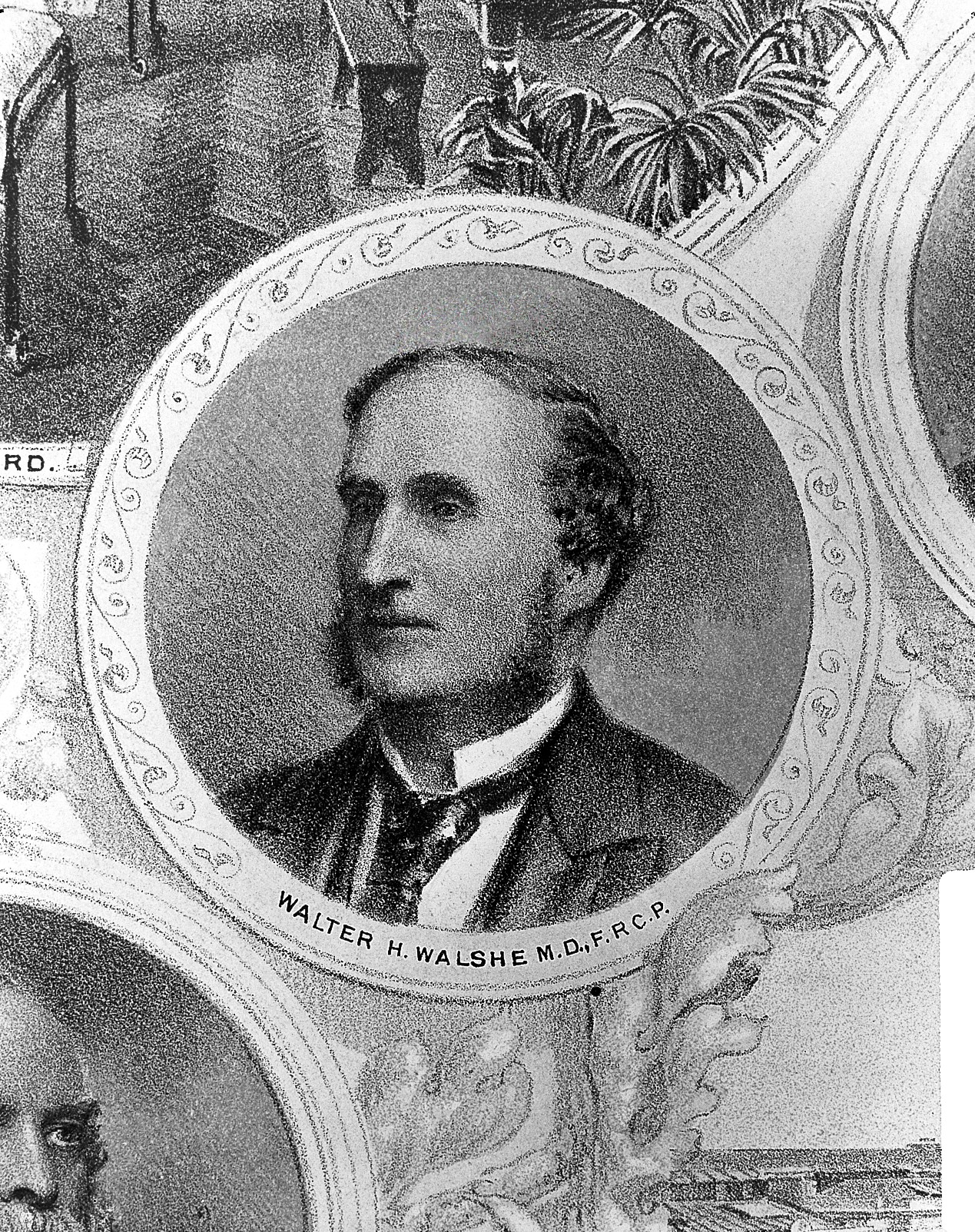
Portrait of Walter Hayle Walshe

Walter Hayle Walshe (1812–1892) was an Irish physician, a pioneer in the study of cancer with his discovery that malignant cells can be recognised under a microscope.

== Life ==
The son of William Walshe, a barrister, he was born in Dublin on 19 March 1812. He studied at Trinity College, Dublin, entering in 1827, but did not take a degree. In 1830 he went to live in Paris, and there initially studied oriental languages, but in 1832 began medicine. He became acquainted in 1834 with the anatomist Pierre Charles Alexandre Louis. Oliver Wendell Holmes Sr. and François Louis Isidore Valleix, the French physician, were his fellow-students, and continued his friends throughout life.

Walshe went to Edinburgh in 1835, there graduated M.D. in 1836, and in 1838 began practice in London. He was elected as professor of morbid anatomy at University College, London, in 1841, lecturing on morbid anatomy till 1846, when he was elected Holme professor of clinical medicine and physician to University College Hospital. In 1848 he was appointed professor of the principles and practice of medicine, a post which he held till 1862. In his lectures he used numerical statements of fact and case analysis; Sir William Jenner praised his clarity. His pupils maintained that he was the first accurately to describe the anatomy of movable kidney and epidural haematoma, and to teach that patients with aortic regurgitation are likely to die suddenly.

In 1852 Walshe was elected a fellow of the College of Physicians of London. He first lived in Upper Charlotte Street, then in Queen Anne Street, and had for at time a considerable practice as a physician. Sir Andrew Clark commented that he had little ability in the treatment of disease.

Walshe died in London on 14 December 1892. In 1868 he married Caroline Ellen Baker, and had one son.

== Works ==
In 1843 Walshe published The Physical Diagnosis of Diseases of the Lungs, later superseded by the Auscultation and Percussion of Samuel Gee, one of his pupils. He translated P. C. A. Louis's Recherches sur la Phthisie into English in 1844. In 1846 he published a large volume On the Nature and Treatment of Cancer, a collection of the then existing knowledge of neoplasms and hypotheses as to their origin. In 1851 he published A Practical Treatise on Diseases of the Lungs and Heart, of which several editions appeared, and part of which was enlarged into A Practical Treatise on the Diseases of the Heart and Great Vessels. A complete list of his medical books is to be found in vol. xvi. of the Index Catalogue of the Library of the Surgeon-general's Office, U. S. Army.

Walshe wrote in 1839 and 1840 numerous pathological articles in William Birmingham Costello's Cyclopædia of Practical Surgery. He made contributions to medical journals and transactions, and in 1885 wrote the Colloquial Linguistic Faculty and its Physiological Groundwork, of which a second edition appeared in 1886. He published in 1881 a short treatise called Dramatic Singing Physiologically Estimated, in which he attempted to provide numerically scaled quantifications and categorical qualifications of the operatic or traditional classical voice, based on the qualities of a singer's voice itself, how it used in vocalization, and the dramatic expression employed by the singer and in relation to the two other categories.

== Notes ==
Attribution

This article incorporates text from a publication now in the public domain: "Walshe, Walter Hayle". Dictionary of National Biography. London: Smith, Elder & Co. 1885–1900.
