= Sylvia Gosse =

English painter

Laura Sylvia Gosse
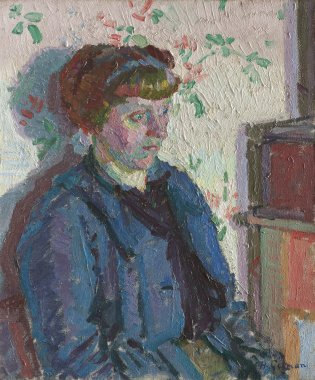
- Sylvia Gosse by Harold Gilman, oil on canvas, ca. 1913
- Born: 14 February 1881; London, United Kingdom
- Died: 6 June 1968 (aged 87); London, United Kingdom
- Known for: Painting

Laura Sylvia Gosse (14 February 1881 – 6 June 1968) was an English painter and printmaker. She also ran an art school with the painter Walter Sickert.

== Education and teaching ==
Laura Sylvia Gosse, known as Sylvia, was the youngest of three children of artist Ellen (Epps) Gosse and English poet and critic Sir Edmund Gosse. Her grandfather was the naturalist Philip Henry Gosse, and the painter Lawrence Alma-Tadema was her uncle by marriage. Gosse got her art training first at the St. John's Wood Art School and then at the Royal Academy of Art (1906–09).

In 1908, the artist Walter Sickert was impressed by her talent and decided she should learn etching. She enrolled in Sickert's evening classes, first at the Westminster School of Art and then at a private art school he founded in the Hampstead Road. Gosse eventually took over responsibility for running this school, which became known as Rowlandson House (alternatively, the Sickert and Gosse School of Painting and Etching). She served as co-principal from 1910 until it closed in 1914 and taught some classes there as well. Gosse had an independent income, and without her financial support the school would have closed much sooner.

The Printer, c. 1915, Sylvia Gosse oil on canvas (100 x 74.8 cm) Swindon Art Gallery (AG1978/318)

Gosse remained close to Sickert and his wife Christine, whom she nursed through her final illness in 1920. Afterwards, she managed Sickert's household and served at times as his studio assistant. In the 1930s, she was one of the organizers of the Sickert Fund, which was raised to enable Sickert to be financially independent.

== Art career ==
Gosse first exhibited her work in 1911 at the New English Art Club, and a portrait of her father was shown in the 1912 Royal Academy Summer Exhibition. In 1913, she had her first solo show, at the Carfax Gallery, and she was elected to the London Group around the same time. She was also a member of the Royal Society of British Artists. She continued exhibiting for several more decades. Eye cataracts put an end to her painting in 1961, and she died in 1968.

Sickert's influence shows both in Gosse's brushy style and in her subject matter, which leans towards domestic interiors, street scenes, and London night life. She often worked from photographs, and one of her better-known paintings is Madrid Crowd, painted from a published news photograph of a Madrid crowd in 1931.

Her work is held by numerous British museums, including the Tate, the British Government Art Collection, the National Portrait Gallery, the Ashmolean Museum, the Ingram Collection of Modern British Art, and many others.
