= George Napoleon Epps =

19th century English homeopathic doctor

George Napoleon Epps (22 July 1815 – 28 May 1874) was an English homœopathic practitioner and author.

== Life ==
Epps was the half-brother of physician and homeopath John Epps, and was born on 22 July 1815. He was educated at Mill Hill School in London After being for some years his brother's pupil and assistant, he became a member of the London College of Surgeons in 1845, and was in the same year appointed surgeon to the Homœopathic Hospital in Hanover Square. He was successful in treating spinal curvatures and deformities.

Epps had a large practice to which he was devoted, never sleeping out of his house for twenty years. In 1833 he married Charlotte Bacon. He died on 28 May 1874.

== Works ==
In 1849 Epps published Spinal Curvature, its Theory and Cure. He added a third part to Joseph Hippolyt Pulte's Homœopathic Physician, brought out by his brother in 1852, on the Treatment of Accidents; and published revised editions of Walter Williamson's Diseases of Infants and Children, and Diseases of Women and their Homœopathic Treatment, in 1857. In 1859 he published a work, On Deformities of the Spine and on Club Foot.

== Family ==
Epps married in 1833 Charlotte Bacon. Their daughter Ellen (1850–1929) married Edmund Gosse, and their daughter Laura Theresa (1852–1909) married Lawrence Alma-Tadema.
