= London Medical and Surgical Journal =

- Discipline: Medicine, Surgery
- Peer-reviewed: No
- Language: English
- Edited by: John Davies, John Epps, Joseph Houlton (Founding)

Publication details
- History: Established 1828; Ceased publication 1836
- Frequency: Monthly
- Open access: No

Standard abbreviations
- ISO 4: Lond. Med. Surg. J.

The London Medical and Surgical Journal was a British medical journal first published as a monthly in 1828. The founding editors-in-chief were John Davies, John Epps, and Joseph Houlton. The editorial line was in favour of medical reform. It also wrote from the perspective of independent medical teachers and general practitioners in London, and represented the Dissenter interest. In the same market as The Lancet, it was less scurrilous and at 6d. competed on price.

The journal closed down shortly after its editor, Michael Ryan, became insolvent in 1836.
