= John Gay (surgeon) =

English surgeon

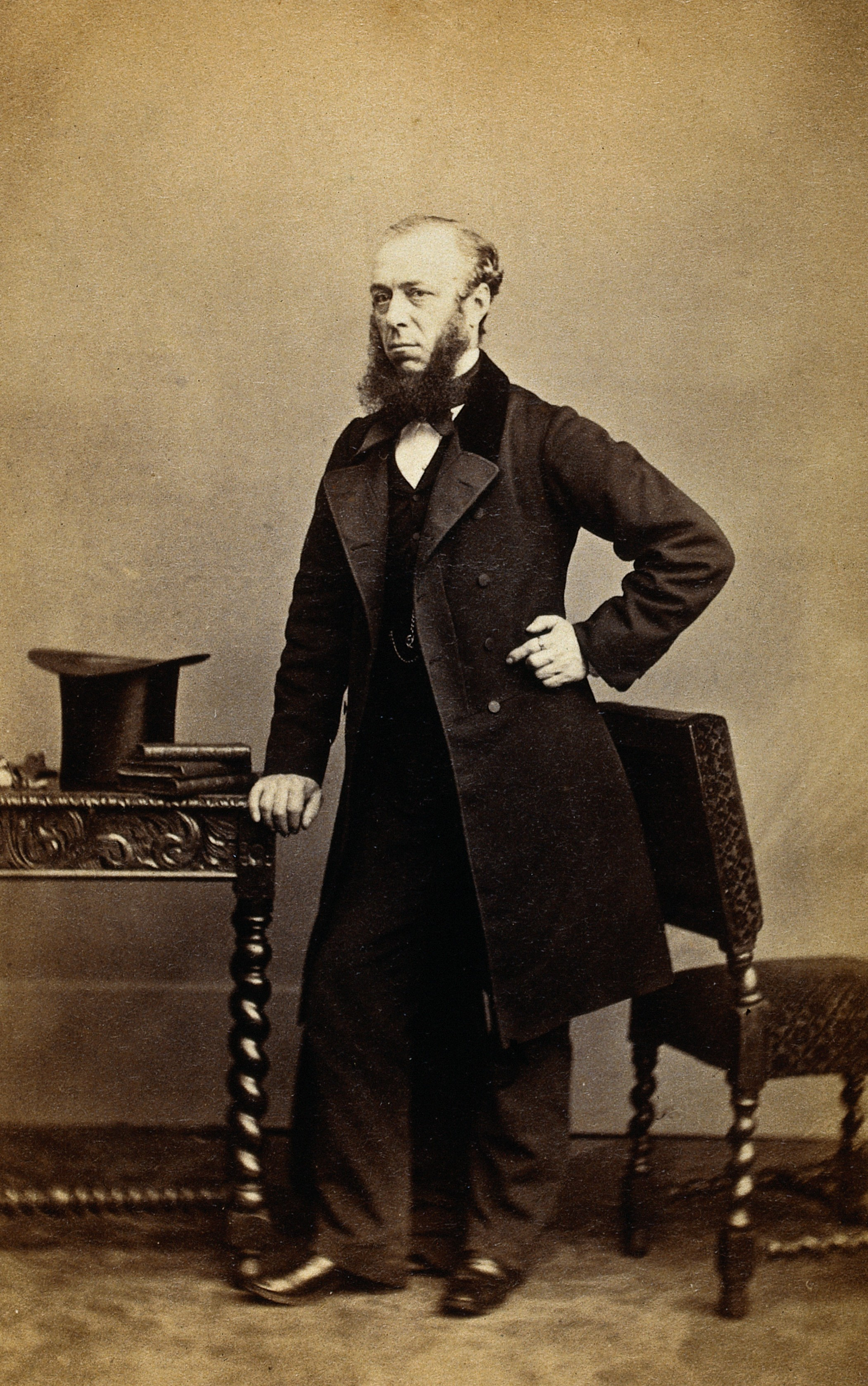
Picture of John Gay

John Gay (1813 – 15 September 1885) was an English surgeon.

== Life ==
Gay was born at Wellington, Somerset. After a successful studentship at St. Bartholomew's Hospital, London, he became a member of the Royal College of Surgeons in 1834, and in 1836 was appointed surgeon to the newly established Royal Free Hospital, with which he was connected for 18 years. In 1856, he became surgeon of the Great Northern Hospital, of which he was senior surgeon at the time of his death in 1885, after two years' partial paralysis. He left a widow, one daughter, and two sons.

== Works ==
Gay wrote some substantive practical memoirs:

- On Femoral Rupture, its Anatomy, Pathology, and Surgery, 1848.
- On Indolent Ulcers and their Surgical Treatment, 1855.
- On Varicose Disease of the Lower Extremities and its Allied Disorders, 1868; the Lettsomian lectures before the Medical Society of London, for 1867.
- On Hæmorrhoidal Disorder, 1882.

The 1848 work on femoral rupture described a new mode of operating, modified from that of John Luke. He also advocated and successfully practised the free incision of acutely suppurating joints, which came into general use. He contributed many papers to the medical journals and transactions of societies, wrote for the medical press, and was author of a detailed article on "Cleft Palate" in William Birmingham Costello's Cyclopædia of Surgery.

== Notes ==
Attribution

This article incorporates text from a publication now in the public domain: Stephen, Leslie, ed. (1890). "Gay, John (1813-1885)". Dictionary of National Biography. Vol. 21. London: Smith, Elder & Co.
