= James Fernandez Clarke =

English surgeon and medical writer

James Fernandez Clarke (1812–1876) was an English surgeon and medical writer.

== Life ==
Clarke was born at Olney, Buckinghamshire; his father and grandfather were prosperous lace merchants. After one or two brief apprenticeships, in 1828 he was placed under C. Snitch, a general practitioner, in Brydges Street, Covent Garden. Here he managed to get the run of Thomas Cadell the younger's library in the Strand, and became acquainted with literature and literary people.

In October 1833 Clarke entered at Dermott's Medical School in Gerrard Street, Soho, as a medical student. For a time he acted as Dermott's amanuensis, and afterwards aided Michael Ryan in the London Medical and Surgical Journal. In 1834 Robert Liston noticed a report by Clarke of one of his cases, and introduced him to Thomas Wakley, editor of The Lancet; who took on Clarke. He became a clinical reporter at hospitals, and also was for many years reported on medical societies, ducking most of the rows which The Lancet provoked.

For 30 years Clarke was on the Lancet, and at the same time carried on a medical practice in Gerrard Street; he became a licentiate of the Society of Apothecaries in 1837, and a member of the Royal College of Surgeons in 1852. He died on 6 July 1875.

== Works ==
On ceasing to write for The Lancet, published his reminiscences in the Medical Times and Gazette. These were brought out in 1874 as Autobiographical Recollections of the Medical Profession, covering medical men, with anecdotes of literary and public characters.

== Notes ==
Attribution

This article incorporates text from a publication now in the public domain: Stephen, Leslie, ed. (1887). "Clarke, James Fernandez". Dictionary of National Biography. Vol. 10. London: Smith, Elder & Co.
