= Edmund Gosse =

English poet, author and critic (1849–1928)

Sir Edmund Gosse CB
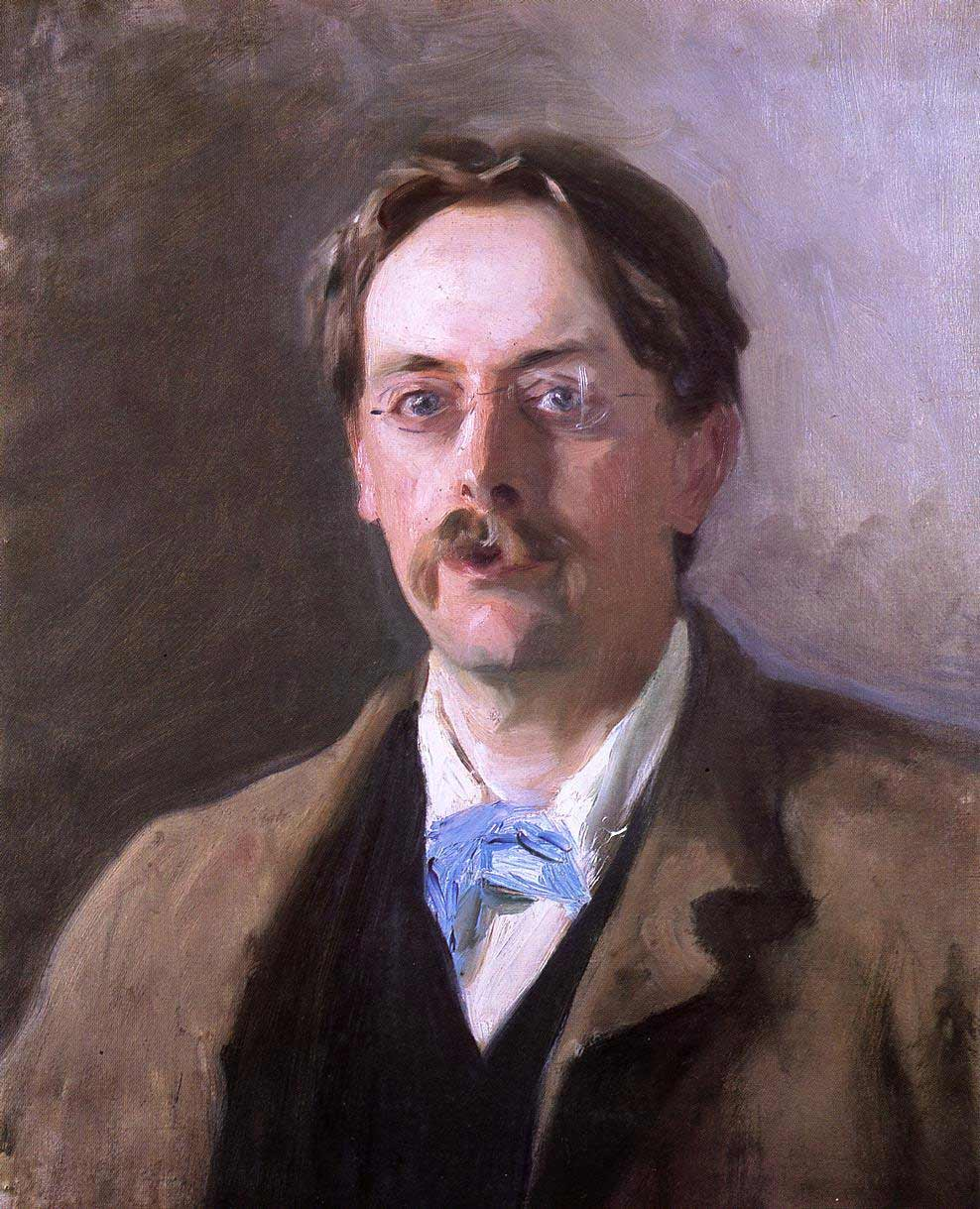
- Portrait by John Singer Sargent, 1886
- Born: 21 September 1849 London, England
- Died: 16 May 1928 (aged 78) London, England
- Occupation: Poet; author; critic
- Notable works: Father and Son (1907)
- Spouse: Ellen Gosse
- Children: 3, including Sylvia
- Parents: Philip Henry Gosse; Emily Bowes

Signature
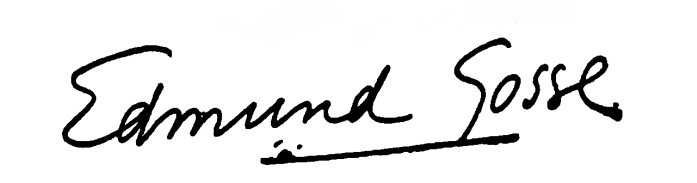

Sir Edmund William Gosse (/ɡɒs/; 21 September 1849 – 16 May 1928) was an English poet, author and critic. He was strictly brought up in a small Protestant sect, the Plymouth Brethren, but broke away sharply from that faith. His account of his childhood in the book Father and Son has been described as the first psychological biography.

His friendship with the sculptor Hamo Thornycroft inspired a successful career as a historian of late-Victorian sculpture. His translations of Henrik Ibsen helped to promote that playwright in England, and he encouraged the careers of Sarojini Naidu, Toru Dutt, W. B. Yeats and James Joyce. He also lectured in English literature at Cambridge University.

== Early life ==
Gosse was the son of Philip Henry Gosse and Emily Bowes. His father was a naturalist and one of the chief figures among Brethren, his mother was a published poet, author, and leading religious tract writer. Both were deeply committed to a small Protestant sect, known by the misnomer Plymouth Brethren. His childhood was initially happy as they spent their summers in Devon, where his father was developing the ideas that gave rise to the craze for the marine aquarium. After his mother died of breast cancer when he was eight, and they moved to Devon, his life with his father became increasingly strained by his father's expectations that he should follow in his religious tradition. Gosse was sent to a boarding school, where he began to develop his interests in literature. In 1860, his father remarried the deeply religious Quaker spinster Eliza Brightwen (1813–1900), whose brother Thomas tried to encourage Edmund to become a banker. He later gave an account of his childhood in the book Father and Son, which has been described as the first psychological biography. At the age of 18 and working in the British Museum in London, he broke away from his father's influence in a dramatic coming of age. Nearly a century after Gosse's death, a study based on his published remarks and writings about his father concluded that, in varying degrees, they are "riddled with error, distortion, contradictions, unwarranted claims, misrepresentation, abuse of the written record, and unfamiliarity with the subject".

Eliza Gosse's brother George Brightwen was the husband of Eliza Brightwen, née Elder (1830–1906), a naturalist and author, whose first book was published in 1890. After Eliza Brightwen's death, Edmund Gosse arranged for the publication of her two posthumous works, Last Hours with Nature (1908) and Eliza Brightwen, the Life and Thoughts of a Naturalist (1909), both edited by W. H. Chesson, and the latter book with an introduction and epilogue by Gosse.

Gosse was the second cousin of Annie Morgan, also of strict Plymouth Brethren upbringing, who married physician Alexander Waugh (1840–1906) and was mother of Arthur Waugh and grandmother to the writers Alec Waugh and Evelyn Waugh.

== Career ==
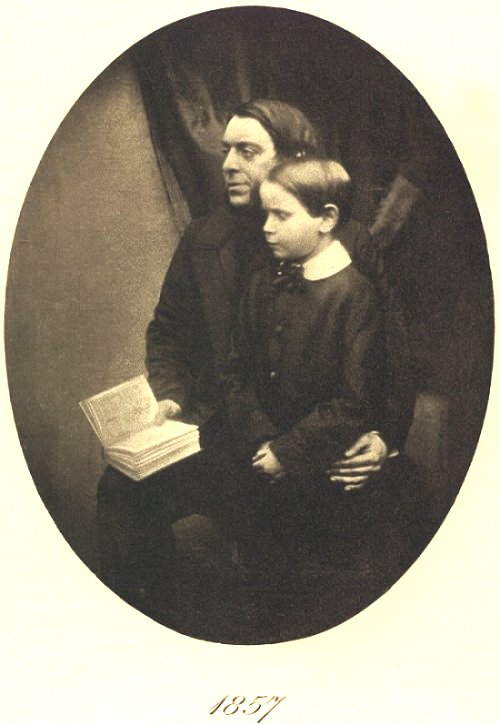
Edmund Gosse in 1857, with father Philip Henry Gosse

Gosse started his career as assistant librarian at the British Museum from 1867, alongside the songwriter Theo Marzials, a post which Charles Kingsley helped his father obtain for him. An early book of poetry published with a friend John Arthur Blaikie gave him an introduction to the Pre-Raphaelite Brotherhood. Trips to Denmark and Norway in 1872 to 1874, where he visited Hans Christian Andersen and Frederik Paludan-Müller, led to publishing success with reviews of Henrik Ibsen and Bjørnstjerne Bjørnson in the Cornhill Magazine. He was soon reviewing Scandinavian literature in a variety of publications. He became acquainted with Alfred, Lord Tennyson and friends with Robert Browning, Algernon Charles Swinburne, Thomas Hardy and Henry James.

In the meantime, he published his first solo volume of poetry, On Viol and Flute (1873) and a work of criticism, Studies in the Literature of Northern Europe (1879). Gosse and Robert Louis Stevenson first met while teenagers, and after 1879, when Stevenson came to London on occasion, he would stay with Gosse and his family. In 1875, Gosse became a translator at the Board of Trade, a post which he held until 1904 and gave him time for his writing and enabled him to marry and start a family.

From 1884 to 1890, Gosse lectured in English literature at Trinity College, Cambridge, despite his lack of academic qualifications. Cambridge University gave him an honorary MA in 1886, and Trinity College formally admitted him as a member 'by order of the Council' in 1889. He made a successful American lecture tour in 1884 and was much in demand as a speaker and on committees as well as publishing a string of critical works as well as poetry and histories.

He became in the 1880s one of the most important art critics dealing with sculpture (writing mainly for the Saturday Review) with an interest spurred on by his intimate friendship with the sculptor Hamo Thornycroft. Gosse would eventually write the first history of the renaissance of late-Victorian sculpture in 1894 in a four-part series for The Art Journal, dubbing the movement the New Sculpture. In 1902 he published an English translation of Alexandre Dumas fils' Lady of the Camellias.

In 1904, he became the librarian of the House of Lords Library, where he exercised considerable influence till he retired in 1914. He wrote for the Sunday Times and was an expert on Thomas Gray, William Congreve, John Donne, Jeremy Taylor, and Coventry Patmore. He can also take credit for introducing Ibsen's work to the British public. Gosse and William Archer collaborated in translating Hedda Gabler and The Master Builder; those two translations were performed throughout the 20th century. Gosse and Archer, along with George Bernard Shaw, were perhaps the literary critics most responsible for popularising Ibsen's plays among English-speaking audiences. Gosse was instrumental in getting official financial support for two struggling Irish writers, W.B. Yeats in 1910 and James Joyce in 1915. This enabled both writers to continue their chosen careers.

His most famous book is the autobiographical Father and Son about his troubled relationship with his Plymouth Brethren father, Philip, which was dramatised for television by Dennis Potter. Published anonymously in 1907, it followed a biography that he had written of his father as a naturalist after which he was urged by George Moore among others to write more about his past. Historians caution, though, that notwithstanding its psychological insight and literary excellence, Gosse's narrative is often at odds with the verifiable facts of his own and his parents' lives. In later life, he became a formative influence on Siegfried Sassoon, the nephew of his lifelong friend, Hamo Thornycroft. Sassoon's mother was a friend of Gosse's wife, Ellen. Gosse was also closely tied to figures such as Algernon Charles Swinburne, John Addington Symonds, and André Gide.

His book The Autumn Garden, which was published in 1908 by the London publisher William Heinemann, includes over 50 individual poems and essays.

Gosse was the literary editor for the 1911 edition of the Encyclopædia Britannica. From 1898, he edited the Short Histories of the Literatures of the World book series (Heinemann, London) which was co-published in the United States by D. Appleton and Company, New York.

== Personal life ==
Gosse married Ellen Epps (23 March 1850 – 29 August 1929), a young painter in the Pre-Raphaelite circle, who was the daughter of George Napoleon Epps. Though she was initially determined to pursue her art, she succumbed to his determined courting, and they married in August 1875 with a reception at the house of Lawrence Alma-Tadema (her brother-in-law) and visiting Gosse's father and step-mother (who did not attend the register office wedding) at the end of their honeymoon in Devon and Cornwall. She continued to paint and wrote stories and reviews for various publications. In 1907, she inherited a sizeable fortune from her uncle, James Epps (the brother of John Epps and who had made his fortune in cocoa).

They were married more than 53 years and had three children: Emily Teresa ("Tessa") (1877–1951), Philip Henry George (1879–1959) who became a physician (he was also the naturalist on the FitzGerald expedition which made the first ascent of Aconcagua and the author of The Pirates' Who's Who (1924)) and Laura Sylvia (1881–1968), who became a well-known painter.

Despite a reportedly happy marriage, Gosse had consistent, if deeply closeted, homosexual desires. Although initially reluctant to acknowledge those desires, he in 1890 acknowledged to John Addington Symonds, around the time that the latter was working on A Problem in Modern Ethics, that Gosse indeed was attracted to men, which confirmed suspicions that Symonds had voiced. "Either way, I entirely deeply sympathize with you. Years ago I wanted to write to you about all this", Gosse wrote to Symonds, "and withdrew through cowardice. I have had a very fortunate life, but there has been this obstinate twist in it! I have reached a quieter time—some beginnings of that Sophoclean period when the wild beast dies. He is not dead, but tamer; I understand him & the trick of his claws".

== Honours ==
Gosse was named a Companion of the Order of the Bath (CB) in 1912. He was knighted in 1925.

== In popular culture ==
- His book Father and Son partially inspired Oscar and Lucinda, a novel by Peter Carey, which won the 1988 Booker Prize and the 1989 Miles Franklin Award.
- Father and Son was also the basis for Dennis Potter's television play Where Adam Stood.
- Julian Barnes has an academic called Ed Winterton devoted to writing a biography of Gosse in his 1984 novel Flaubert's Parrot.

== Works ==
=== Published verse ===
- Madrigals, Songs, and Sonnets (1870), co-author John Arthur Blaikie
- On Viol and Flute (1873)
- King Erik (1876)
- New Poems (1879)
- Firdausi in Exile (1885)
- In Russet and Silver (1894)
- Collected Poems (1896)
- Hypolympia, or the Gods on the Island (1901), an "ironic phantasy", the scene of which is laid in the 20th century, though the personages are Greek gods, is written in prose, with some blank verse.
- The Autumn Garden (1908)

=== Critical works ===
- English Odes (1881)
- Seventeenth Century Studies (1883)
- Life of Thomas Gray, whose works he edited (4 vols., 1884)
- Life of William Congreve (1888)
- A History of Eighteenth Century Literature (1889)
- Gossip in a Library (essays about books, 1892)
- Questions at issue (1893)
- The Jacobean Poets (1894)
- Critical Kit-kats (1896)
- A Short History of Modern English Literature (1897)
- Life and Letters of Dr John Donne, Dean of St Paul's (1899)
- Illustrated Record of English Literature, with Richard Garnett (vols. iii and iv, 1903–1904)
- Jeremy Taylor (1903, "English Men of Letters")
- Life of Sir Thomas Browne (1905)
- French Profiles (1905)
- Portraits and Studies (1912)
- Collected Essays (1912)
- Three French Moralists (1918)
- Malherbe and the Classical Reaction in the Seventeenth Century (1920)
- More Books on the Table (1923)

=== Biography ===
- Gray (1882)
- The Life of Philip Henry Gosse, F.R.S. (1890) online text
- Father and Son (1907)
- The Life of Algernon Charles Swinburne (1917) online text

=== Other ===
- The Secret of Narcisse. A Romance (1892)
- Two Visits to Denmark, 1872, 1874 (1911)
- Inter Arma (1916)
- Some Diversions of a Man of Letters (1919)

Government offices
| Preceded by Sandford Arthur Strong | House of Lords Librarian; 1904–1914 | Succeeded by Arthur Butler |
