= John Epps =

19th Century English physician

- Dr John Epps
- Born: 15 February 1805; Sevenoaks, Kent, UK
- Died: 12 February 1869 (aged 64)
- Resting place: Kensal Green Cemetery
- Education: Dissenting academy and Mill Hill School; medical apprenticeship; degree at Edinburgh
- Occupation(s): Lecturer and unlicensed medical practitioner
- Known for: Political activist and religious dissident
- Title: Dr

Dr John Epps (15 February 1805 – 12 February 1869) was an English physician, phrenologist and homeopath. He was also a political activist, known as a champion of radical causes on which he preached, lectured and wrote in periodicals.

== Life ==
=== Early years and education ===
Epps, the eldest son of John Epps (see Epps family), was born into a Calvinist family in Sevenoaks, Kent on 15 February 1805. George Napoleon Epps was his half-brother.

Epps became disillusioned with the religious atmosphere of his childhood. After education at a dissenting academy and then Mill Hill School (near Hendon), he served an apprenticeship to an apothecary of the name of Dury or Durie.

In 1824, at the age of 18, Epps went to Edinburgh to study medicine, and in 1827 graduated at the age of 21. He conceived of medicine as 'a tool of liberation for the poor and lower classes'.

=== Medical practitioner and lecturer ===
After graduating Epps moved back to London where he began to practice, eventually settling in Great Russell Street. In 1831 he married. He became Medical Director of the Royal Jennerian and London Vaccine Institution, on the death of John Walker. Epps had a Scottish degree, but no license from the Royal College of Physicians.

Epps also lectured on chemistry, botany, and materia medica, in London locations. Initially this was at the Aldersgate Medical School, and Windmill Street; and later at Westminster at the Hunterian School of Medicine. There was briefly (1830–31) a medical school in Brewer Street, set up by William Birmingham Costello, Epps and Michael Ryan. Epps and Ryan then joined George Darby Dermott in giving lectures at the Western Dispensary in Gerrard Street; James Fernandez Clarke, in his memoirs, described Epps lecturing there as well-read and sympathetic but not deeply versed in practical chemistry, or botany. Epps lectured publicly and extensively for the rest of his life, particularly on phrenology and homoeopathy, in London and elsewhere. When his health failed he continued to lecture in his own home.

=== Phrenologist ===
Introduced to it by his anatomy teacher William Sleigh while still a teenager, Epps embraced the phrenology of Franz Joseph Gall and Johann Spurzheim. While in Edinburgh he became friends with the phrenologists George and Andrew Combe; he had an introduction to Spurzheim through James Simpson. He began to lecture on phrenology in 1827. For Epps, phrenology was integrated with his Baptist Calvinism. With John Elliotson, he supported applications of "phreno-mesmerism".

Epps was influenced not only by continental phrenologists. He took from Gustav Carus and Jean-Baptiste Lamarck. His views were an idiosyncratic mixture from different sources, permitting an optimistic outlook within Calvinist views.

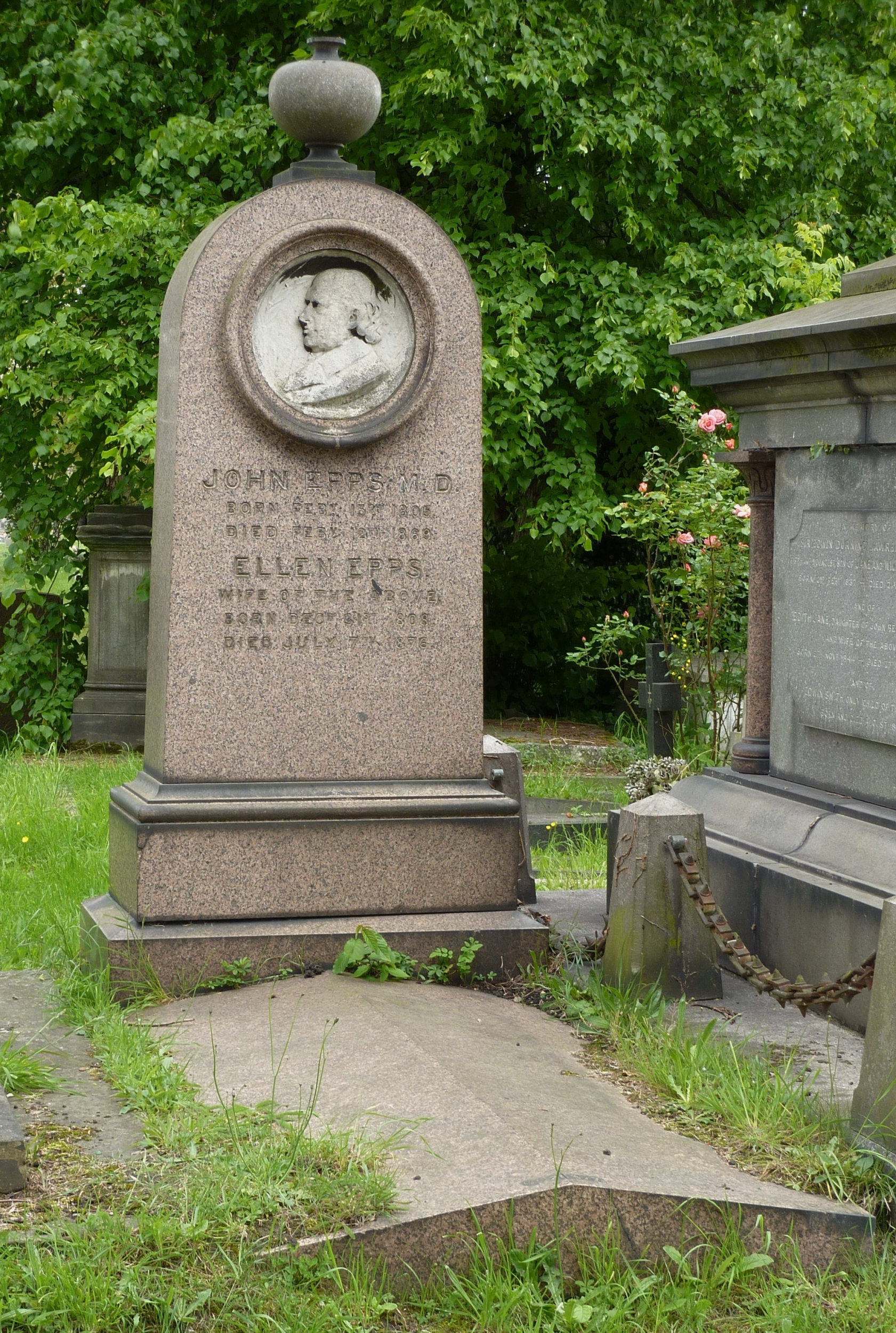
Epps's grave at Kensal Green Cemetery, London, pictured in 2014

In the later 1830s and early 1840s, the Anthropological Society of London (not to be confused with the Anthropological Society of London founded in 1863 by Richard Francis Burton and Dr. James Hunt) was a phrenological group holding meetings, associated with the Christian Physician and Anthropological Magazine edited by Epps. John Isaac Hawkins acted as president. Other members were Luke Burke and William Mattieu Williams. After 1842 it became part of the Christian Phrenological Society.

=== Homeopath ===
Epps was drawn to homoeopathy in about 1837 after reading the works of Dr Paul Francis Curie; his other major influence in homoeopathy was Samuel Hahnemann. He had a "very large homoeopathic practice, especially among the lower middle and lower classes of society". His patients included Charlotte and Emily Brontë.

At odds with Frederic Quin, the earliest British physician who practised homoeopathy, Epps did not join the British Homoeopathic Society. He associated with Curie in the English Homoeopathic Association.

=== Death ===
On 31 January 1869 Epps was attacked by paralysis, and he died, at the age of 64, on 12 February. He is interred at Kensal Green Cemetery, 19 February 1869.

== Radical politics ==
Epps, like his father, became involved in radical politics, as a Liberal and abolitionist. He wrote in his diary "[I have] come to consider all creatures as being equally important in the scale of creation as myself; to regard the poor Indian slave as my brother". He helped organise the National Political Union, and attended the Radical Club. He opposed "Church Rates, war, despots, corn laws, and other old institutions", and enjoyed giving political addresses. His activism brought him into contact with Joseph Hume, Lady Byron, George Wilson (president of the Anti-Corn Law League), Giuseppe Mazzini, Thomas Slingsby Duncombe, James Stansfeld, Lajos Kossuth, and Robert Owen.

Epps was involved in procuring the repeal of the Test Acts (1829) and, along with Francis Place, William Johnson Fox, Francis Burdett and others, with the passing the Reform Bill of 1832. He became a Chartist, and in 1847 he stood for parliament, in Northampton, with Chartist backing.

He was an active member of the Anti-Corn Law League and joined organizations in favor of the Polish, Italian, Hungarian, and American nationalities. He stood bail for the Fourierist and revolutionary Simon François Bernard in 1858 Orsini affair.

=== Medical reform ===
Epps supported "Knowledge Chartism", and opposed medical jargon. He supported the proposal of Thomas Wakley for a London College of Medicine, speaking in support of it at a meeting in 1831, with his colleague George Dermott; he was on the steering committee for its formation, along with Joshua Brookes and David Daniel Davis.

== Religious involvement ==
Epps was brought up in a Calvinist family. From an early age he declared himself an enemy to church establishments and a paid ministry, which can be seen in some of the parliamentary reforms he pushed for. Epps strongly opposed church rates. He denounced the larger Protestant churches as being the "harlot daughters of Rome [i.e. the Roman Catholic Church]".

While in Edinburgh he joined the Scotch Baptists, who had no fixed minister, but those who were moved spoke. In this environment, at the age of 19, Epps became a preacher. However, when he returned to London he left the Scotch Baptists because there the sect was run more like the church systems he rejected. After this, regularly and for many years, he began preaching to mechanics at Dock Head Church. From the early 1830s he moved towards Quaker beliefs.

=== Views ===
Not only did Epps reject the orthodox church establishments, but he also rejected a number of the mainstream Christian doctrines. He rejected the doctrine of the immortal soul, emphasising instead resurrection as the escape from death. In this vein, the second coming of Christ is also emphasised. He taught that Hell is the grave, not the place of torment of mainstream Christianity. He also rejected the Christian Trinity, stating that Jesus, the Son of God, was a human by nature. He also spoke out against the glorification of war-heroes: "the honour of the British flag is a specious phrase which blinds men's eyes to right and wrong", he said.

=== The Devil ===
The most infamous of Epps' unorthodox views regards the devil (1842). He was one of a long line of Dissenters to take this view, stretching back through Simpson (1804), Lardner (1742), Sykes (1737), going back to the Dutch Anabaptist, David Joris (1540). According to Epps, references in the Bible to the devil and Satan are, in the main, to be understood as personifications of the lustful principle in humans. In 1842 he anonymously published The Devil: a Biblical exposition of the truth concerning that old serpent, the devil and Satan and a refutation of the beliefs obtaining in the world regarding sin and its source. The publication brought considerable opposition and, according to historian Alan Eyre,' a lecture given shortly afterward to the Tooting Institution at the Mitre Inn in ... London ... caused serious offence and led to widespread ostracism and hostility'. Similarly, a few years earlier he had delivered a series of lectures at the Dock Head Church to demonstrate that the devil is not a personal being and "this bold assertion drew upon him a world of abuse, and some patients declined to be treated by one holding such heterodox views".

John Epps's faith stayed with him throughout his life; it is recorded that "with his last breath he expressed his humble, yet confident faith in the power, wisdom, and goodness of the Great Father of all spirits".

== Bibliography ==
Epps wrote a number of books, starting before he attended university with A New Way of Teaching English Grammar. In London he published An Introduction to Botany, intended as a textbook for his students, and two books on phrenology called Evidences of Christianity Deduced from Phrenology (1827, as "Medicus") and Horae Phrenologicae.

His work The Organon of the Healing Art, and his first essay on homoeopathy, appeared in 1838. Epps was a frequent contributor to The Lancet until he adopted homoeopathy. In 1843 The Lancet refused to publish reports of homoeopathic treatment; he took rejected articles and published them in a pamphlet entitled Rejected Cases, which also contained a vigorous letter to the editor of the Lancet, his friend Wakley).

Epps was also involved in a number of other journals: he was for some time co-editor of the London Medical and Surgical Journal, and for a long period conducted the Christian Physician and Anthropological Magazine (1836-9), and The Journal of Health and Disease. He established a journal, Notes of a New Truth, for the propagation to nonprofessionals of the "new school" of homoeopathy, to which he contributed up to the time of his death.

As with Notes of a New Truth, the majority of Epps' lectures were directed at lay readers; however, he also lectured to medical professionals and was lecturer on materia medica at the Homoeopathic Hospital, Hanover Square (c. 1861).

- A New Way of Teaching English Grammar
- An Introduction to Botany
- Evidences of Christianity Deduced from Phrenology
- Horae Phrenologicae
- The Life of John Walker, M.D. (1831; available online). This was a biography of his predecessor at the London Vaccine Institute, written for the benefit of Walker's widow.
- What is Homoeopathy?
- Homoeopathy and its Principles Explained (1841; available online)
- The Devil: a Biblical exposition of the truth concerning that old serpent, the devil and Satan and a refutation of the beliefs obtaining in the world regarding sin and its source (1842; available online)
- Notes of a New Truth (journal; editor)
- Rejected Cases
- Homeopathic Domestic Physician (1852-5)
- Domestic homoeopathy, or Rules for the domestic treatment of the maladies of infants, children, and adults
- Constipation its Theory & Cure (1854)
