= John Arthur Blaikie =

English poet and journalist

John Arthur Blaikie (1849 – 25 December 1917) was an English poet and journalist, born in Poplar, Middlesex, and died in Kensington.

== Works ==
- Madrigals, Songs, and Sonnets (1870), co-author Edmund Gosse
- Love's Victory (1890)
- A Sextet of Singers (1895)
