= Laurence Alma-Tadema =

English writer (1865–1940)

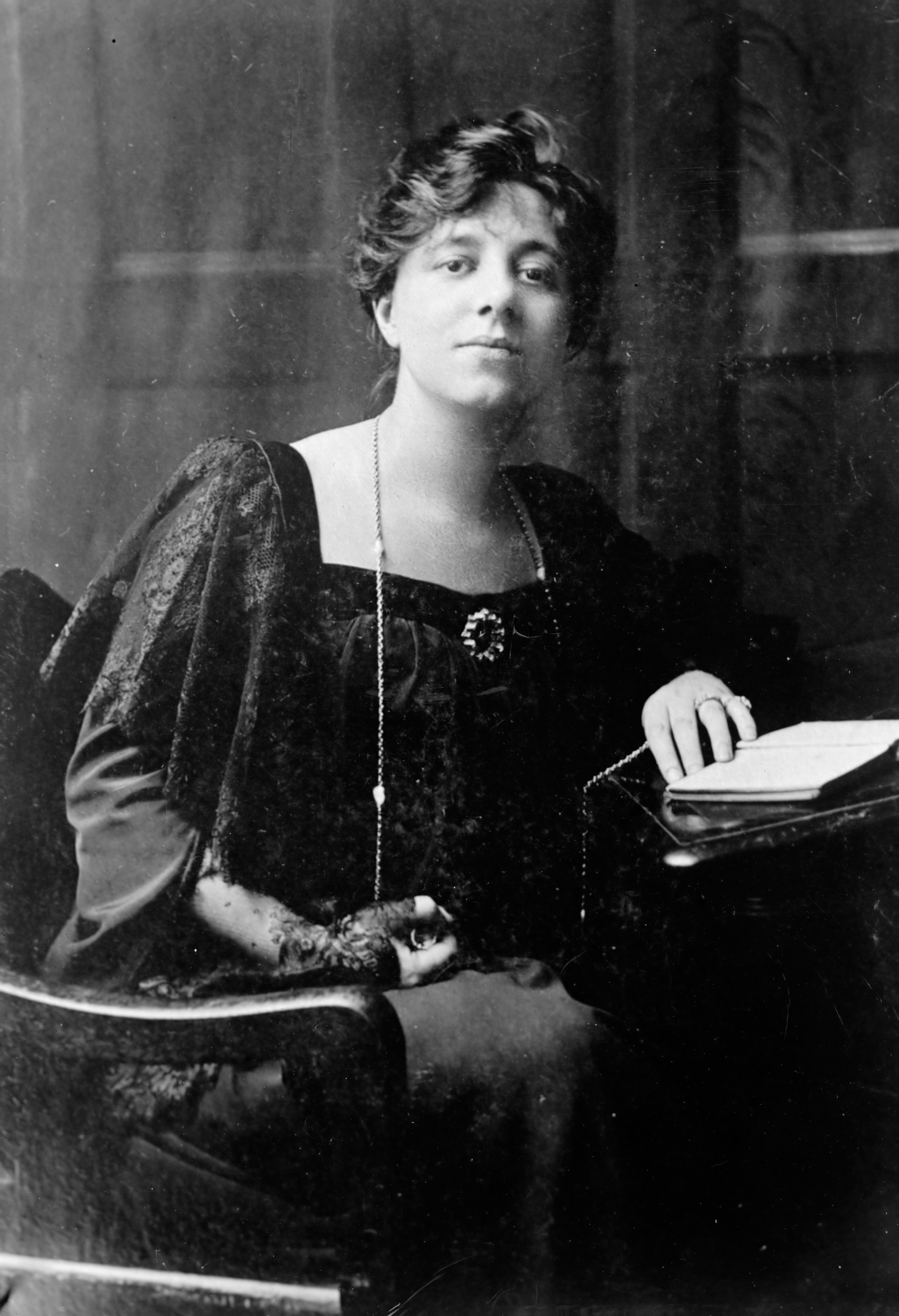
Photograph, possibly during her 1907–1908 tour of the United States

Laurence Alma-Tadema CBE (August 1865 – 12 March 1940), born Laurense Tadema, was a British writer of the late 19th and early 20th centuries who worked in many genres.

== Early life ==
Alma-Tadema was born in Brussels in 1865. She was the eldest daughter of the Dutch painter Lawrence Alma-Tadema (1836–1912) and his first wife Marie-Pauline Gressin-Dumoulin de Boisgirard. Laurence lived in the cottage "The Fair Haven", Wittersham, Kent, and she involved herself with music and plays with the villagers and their children, going on to construct a building to seat a hundred people, used for musical concerts and plays, which she named "Hall of Happy Hours". She mostly divided her time between a flat in Paris and her cottage in Wittersham. She never married, and died in a nursing home in London on 12 March 1940. Her stepmother, Lady Laura Theresa Alma-Tadema (1852–1909) and younger sister Anna Alma-Tadema (1867–1943) were noted visual artists.

== Literary work ==
Alma-Tadema's first novel, Love's Martyr, was published in 1886. In addition to her own collections of stories and poems, which she often published herself, Alma-Tadema wrote two novels, songs and works on drama; she also made translations. The Orlando Project says about Alma-Tadema's writing that the "characteristic tone is one of intense emotion, but in prose and verse she has the gift of compression". She contributed widely to periodicals, notably The Yellow Book, and also edited one herself. Some of Alma-Tadema's plays were successfully produced in Germany.

Alma-Tadema's poem "If No One Ever Marries Me", written in 1897 and published in Realms of Unknown Kings, saw performances as a song in the 21st century by Natalie Merchant on her double album Leave Your Sleep. In 1900 it had been included in the musical score, The daisy chain, cycle of twelve songs of childhood by Liza Lehmann, and in 1922 in the musical score Little girls composed by Louise Sington.

== Political activities ==
Alma-Tadema had a close association with Poland. She was secretary of the "Poland and the Polish Victims Relief Fund" from 1915 to 1939. She was an admirer and long-term associate of Ignacy Jan Paderewski both as far as his music and political activities were concerned, notably on Polish independence. Alma-Tadema maintained a correspondence with him from 1915 to the end of her life. Some of her papers are deposited with the Bodleian Library at the University of Oxford. She was appointed CBE in 1918.

== American tour ==
Alma-Tadema, who had socialist leanings, travelled to America in 1907 to tour the country widely. She gave a series of readings on the "Meaning of Happiness", which proved exceedingly popular. She also spoke on the plight of the divided Poland and asked her audience to express their feelings for this cause.

== Bibliography ==
- Love's Martyr, Longmans, London, Green, and Co., (1886), hardcover, 208 pages; New York, D. Appleton (1886)
- One Way of Love: A Play (1893), Edinburgh : R. & R. Clark, 54 pages
- The wings of Icarus: being the life of one Emilia Fletcher, revealed by herself in I. Thirty-five letters, written to Constance Norris between July 18th, 188–, and March 26th of the following year; II. A fragmentary journal; III. A postscript, MacMillan New York and London, 1894
- The Crucifix, A Venetian Phantasy, and Other Tales, London, Osgood, McIlvaine & Co. (1895), 172 pages
- Realms of unknown kings, London, G. Richards, 1897
- The fate-spinner, London, E.B. Mortlock, 1900
- The Daisy-Chain (Liza Lehmann, L. Alma-Tadema, R.L. Stevenson and others) (1900)
- Songs of childhood, Wrotham, Kent, Herb O'Grace, 1902.
- Songs of womanhood, London: Grant Richards, 1903, hardcover, 117 pages
- Four plays, London, Green Sheaf, 1905
- Tales from my garden: three fairy tales, coauthored with Pamela Colman Smith, London, The Green Sheaf, 1906
- The meaning of happiness : a discourse, London, Elkin Mathews, 1909
- A few lyrics, London, E. Mathews, 1909
- Mother Goose Nursery Rhymes : Proverbs and Rhyme Games, illustrated by Charles Robinson, foreword by Laurence Alma-Tadema, Collins Clear-Type Press, London, c. 1910, hardcover, 208 pages
- Chopin. A discourse ... Translated from the Polish by Laurence Alma Tadema, Ignace Jan Paderewski, London, W. Adlington, 1911
- Pelleas and Melisanda and the Sightless Two Plays By Maurice Maeterlinck, translation by Laurence Alma-Tadema, Walter Scott Ltd., London, hardcover and G. Allen and Unwin, London {1914}
- Poland, Russia and the war, St. Catherine press (1915)
- A Child's Garden of Verses ... With an introduction by Laurence Alma Tadema. Illustrated by Kate Elizabeth Olver. by Robert Louis Stevenson; Kate Elizabeth Olver; Laura Theresa Alma-Tadema, London & Glasgow, : Collins' Clear-Type Press, [1927]
- Little bo Peep's Story Book, Laurence Alma-Tadema, John Lea, and others, Children's Press, London, hardcover
- A Gleaner's Sheaf. Verses., London: St. Martin's Press (1927)
- The divine orbit : seventeen sonnets, Wittersham [Kent], s.n., London, Printed by Finden Brown & Co., 1933
- Playgrounds (single poem)
