= Anna Alma-Tadema =

British artist

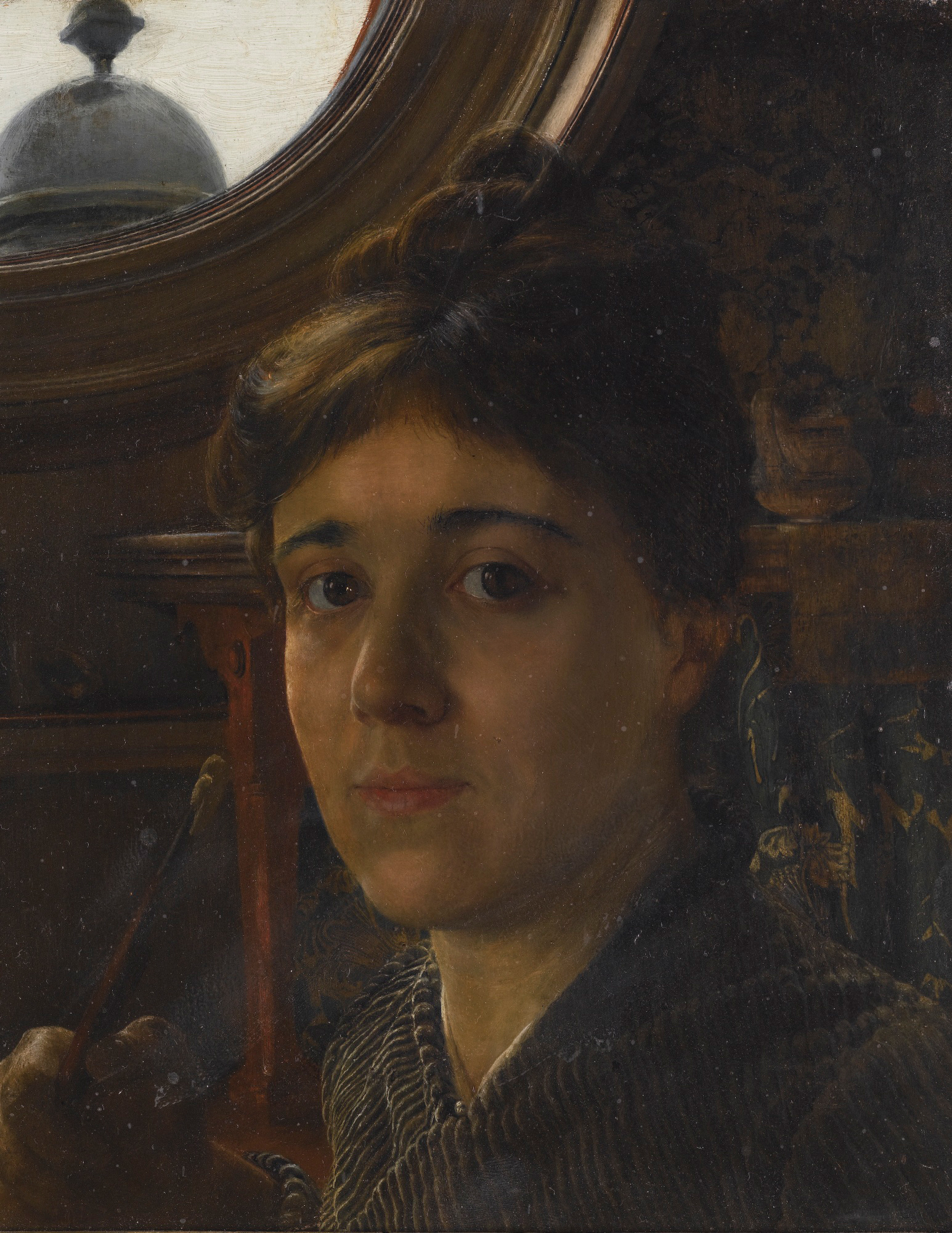
- Anna Alma-Tadema, Self Portrait, c. 1892. Private Collection.
- Born: Anna Tadema; 16 May 1867; Brussels, Belgium
- Died: 5 July 1943 (aged 76); London
- Known for: Painting, drawing

Anna Alma-Tadema (née Tadema; 16 May 1867 – 5 July 1943) was a British artist and suffragette.

Alma-Tadema primarily worked with drawings and paintings, creating many portraits and representations of interior scenes, flowers and buildings. She was influenced by her father, Sir Lawrence Alma-Tadema, and showed her works at exhibitions with him and her step-mother, Laura Theresa Alma-Tadema (née Epps). Her work was shown at national exhibitions, including the Royal Academy of Arts and the 1893 World's Columbian Exposition in Chicago.

Anna Alma-Tadema was recognized for her achievements as an artist at the 1893 World's Columbian Exposition in Chicago and the 1889 Paris Exhibition.

== Early life ==
Anna Tadema was the second daughter of Dutch painter Sir Lawrence Alma-Tadema and his French wife, Marie-Pauline Gressin-Dumoulin de Boisgirard, who lived in Brussels. Her older sister, Laurense, was born in 1865. The girls' mother died in 1869. Lawrence and his daughters then moved to England. Her father married for the second time to Laura Epps in 1871, when Anna was four years old.

Anna Alma-Tadema was raised in London with her family. Laurense received her education at home and it is believed that Anna was home-schooled as well. Anna appears at least twice in paintings by her father. In 1873, she and her sister were depicted in This is Our Corner, and then in 1883, her father painted her portrait.

Anna's mother, father and step-mother were painters, and as a result, she was raised in a very artistic household.

Sir Lawrence was inspired by words from antiquity and developed a style that was emulated by Laura, Anna and other artists. Once he died, the popularity of his works and style waned for about six decades. Anna's sister, Laurense, was a poet, painter, novelist, critic, playwright, and short story author.

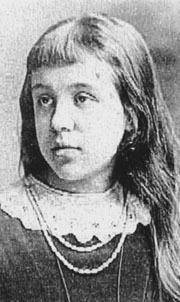
Anna Alma-Tadema, portrait photograph

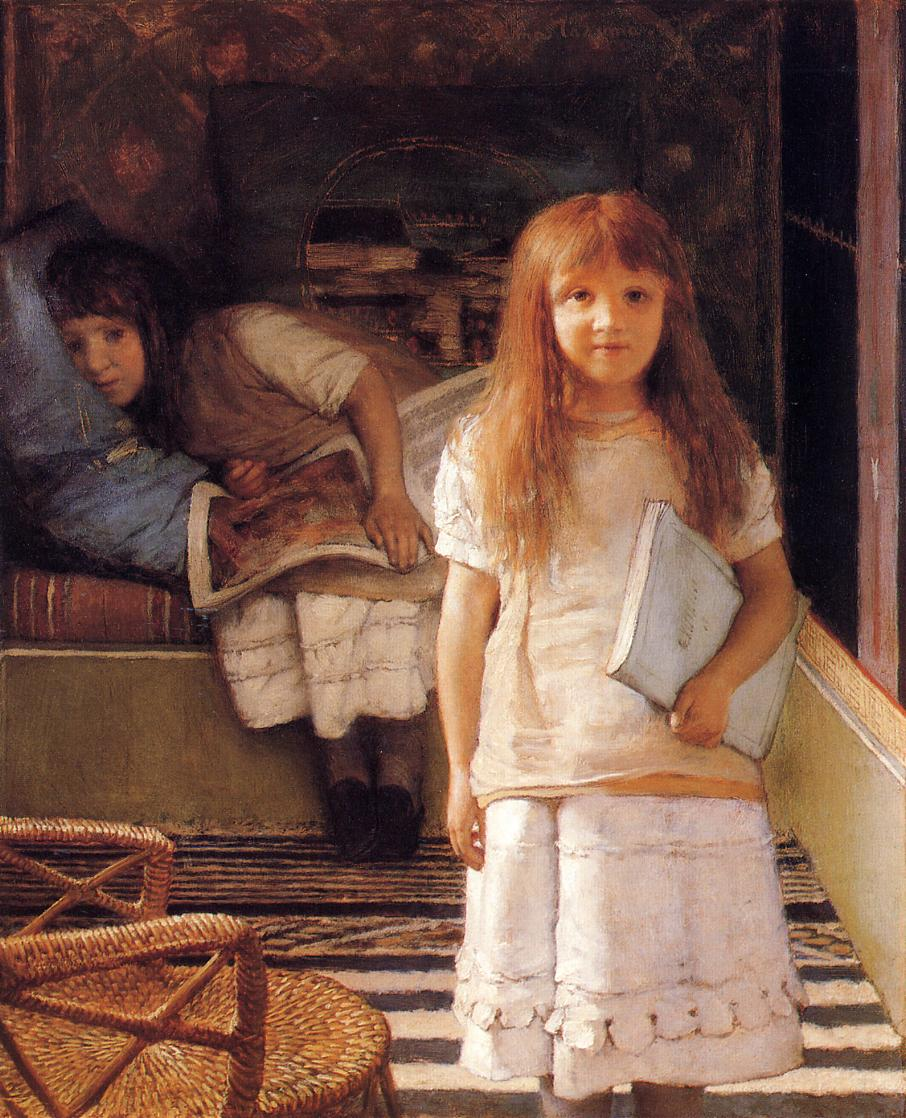
Sir Lawrence Alma-Tadema, This is Our Corner, also known as Laurense and Anna Alma-Tadema, oil on panel, 1873. Van Gogh Museum, Amsterdam.

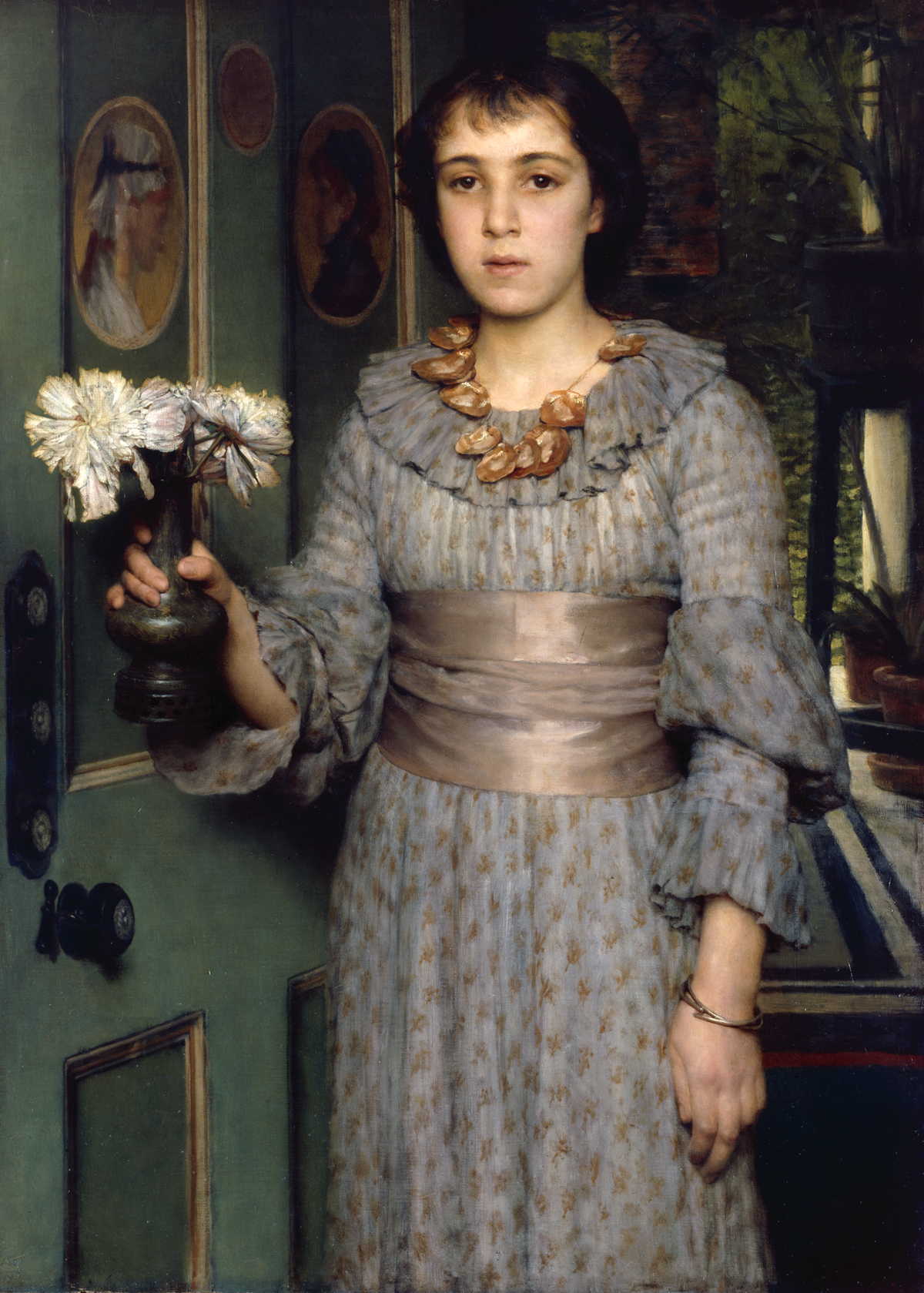
Sir Lawrence Alma-Tadema, Anna Alma Tadema, oil on canvas, 1883. Royal Academy of Arts.

== Work as an artist ==
Anna Alma-Tadema was described by biographer Helen Zimmern as a "delicate, dainty artist who has inherited so much of her father's power for reproducing detail." During her time as an artist, Anna Alma-Tadema created several portraits, representations of flowers, as well as watercolor depictions of house interiors and buildings. One such example of Alma-Tadema's portraits is Miss Tessa Gosse. This and other works, such as The Misty Valley and The Gold Room, were shown at the Royal Academy of Arts.

She made watercolours of the interior of the Alma-Tadema family house, Townshend House in Tichfield Terrace, near Regent's Park in London. The family home was extravagantly decorated by her father to resemble a Roman villa. The Drawing Room, which Alma-Tadema painted when she was a teenager, was exhibited in 1893 at the Columbian Exposition in Chicago. Additionally, in 1885, she painted The Gold Room, which also represented the interior of the family home.

A picture of the actress Gladys Cooper as a girl which Alma-Tadema made (medium unknown) appeared on the front page of Tatler in 1915.

Alma-Tadema exhibited her works in England for approximately forty years, between 1885 and 1928. Alma-Tadema showed fifteen works at the Royal Academy between 1885 and 1928, including The Gold Room, Miss Tessa Gosse, The Misty Valley, and The Idler's Harvest. Although she resided in London, Anna Alma-Tadema also exhibited works abroad. In 1889, she won a medal at an exhibition in Paris. Additionally, Anna, her father, and her stepmother, Laura, all exhibited and won prizes at the World's Columbian Exposition at Chicago in 1893.

Anna Alma-Tadema's works continue to be exhibited today. For example, the artist's works were included within the April 2011 Victoria and Albert Museum's exhibition, The Cult of Beauty: The Aesthetic Movement 1860–1900 in London, as well as the Clark Art Institute's 2025 exhibit A Room of Her Own: Women Artists-Activists in Britain, 1875-1945.

== Selected works ==
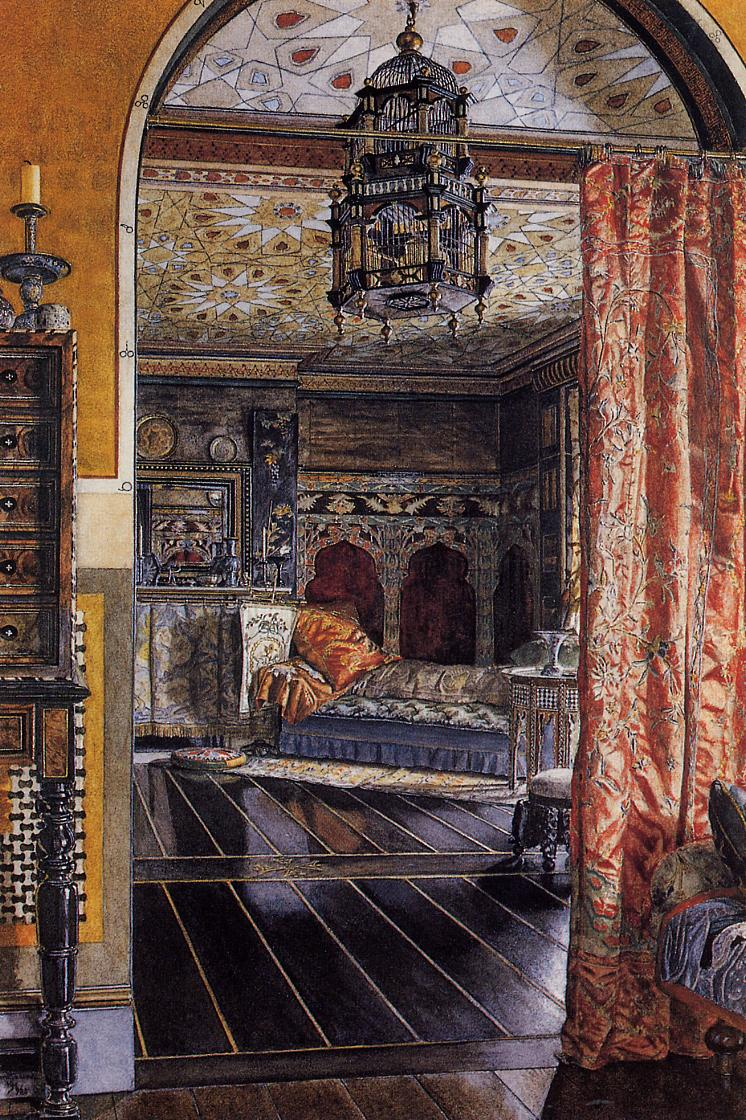
Anna Alma-Tadema, The Drawing Room, Townshend House, 1885. Royal Academy of Arts, London.

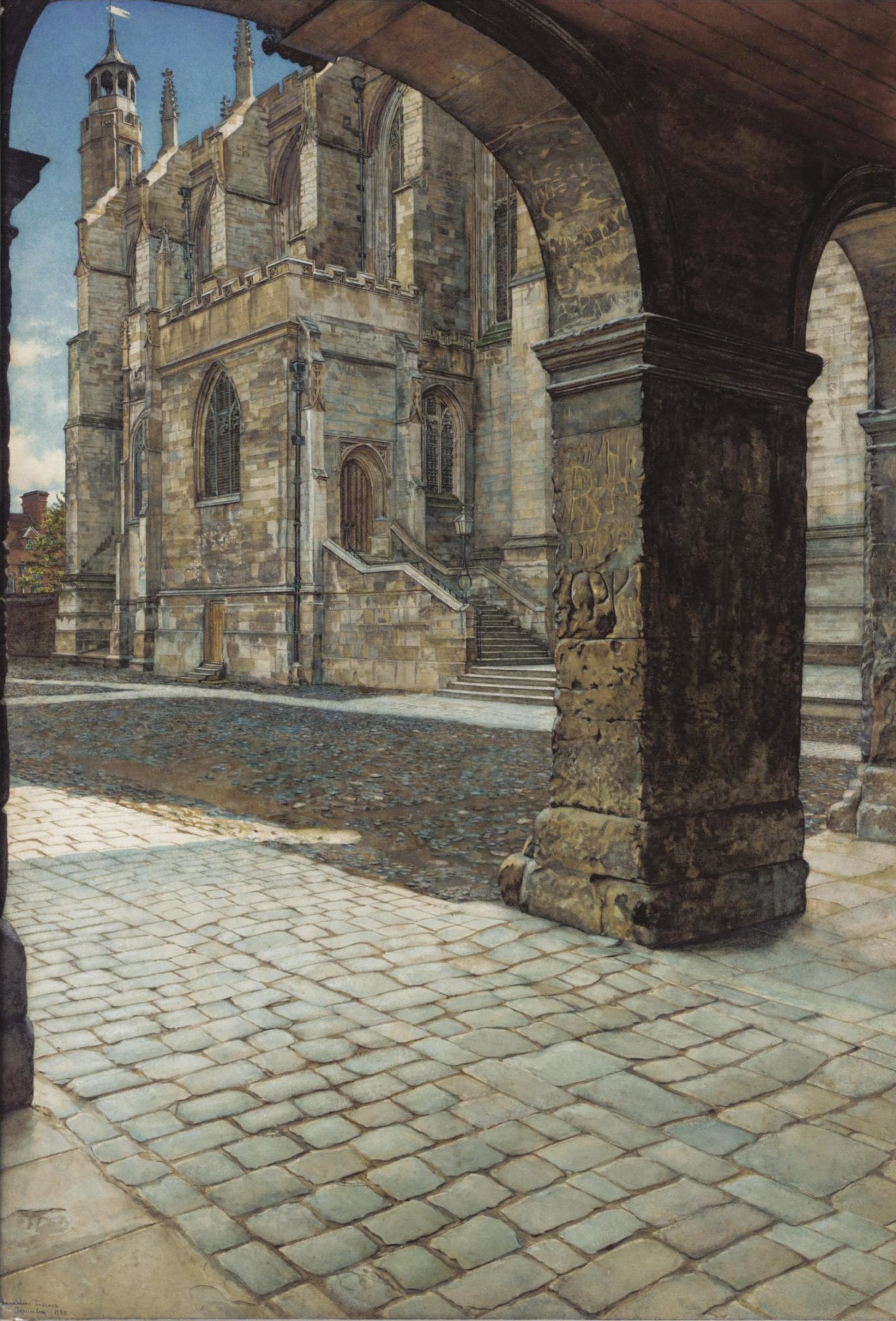
Anna Alma-Tadema, Eton College Chapel, 1886. Private collection.

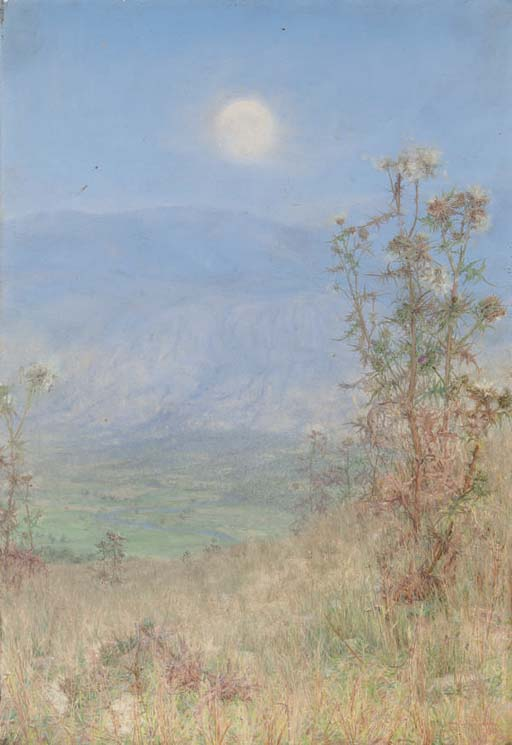
Anna Alma-Tadema, The Idler's Harvest, 1900. Private collection.

== Personal life ==
Alma-Tadema was committed to women's suffrage and signed the Some Supporters of the Women's Suffrage Movement in 1897.

Neither Anna Alma-Tadema or her sister ever married. They did not enjoy successful careers in their later years.
