= Michael Ryan (physician) =

British physician and author

Michael Ryan (1800–1840) was a British physician and author,

== Life ==
The Oxford Dictionary of National Biography states that Ryan was probably born in Ireland. His medical training took place in Dublin and Edinburgh. He then went into practice in Kilkenny for some years, moving to London in 1829.

Ryan was a member of the Royal College of Physicians in London, where he practised, and was a physician to the Metropolitan Free Hospital. He also took on a number of lecturing posts. He died in London on 11 December 1840, leaving a young family.

== Works ==
In 1831, Ryan published part of a course of lectures on medical jurisprudence under the title Lectures on Population, Marriage, and Divorce as Questions of State Medicine, comprising an Account of the Causes and Treatment of Impotence and Sterility. These lectures were delivered at the medical theatre Hatton Garden. In the same year appeared the completed form of his Manual of Medical Jurisprudence, being an Analysis of a Course of Lectures on Forensic Medicine. A second and enlarged edition was issued in 1836, an edition with notes by R. E. Griffith, M.D., having been published in Philadelphia in 1832. In 1831 also appeared the third edition, of Ryan's Manual of Midwifery … comprising a new Nomenclature of Obstetric Medicine, with a concise Account of the Symptoms and Treatment of the most important Diseases of Women and Children. An enlarged edition was issued in 1841, rewritten, and containing 120 figures. The Atlas of Obstetricity had been issued separately in 1840. An American edition of the Manual appeared at Burlington, Vermont, in 1835.

In editing from 1832 to 1838 the original London Medical and Surgical Journal, Ryan had some assistance from James Fernandez Clarke. His later publications included The Philosophy of Marriage in its Social, Moral, and Physical Relations; with an Account of the Diseases of the Genito-Urinary Organs and the Physiology of Generation in the Vegetable and Animal Kingdom, 1837; this formed part of a course of obstetric lectures delivered at the North London School of Medicine. Twelve editions in all, the last in 1867, were issued. This work contained an attack on extreme proponents of birth control. It was followed in 1839 by Prostitution in London, with a Comparative View of that of Paris and New York … with an Account of the Nature and Treatment of the various Diseases. The historian Peter Gay classifies it as an "alarmist" work on prostitution, comparable to James Beard Talbot's Miseries of Prostitution, which appeared five years later.

Ryan also published The Medico-Chirurgical Pharmacopœia, 1837, 2nd ed. 1839; and Thomas Denman's Obstetrician's Vade-Mecum, edited and augmented, 1836. He translated and added to Le Nouveau Formulaire pratique des Hôpitaux by Henri Milne-Edwards and Pierre Vavasseur.
