= Quantock =

Quantock may mean:

== Arts ==
- "Quantocking" and "Quantocking II", two episodes of Peep Show about visiting the Quantock Hills

== Buildings ==
- Quantock Lodge, a mansion in Somerset, UK

== Organisations ==
- Friends of Quantock, a conservation organisation in the Quantock Hills
- Quantock Motor Services, a bus operator in Somerset, UK

== People ==
- David E. Quantock, the United States Army Inspector General
- Rod Quantock, Australian comedian

== Places ==
- Quantock Hills, Somerset, UK
  - Quantock Greenway, a path in the Quantock Hills
- Quantock, Saskatchewan
- Vale of Taunton and Quantock Fringes

== Ships ==
- HMS Quantock (L58)
