= Natural areas of England =

The Natural Areas of England are regions, officially designated by Natural England, each with a characteristic association of wildlife and natural features. More formally, they are defined as "biogeographic zones which reflect the geological foundation, the natural systems and processes and the wildlife in different parts of England...".

There are 120 Natural Areas in England ranging from the North Pennines to the Dorset Heaths and from The Lizard to The Fens. They were first defined in 1996 by English Nature and the Countryside Commission, with help from English Heritage. They produced a map of England that depicts the natural and cultural dimensions of the landscape.

Natural Areas are assessed by Natural England, the UK Government's advisor on the natural environment, to be "a sensible scale at which to view the wildlife resource, from both a national and local perspective". Natural Areas were also used by English Nature as an "ecologically coherent framework for setting objectives for nature conservation."

Many Natural Areas coincide with a further natural division referred to as National Character Areas; however, in other cases a Natural Area may contain two or more National Character Areas.

== Natural Areas by region ==
=== North East ===
1. North Northumberland Coastal Plain
2. Border Uplands
4. North Pennines
5. Northumbria Coal Measures
6. Durham Magnesian Limestone Plateau
7. Tees Lowlands
98. Northumberland Coast
99. Tyne to Tees Coast

=== North West ===
3. Solway Basin
9. Eden Valley
10. Cumbria Fells and Dales
11. West Cumbria Coastal Plain
12. Forest of Bowland
13. Lancashire Plain and Valleys
14. Southern Pennines
26. Urban Mersey Basin
117. Liverpool Bay
118. Morecambe Bay
119. Cumbrian Coast
120. Solway Firth

=== Yorkshire ===
8. Yorkshire Dales
14. Southern Pennines
15. Pennine Dales Fringe
16. Vale of York and Mowbray
17. North York Moors and Hills
18. Vale of Pickering
19. Yorkshire Wolds
20. Holderness
21. Humber Estuary
22. Humberhead Levels
23. Southern Magnesian Limestone
24. Coal Measures
34. North Lincolnshire Coversands and Clay Vales
35. Lincolnshire Wolds
36. Lincolnshire Coast and Marshes
100. Saltburn to Bridlington
101. Bridlington to Skegness

=== West Midlands ===
25. Dark Peak
27. Meres and Mosses
28. Potteries and Churnet Valley
29. South West Peak
30. White Peak
31. Derbyshire Peak Fringe and Lower Derwent
40. Needwood and South Derbyshire Claylands
41. Oswestry Uplands
42. Shropshire Hills
43. Midlands Plateau
44. Midland Clay Pastures
56. Severn and Avon Vales
57. Malvern Hills and Teme Valley
58. Clun and North West Herefordshire Hills
59. Central Herefordshire
60. Black Mountains and Golden Valley
51. Dean Plateau and Wye Valley
116. Severn Estuary

=== East Midlands ===
32. Sherwood
33. Trent Valley and Rises
34. North Lincolnshire Coversands and Clay Vales
35. Lincolnshire Wolds
36. Lincolnshire Coast and Marshes
37. The Fens
38. Lincolnshire and Rutland Limestone
39. Charnwood
44. Midland Clay Pastures
45. Rockingham Forest
52. West Anglian Plain
53. Bedfordshire Greensand Ridge
54. Yardley-Whittlewood Ridge
102. The Wash

=== East of England ===
37. The Fens
46. Breckland
47. North Norfolk
48. The Broads
49. Suffolk Coast and Heaths
50. East Anglian Plain
51. East Anglian Chalk
52. West Anglian Plain
53. Bedfordshire Greensand Ridge
54. Yardley-Whittlewood Ridge
65. Chilterns
66. London Basin
67. Greater Thames Estuary
102. The Wash
103. Old Hunstanton to Sheringham
104. Sheringham to Lowestoft
105. Suffolk Coast

=== South East ===
63. Thames and Avon Vales
64. Midvale Ridge
65. Chilterns
66. London Basin
67. Greater Thames Estuary
68. North Kent Plain
69. North Downs
70. Wealden Greensand
71. Romney Marshes
72. High Weald
73. Low Weald and Pevensey
74. South Downs
75. South Coast Plain and Hampshire Lowlands
76. Isle of Wight
77. New Forest
78. Hampshire Downs
79. Berkshire and Marlborough Downs
106. North Kent Coast
107. East Kent Coast
108. Folkestone to Selsey Bill
109. Solent and Poole Bay

=== South West ===
55. Cotswolds
62. Bristol, Avon Valleys and Ridges
63. Thames and Avon Vales
79. Berkshire and Marlborough Downs
80. South Wessex Downs
81. Dorset Heaths
82. Isles of Portland and Purbeck
83. Wessex Vales
84. Mendip Hills
85. Somerset Levels and Moors
86. Mid Somerset Hills
87. Exmoor and the Quantocks
88. Vale of Taunton and Quantock Fringes
89. Blackdowns
90. Devon Redlands
91. South Devon
92. Dartmoor
93. The Culm
94. Bodmin Moor
95. Cornish Killas and Granites
96. West Penwith
97. The Lizard
110. South Dorset Coast
111. Lyme Bay
112. Start Point to Land's End
113. Isles of Scilly
114. Land's End to Minehead
115. Bridgwater Bay
116. Severn Estuary
