= Cockercombe =

Hamlet in Somerset, England

Coordinates: 51.122°N 3.168°W

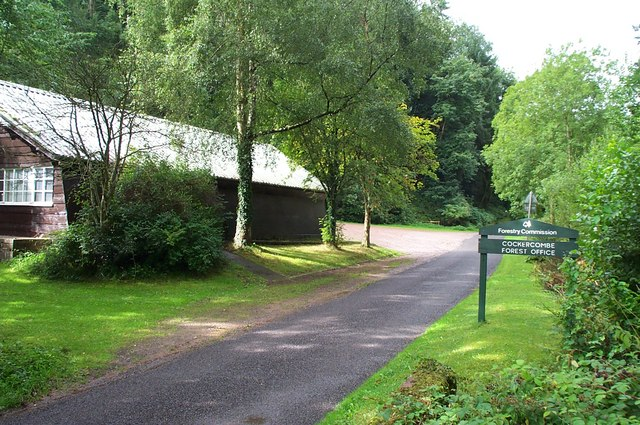
- Cockercombe Forest Office

- Location within Somerset
- OS grid reference: ST183365
- Civil parish: Over Stowey
- Unitary authority: Somerset Council
- Ceremonial county: Somerset
- Region: South West
- Country: England
- Sovereign state: United Kingdom
- Post town: BRIDGWATER
- Postcode district: TA5
- Police: Avon and Somerset
- Fire: Devon and Somerset
- Ambulance: South Western
- UK Parliament: Bridgwater

Cockercombe is a hamlet within the civil parish of Over Stowey in Somerset, England, approximately 15 kilometres (9.3 mi) north-northwest by road from the centre of Taunton. It contains the Grade II listed Mill Cottage and a Forestry Office.

== Geography and geology ==
Cockercombe lies in the foot of the Quantock Hills. The Cockercombe Stream flows in the vicinity. Upstream, the steam crosses between Pepper Hill and Plainsfield.

Cockercombe tuff, a greenish-grey, hard sedimentary rock, is only found in this area.

== Landmarks ==
The Forestry Commission has an office in Cockercombe. Mill Cottage is a Grade II listed thatched cottage in the hamlet, which was originally built in the early 17th century. It was restored to acclaim in 1998 following a fire and has a new thatched roof. The cottage overlooks the Mill stream. The house is set in about 4.17 acres and has a wooden stable block with three stables.

== Recreation ==
Mountain biking events are held in the area. The Cockercombe Hill Climb was hosted by Somerset Road Club on Sunday 8 September 2019.
