= Adscombe Chapel =

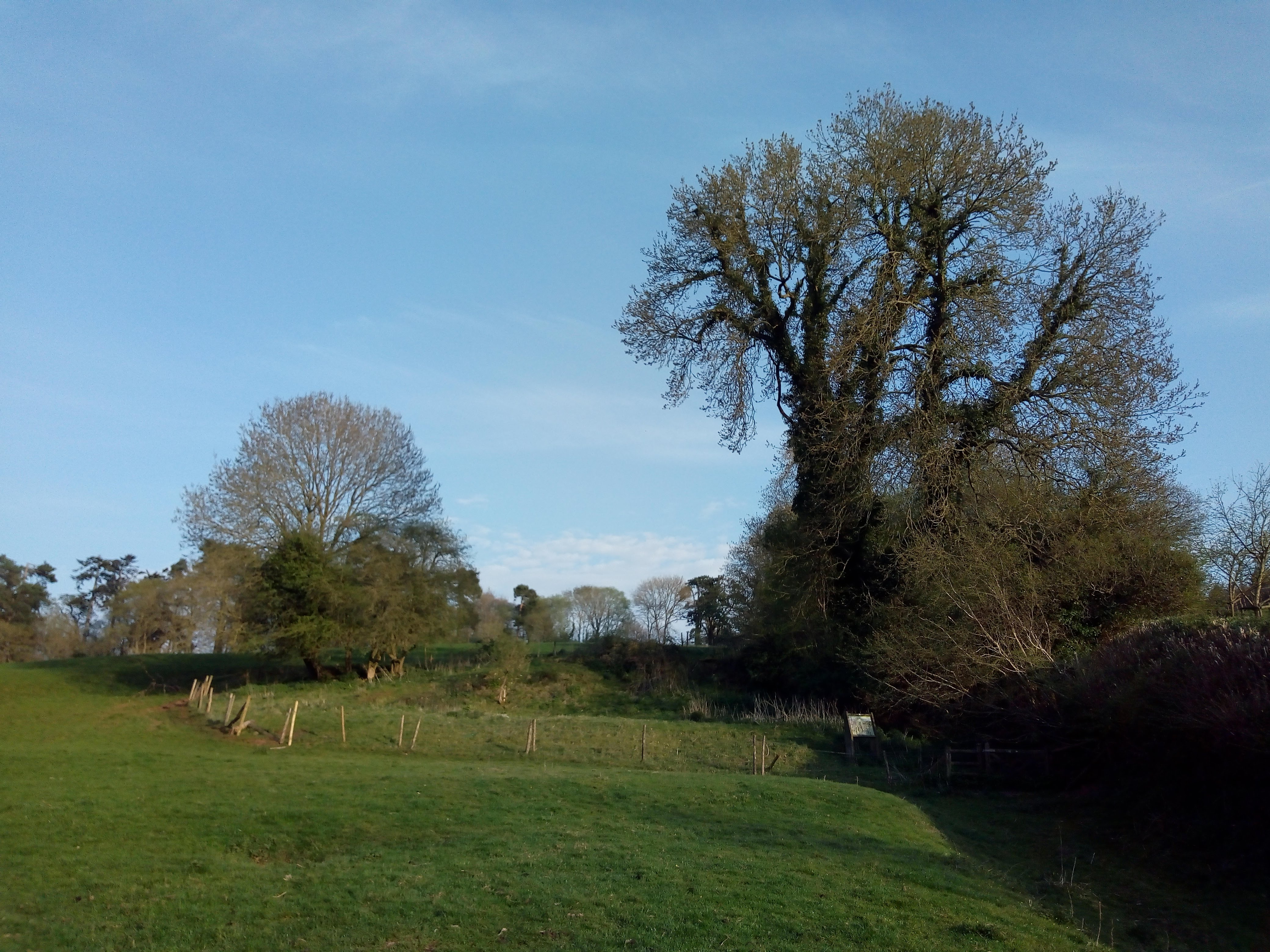
- View of the site of the chapel

- Location within Somerset
- 51°8′1.8517″N 3°10′4.8483″W
- Type: Church
- Location: Sedgemoor
- OS grid reference: ST 18414 37782

Site notes
- Area: Somerset

Scheduled monument
- Official name: Chapel E of Adscombe Farm
- Designated: 30 March 1977
- Reference no.: 1006133

Adscombe Chapel is the remains of a medieval chapel, located 280 metres (920 ft) east of Adscombe Farm in Somerset, UK, situated on the north-west facing slope of a prominent ridge.

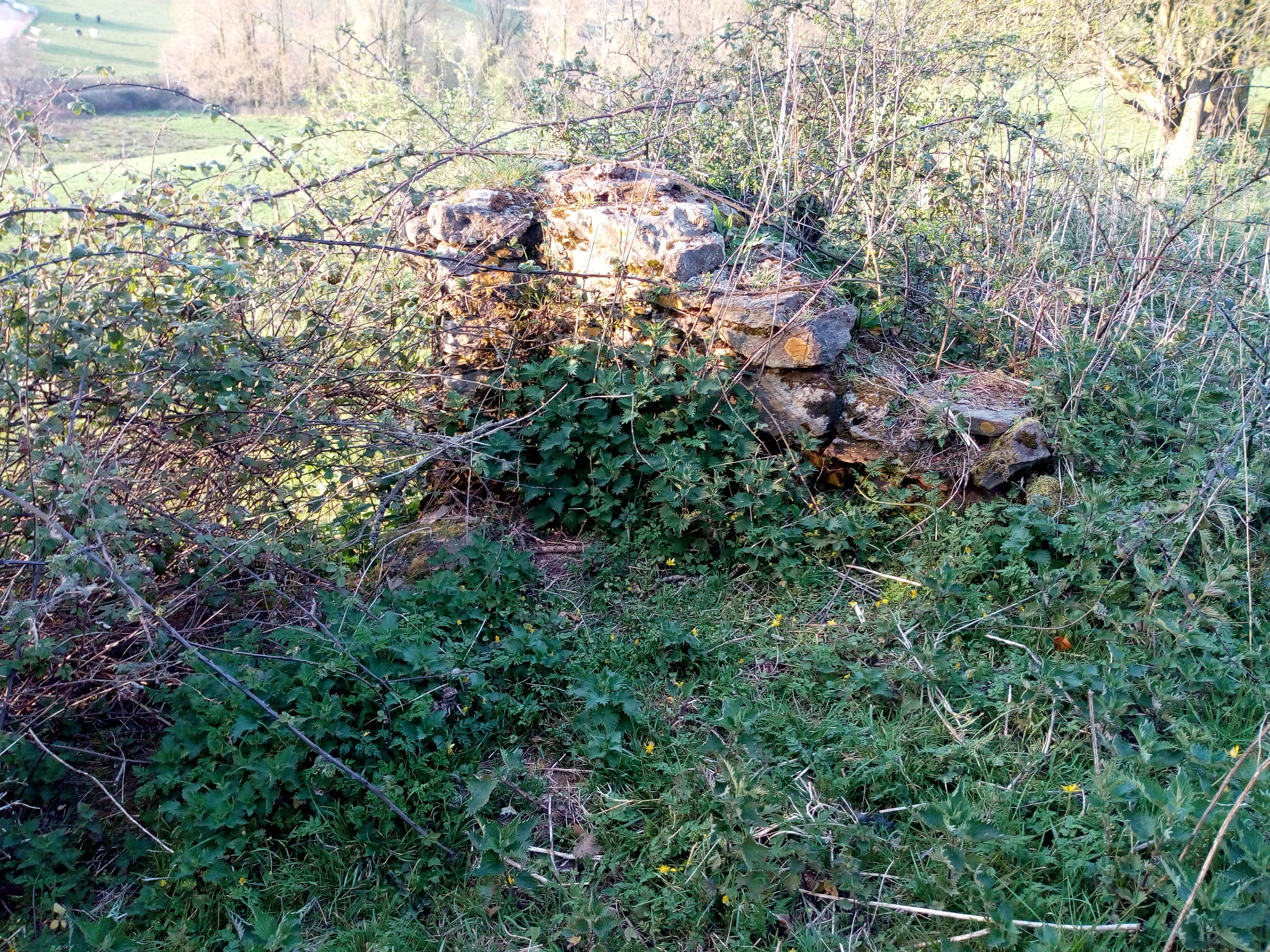
Adscombe Chapel fragment of masonry 01

This 13th Century chapel of the Virgin Mary was built at Adscombe by the monks of Athelney Abbey.

In 1535 Johan Broke of Over Stowey bequeathed one sheep to 'Our Lady of Addescombe' — this is the earliest official record of this chapel.

A high, gable-end wall to roof height, with a high window with a door beneath, were still standing in 1903, however now only small sections remain. Enough remains to show it was a single roomed building of 16 metres (52 ft) by 7 metres (23 ft). The surviving walls, which are up to 0.6 metres (2 ft) thick, remain standing up to a height of 1.3 metres (4 ft). Within the limited remains there is door mouldings and sections of window. The chapel is on a terraced area of approximately 25 metres (82 ft) by 15 metres (49 ft).

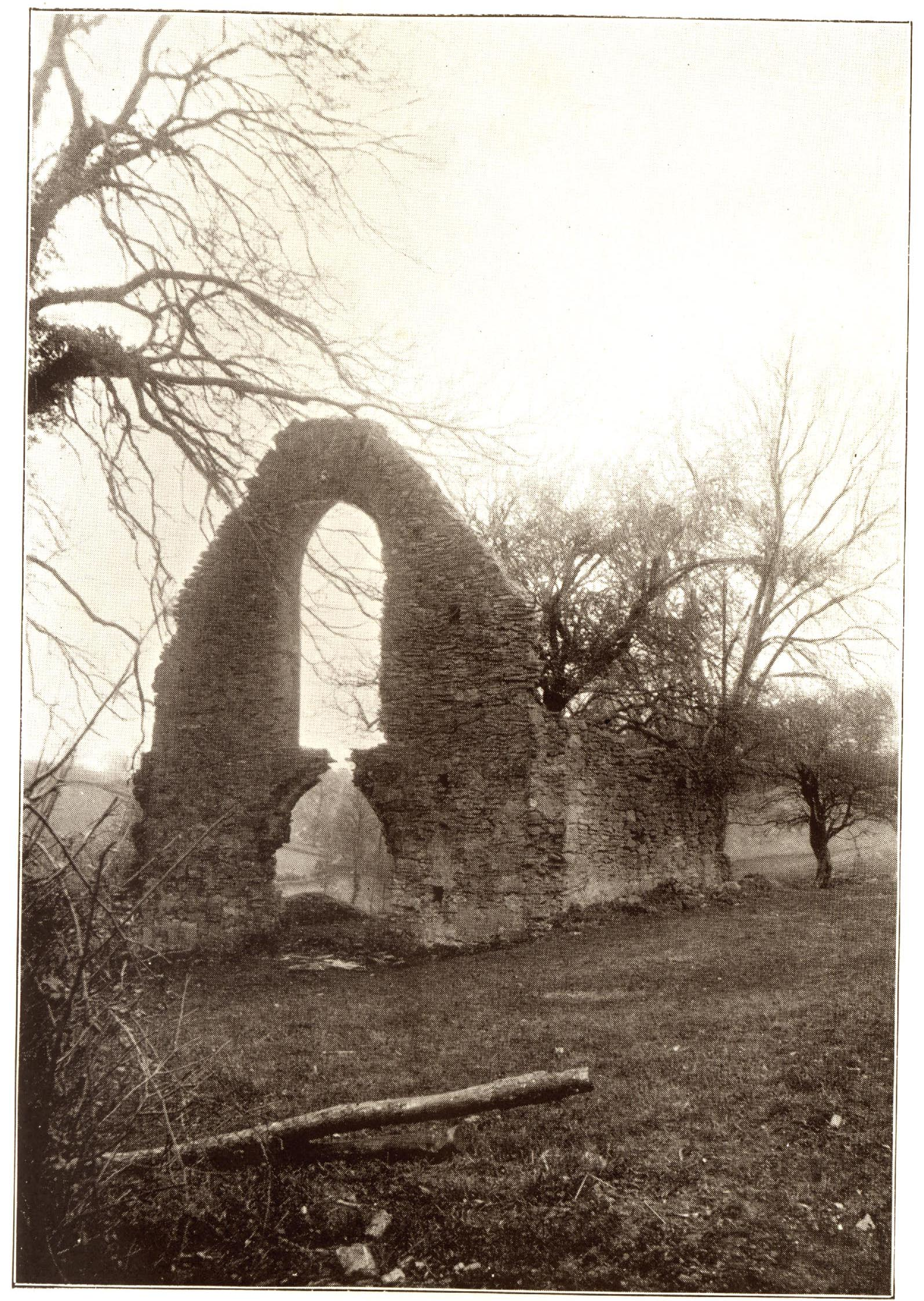
Ruins of the Chapel at Adscombe in about 1903

The Chapel was built of local Devonian sandstone and the bases of substantial buttresses can be seen at the west end. The west window was framed in a simple carved stone surround. The chapel probably dates from the middle of the 13th century or the beginning of the 14th century.

Adscombe currently is a small hamlet with an old farmhouse and a few 'cottages' along the lane opposite the chapel. Adscombe is located roughly 135 miles (217 km) west of London, and 45 miles (72 km) south-west of Bristol. The chapel's location is typical of many settlements in the Quantock Hills, at the foot of a combe and bordering former common land. The Quantock Hills are one of a few remaining expanses of open moorland in southern Britain. This area has archeological importance due to many monuments highlighting the exploitation of the land in the Bronze Age and Iron Age, including round barrows, cairns, settlements and hillforts.

Adscombe was a settlement in the medieval period; in 1327 four people from Adscombe were wealthy enough to be assessed for tax and in 1547 it had two houses and a ruined tenement. To the east of the chapel is a large earthwork platform the site of a substantial building. In the medieval period, it was probably the manor house of Over Stowey and Fryon (now known as Friarn). The house was called 'Chapel House' and was the home of the Rich family in the 17th century. By the 19th century, it was known as 'Chapples House and Barton' and the chapel was used as a barn. Recent conservation works to the monument have been funded through DEFRA's Countryside Stewardship Scheme.

== Nearby religious sites ==
The Church of St Peter and St Paul is situated in Over Stowey.

== See also ==
- Over Stowey
- Quantock Hills
