= Peart Water =

Stream in Somerset, England

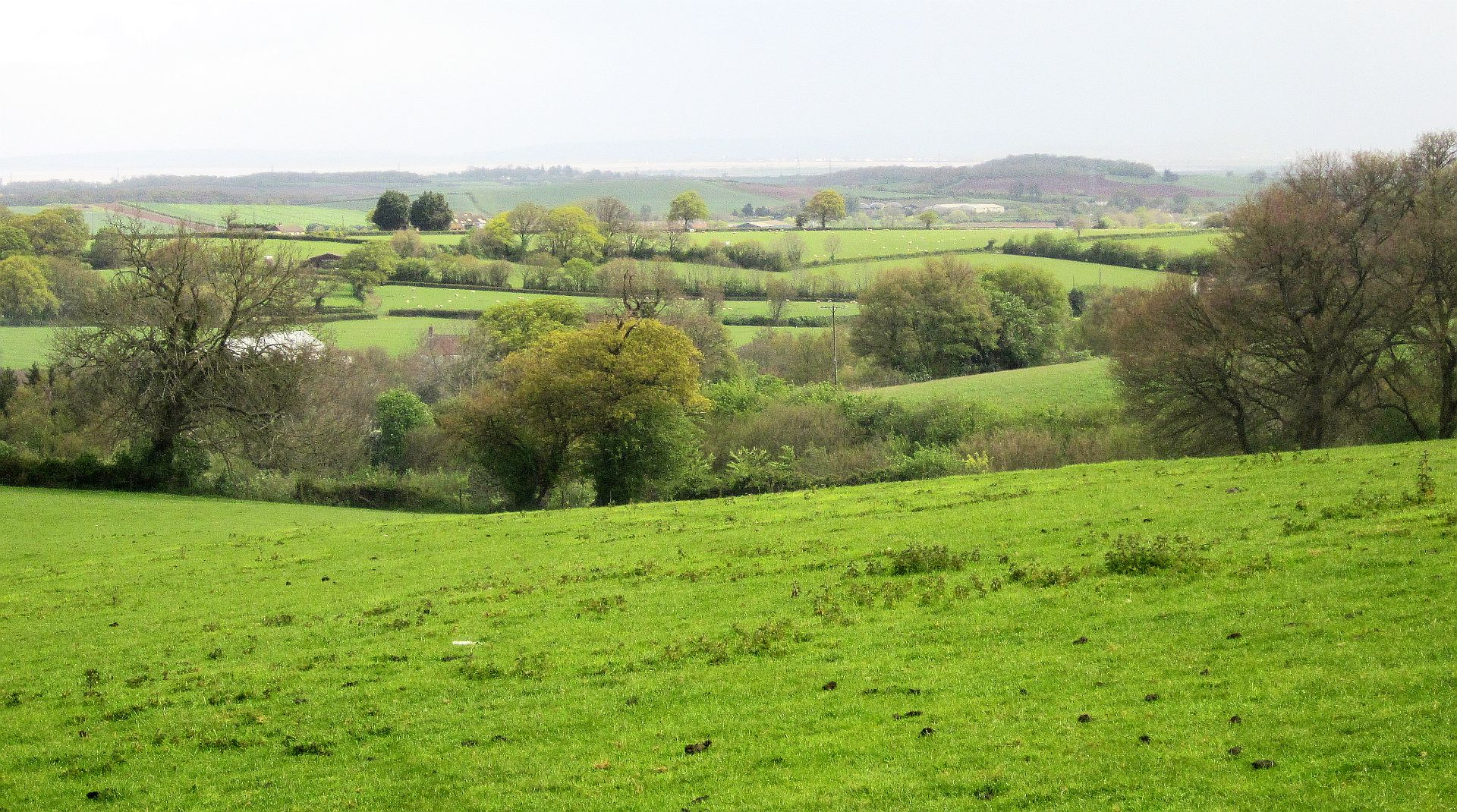
- Countryside east of Hawkridge Reservoir looking down the Peart Water valley

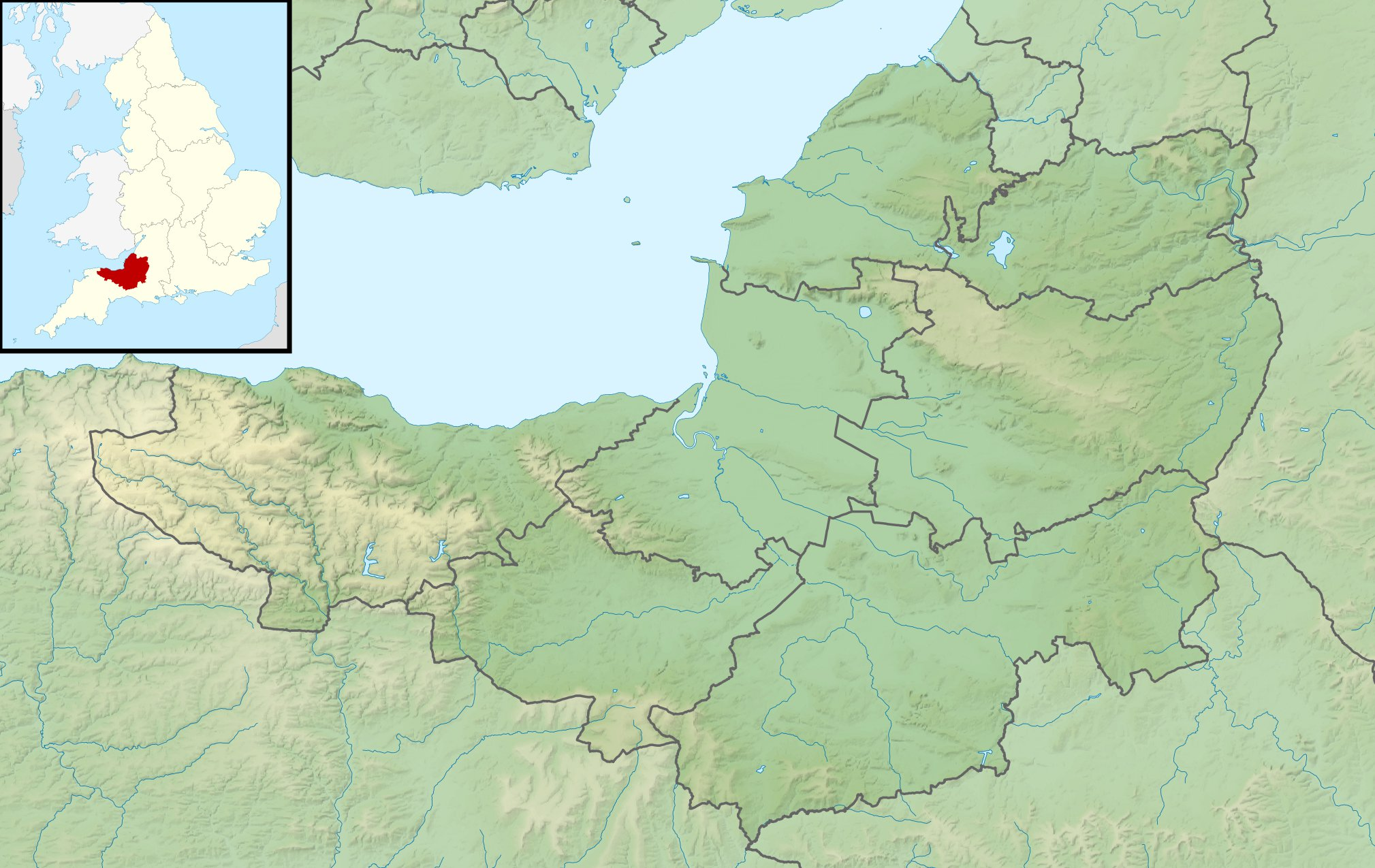
- Peart Water (Somerset)

Location
- Country: England
- County: Somerset

Physical characteristics
- Source
  - coordinates: 51.105579°N 3.181630°W
  - elevation: 280 metres (920 ft)
- Mouth
  - location: Cannington Brook
  - coordinates: 51.140777°N 3.090195°W
  - elevation: 35 metres (115 ft)

Peart Water is a stream about 5 miles (8.0 km) long in Somerset, England. It rises in the Quantock Hills and flows in a generally northeast direction. Fish are raised in the Hawkridge Reservoir, and further downstream the Peart Water powers two mills.

== Course ==
Peart Water rises in the Quantock Hills Area of Natural Beauty in West Somerset. It forms on the Middle Hill in the Quantock Hills at an elevation of about 280 metres (920 ft). It flows in a generally northeast direction for about 2.2 miles (3.5 km) to Hawkridge Reservoir, which was built in the early 1960s to supply water to the Borough of Bridgwater. The reservoir covers about 32 acres (13 ha).

Peart Water flows onward from the dam in a northeast direction to Spaxton, where it enters the Ashford Reservoir. The distance between the two reservoirs is about 2 miles (3.2 km). The Ashford Reservoir has an elevation of almost 35 metres (115 ft). The Peart Water leaves the Ashford Reservoir, and about 5 miles (8.0 km) from its source joins the Currypool stream and forms the Cannington Brook.

== Uses ==
The Hawkridge Reservoir is stocked with trout. In August 1993 notice was published of an application by Wessex Water Services to discharge up to 4,000 cubic metres (140,000 cu ft) of settled effluent daily into the Peart Water from a fish farm at Hawkridge Reservoir. The Currypool Mill, 70 metres (230 ft) west of Ashford Reservoir, was fed by a leat from Peart Water. This used to power an overshot water wheel, which was replaced in 1934 by an Armfield vertical shafted 18" Francis turbine. The turnbine was still being used to power a saw bench in 1976. The stream powers the Twinhill Mill in Spaxton.

== Sources ==
- Booth, M. G. (20 August 1993), "Notice of application for consent in pursuance of section 88 and Schedule JO" (PDF), The London Gazette, National Rivers Authority
- "Currypool Mill, 70m W of Ashford Reservoir, Spaxton", Somerset Historic Environment Record, Somerset County Council, April 1983
- "Peart Water", Somerset Rivers
- Peart Water Source, Rivers of Somerset
- "Twinhill Mill, Spaxton", Mills Archive, The Mills Archive Trust
