= River Holford =

River in Somerset, England

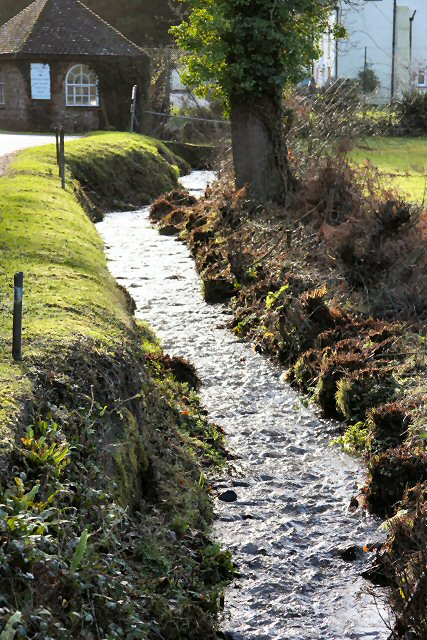
- The River Holford in Holford Combe

Location
- Country: England
- County: Somerset
- City: Holford

Physical characteristics
- Source: Lady's Fountain Spring, Frog Combe
  - location: Halsway, Quantock Hills, Somerset, England
  - coordinates: 51°8′20″N 3°12′56″W
  - elevation: 820 ft (250 m)
- Mouth
  - location: Kilve, Somerset, England
  - coordinates: 51°11′34″N 3°13′37″W
  - elevation: 0 ft (0 m)
- Length: 4.5 mi (7.2 km)

The River Holford is located in the east Quantock Hills Area of Outstanding Natural Beauty in Somerset England.

It is approximately 4.5 miles (7 km) long. Its source is at Lady's Fountain Spring, Frog Combe which is near Halsway and 820 feet (250 m) above sea level before flowing past Holford towards its mouth at Kilve.

The river is used as an outdoor classroom for students of Fluvial Geomorphology.

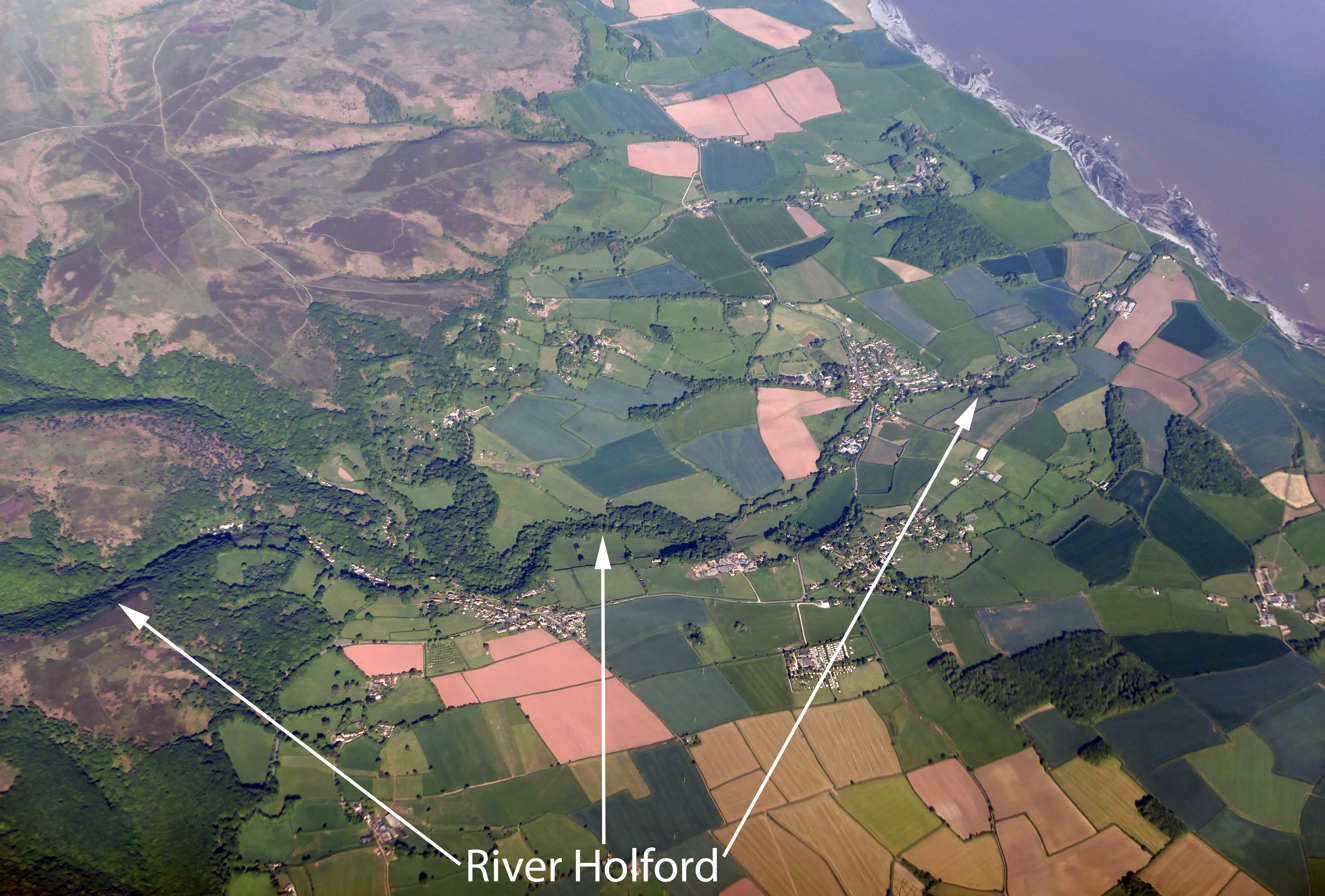
Aerial view of the middle and low part of the river Holford.

The geology of the river consists of three different rock types. At the top of the river there is the Devonian Quartzite (Metamorphic), in the middle of the river there is the Permo-Triassic Marl (Sedimentary) and the lower part of the river consists of Jurassic Limestone (Sedimentary). The first two rock types are impermeable meaning there is little drainage for the river but the river depth becomes smaller as the water flows over the permeable limestone which will allow water to pass through. Quartzite is also very resistant to chemical weathering and can form ridges.
