= Ge-mare Farm Fields =

Protected area in Somerset, England

- Site of Special Scientific Interest
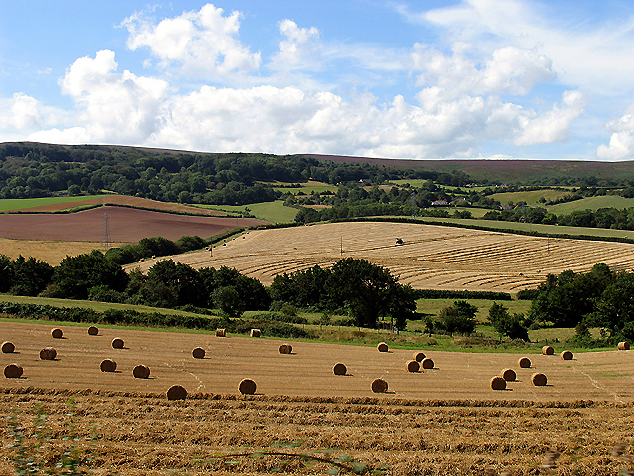

- Location within Somerset
- Location of Ge-mare Farm Fields.
- Area of search: Somerset
- Grid reference: ST155424
- Coordinates: 51.17457°N 3.21013°W
- Interest: Biological
- Area: 4.1 hectares (0.041 km^{2}; 0.016 sq mi)
- Notification date: 1988

Ge-mare Farm Fields (grid reference ST155424) is a 4.1 hectare (10.3 acre) biological Site of Special Scientific Interest near Holford on the Quantock Hills in Somerset, notified in 1988.

The site consists of an unimproved species-rich flood pasture community with interest enhanced by the presence of a wetter area supporting a lowland mire community. These habitats are rare both nationally and within the county of Somerset.
