= Church of St Peter and St Paul, Over Stowey =

Church in Somerset, England

Church Of St Peter And St Paul
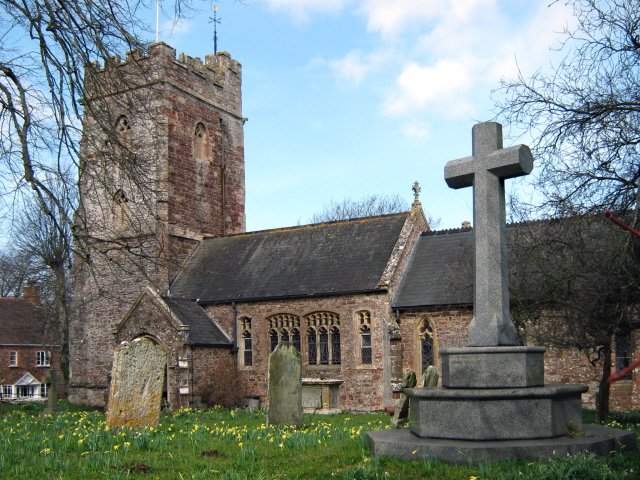
- The Church from the South with the Henry Stanley memorial in the foreground

- Location within Somerset
- 51.140009°N 3.165500°W
- Location: Over Stowey, Somerset, England

History
- Built: 14th century

Listed Building – Grade II*
- Official name: Church Of St Peter And St Paul
- Designated: 29 March 1963
- Reference no.: 1060177

Church Of St Peter And St Paul in Over Stowey, Somerset, England, is the Anglican parish church for the ancient parish of Over Stowey, now part of the Quantock Villages Benefice in the Diocese of Bath and Wells.

The tower and part of the nave date from the 14th century. There is also 15th century work but the building was heavily restored and enlarged by Richard Carver (architect) in the 19th century. There are some fine carved oak bench ends typical of the area and an unusual monument to the brothers Rich (died 1813 and 1815) depicting agricultural implements and a beehive. Several windows are by Morris & Co including two which are designed by Edward Burne-Jones. One depicts the Angel of the Resurrection and the other a band of angelic musicians. Two of the six bells in the tower are medieval, from Exeter and one dated 1714.

Many of the monuments inside and outside the church are to members of the Labouchere and later Stanley family who built and occupied Quantock Lodge, owned much of the parish and funded the church restoration. A large granite cross in the churchyard is a memorial to Henry Stanley, cricketer and heir to the Quantock Lodge Estate who was killed in the Boer War.

The diarist William Holland was the vicar of Over Stowey from 1779 until his death in 1819.

In 2000 the church was featured on the Royal Mail's First Class Christmas Stamp

== See also ==
- List of ecclesiastical parishes in the Diocese of Bath and Wells
