= Oswestry (disambiguation) =

Oswestry may refer to:

- Oswestry
- Borough of Oswestry
- Oswestry railway station
- Oswestry Cricket Club
- Oswestry Rural
- Oswestry School
- Oswestry Town F.C.
- Oswestry (UK Parliament constituency)
- Oswestry Uplands
- Old Oswestry
