= Alfoxton House =

Historic house in Holford, Somerset, England

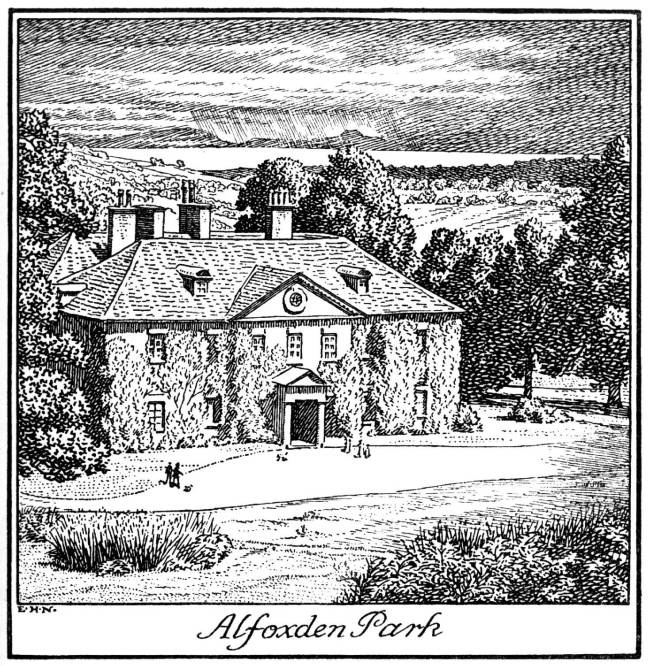
- Alfoxden Park (a 1920 book illustration)

- Location within Somerset

General information
- Location: Holford, England
- Coordinates: 51.1652°N 3.2201°W
- Completed: 1710
- Client: John St Albyn

Alfoxton House, also known as Alfoxton Park or Alfoxden, is an 18th-century country house in Holford, Somerset, England, within the Quantock Hills Area of Outstanding Natural Beauty. The present house was rebuilt in 1710 after the previous building was destroyed in a fire.

== History ==
The poet William Wordsworth and his sister Dorothy lived at Alfoxton House between July 1797 and June 1798, during the time of their friendship with Samuel Taylor Coleridge. Dorothy began her journals here in January 1798 but discontinued them 2 months later to recommence when the couple moved to the Lake District. These were posthumously published as The Alfoxden Journal, 1798 and The Grasmere Journals, 1800-1803.

The building was refenestrated and re-roofed in the 19th century. It has been designated by English Heritage as a Grade II listed building. During World War II it housed evacuees from Wellington House Preparatory School at Westgate-on-Sea in Kent. After use as a country hotel followed by a period of disuse, the house was sold in January 2018. It was again for sale (with 50 acres) in July 2018, and in 2020 purchased for about £2 million by the Alfoxton Park Trust for use by the Triratna Buddhist Community.

== Building ==
Alfoxton House was built in the 18th century of rendered rubble stone, the main block being on a double-pile plan, i.e. two main rooms on each side of a central corridor. The house is two storeys high, with an attic that includes dormer windows. The frontage includes a central porch with columns, frieze and cornice in a Doric style. There is an extension to the left, originally an orangery, with a steep roof over a verandah. The wall includes the coat of arms of the St Albyn family who owned the house for many years.
