= Ashford Reservoir =

Reservoir in Somerset, England

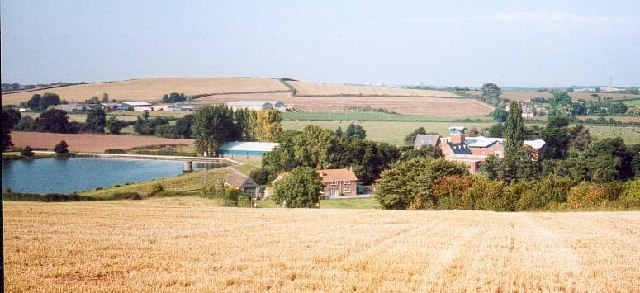

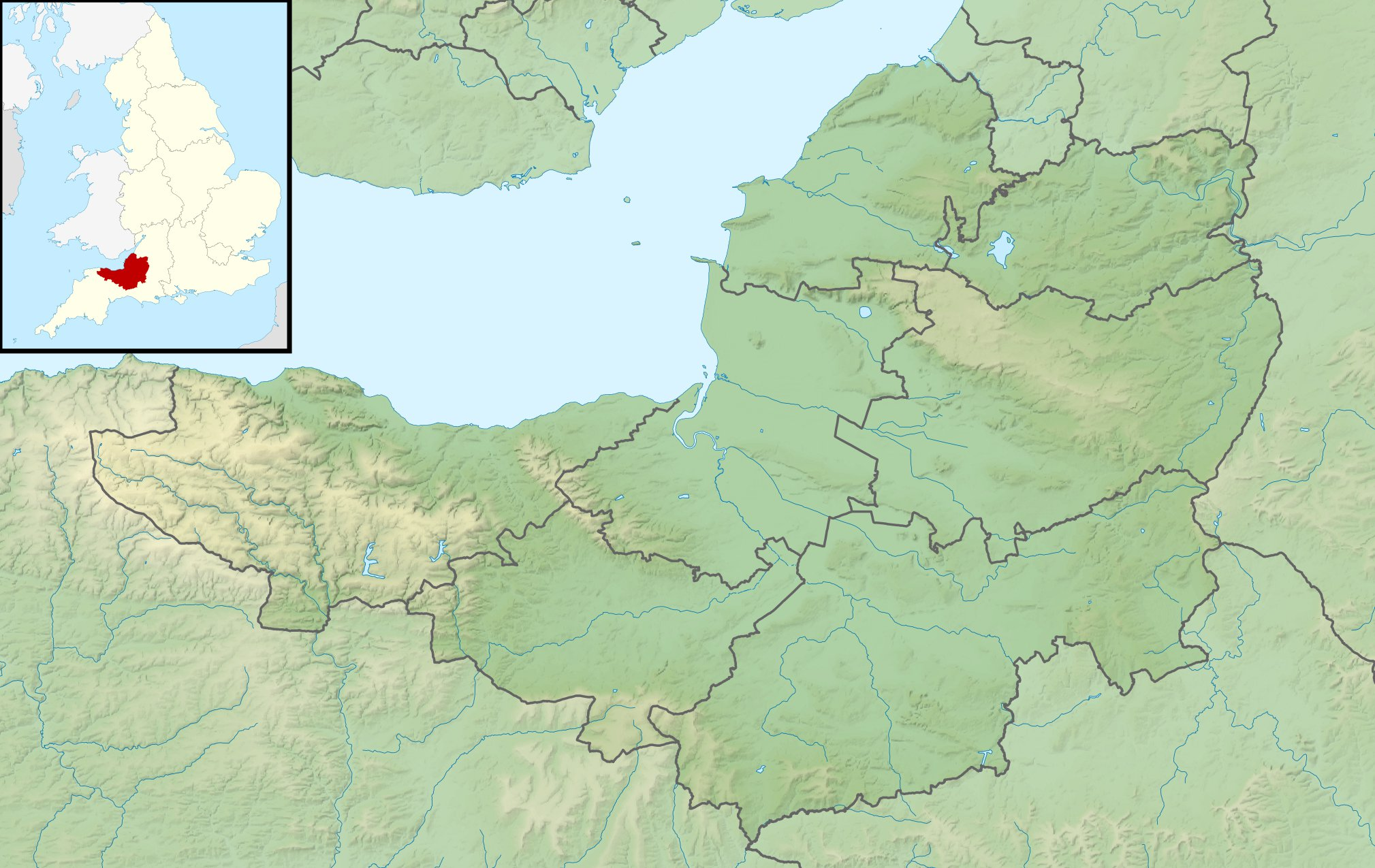
- Location within Somerset
- Location: Somerset
- Coordinates: 51°8′22″N 3°5′45″W
- Type: reservoir
- Basin countries: United Kingdom

Ashford Reservoir is a small reservoir on the eastern side of the Quantock Hills near the villages of Charlynch and Spaxton in Somerset, England. It was constructed 1934 as a water supply reservoir for Bridgwater.

Originally the reservoir was contained by a small embankment dam. In 2009 the banks were removed and replaced by a concrete wall that could contain 45,000,000 litres (9,900,000 imp gal; 12,000,000 US gal) of water. The reservoir collects the water of Peart Water which is also dammed at Hawkridge Reservoir. Below the reservoir the Peart Water joins the Currypool stream to form the Cannington Brook. Fishing is allowed and catches include; Bream, Perch and Roach. The water treatment centre provides educational opportunities.
