= Hawkridge Reservoir =

Reservoir in Somerset, England

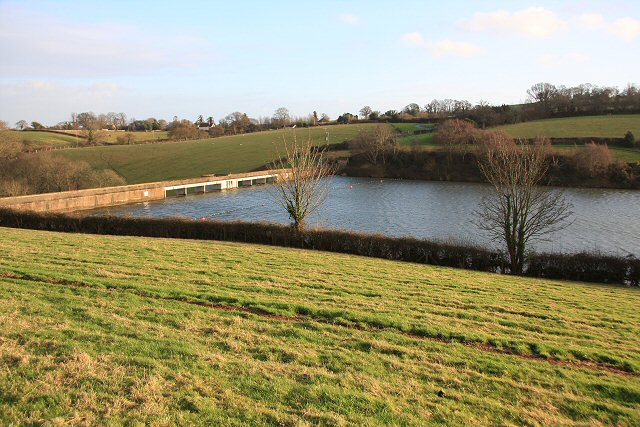

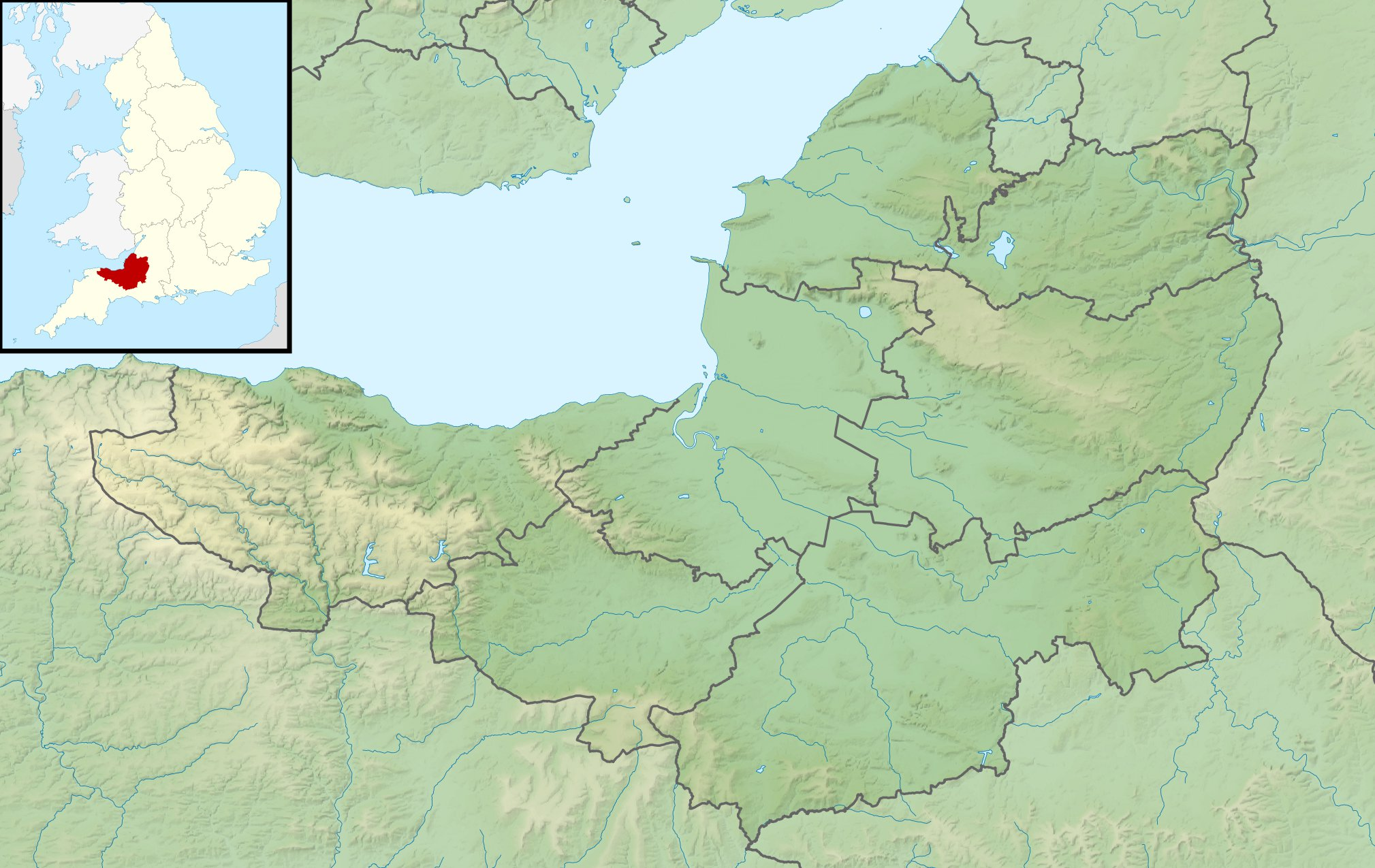
- Location within Somerset
- Location: Spaxton, Somerset, England
- Coordinates: 51°07′09″N 3°08′02″W
- Primary inflows: Peart Water
- Primary outflows: Cannington Brook
- Built: 1960
- First flooded: 1962
- Surface area: 32 acres (13 ha)
- Water volume: 864 million litres (700 acre⋅ft)

Hawkridge Reservoir is a reservoir near Spaxton, Somerset, England.

The inflow is from several streams in the Quantock Hills Area of Outstanding Natural Beauty including Peart Water, which continues below the reservoir in a northeast direction to Spaxton, where it enters the Ashford Reservoir. The distance between the two reservoirs is about 2 miles (3.2 km). The Hawkridge Reservoir was built between 1960 and 1962, to provide drinking water for Bridgwater which is 7 miles (11 km) to the east. It has an area of 32 acres (13 ha) and can hold up to 864 million litres of water. The 161 metres (528 ft) long dam is 24 metres (79 ft) wide and 27 metres (89 ft) high. 30,000 cubic meters of concrete was used in its construction.

Since opening the reservoir has become home to a range of animals including; invertebrates, wildfowl and amphibians. It is used for angling with catches including Rainbow Trout.
