= Cannington Brook =

Stream in Somerset, England

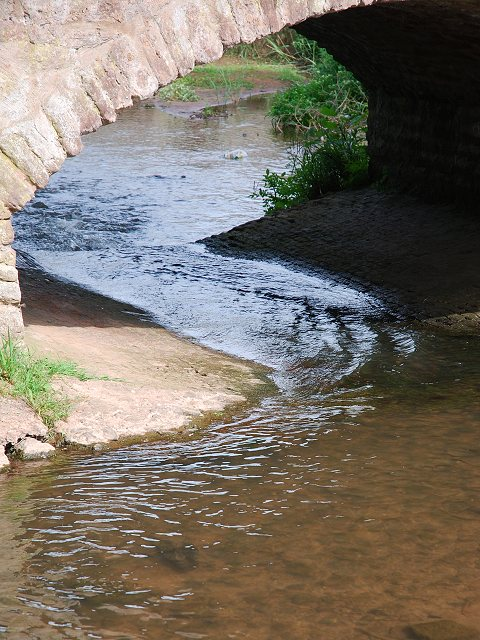
- Cannington Brook flowing under a bridge

Location
- Country: England
- State: Somerset

Physical characteristics
- Source: Hawkridge Reservoir
  - location: Spaxton, Somerset, England
  - coordinates: 51°07′09″N 3°08′02″W
- Mouth: River Parrett
  - location: Combwich, Somerset, England
  - coordinates: 51°09′45″N 3°02′04″W

Cannington brook is a stream in Somerset, England that originates in the Quantock Hills, which is designated an Area of Outstanding Natural Beauty.

Various streams, including Peart Water, flow into Hawkridge Reservoir near Spaxton, which was built between 1960 and 1962, to provide drinking water for Bridgwater. The Peart Water continues in a northeast direction to the Ashford Reservoir which was constructed in 1934. Below the Ashford Reservoir the Peart Water joins the Currypool Stream to form the Cannington brook.

The brook discharges into the River Parrett, south east of Combwich.
