= Holford =

Village in Somerset, England

Coordinates: 51.1638°N 3.2085°W

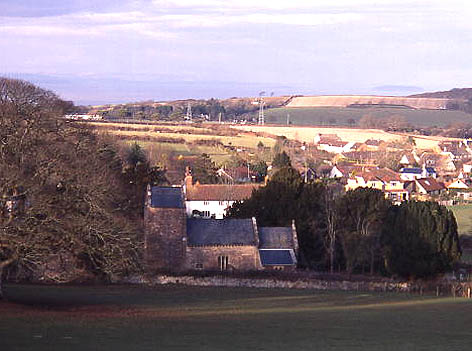
- A view of Holford

- Location within Somerset
- Population: 392 (2011)
- OS grid reference: ST155412
- Unitary authority: Somerset Council
- Ceremonial county: Somerset
- Region: South West
- Country: England
- Sovereign state: United Kingdom
- Post town: BRIDGWATER
- Postcode district: TA5
- Dialling code: 01278
- Police: Avon and Somerset
- Fire: Devon and Somerset
- Ambulance: South Western
- UK Parliament: Tiverton and Minehead

Holford is a village and civil parish in Somerset within the Quantock Hills Area of Outstanding Natural Beauty. It is located about 10 miles (16 km) west of Bridgwater and 6 miles (10 km) east of Williton, with a population of 392. The village is on the Quantock Greenway and Coleridge Way footpaths. The parish includes the village of Dodington.

The River Holford, which runs through the village, flows to the sea at Kilve.

== History ==
The parish of Holford was part of the Whitley Hundred. Holford Glen was once the site of a Huguenot silk factory.

The tannery was built by James Hayman, in the 16th century and is now a hotel. The waterwheel which powered the tannery is still present.

Alfoxton House was built in the 18th century and occupied by the poet William Wordsworth and his sister Dorothy, between July 1797 and June 1798, during the time of their friendship with Samuel Taylor Coleridge.

=== Dodington ===
Dodington was an ancient parish, within the Williton and Freemanners Hundred.

The 15th century Dodington Hall manor house contains the mechanism of a water driven spit in the cellar below the kitchen, and also has heraldic glass dating back to 1485 in parlour wing.

Dodington was the site of the Buckingham Mine where copper was extracted. The mine was established before 1725 and followed earlier exploration at Perry Hill, East Quantoxhead. It was financed by the Marquis of Buckingham until 1801 when it was closed, until various attempts were made to reopen it during the 19th century. The remaining engine house is now a listed building.

Dodington became a civil parish in 1866, but in 1933 the civil parish was abolished and absorbed into the civil parish of Holford.

== Governance ==
The parish council has responsibility for local issues, including setting an annual precept (local rate) to cover the council's operating costs and producing annual accounts for public scrutiny. The parish council evaluates local planning applications and works with the local police, district council officers, and neighbourhood watch groups on matters of crime, security, and traffic. The parish council's role also includes initiating projects for the maintenance and repair of parish facilities, as well as consulting with the district council on the maintenance, repair, and improvement of highways, drainage, footpaths, public transport, and street cleaning. Conservation matters (including trees and listed buildings) and environmental issues are also the responsibility of the council.

For local government purposes, since 1 April 2023, the parish comes under the unitary authority of Somerset Council. Prior to this, it was part of the non-metropolitan district of Somerset West and Taunton (formed on 1 April 2019) and, before this, the district of West Somerset (established under the Local Government Act 1972). It was part of Williton Rural District before 1974.

It is also part of the Tiverton and Minehead county constituency represented in the House of Commons of the Parliament of the United Kingdom. It elects one Member of Parliament (MP) by the first past the post system of election.

== Sites of Special Scientific Interest ==
Holford Kelting, just north of the village, is a 5.3 hectares (13 acres) nature reserve run by the Somerset Wildlife Trust and is part of the Quantock Hills Site of Special Scientific Interest (SSSI). The Ge-mare Farm Fields SSSI consists of an unimproved species-rich flood pasture community with interest enhanced by the presence of a wetter area supporting a lowland mire community. These habitats are rare both nationally and within the county of Somerset.

== Religious sites ==
The parish church of St Mary the Virgin was built in the 19th century on the site of an earlier church going back to the 12th century. It has been designated by English Heritage as a Grade II listed building.

All Saints Church in Dodington was rebuilt and enlarged in the 15th century. It has been designated by English Heritage as a grade I listed building. Dodington Hall was built in the 15th century and enlarged and refenestrated in 1581. It was the home of Sir Francis Dodington who fought for the king during the English Civil War.

== Cultural references ==
The video to Bryan Adams' hit song "(Everything I Do) I Do It for You" was filmed in a forest with a derelict silk mill in Holford Glen.

== Notable people ==
- George Dodington (1662–1720), Whig politician
- George Dodington, 1st Baron Melcombe, politician and nobleman
- Frederic Norton (1869–1946), British composer
- John Cornish White (known as "Farmer" or "Jack") (1891–1961), English cricketer
- Lieutenant-General Noel Irwin, British Army officer
