= James Watson Corder =

English historian

James Watson Corder (1867–1953) is a historian best remembered for documenting family history in Sunderland, County Durham, England. His volumes are invaluable to people interested in genealogy today.

== Early life ==
James Corder, the son of Sunderland merchant tradesman Francis Corder, was educated at the Quaker-run Bootham School in York and never married. Instead, he devoted his life to local history.

His historical studies began when he was in his early 20s, after he was inspired by George Bain, a founder of Sunderland Antiquarian Society, to investigate Sunderland’s history.

== Corder's research ==
James Corder started his research at the end of the 19th century, by copying the registers of three ancient churches, including St Peter's, which was founded by Benedict Biscop. He also used information held by Presbyterian chapels in the town, as well as trade directories and marriage licence bonds.

Corder documented his research in 25 volumes of manuscript books, taking 40 years to compile lists of the births, deaths and marriages of Sunderland families. His knowledge of intermarriage was immense, as documented in his volume on local Quaker families. He also interviewed people to help with the construction of the pedigrees of local families. He made notes of their origins in his manuscripts and traced their first entry into the town, the trades they were in and where they lived.

But he was also controversial. His books often contained potentially libelous comments on the people he met. One man was called a ‘worthless nonentity,’ by Corder, another ‘a habitual drunkard.’ It is said that his books were kept hidden at Sunderland library for some years, for fear of possible court action by those mentioned.

As well as his family records, Corder also chronicled Sunderland's streets, buildings, churches and industries in a further 36 volumes. Many of the streets, and most of the firms he listed, have now disappeared – hence his work is of great value.

== His final years ==
Corder retired in the 1940s, donating his volumes of research to Sunderland’s Central Library. He left Sunderland some years later, moving to Over Stowey in Somerset. He died in Over Stowey in a nursing home in 1953, at the age of 85.

Corder's record of Sunderland life is available to view at Sunderland’s Central Library.
