= Friends of Quantock =

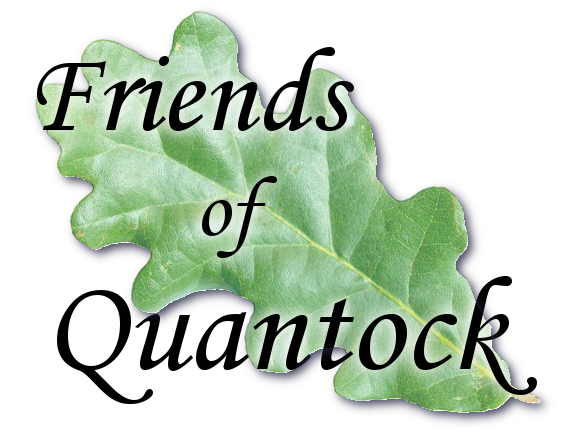
- Founded: 1949
- Type: Charitable Incorporated Organisation
- Headquarters: Somerset, United Kingdom
- Region served: Quantock Hills, Somerset

Friends of Quantock is a Charitable Incorporated Organisation with the object of the “conservation, protection and improvement of the landscape and natural environment of the Quantock Hills”. They are an independent charity, funded and governed by their own membership as “guardians of the Quantock Hills on behalf of the public”.

== The Quantock Hills ==
The Quantock Hills (Somerset)

The Quantock Hills is an area of Somerset in the UK, a designated Area of Outstanding Natural Beauty (AONB), much of it also Site of Special Scientific Interest (SSSI) of great natural beauty, historical, literary and scientific importance, a haven for wildlife and rare species containing upland heath, forest and coastline open for public access.

== History ==
Friends of Quantock was first formed in 1949 in response to proposals to fell ancient woodland in Hodders Combe and to turn over a large area of heathland to commercial conifer plantation. The first president was the Bishop of Bath and Wells. After gathering public support to successfully defeat those proposals The Friends of Quantock subsequently campaigned for proper management and protection of the Hills leading to the Quantocks becoming an AONB in 1956 and to the setting up of the Quantock Hills Joint Advisory Committee in 1973.

They opposed plans to build an 18 hole Golf Course on top of the hills in the 1970s.

In 2013 they acquired two tracts of land from Somerset County Council and were incorporated as a CIO.

== Activities ==
Over the years Friends of Quantock has commissioned reports and surveys of Quantock plants and wildlife, made grants for restoration projects of landscape features, published books and leaflets, commented on planning applications and served on the Joint Advisory Committee. They have campaigned over litter, vehicle use, deer poaching, quarries, overhead power lines, and public rights of way.

== Land acquisition ==
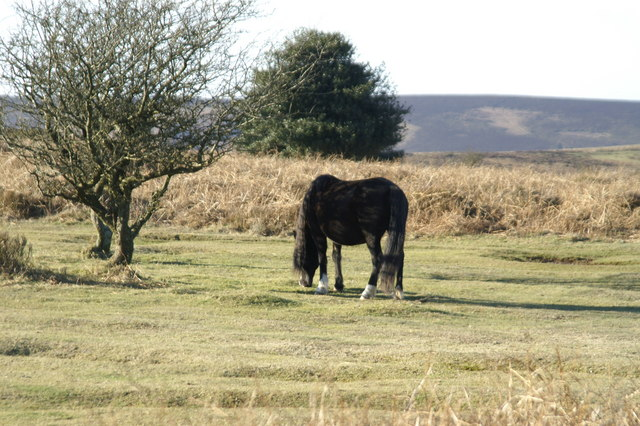
Pony on Quantocks

In 2012 Somerset County Council declared their land holdings on the Quantocks to be 'Surplus' and announced their intention to sell them. Friends of Quantock opposed in principle the transfer of Quantock land out of public ownership but was successful in negotiating the acquisition of 400 acres (160 ha) of heathland and forest under a Community Asset Transfer Scheme for the sum of £2. Over Stowey Customs Common and Thorncombe Hill are therefore owned and held by Friends of Quantock for the benefit of the public. As a result of this purchase the Charity was dissolved and reincorporated as a Charitable Incorporated Organisation to protect its trustees from the liabilities of property ownership.

== See also ==
- Quantock Hills
- Area of Outstanding Natural Beauty
