= Cockercombe tuff =

Pyroclastic rock

Coordinates: 51.09°N 3.20°W

Cockercombe Tuff is a greenish-grey, hard pyroclastic rock, formed by the compression of volcanic ash containing high quantities of chlorite, which gives it its distinctive colour. It is found almost exclusively in the south-eastern end of the Quantock Hills near Cockercombe, Somerset, England, from where it has been quarried for centuries.

Quantock Lodge is built from Cockercombe tuff.
