= Oswestry Uplands =

Coordinates: 52.87°N 3.09°W

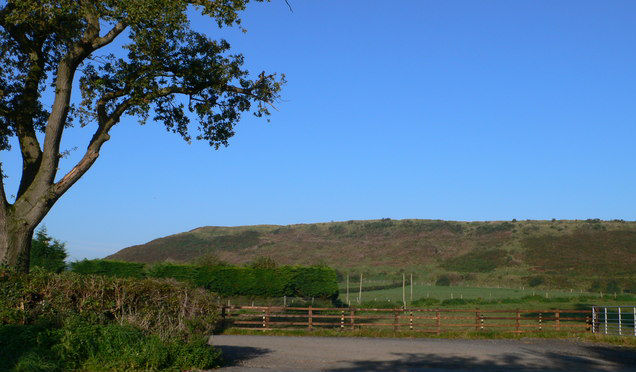
Old Oswestry hill fort

The Oswestry Uplands are a small natural region in the English county of Shropshire on the border with Wales.

The Oswestry Uplands have been designated as Natural Area No. 41 and National Character Area No. 63 by Natural England and its predecessor bodies. The area is much more closely linked by culture and language to Wales than other parts of Shropshire. The Uplands are characterized by an undulating landscape of Carboniferous Limestone hills with calcareous grasslands and rocky outcrops with steep wooded valleys; marshes and fens occupying the valley bottoms.

The Uplands have a total area of 9,981 hectares and occupy a salient running from Pant to Chirk on the Anglo-Welsh border which takes in the town of Oswestry and village of Gobowen. The highest elevations lie on the western boundary of the NCA bordering the Berwyn Hills of Wales and the highest point is on Selattyn Hill (372 metres (1,220 ft)).
