= William Holland (diarist) =

English clergyman and diarist (1746–1819)

Coordinates: 51.13991°N 3.16540°W

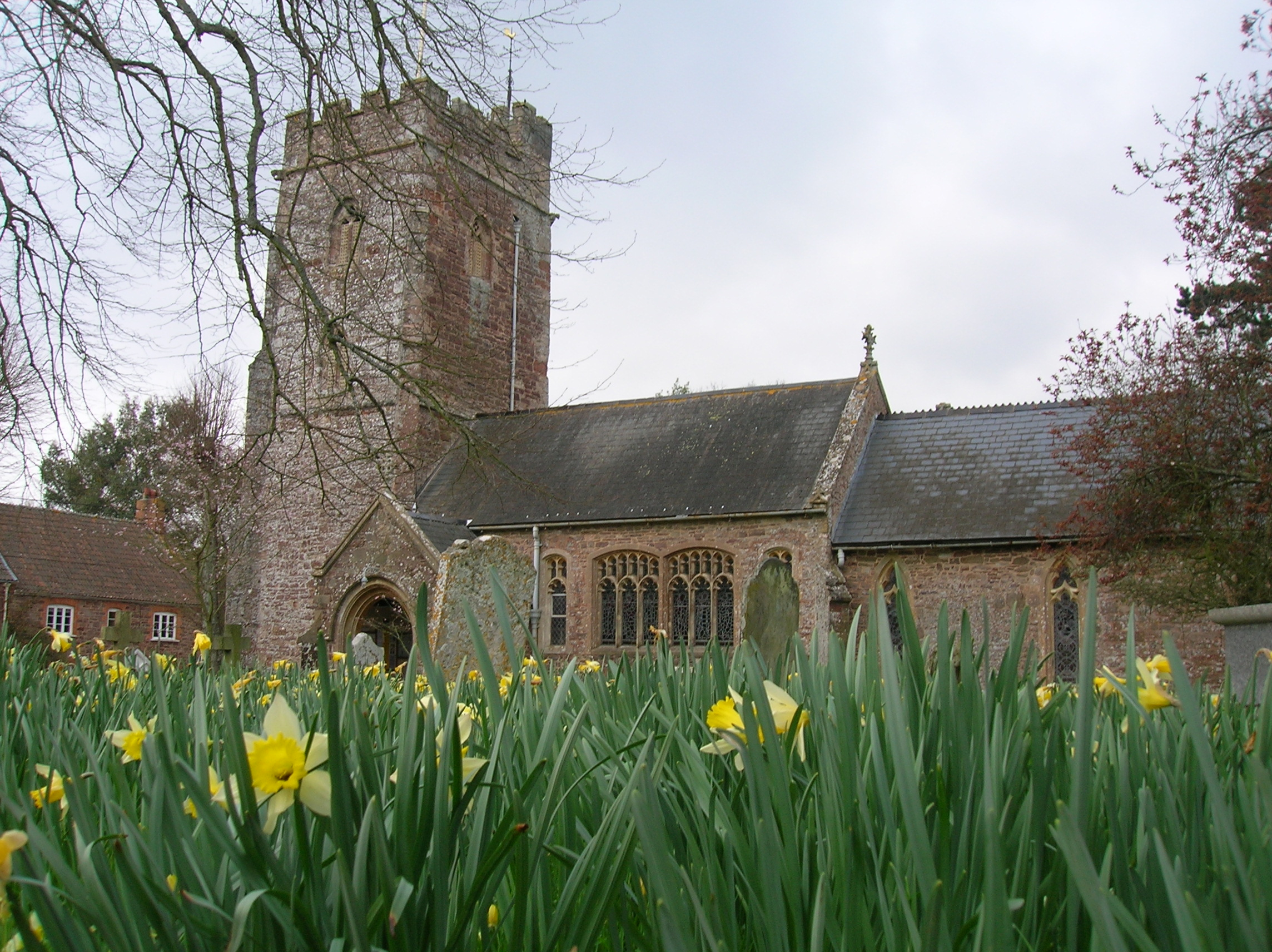
Rev. Holland's Church of St Peter and St Paul, Over Stowey

William Holland (9 May 1746 – 17 April 1819) is now best remembered for his diary, which he kept from 1799 to 1818.

== Diary ==
The diary chronicles his life as the vicar of Over Stowey, Somerset. In a similar fashion to the diary of Thomas Turner, Holland's diary is a personal consideration of the workings of country life during a time of considerable national tension. The diary is broad in scope, with limited discussion of national events such as the Napoleonic Wars occurring alongside treatment of local matters. Not all of the diary's original 99 volumes survive; particularly, entries written both before and after the current known time-span of the diary are thought to have existed.

== Publication ==
Extracts from Holland's diary were published by C.F. Johnston in 1984. In 2003, the book Paupers & Pig Killers: The Diary of William Holland, ed. Jack Ayres, was published by Sutton Publishing. Comic excerpts were dramatized by BBC Radio in 2008–2012.
