= Devon Redlands =

Natural region in southwest England

Coordinates: 50.8°N 3.4°W

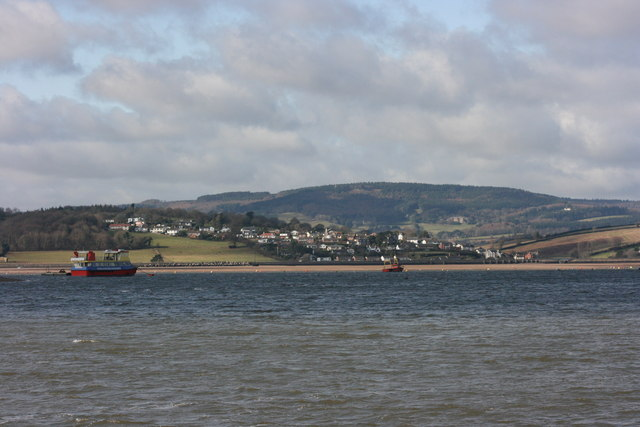
Cockwood and the Haldon Hills from the River Exe

The Devon Redlands is a natural region in southwest Britain that has been designated as National Character Area (NCA) 148 by Natural England.

== Extent ==
The boundary of the Devon Redlands NCA runs along the south Devon coast from Torquay to Otterton before heading almost due north to Burlescombe, then turning northwest to Clayhanger and Shillingford. From Shillingford it runs initially southwest and then south, taking in Bampton, Cove, Loxbeare and Withleigh. South of the A3072 it swings due west in a long finger that extends beyond Bow, but returns via Yeoford and Newton St Cyres before swinging west of Exeter and heading roughly southwards again through Newton Abbot to Torquay.

Neighbouring NCAs are (clockwise from the southwest): South Devon, Dartmoor, The Culm, Exmoor, the Vale of Taunton and Quantock Fringes, the Blackdowns, the Yeovil Scarplands and the Marshwood and Powerstock Vales.

== Character ==
The Devon Redlands have a very strong, unified character, readily visible in the colouration of its ploughed fields, cliffs and outcrops, as well as the building material of its traditional stone and cob farmsteads, hamlets and villages. This colouration is derived from the red sandstone that underlies the area and produces the rich red soils that make the Redlands the agricultural heart of the county of Devon. It is a region of gently rolling hills, with sunken lanes and high hedgerows enclosing smallish fields utilized both for grazing and crops. Rivers are important landscape features; their valleys are flat-bottomed and open up into extensive flood plains in the low-lying terrain of the central Redlands, dominated especially by the estuary of the River Exe south of the city of Exeter. Around this heartland, the land rises towards the edge of the west, north and east of the region. In the south, the coastal strip borders on the English Channel and has achieved partial World Heritage status.
