= Mid Somerset Hills =

Coordinates: 51.05°N 2.74°W

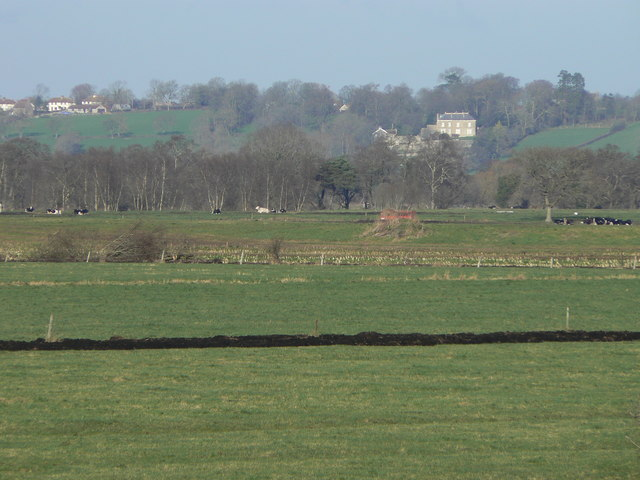
The Isle of Wedmore

The Mid Somerset Hills are a major natural region in the county of Somerset in southwest west England, forming a series of low hills and ridges that divide up the Somerset Levels.

The region is listed as National Character Area 143 by Natural England, the UK government's advisor on the natural environment. Its irregularly shaped area covers 42,092 hectares (162.52 sq mi) and runs from Staple Fitzpaine and Ashill in the southwest to just south of Wells and Shepton Mallet in the northeast. The towns of Glastonbury and Street lie partly within this region. To the west are the Somerset Levels and Moors, the Vale of Taunton and Quantock Fringes, to the north the Mendips rise steeply from the flat landscape, to the east and south are the Yeovil Scarplands and to the southwest are the Blackdown Hills.

The Mid Somerset Hills send four fingers of higher land into the Levels. The northernmost finger, between the rivers Axe and Brue, ends in the Isle of Wedmore, the next only extends as far as Glastonbury, the third ridge – the Polden Hills – reaches nearly as far as Bridgwater, while the southernmost "thumb" surrounds Somerton. A further area of hills is centred on Curry Mallet and is drained by the rivers Tone and Isle.
