= Quantock Greenway =

Footpath in Somerset, England

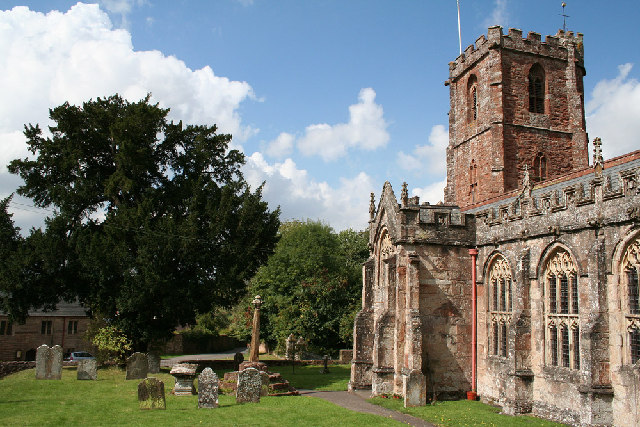
- Crowcombe Church
- Length: 37 mi (60 km)
- Location: Quantock Hills, Somerset, England
- Trailheads: Triscombe
- Use: Hiking

The Quantock Greenway is a footpath in the Quantock Hills in Somerset, England, which opened in 2001.

The route of the path follows a figure of 8 centred on Triscombe, the northern loop taking in Crowcombe and Holford is 19 miles (31 km), the southern loop to Broomfield is 18 miles (29 km). It travels through many different types of landscape, including deciduous and coniferous woodland, private parkland, grazed pasture and cropped fields.

== See also ==
- Long-distance footpaths in the UK
