= Quantock Lodge =

English country house in Over Stowey, Somerset, England

Coordinates: 51°7′56″N 3°9′51″W

Quantock Lodge is a grade II listed nineteenth-century Gothic Revival mansion built by Henry Labouchere, 1st Baron Taunton (1798–1869), to the design of Henry Clutton. It is built from Cockercombe tuff and is located near Aley in the parish of Over Stowey in Somerset. It has variously been used as an estate, a sanatorium and a school.

== History ==
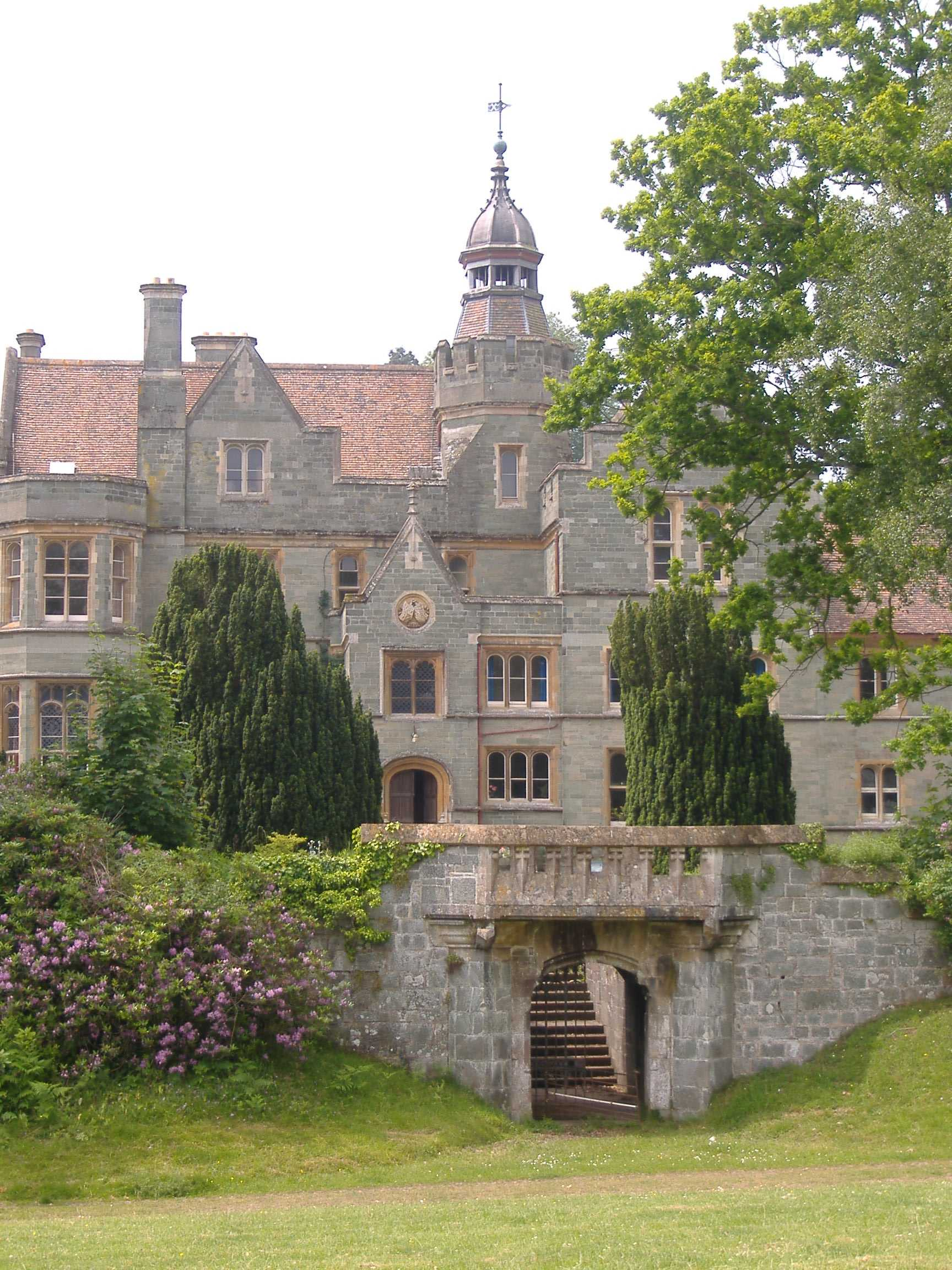
Quantock Lodge

=== The Estate ===
In 1833, Lord Taunton purchased the estates of Over Stowey from the Earl of Egmont, and added the estates of Nether Stowey in 1838, forming the estate of 'Over and Nether Stowey' or just the 'Quantock' estate, named after the nearby Quantock Hills.

Lord Taunton was then the MP for nearby Taunton, and had been born in Over Stowey; he was later to become President of the Board of Trade, Chief Secretary for Ireland and Secretary of State for the Colonies, before his resignation from the House of Commons and his ennoblement as Baron Taunton in 1859.

=== The house ===
In 1857 Lord Taunton engaged Henry Clutton to construct a house for the estate, as a summer residence (Lord Taunton's primary residence was in Belgrave Square, where he died) and to house Lady Taunton's extensive art collection. This required the demolition of the hamlet of Aley Green, and was built in stages in the 1860s, and ultimately came to comprise the main house, stable-block, gatehouse and lodges.

The main house has been described, perhaps unkindly, by Sir Nikolaus Pevsner as "a large rather dull Tudor house... Gothic Stables, a specially crazy Gothic Dovecote and a big Gothic Lodge on the Aisholt Road"; it comprised a library, great hall, billiards room and several other major rooms. The Cockercombe tuff necessary for construction was quarried on site.

In 1869 on the death of Lord Taunton the house and estate passed to his eldest daughter, the Hon. Mary Labouchere, who married Edward Stanley (1826–1907) in 1872. Edward Stanley became an MP for West Somerset at a by-election in 1882, and represented the seat, and its successor, as a Conservative until 1906, making three contributions in parliamentary debates, typically on local issues.

Edward Stanley had two sons, Henry Thomas Stanley and Edward Arthur Vesey Stanley. Henry was the elder and expected to inherit the estate. Henry was a keen cricketer, representing Somerset County Cricket Club in fifty first-class matches between 1894 and 1899. He had joined the West Somerset Yeomanry as an officer, but died in 1900 during the Second Boer War. As a memorial, Edward Stanley planted trees in the house's grounds in the formation of a cricketing eleven.

After Henry's death, Edward Arthur Vesey Stanley, for whom the Quantock Staghounds had been founded in 1902, became heir and inherited the 8,000 acre estate after his father's death in 1907. In September 1920 the estate, house and contents were sold at auction over eleven days to clear Edward's debts.

The auction brochure can be found here: https://commons.wikimedia.org/wiki/File:Quantock_Lodge_Auction_Brochure_1920.pdf

=== The sanatorium ===
At the 1919 auction, the estate was divided, but the main house was bought by Somerset County Council under the Public Health Act 1913 to become the Quantock Sanatorium, along with 2,045 acres. The sanatorium lasted until 1961, when the rise of antibiotics rendered such treatment ineffectual.

=== The school ===
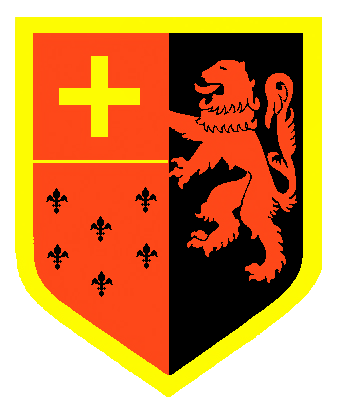
Quantock School Crest

In the 1962 the house was purchased by David T. Peaster and made into a school in 1964, which he initially headed alongside Cotham School, Bristol, before the latter closed in 1966. The school preserved various traditions of the house, preserving Lord Taunton's arms as the school's crest, and adopting the phrase passibus citis sed novis as their motto.

The school was run on traditional lines, and proved especially popular with diplomats and armed services personnel, not least since it was in the exclusive list of schools recommended by the Ministry of Defence. Within a few years of opening, it was described by the Gordonstoun Record as 'the Gordonstoun of the West' and the Daily Express termed it 'Britain's newest Public School'.

The estate was gradually developed for educational purposes in this period, with the Patio Block and Sports Hall Block being constructed in the 1970s, and the Stable Block in the following decade. Similarly, to sustain the school's co-curricular activities, an all-weather pitch, tennis court and new heated swimming pool complex were built in the 1980s.

In 1986 Quantock School became co-educational, but soon after the turn of the 1990s was in gradual decline, due in the main to the end of the Cold War and the subsequent closure of a number of overseas service bases, which in turn led to a drying up of new pupils. The hand-over of Hong Kong to China in 1997 also had a serious impact on the school population. A withering report from Service Children's Education in 1996 and later Ofsted on low quality teaching, poorly educated students, and numerous other failings at Quantock School in 1997 led to it being removed from the Service Children's Education list of approved schools, the school thus collapsed as parents withdrew their children, and was finally forced to close in 1999.

=== Present-day ===
Following the death of David Peaster in 2000, the school reverted to its former name of Quantock Lodge, and was re-marketed by Peaster's widow, Jane, as a centre for recreation and banqueting. It was also a youth summer camp centre, as of 2024 accommodation is no longer provided at the centre but the gym and swimming pool remain open on a daily basis.

The house and considerable grounds around it was put up for sale in the early 2020s with the price being eventually reduced to £2,500,000 GBP. As of September 2026 the property remains on the market.

== Gallery ==
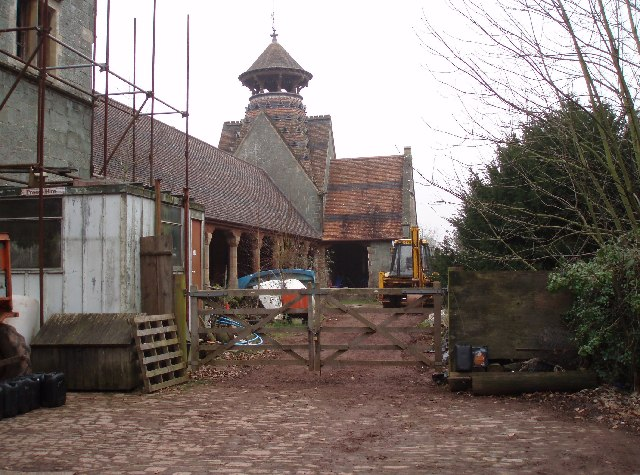
Dovecote

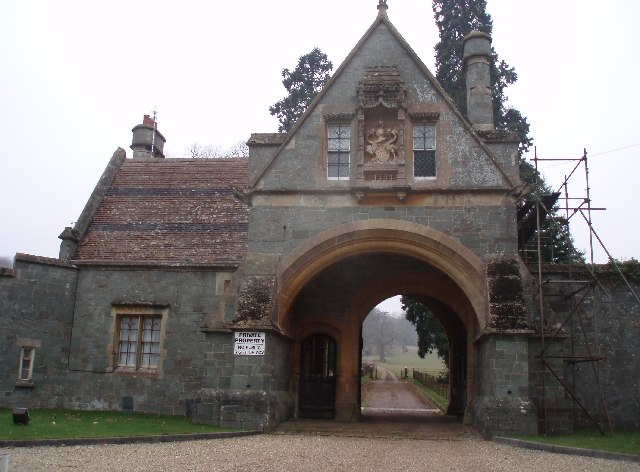
Gatehouse
