= Vale of Taunton and Quantock Fringes =

Natural region of Somerset, England

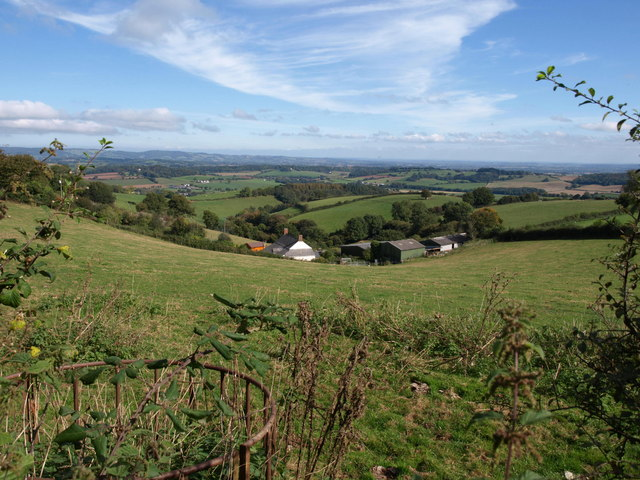
The Vale of Taunton

The Vale of Taunton and Quantock Fringes form a natural region in the southwest of England in the county of Somerset. Natural England have designated the Vale of Taunton and Quantock Fringes as National Character Area 146.

== Extent ==
The region covers 48,403 hectares (119,610 acres) and entirely surrounds the northwest–southeast oriented line of the Quantock Hills which form National Character Area 144. The Vale of Taunton runs from the foot of the steep northern scarp of the Blackdown Hills to the coast of the Bristol Channel. In the west it extends between the Quantock Hills and the Brendon Hills on the eastern edge of Exmoor and, to the east, between the Quantock Hills and the Somerset Levels and Moors. Much of the region is verdant and pastoral, transitioning to steep, moorland-topped hills in the west and open clay levels in the east.

Neighbouring natural regions are: Exmoor to the west, the Devon Redlands to the southwest, the Blackdowns to the south, the Mid Somerset Hills to the southeast and the Somerset Levels and Moors to the east.

== Character ==
The region is a lowland area with a mixed farming landscape, dense hedges, sparse woodland and frequent, scattered settlements. It contrasts sharply with the surrounding uplands. Within the region, there are three distinct areas: the floodplain, the low clay vale and the higher sandstone vale edge. Villages, hamlets and farmsteads are scattered and frequently linked by winding lanes. Cider apple orchards abound, hedgerow oak is plentiful in some areas and there are willows on the floodplains. The coast is open and windswept with low cliffs. Architectural features include red sandstone buildings and prominent Perpendicular church towers.
