= Over Stowey =

Village and civil parish in Somerset, England

Coordinates: 51.152°N 3.154°W

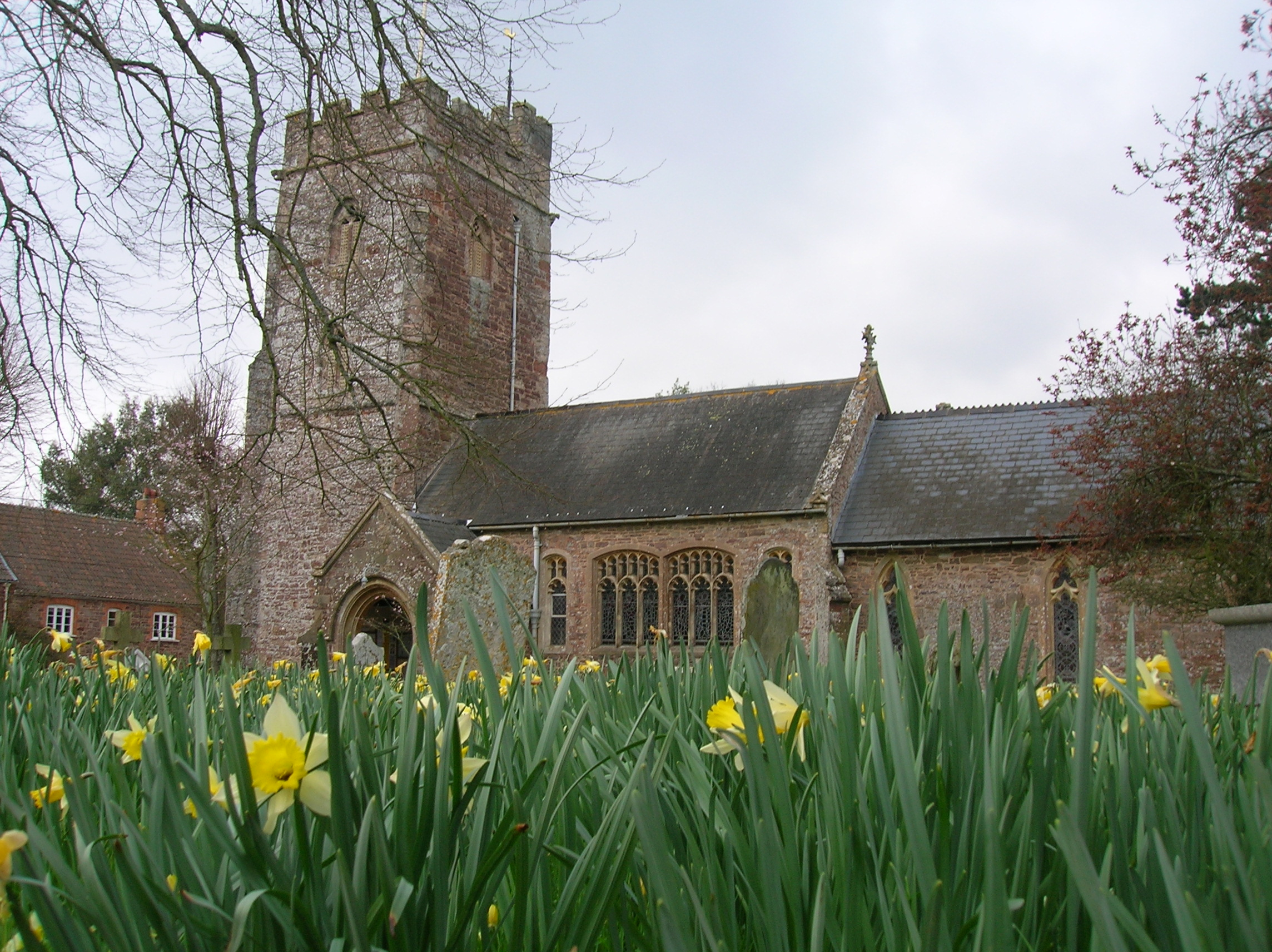
- Church of St Peter and St Paul

- Location within Somerset
- Population: 352 (2011)
- OS grid reference: ST194398
- Unitary authority: Somerset Council
- Ceremonial county: Somerset
- Region: South West
- Country: England
- Sovereign state: United Kingdom
- Post town: BRIDGWATER
- Postcode district: TA5
- Dialling code: 01278
- Police: Avon and Somerset
- Fire: Devon and Somerset
- Ambulance: South Western
- UK Parliament: Bridgwater

Over Stowey is a small village and civil parish in Somerset, South West England. A large part of the forest and open heath of the Quantock Hills is within the parish and it includes the hamlets of Plainsfield, Aley, Adscombe, Friarn and Bincombe. It is adjacent to Nether Stowey, 8 miles (13 km) north-west of Bridgwater.

== History ==
Nearby is Dowsborough Camp (or Danesborough or Dawesbury), an Iron Age hill fort. Another Iron Age site at Plainsfield Camp may have been an enclosure for animals rather than a defended settlement.

It is possible that a Roman road ran from here to the Quantocks, because the names Nether Stowey and Over Stowey come from the Old English stan wey, meaning 'stone way'.

By the 12th century the parish had both a church and the 'old castle precinct' on the Stowey 'herpath'. The castle may have been the caput of the estate of Alfred d'Epaignes at Stowey. It survives as a large, flat mound to the north of Over Stowey village.

Over Stowey was part of the hundred of Cannington.

The village was the site of six fulling mills and was a site for copper mining.

Plainsfield was a centre for weaving and pottery, the manor having been held by the family of Admiral Robert Blake from around 1600.

In the 1830s three-quarters of the land of the parish was bought by Henry Labouchere, 1st Baron Taunton who built Quantock Lodge as his home which later became a school.

== Governance ==
The parish council has responsibility for local issues, including setting an annual precept (local rate) to cover the council's operating costs and producing annual accounts for public scrutiny. The parish council evaluates local planning applications and works with the local police, district council officers, and neighbourhood watch groups on matters of crime, security, and traffic. The parish council's role also includes initiating projects for the maintenance and repair of parish facilities, as well as consulting with the district council on the maintenance, repair, and improvement of highways, drainage, footpaths, public transport, and street cleaning. Conservation matters (including trees and listed buildings) and environmental issues are also the responsibility of the council.

For local government purposes, since 1 April 2023, the village comes under the unitary authority of Somerset Council. Prior to this, it was part of the non-metropolitan district of Sedgemoor, which was formed on 1 April 1974 under the Local Government Act 1972, having previously been part of Bridgwater Rural District.

It is also part of the Bridgwater county constituency represented in the House of Commons of the Parliament of the United Kingdom. It elects one Member of Parliament (MP) by the first past the post system of election.

== Religious sites ==
William Holland kept a diary of his life as the vicar of the Church of St Peter and St Paul in the village from 1799 to 1818. The first recorded incumbent was in 1144. The 14th or 15th-century tower was largely rebuilt by Richard Carver in 1840. It has been designated by English Heritage as a Grade II* listed building.

There was a 13th-century chapel of the Virgin Mary built at Adscome by the monks of Athelney Abbey who had an estate there - Adscombe Chapel.

== Notable residents ==
- Humphrey Blake, Lord of the Manor of West Tuxwell (1500-1558). Blake was buried on 28 December 1558 at St Peter and Paul Church. In the middle passage of the church there is a monumental tablet for Humphrey and his wife Ann. The inscription reads: “Here lyeth the bodye of Humfry Blake of Overstowey clothier deceased, who was buried the 20 day of March Anno Domini 1619 Also Ann, the wife of Humfry Blake, was here interred December ye 11, 1645”.
- James Watson Corder, a historian who died in the village in 1953
- Phyllis Bottome, novelist, lived in the vicarage as a child in the 1890s.
