= Quantock Hills =

Range of hills west of Bridgwater in Somerset, England

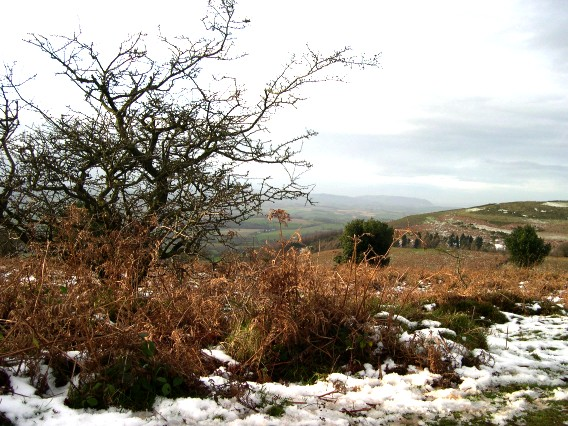
- Upland scrub in the Quantocks

- Location of the Quantock Hills AONB in the UK
- Location: Somerset, England
- Coordinates: 51°08′39″N 3°13′59″W
- Area: 38 sq mi (98 km^{2})
- Governing body: Quantock Hills AONB
- Website: Quantock Hills AONB

The Quantock Hills west of Bridgwater in Somerset, England, consist of heathland, oak woodlands, ancient parklands and agricultural land. They were England's first Area of Outstanding Natural Beauty, designated in 1956, and now termed a National Landscape.

Natural England have designated the Quantock Hills as a national character area. They are entirely surrounded by another: the Vale of Taunton and Quantock Fringes.

The hills run from the Vale of Taunton Deane in the south, for about 15 miles (24 km) to the north-west, ending at Kilve and West Quantoxhead on the coast of the Bristol Channel. They form the western border of Sedgemoor and the Somerset Levels. From the top of the hills on a clear day, it is possible to see Glastonbury Tor and the Mendips to the east, Wales as far as the Gower Peninsula to the north, the Brendon Hills and Exmoor to the west, and the Blackdown Hills to the south. The highest point on the Quantocks is Wills Neck, at 1,261 feet (384 m). Soil types and weather combine to support the hills' plants and animals. In 1970, an area of 6,194.5 acres (2,506.8 ha) was designated as a Biological Site of Special Scientific Interest.

Archaeological landscape features include Bronze Age round barrows, extensive ancient field systems and Iron Age hill forts. Roman silver coins have been discovered in West Bagborough. The hills are popular with walkers, mountain bikers, horse riders and tourists who explore paths such as the Coleridge Way.

== Etymology ==
The name first appears in Saxon charters in around AD 880 as Cantuctun and two centuries later in the Domesday Book of 1086 as Cantoctona and Cantetone. The name means settlement by a rim or circle of hills; Cantuc is Celtic for a rim or circle, and -ton or -tun is Old English for a settlement. The highest point of the hills is called Will's Neck meaning ridge of the Welshman, probably referring to a time when the hills marked the boundary between the expanding Saxon kingdom of Wessex and the lands of the Britons or 'Welsh' to the West. A battle was fought locally at that time.

== Geology ==
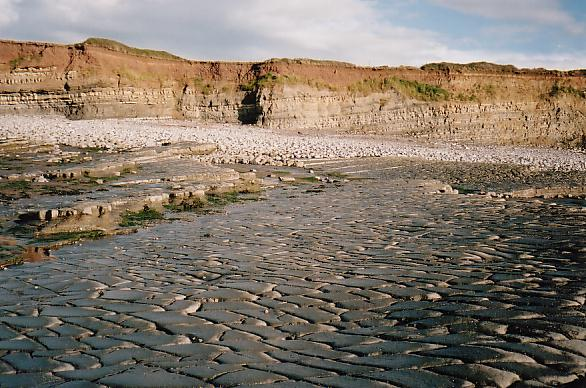
Beach at Quantock's Head. The wave cut platform is visible at low tide below the short "cliff" exposing the rock strata.

The Quantock Hills are largely formed by rocks of the Devonian period, which consist of sediments originally laid down under a shallow sea and slowly compressed into solid rock. In the higher north-western areas older Early Devonian rocks known as Hangman Grits (or, more formally, the Hangman Sandstone Formation) predominate and can be seen in the exposed rock at West Quantoxhead quarry, which was worked for road building. The Hangman Grits are described in three divisions: the lowest are the Little Quantock Beds, which are located near Crowcombe, and made up of siltstones and slates. Between Triscombe and West Quantoxhead is a layer of the Triscombe Beds which is around 500 metres (1,600 ft) thick and is made up of green sandstone and mudstones. The uppermost division is the Hodders Combe Beds of sandstone and conglomerate and is approximately 300 metres (980 ft) thick.

Further south there are newer Middle and Late Devonian rocks, known as Ilfracombe beds and Morte Slates. These include sandstone and limestone, which have been quarried near Aisholt. At Great Holwell, south of Aisholt, is the only limestone cave in the Devonian limestone of North Devon and West Somerset. The lower fringes around the hills are composed of younger New Red Sandstone rocks of the Triassic period. These rocks were laid down in a shallow sea and often contain irregular masses or veins of gypsum, which was mined on the foreshore at Watchet.

Several areas have outcrops of slates. Younger rocks of the Jurassic period can be found between St Audries and Kilve. This area falls within the Blue Anchor to Lilstock Site of Special Scientific Interest (SSSI) and is considered to be of international geological importance.

Kilve has the remains of a red-brick retort built in 1924 after the shale in the cliffs was found to be rich in oil. Along this coast, the cliffs are layered with compressed strata of oil-bearing shale and blue, yellow and brown Lias embedded with fossils. The Shaline Company was founded in 1924 to exploit these strata but was unable to raise sufficient capital. The company's retort house is thought to be the first structure erected here for the conversion of shale to oil and is all that remains of the anticipated Somerset oil boom.

At Blue Anchor the coloured alabaster found in the cliffs gave rise to the name of the colour "Watchet Blue". The village has the only updraught brick kiln known to have survived in Somerset. It was built around 1830 and was supplied by small vessels carrying limestone to the small landing jetty. Now used as a garage, the kiln is thought to have operated until the 1870s, when the large-scale production of bricks in Bridgwater rendered small brickyards uneconomic.

Cockercombe tuff is a greenish-grey, hard pyroclastic rock formed by the compression of volcanic ash and is found almost exclusively in the south-eastern end of the Quantock Hills.

== Climate ==
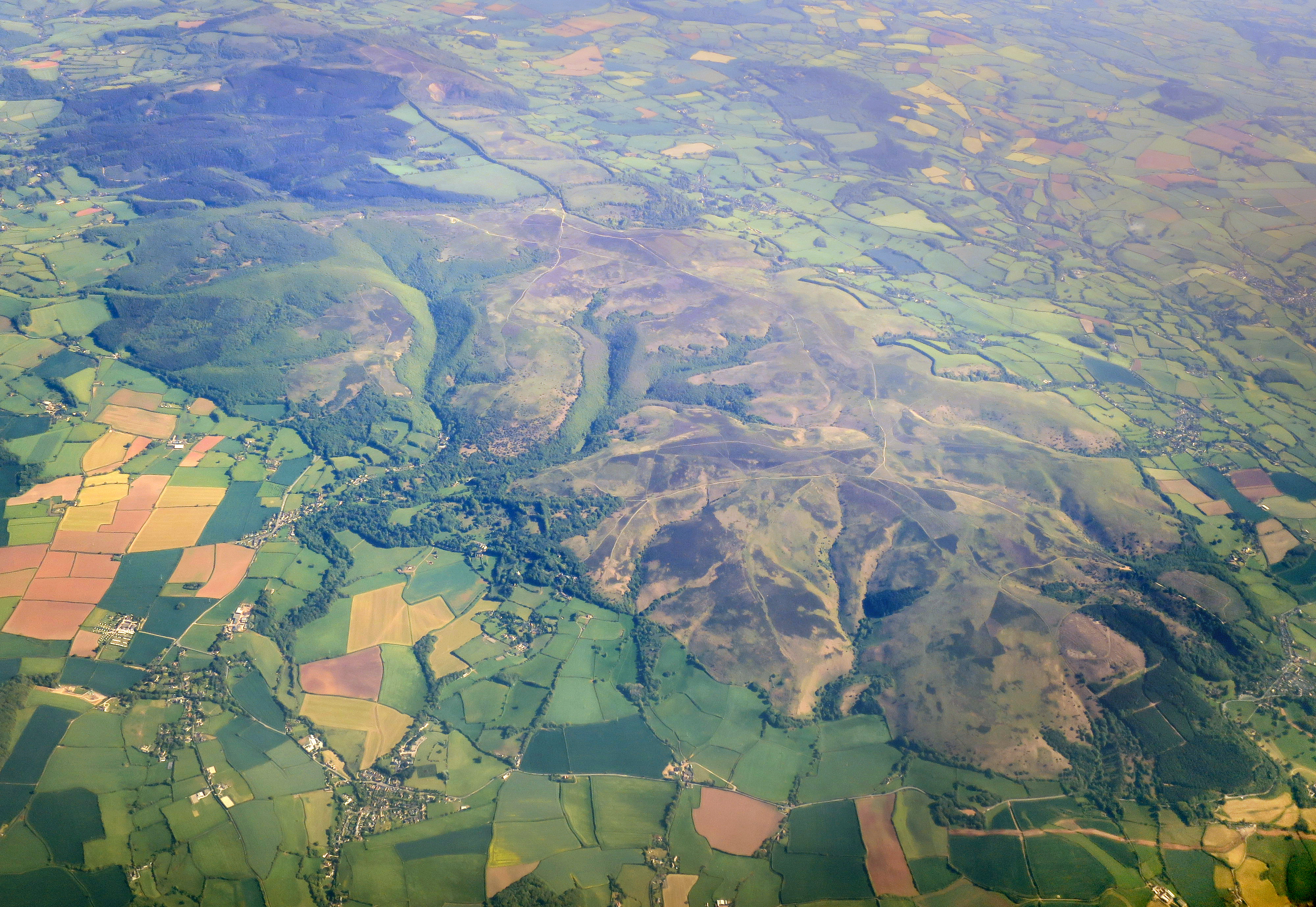
Aerial view of the Quantock Hills

Along with the rest of South West England, the Quantock Hills has a temperate climate that is generally wetter and milder than the rest of England. The mean temperature is approximately 10 °C (50 °F) and shows a seasonal and a diurnal variation, but because of the modifying effect of the sea the range is less than in most other parts of the United Kingdom. January is the coldest month with mean minimum temperatures between 1 °C (34 °F) and 2 °C (36 °F). July and August are the warmest months, with mean daily maxima around 21 °C (70 °F). December is normally the most cloudy month and June the sunniest. High pressure over the Azores often brings clear skies to south-west England, particularly in summer.

Cloud often forms inland especially near hills, and acts to reduce sunshine. The average annual sunshine totals around 1,600 hours. Rainfall tends to be associated with Atlantic depressions or with convection. In summer, convection caused by solar surface heating sometimes forms shower clouds, and a large proportion of rain falls from showers and thunderstorms at this time of year. Average rainfall is around 31 to 35 inches (790 to 890 mm). About 8 to 15 days of snowfall is typical. From November to March, mean wind speeds are highest; winds are lightest from June to August. The predominant wind direction is from the south-west.

== Ecology ==
In 1970 an area of 6,194.5 acres (2,506.8 ha) in the Quantocks was designated as a Biological Site of Special Scientific Interest (SSSI). This a conservation designation denoting a protected area in the United Kingdom, selected by Natural England, for areas with particular landscape and ecological characteristics. It provides some protection from development, from other damage, and (since 2000) also from neglect, under the Countryside and Rights of Way Act 2000.

The streams and open water such as Hawkridge Reservoir and Ashford Reservoir on Cannington Brook also provide habitats for a range of species.

=== Flora ===
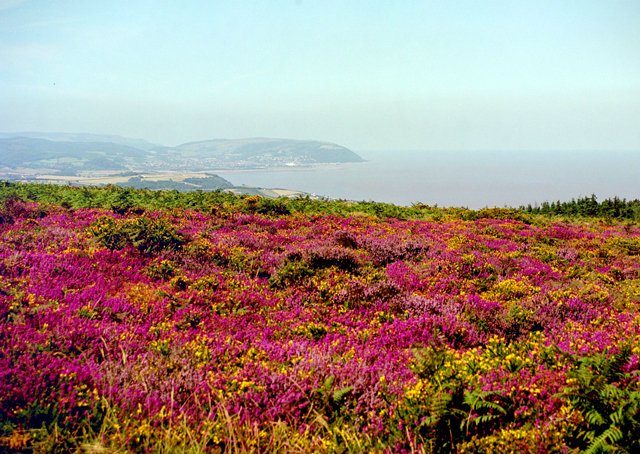
The Northern Flank of Beacon Hill (Quantocks). In late summer the northern Quantocks are ablaze with heather and gorse. Minehead can be seen in the distance.

The hilltops are covered in heathland of gorse, heather, bracken and thorn with plantations of conifer. The western side of the Quantocks are steep scarp slopes of pasture, woods and parkland. Deep stream-cut combes to the north-east contain extensive oak-woods with small flower-rich bogs above them. The areas where there is limited drainage are dominated by heather (Calluna vulgaris), with significant populations of cross-leaved heath (Erica tetralix), purple moor-grass (Molinia caerulea), bilberry (Vaccinium myrtillus) and wavy hair-grass (Deschampsia flexuosa). Drier areas are covered with bell heather (Erica cinerea), western gorse (Ulex gallii) and bristle bent (Agrostis curtisii), while bracken (Pteridium aquilinum) is common on well-drained deeper soils. The springs and streams provide a specialist environment that supports bog pimpernel (Anagallis tenella). The woodland is generally birch/sessile oak woodland, valley alder woodland and ash/wych elm woodland, which support a rich lichen flora. Alfoxton Wood is one of only three British locations where the lichen Tomasellia lectea is present.

=== Fauna ===
The various habitats, together with the wide range of slopes and aspects, provide ideal conditions for a rich fauna. Amphibians including the palmate newt (Triturus helveticus), common frog (Rana temporaris), and common toad (Bufo bufo) are represented in the damper environments. Reptiles present include adder (Vipera berus), grass snake (Natrix natrix), slowworm (Anguis fragilis) and common lizard (Lacerta vivipara). Many bird species breed on the Quantocks, including the grasshopper warbler (Locustella naevia), nightjar (Caprimulgus europaeus), raven (Corvus corax) and the European pied flycatcher (Ficedula hypoleuca). The Quantocks are also an important site for red deer (Cervus elaphus). Invertebrates of note include the silver-washed fritillary butterfly (Argynnis paphia), and three nationally rare dead-wood beetles: Thymalus limbatus, Orchesia undulata and Rhinosimus ruficollis.

== History ==
=== Origins ===
Evidence of activity in the Quantocks from prehistoric times includes finds of Mesolithic flints at North Petherton and Broomfield and many Bronze Age round barrows (marked on maps as tumulus, plural tumuli), such as Thorncombe Barrow above Bicknoller. Several ancient stones can be seen, such as the Triscombe Stone and the Long Stone above Holford. Many of the tracks along ridges of the Quantocks probably originated as ancient ridgeways. A Bronze Age hill fort, Norton Camp, was built to the south at Norton Fitzwarren, close to the centre of bronze making in Taunton.

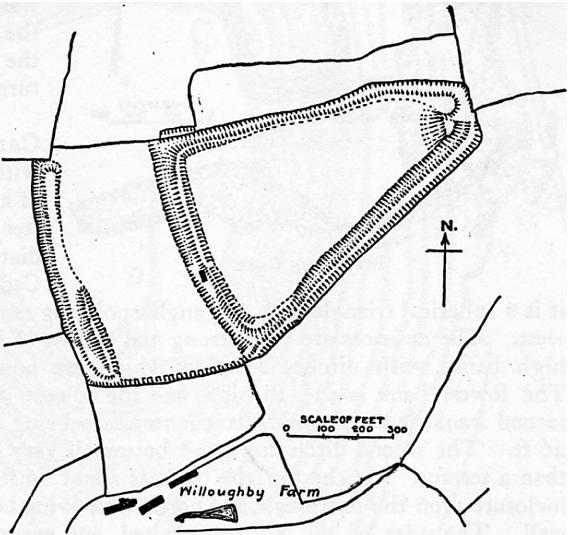
Earthworks at Ruborough Camp

Iron Age sites in the Quantocks include major hill forts at Dowsborough and Ruborough, as well as several smaller earthwork enclosures, such as Trendle Ring and Plainsfield Camp. Ruborough near Broomfield is on an easterly spur from the main Quantock ridge, with steep natural slopes to the north and south east. The fort is triangular in shape, with a single rampart and ditch (univallate), enclosing 4 acres (1.6 ha). A linear outer work about 131 yards (120 m) away, parallel to the westerly rampart, encloses another 4 acres (16,000 m^{2}). The name Ruborough comes from Rugan beorh or Ruwan-beorge meaning Rough Hill. The Dowsborough fort has an oval shape, with a single rampart and ditch (univallate) following the contours of the hill top, enclosing an area of 7 acres (2.8 ha). The main entrance is to the east, towards Nether Stowey, with a simpler opening to the north west, aligned with a ridgeway leading down to Holford. A col to the south connects the hill to the main Stowey ridge, where a linear earthwork known as Dead Woman's Ditch cuts across the spur.

Little evidence exists of Roman influence on the Quantock region beyond isolated finds and hints of transient forts. A Roman port was at Combwich, and it is possible that a Roman road ran from there to the Quantocks, because the names Nether Stowey and Over Stowey come from the Old English stan wey, meaning stone way. In October 2001 the West Bagborough Hoard of 4th-century Roman silver was discovered in West Bagborough. The 681 coins included two denarii from the early 2nd century, and eight miliarense and 671 siliqua dating to 337–367 AD. The majority were struck in the reigns of emperors Constantius II and Julian and derive from a range of mints including Arles and Lyon in France, Trier in Germany and Rome.

=== Dark Ages and Anglo-Saxon ===
The area remained under Romano-British Celtic control until 681–685 AD, when Centwine of Wessex pushed west from the River Parrett, conquered the Welsh King Cadwaladr, and occupied the rest of Somerset north to the Bristol Channel. Saxon rule was later consolidated under King Ine, who established a fort at Taunton in about 700 AD.

The first documentary evidence of the village of Crowcombe is by Æthelwulf of Wessex in 854, where it was spelt 'Cerawicombe'. At that time the manor belonged to Glastonbury Abbey. In the later Saxon period, King Alfred led the resistance to Viking invasion from Athelney, south-east of the Quantocks. According to the Anglo-Saxon Chronicle, the early port at Watchet was plundered by Danes in 987 and 997. Alfred established a series of forts and lookout posts linked by a military road, or herepath, so his army could cover Viking movements at sea. The herepath has a characteristic form that is familiar on the Quantocks: a regulation 66-foot (20 m) wide track between avenues of trees growing from hedge laying embankments. The herepath ran from the ford on the River Parrett at Combwich, past Cannington hill fort to Over Stowey, where it climbed the Quantocks along the line of the current Stowey road, to Crowcombe Park Gate. Then it went south along the ridge, to Triscombe Stone. One branch may have led past Lydeard Hill and Buncombe Hill, back to Alfred's base at Athelney. The main branch descended the hills at Triscombe, then along the avenue to Red Post Cross, and west to the Brendon Hills and Exmoor. There is some evidence that an area of the hills known as Quantock Common may have been a Saxon Royal Forest.

=== Medieval ===
After the Norman conquest of England in 1066 William de Moyon was given land at Dunster, Broomfield and West Quantoxhead, his son becoming William de Mohun of Dunster, 1st Earl of Somerset, while William Malet received Enmore. East Quantoxhead was given to the Luttrells (previously spelled de Luterel), who passed the manor down through descendants into the 20th century. A Luttrell also became the Earl of Carhampton and acquired Dunster Castle in 1376, holding it until it became a National Trust property in 1976.

Stowey Castle at Nether Stowey was built in the 11th century. The castle is sited on a small isolated knoll, about 390 ft (119 m) high. It consisted of a square keep (which may have been stone, or a wooden superstructure on stone foundations) and its defences and an outer and an inner bailey. The mount is 29 ft (9 m) above the 6 ft (2 m) wide ditch which itself is 7 ft (2 m) deep. The motte has a flat top with two large and two small mounds, which may be sites of towers, at the edge. The Blue Lias rubble walling is the only visible structural remains of the castle, which stand on a conical earthwork with a ditch approximately 820 ft (250 m) in circumference. The castle was destroyed in the 15th century, which may have been as a penalty for the local Lord Audley's involvement in the Second Cornish Uprising of 1497 led by Perkin Warbeck against the taxes of Henry VII. Some of the stone was used in the building of Stowey Court in the village.

=== Modern ===
There was very little action on the Quantocks during the English Civil War. Sir John Stawell of Cothelstone was a leading Royalist. When Taunton fell to parliamentary troops and was held by Robert Blake, he attacked Stawell at Bishops Lydeard and imprisoned him. After the restoration Charles II conferred the title of Baron Stawell on Stawell's son Ralph. A group of Clubmen met at Triscombe in 1645 and petitioned parliament calling for peace through negotiation.

At the end of the Monmouth Rebellion of 1685, (also known as the Pitchfork Rebellion), many participants were executed in the Quantocks. The rebellion was an attempt to overthrow the King of England, James II, who became king when his elder brother, Charles II, died on 6 February 1685. James II was unpopular because he was Roman Catholic, and many people were opposed to a "papist" king. James Scott, 1st Duke of Monmouth, claimed to be rightful heir to the throne and attempted to displace James II. The rebellion ended with the defeat of Monmouth's forces at the Battle of Sedgemoor on 6 July 1685. Monmouth was executed for treason on 15 July, and many of his supporters were executed, including some by hanging at Nether Stowey and Cothelstone, or transported in the Bloody Assizes of Judge Jeffreys.

Dodington was the site of the Buckingham Mine where copper was extracted. The mine was established before 1725 and followed earlier exploration at Perry Hill, East Quantoxhead. It was financed by the Marquis of Buckingham until 1801 when it was closed, until various attempts were made to reopen it during the 19th century.

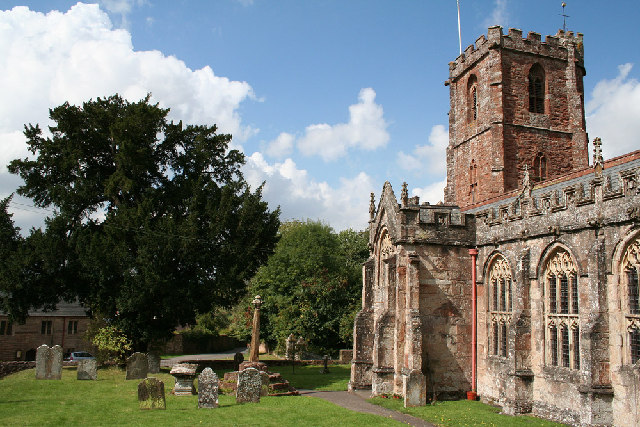
Crowcombe Church

In 1724 the 14th-century spire of the Church of the Holy Ghost in Crowcombe was damaged by a lightning strike. The top section of the spire was removed and is now planted in the churchyard, and stone from the spire was used in the flooring of the church. Inside the church, carved bench-ends dating from 1534 depict such pagan subjects as the Green Man and the legend of the men of Crowcombe fighting a two-headed dragon.

Norton Fitzwarren was the site of a boat lift on the now unused section of the Grand Western Canal from 1839 to 1867. A 300-person prisoner of war camp built here during World War II housed Italian prisoners from the Western Desert Campaign and German prisoners from the Battle of Normandy.

== Walking routes ==
Poet Samuel Taylor Coleridge lived in Nether Stowey in the Quantocks from 1797 to 1799. In his memory a footpath, The Coleridge Way, was set up by the Exmoor park authorities. The 36-mile (58 km) route begins in Nether Stowey and crosses the Quantocks, the Brendon Hills and Exmoor before finishing in Porlock.

The Quantock Greenway is a footpath that opened in 2001. The route of the path follows a figure of eight centred on Triscombe. The northern loop, taking in Crowcombe and Holford, is 19 miles (31 km) long, and the southern loop to Broomfield extends for 18 miles (29 km). The path travels through many types of landscape, including deciduous and coniferous woodland, private parkland, grazed pasture and cropped fields.

The Macmillan Way West follows the Quantocks ridge for several miles.

== Governance ==
The Quantock Hills were designated as an Area of Outstanding Natural Beauty (AONB) in 1956, the first such designation in England under the National Parks and Access to the Countryside Act 1949. Notice of the intention to create the AONB under The Quantock Hills Area of Outstanding Natural Beauty (Designation) Order, 1956 was published in the London Gazette on 7 February 1956.

Since responsibility for the Quantock AONB is shared between the County Council and three District Councils The Quantock Hills Joint Advisory Committee was set up in 1973. The JAC represents County, District and Parish councils along with representatives from Natural England, Friends of Quantock, the Forestry Commission, The Country Land and Business Association (CLA), Somerset Local Access Forum, the Quantock Commoners Association, the Federation of Small Businesses, the National Trust, and the National Farmers Union. The JAC commissions the AONB service both to draw up management plans for the Quantocks and to carry them out.

== Ownership ==
There is no single owner of the open land on the Quantocks or of the forestry plantations. Major landowners include the Forestry Commission, The National Trust, the Fairfield Estate, the Luttrell Estate, the Tetton Estate, Somerset County Council and Friends of Quantock.

== Cultural references ==
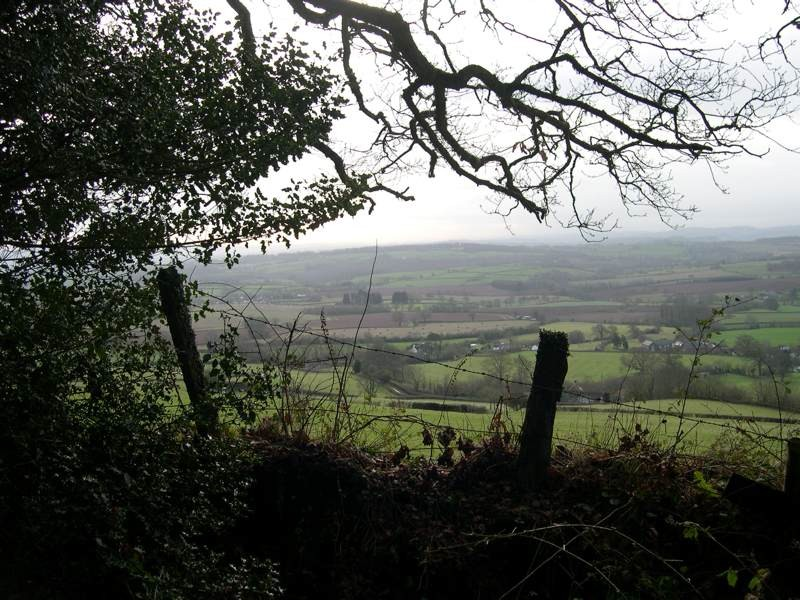
Wooded hillside in the Quantocks

=== Film ===
- The film Pandaemonium (2000), based on the lives of Wordsworth and Coleridge, much of it filmed on the hills.

=== Literature ===
- The poet Samuel Taylor Coleridge lived here for three years from 1797, while he wrote The Rime of the Ancient Mariner (written in 1797–98 and published in 1798), part of Christabel (the first part was reputedly written in 1797, and the second in 1800), Frost at Midnight, and Kubla Khan (completed in 1797 and published in 1816).
- Poet William Wordsworth and his sister Dorothy lived at Alfoxton House in Holford between July 1797 and June 1798, during the time of their friendship with Coleridge.
- In 1913, the poet Edward Thomas wrote a prose account of a bicycle journey to the Quantocks, published in 1914 as "In Pursuit of Spring".
- The poet Henry Newbolt lived in Aisholt in the 1920s. Walter de la Mare stayed with him and wrote in his visitors book:

Happy art thou to lie in that still room

Under the thick-thatched eaves in Aisholt Combe,

Where sings the nightingale, where blooms the broom

- Virginia and Leonard Woolf spent a few days of their honeymoon at The Plough Inn, Holford, before continuing to the continent in 1912. They returned about a year later to try to help Virginia recover from one of her recurring nervous breakdowns.
- Charles Williams visited Aisholt and wrote a poem there.
- The opening of John le Carré's novel Tinker, Tailor, Soldier, Spy (1974) is set in the Quantocks.
- Anne Ridler visited Aisholt many times and wrote a poem titled 'Aisholt Revisited'.
- In the 1980s and 1990s, English novelist Ruth Elwin Harris wrote her Quantock Quartet, a set of novels centred on four sisters growing up around the Quantock Hills during the early 20th century.
- A 1951 poem by J. C. Hall describes a visit to Alfoxton.

=== Art ===
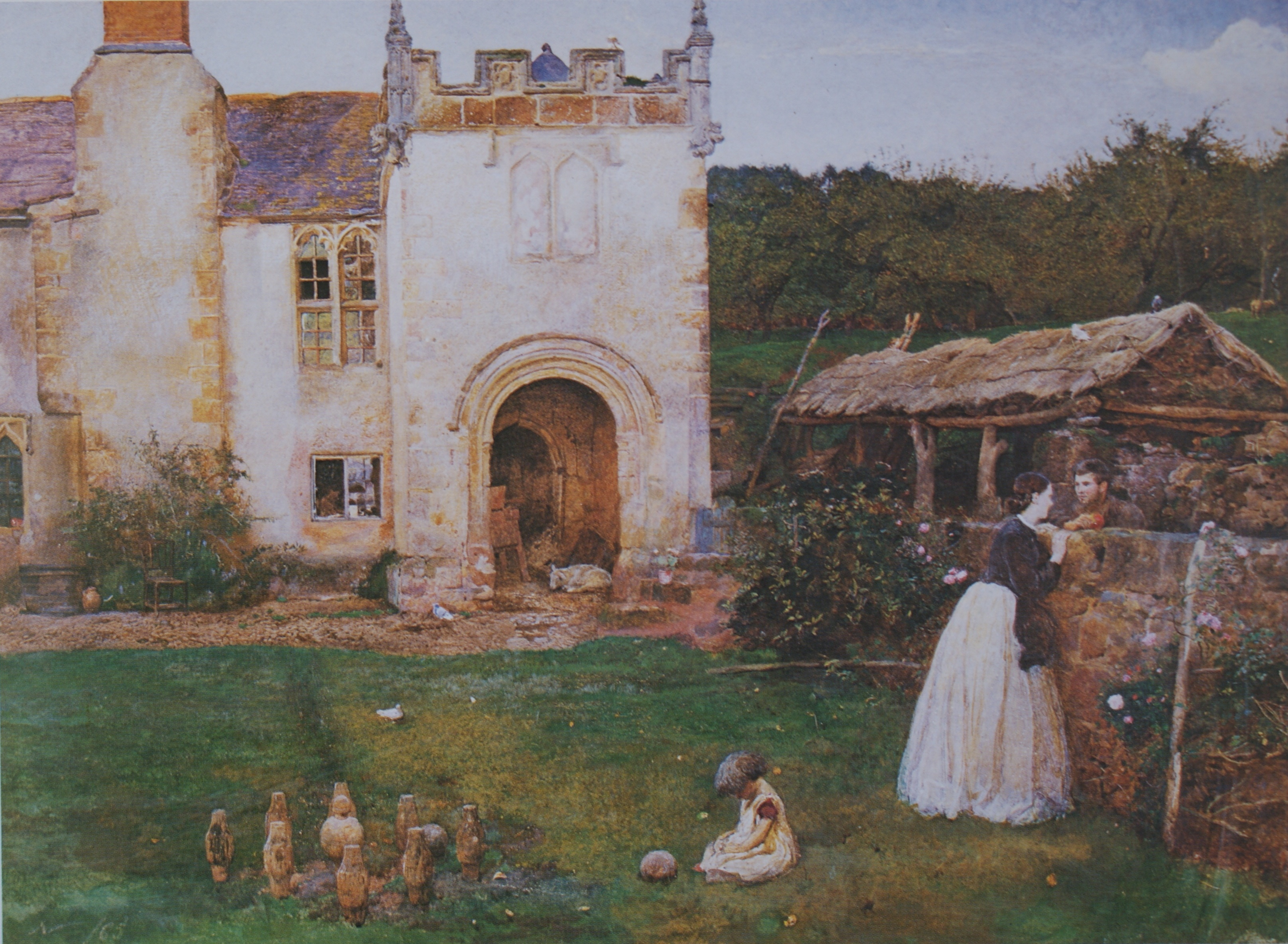
The Old Bowling Green (Halsway Manor, Somerset) (1865). Watercolour, British Museum, London.

- A number of artists spent time on the Quantocks in the 1860s, many of them lodging at Halsway Manor. They are sometimes referred to as the Idyllists. They include John William North, George John Pinwell and Frederick Walker.

=== Music ===
- The video to the Bryan Adams hit "(Everything I Do) I Do It for You" was filmed in the landscape of Holford and Kilve.
- Bibio's album Hand Cranked (2006) features a track titled "Quantock".
- "Checking out the Quantocks", is a line from Half Man Half Biscuit's song "Joy Division Oven Gloves", from their album Achtung Bono.

=== Television ===
- The Doctor Who serial Shada (1980) makes a sidelong reference to this region – the Fourth Doctor (played by Tom Baker) claims that walking through the Time Vortex "is a little trick I learned from a space-time mystic in the Quantocks".
- The Quantocks are the setting for the final episodes of the third and eighth series (2005 and 2012) of Peep Show, which are titled "Quantocking" and "Quantocking II"

== Cultural attractions and places of interest ==
A series of concerts called Music on the Quantocks takes place each year in Quantock villages. Headlining acts have included Sir James Galway, guitarist John Williams and choral groups The Sixteen, The Tallis Scholars and the Gabrieli Consort. The concerts are run by volunteers.

One of the most popular Coleridge Cottage is a cottage situated in Nether Stowey. It was constructed in the 17th century as a building containing a parlour, kitchen and service room on the ground floor and three corresponding bed chambers above. It has been designated by English Heritage as a grade II* listed building. Having served for many years as Moore's Coleridge Cottage Inn, the building was acquired for the nation in 1908, and the following year it was handed over to the National Trust. On 23 May 1998, following a £25,000 appeal by the Friends of Coleridge and the National Trust, two further rooms on the first floor were opened.

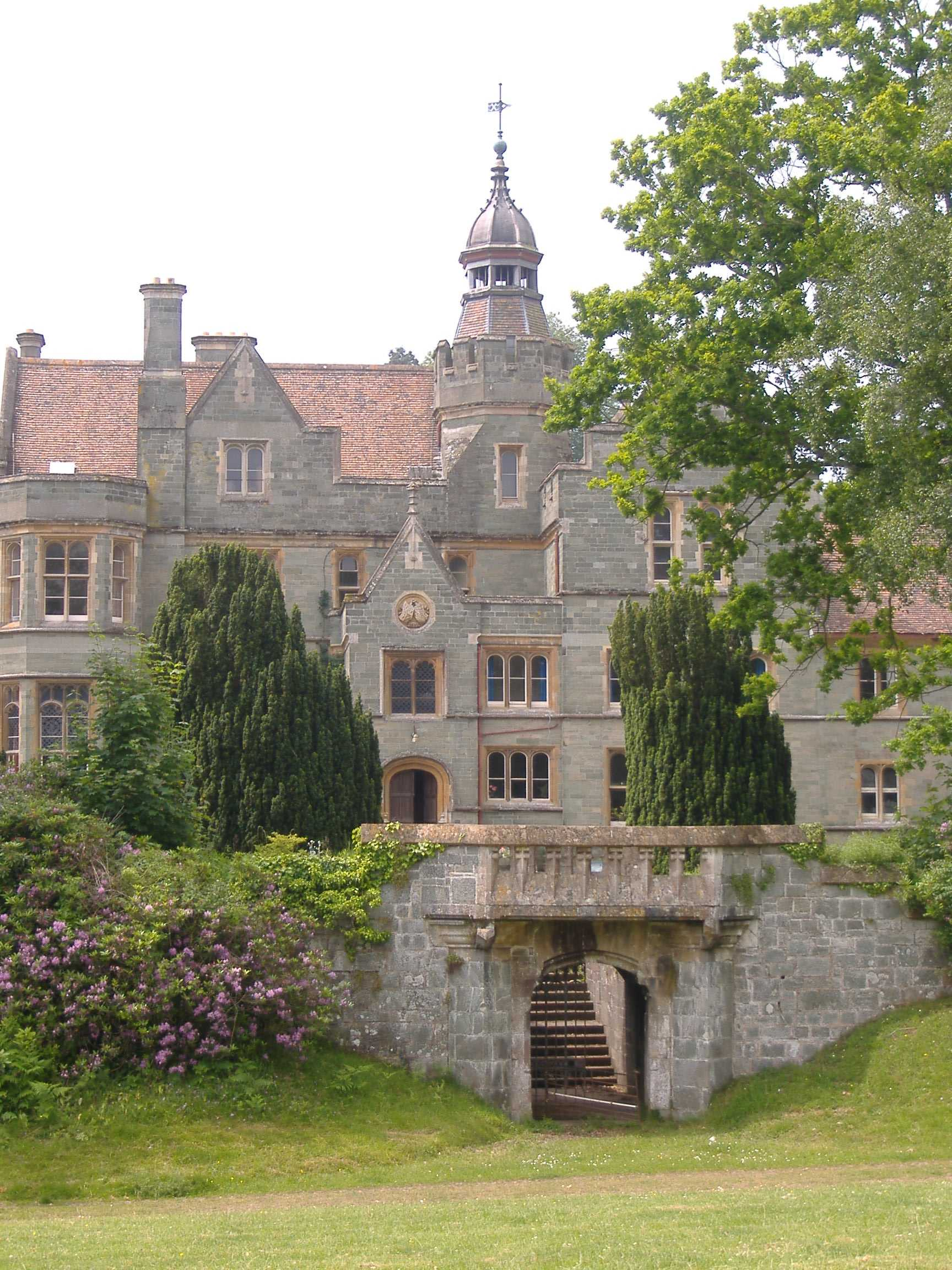
The main building of Quantock Lodge

At Aley is Quantock Lodge, a green-grey 19th-century mansion built from cockercombe tuff. It was the family home of Henry Labouchere, 1st Baron Taunton, until the 1960s when it was converted into a school. In 2000, it became a centre for recreation and banqueting and summer camps for youths.

Broomfield is home to Fyne Court. Once the home of pioneer 19th century electrician, Andrew Crosse. Since 1972 it has been owned by the National Trust. The Quantock Hills National Landscape Service have their headquarters at Fyne Court.

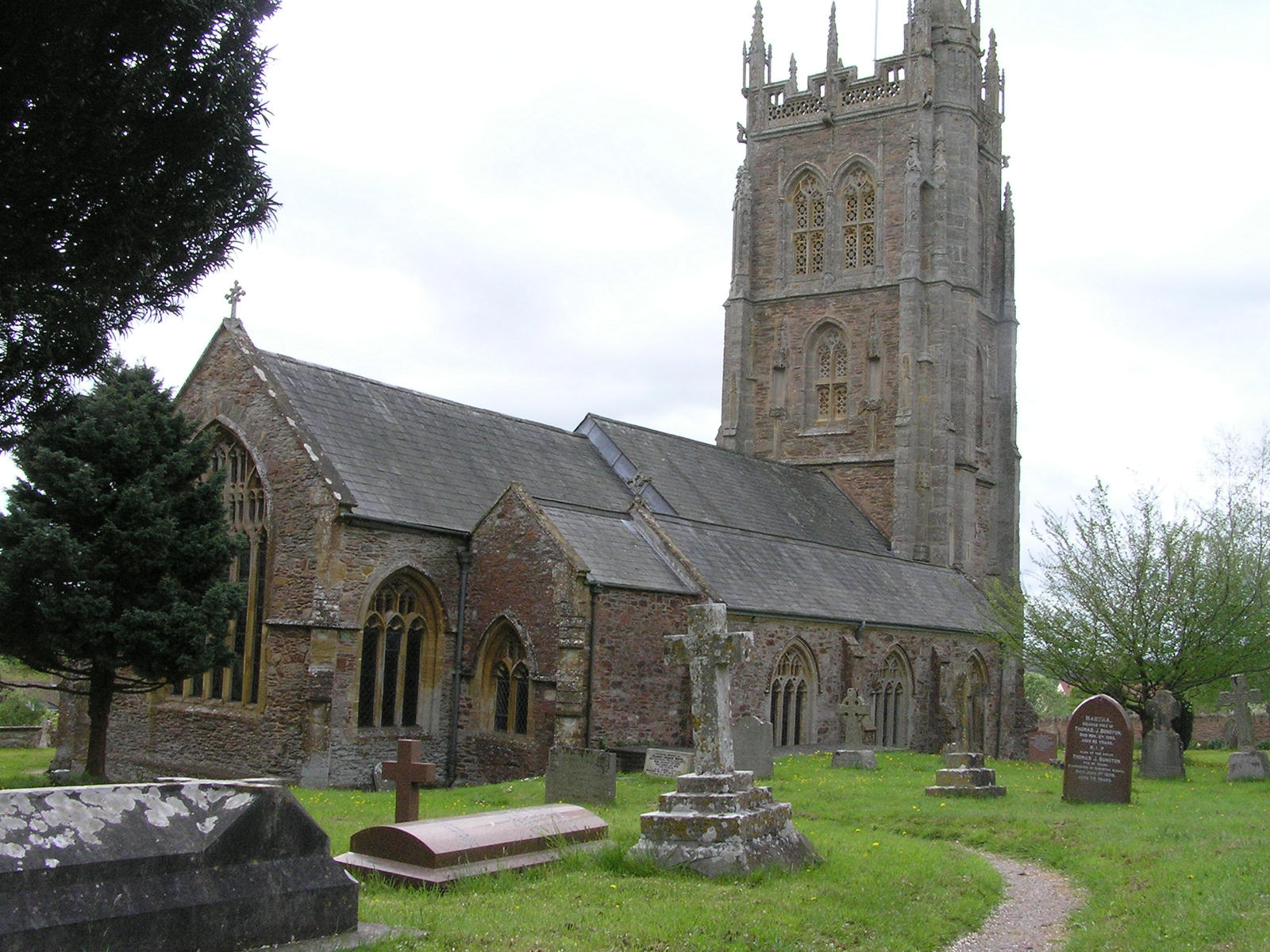
Kingston St Mary's church

The Church of St Mary in Kingston St Mary dates from the 13th century, but the tower is from the early 16th century and was re-roofed in 1952, with further restoration from 1976 to 1978. It is a three-stage crenellated tower, with crocketed pinnacles, bracketed pinnacles set at angles, decorative pierced merlons, and set-back buttresses crowned with pinnacles. The decorative "hunky-punks" are perched high on the corners. These may be so named because the carvings are hunkering (squatting) and are "punch" (short and thick). They serve no function, unlike gargoyles that carry off water. The churchyard includes tombs of the Warre family who owned nearby Hestercombe House, a historic country house in Cheddon Fitzpaine visited by about 70,000 people per year. The site includes a 0.2-acre (810 m^{2}) biological Site of Special Scientific Interest notified in 2000. The site is used for roosting by Lesser horseshoe bats, and has been designated as a Special Area of Conservation (SAC). The house was used as the headquarters of the British 8th Corps during the Second World War, and has been owned by Somerset County Council since 1951. It is used as an administrative centre and a base for the Somerset Fire and Rescue Service.

The originally Norman Church of St Giles in Thurloxton dates from the 14th century but is predominantly from the 15th century with 19th century restoration, including the addition of the north aisle in 1868. It has been designated by English Heritage as a grade II* listed building. From October 1763 to January 1764 the vicar was the diarist James Woodforde.

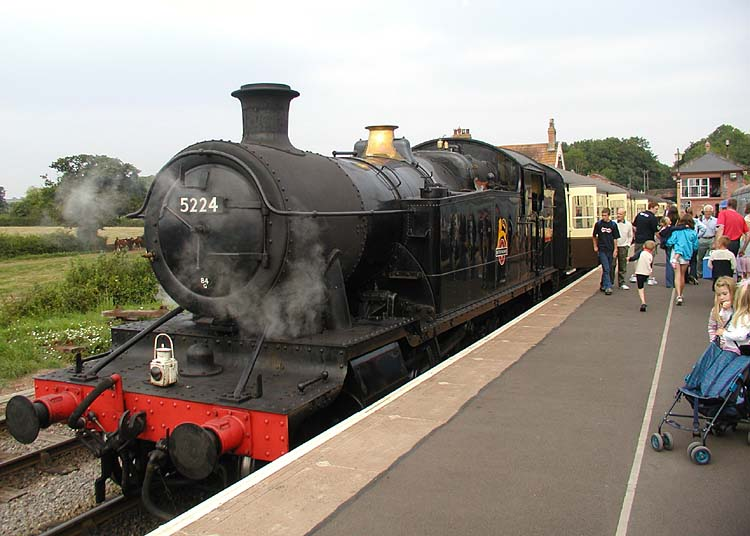
Bishops Lydeard station. The locomotive is Great Western 2-8-0T tank no. 5224.

The West Somerset Railway (WSR) is a heritage railway that runs along the edge of the Quantock Hills between Bishops Lydeard and Watchet. The line then turns inland to Washford, and returns to the coast for the run to Minehead. At 23 miles (37 km), it is the longest privately owned passenger rail line in the UK.

Halsway Manor in Halsway, is now used as England's National Centre for Traditional Music, Dance and Song. It is the only residential folk centre in the UK. The eastern end of the building dates from the 15th century and the western end was a 19th-century addition. The manor, which is mentioned in the Domesday Book, was at one time used by Cardinal Beaufort as a hunting lodge and thereafter as a family home until the mid-1960s when it became the folk music centre. It has been designated by English Heritage as a grade II* listed building.

Halswell House in Goathurst has Tudor origins but was purchased by the Tynte family and rebuilt in 1689. The surrounding park and 17 acres (6.9 ha) pleasure garden was developed between 1745 and 1785. The grounds contain many fish ponds, cascades, bridges and fanciful buildings, including the Temple of Harmony, which stands in Mill Wood and has now been fully restored.

== Principal summits ==
The following table lists the summits with more than 30 metres of prominence (Tumps) that lie within the National Landscape.

| Summit | Elevation | Prominence | Grid reference |
|---|---|---|---|
| Wills Neck | 384.6 m (1262 ft) | 268.2 m | ST164351 |
| Lydeard Hill | 364 m (1194 ft) | 31 m | ST179341 |
| Black Hill | 358 m (1175 ft) | 40 m | ST148381 |
| Dowsborough | 333.1 m (1093 ft) | 48.9 m | ST161391 |
| Cothelstone Hill | 332 m (1089 ft) | 80 m | ST189326 |
| Broomfield Hill | 292 m (958 ft) | 69 m | ST214332 |

== See also ==
- List of Sites of Special Scientific Interest in Somerset
