= List of National Trust properties in Somerset =

National Trust properties in Somerset

1. Barrington Court; 2. Bath Assembly Rooms; 3. Brean Down; 4. Bruton Dovecote; 5. Burrow Mump; 6. Cadbury Camp; 7. Cheddar Gorge; 8. Clevedon Court; 9. Coleridge Cottage; 10. Crook Peak to Shute Shelve Hill; 11. Dolebury Warren; 12. Dovecot at Blackford Farm; 13. Dunster Castle; 14. Dunster Working Watermill; 15. Ebbor Gorge; 16. Fyne Court; 17. Glastonbury Tor; 18. Holnicote Estate	19. King Alfred's Tower; 20. King John's Hunting Lodge; 21. Leigh Woods National Nature Reserve; 22. Lytes Cary; 23. Montacute House; 24. Prior Park Landscape Garden; 25. Sand Point and Middle Hope; 26. Solsbury Hill; 27. Stembridge Mill; 28. Stoke sub Hamdon Priory; 29. The Priest's House; 30. Tintinhull Garden; 31. Treasurer's House; 32. Tyntesfield; 33. Walton and Ivythorn Hills; 34. Wellington Monument; 35. West Pennard Court Barn; 36. Yarn Market, Dunster

The National Trust for Places of Historic Interest or Natural Beauty (informally known as the National Trust) owns or manages a range of properties in the ceremonial county of Somerset, England. These range from sites of Iron and Bronze Age occupations including Brean Down, Cadbury Camp and Cheddar Gorge to Elizabethan and Victorian era mansions, which include examples such as Montacute House and Tyntesfield. Some of the smaller properties include Coleridge Cottage and Stembridge Mill, the last remaining thatched windmill in England.

The ceremonial county of Somerset is governed by three unitary authorities, North Somerset, Bath and North East Somerset and Somerset Council.

Many of the buildings included in the list are listed buildings or scheduled monuments. Listed status refers to a building or other structure officially designated as being of special architectural, historical, or cultural significance; Grade I structures are those considered to be "buildings of exceptional interest". Listing was begun by a provision in the Town and Country Planning Act 1947. A scheduled monument is a "nationally important" archaeological site or historic building, given protection against unauthorised change. Scheduled Monuments are specified in the Ancient Monuments and Archaeological Areas Act 1979, which defines a monument as:

Any building, structure or work above or below the surface of the land, any cave or excavation; any site comprising the remains of any such building, structure or work or any cave or excavation; and any site comprising or comprising the remains of any vehicle, vessel or aircraft or other movable structure or part thereof ...

— (Section 61 (7)).

== Properties ==
List of National Trust properties in Somerset
Site Name Alternative name(s)	Constructed	Scheduling Number	Listed building grade	Location or parish	Image	Description
Barrington Court	1550s	–	I	Barrington; 50.9616°N 2.8599°W	The south front	Barrington Court is a Tudor manor house begun around 1538 and completed in the late 1550s, with a vernacular 17th century stable court. After repair by Alfred Hoare Powell, it was the first house acquired by the National Trust, in 1907, on the recommendation of the antiquarian Canon Hardwicke Rawnsley. In the 1920s the house was renovated, the stable block turned into a residence and several outbuildings, gardens and gateways constructed. The surrounding medieval deerpark and 17th century formal garden had largely disappeared until a new garden was laid out by Gertrude Jekyll in an Arts and Crafts-style in the first half of the 20th century.
Bath Assembly Rooms	1769–1771	–	I	Bath; 51.3866°N 2.3636°W	Assembly Rooms and Fashion Museum	The Bath Assembly Rooms, designed by John Wood, the Younger, in 1769, are a set of elegant assembly rooms located in the heart of the World Heritage City of Bath which are now open to the public. There are four main function rooms in the complex: the 100-foot-long (30 m) ballroom — the largest Georgian interior in Bath; the tea room; the card room; and the octagon.
Brean Down	–	1008211	–	Mendip Hills; 51.3254°N 3.0266°W		Brean Down is a promontory from the coast standing 320 feet (98 m) high and extending 1.5 miles (2 km) into the Bristol Channel at the eastern end of Bridgwater Bay between Weston-super-Mare and Burnham-on-Sea. Made of Carboniferous Limestone, it is a continuation of the Mendip Hills and has exposed steep cliffs. It is rich in wildlife, history and archaeology. It is a Site of Special Scientific Interest. The earliest recorded settlement is from the Early to Middle Bronze Age. Brean Down Fort was built in 1865 as one of the Palmerston Forts to provide protection to the ports of the Bristol Channel. The fort was decommissioned in 1901. During World War II it was rearmed and used for experimental weapons testing. The site has been owned by the National Trust since 2002 after which they instituted a £431,000 renovation project.
Bruton Dovecote	16th century	50820	II*	Bruton; 51.1081°N 2.4531°W		The Bruton Dovecote was built in the 16th century. It was at one time used as a house, possibly as a watchtower and as a dovecote. The building was once within the deerpark of Bruton Abbey and was adapted by the monks from a gabled Tudor tower. The conversion to be a dovecote took place around 1780. It has over 200 pigeon holes. The square tower was built of local stone with Doulting stone dressings. Although it is now a roofless ruin and some of the windows have been blocked up, it previously had a chimney and the fireplace can still be seen. The National Trust acquired the freehold from Sir Henry Hugh Arthur Hoare of the Hoare baronets whose family seat was at Stourhead, in 1915.
Burrow Mump	–	–	II*	Burrowbridge; 51.0684°N 2.9205°W		Burrow Mump is a hill and historic site overlooking Southlake Moor in the village of Burrowbridge. Burrow Mump is also known as St Michael's Borough or Tutteyate. The hill and ruined roofless nave, with the remains of the porch and some window openings, were presented, in 1946, by Major Alexander Gould Barrett, to the National Trust and serve as a memorial to the 11,281 Somerset men who lost their lives during the first and second world wars.
Cadbury Camp	–	195367	–	Tickenham; 51.4463°N 2.7880°W		Cadbury Camp is an Iron Age hill fort. Local legends associate it with Arthurian England and Camelot, though these may be due to confusion with the better-known Cadbury Castle, near South Cadbury, some 50 miles (80 km) to the south. The hill fort is well preserved, and is managed by the National Trust.
Cheddar Gorge	–	–	–	Cheddar; 51.2829°N 2.7668°W		Cheddar Gorge is a limestone gorge in the Mendip Hills. The gorge is the site of the Gough's Cave, where Britain's oldest complete human skeleton, Cheddar Man, estimated to be over 9,000 years old, was found in 1903. Older remains from the Upper Late Palaeolithic era (12,000–13,000 years ago) have been found. The caves, produced by the activity of an underground river, the Cheddar Yeo, contain stalactites and stalagmites. Cheddar Gorge, including the caves and other attractions, has become a tourist destination attracting about 500,000 visitors per year.
Clevedon Court	14th century	–	I	Clevedon; 51.4407°N 2.8335°W		Clevedon Court is a manor house, dating from the early 14th century. The great hall and chapel block are the earliest surviving parts of the structure with the west wing being added around 1570, when the windows and decoration of the rest of the building were changed. Further construction and adaptation was undertaken in the 18th century when it was owned by the Elton baronets. The house was acquired by the nation and was given to the National Trust in part-payment for death duties in 1960. The Elton family is still resident in the house, which is now open to the public. In addition to the main house, the grounds include a selection of walls and outbuildings, some of which date back to the 13th century. The gardens are listed (Grade II*) on the Register of Historic Parks and Gardens of special historic interest in England.
Coleridge Cottage	17th century	–	II*	Nether Stowey; 51.1521°N 3.1537°W		Coleridge Cottage is a cottage constructed in the 17th century. It contains a parlour, kitchen and service room on the ground floor and three bed chambers above. The poet Samuel Taylor Coleridge lived at the cottage for three years from 1797 while writing This Lime-Tree Bower My Prison, The Rime of the Ancient Mariner, part of Christabel, and Frost at Midnight. The cottage was refurbished in 1800. Having served for many years as 'Moore's Coleridge Cottage Inn', the building was acquired for the nation in 1908, and the following year it was handed over to the National Trust. In 2011 the Friends of Coleridge and the National Trust carried out redevelopment of the site.
Crook Peak to Shute Shelve Hill	–	–	–	Mendip Hills; 51.2952°N 2.8814°W		Crook Peak to Shute Shelve Hill is a 332.2 hectares (821 acres) geological and biological Site of Special Scientific Interest near the western end of the Mendip Hills, notified in 1952. Shute Shelve Hill, which is formed of Carboniferous Limestone laid down in the Lower Carboniferous period about 350 million years ago, rises to 233 metres (764 ft) above sea level. The site extends for some 5 kilometres (3.1 mi) from west to east. This site comprises a wide range of habitats which includes ancient and secondary semi-natural broadleaved woodland, unimproved calcareous grassland and a complex mosaic of calcareous grassland and acidic dry dwarf-shrub heath. There are cave deposits of interest at the southern end of Crook Peak. Picken's Hole is of considerable importance because of its clear, well-stratified sequence of deposits and faunas, all dating from within the last Ice Age.
Dolebury Warren	–	–	–	Churchill/Rowberrow; 51.32747°N 2.78358°W		Dolebury Warren is a 90.6 hectare biological Site of Special Scientific Interest (SSSI) near the villages of Churchill and Rowberrow in North Somerset, notified in 1952. It is owned by the National Trust, who acquired the freehold in 1983 and managed by the Avon Wildlife Trust. There is evidence of occupation of the site during the Iron Age and as a medieval/post medieval rabbit warren.
Dovecot at Blackford Farm	11th century	1345406	II*	Selworthy; 51.1967°N 3.5403°W		The Dovecot at Blackford Farm was built in the 11th century. It was attached to a mansion house which burnt down in 1875. The dovecote which forms part of the property of the Holnicote Estate, was donated to the National Trust by Sir Richard Thomas Dyke Acland, 15th Baronet in 1944.
Dunster Castle	11th century	–	I	Dunster; 51.1804°N 3.4437°W	Upper sections of castle walls and towers showing above trees.	Dunster Castle is a former motte-and-bailey castle, now a country house. The castle lies on the top of a steep hill called the Tor, which has been fortified since the late Anglo-Saxon period. After the Norman Conquest of England in the 11th century, William de Mohun constructed a timber castle on the site as part of the pacification of Somerset. A stone shell keep was built on the motte by the start of the 12th century. At the end of the 14th century the de Mohuns sold the castle to the Luttrell family, who continued to occupy the property until the late 20th century. The medieval castle walls were mostly destroyed following a siege at the end of the English Civil War. In the 1860s and 1870s, the architect Anthony Salvin was employed to remodel the castle to fit Victorian tastes. Following the death of Alexander Luttrell in 1944, the family was unable to afford the death duties on his estate and sold the castle and surrounding lands. The Luttrells bought back the castle in 1954, but in 1976 Colonel Walter Luttrell gave it and most of its contents to the National Trust.
Dunster Working Watermill	c. 1780	–	II	Dunster; 51.1825°N 3.4459°W		The Working Watermill (also known as Castle Mill) is a restored 18th century watermill, situated on the River Avill, in the grounds of Dunster Castle. The present mill, which was built around 1780, is on the site of a mill mentioned in the Domesday Book. It was restored to working order in 1979. The mill is still used to grind wheat flour.
Ebbor Gorge	–	–	–	Mendip Hills; 51.234°N 2.682°W		Ebbor Gorge is a limestone gorge in the Mendip Hills, close to Wells. It was designated as a 63.5-hectare (157-acre) biological Site of Special Scientific Interest in 1952. A 40-hectare (99-acre) area of the gorge is owned by the National Trust, and managed by Natural England as a national nature reserve. There are three marked trails of varying lengths around the steeply wooded gorge. Various caves within the gorge were inhabited by neolithic people. The site is close to Wookey Hole village and caves and offers views across the Somerset Levels to Glastonbury Tor and beyond. The land was donated to the National Trust by Mrs G.W. Hodkinson in memory of Winston Churchill.
Fyne Court	–	–	–	Broomfield; 51.0806°N 3.1143°W		Fyne Court is a nature reserve set in parkland which was originally the pleasure grounds of a large house belonging to pioneer 19th century electrician, Andrew Crosse, whose family had owned the house from its construction. The house burnt down in 1898. Fyne Court has been in the ownership of the National Trust since 1967 and was used as the headquarters of the Somerset Wildlife Trust. The Quantock Hills Area of Outstanding Natural Beauty Service have their headquarters in the grounds. Much of the landscaping, including an arboretum laid out in 1780, has become overgrown and now provides varied habitats including broadleaved woodland, ponds and meadows grazed by highland cattle. The site is home to over 100 species of fungi and some rare invertebrates.
Glastonbury Tor	–	196702	–	Glastonbury; 51.1433°N 2.6992°W		Glastonbury Tor is a hill which features the roofless St. Michael's Tower. The Tor has a striking location in the middle of a plain called the Summerland Meadows, part of the Somerset Levels. The plain is actually reclaimed fenland out of which the Tor once rose like an island but now is a peninsula washed on three sides by the River Brue. The remains of Glastonbury Lake Village nearby were identified in 1892, showing that there was an Iron Age settlement about 300–200 BC on what was an easily defended island in the fens. Earthworks and Roman remains prove later occupation. The spot seems to have been called Ynys yr Afalon (meaning "The Isle of Avalon") by the Britons, and it is believed by some to be the Avalon of Arthurian legend.
Holnicote Estate	–	–	–	Exmoor; 51.206°N 3.562°W		The Holnicote Estate (/ˈhʌnɪˌkʌt/) is a property consisting of 5,026 hectares (12,420 acres) of Exmoor National Park situated in West Somerset. The property was donated to the National Trust in 1944 by Sir Richard Thomas Dyke Acland, 15th Baronet; it had been in the Acland family since 1745. Holnicote Estate contains more than 240 kilometres (150 mi) of footpaths and bridleways. It includes Dunkery Beacon (part of which is Dunkery and Horner Wood National Nature Reserve) and Selworthy Beacon, and the villages and hamlets of Selworthy, Allerford, Bossington, Horner and Luccombe.
King Alfred's Tower	1772	–	I	Brewham; 51.115°N 2.365°W		King Alfred's Tower or The Folly of King Alfred the Great was built as part of the Stourhead estate and landscape. The project to build the tower was conceived in 1762 by the banker Henry Hoare II (1705–1785). The tower was also intended to commemorate the end of the Seven Years' War against France and the accession of King George III. The tower was designed in 1765 by Henry Flitcroft and was completed in 1772 at an estimated cost of between £5,000 and £6,000. The tower is 49 metres (161 ft) high, and is triangular in plan, with round projections at each of the three corners.
King John's Hunting Lodge	c. 1500	–	II*	Axbridge; 51.2872°N 2.8185°W		King John's Hunting Lodge is a wool-merchant's house of around 1500 in Axbridge. The building comprised shops on the ground floor, living areas and workshops on the first floor, and storage and sleeping areas on the second floor. It was saved from probable destruction thanks to a Miss Ripley, who bought it and bequeathed it to the National Trust, which undertook the works necessary to make it fit for visitors. In overhauling the structure of the premises in 1971, the National Trust restored its medieval character by recreating on the ground floor the appearance of arcaded stalls opening onto the street, and the sixteenth-century decoration of the upstairs windows. The property is run as a local history museum by Axbridge and District Museum Trust with support from Somerset County Museums Service and Axbridge Archaeological and Local History Society.
Leigh Woods National Nature Reserve	–	–	–	Long Ashton; 51.4631°N 2.6392°W		Leigh Woods is a 2 square kilometre (490 acre) area of woodland on the south-west side of the Avon Gorge, opposite the English city of Bristol and north of the Ashton Court estate. It is a national nature reserve. Small mountain biking circuits are present in the woods and the area is a popular walking area for Bristolians. Part of the woodland was donated to the National Trust in 1909 by George Alfred Wills, to prevent development of the city beside the gorge. Areas not owned by the National Trust have since been taken over by the Forestry Commission.
Lytes Cary	14th and 15th century	–	I	Charlton Mackrell; 51.0358°N 2.6677°W		Lytes Cary is a manor house with associated chapel and gardens. The property has parts dating to the 14th century, with other sections dating to the 15th, 16th, 18th, and 20th centuries. "Yet all parts blend to perfection with one another and with the gentle sunny landscape that surrounds them," comments Nikolaus Pevsner. The chapel predates the existing house, and functioned as a chantry chapel, where masses could be said for the souls of the family, both living and dead. The gardens are listed as Grade II on the Register of Historic Parks and Gardens of special historic interest in England.
Montacute House	1598	1252021	I	Montacute; 50.9524°N 2.716°W		Montacute House is a late Elizabethan country house, a textbook example of English architecture during a period that was moving from the medieval Gothic to the Renaissance Classical, and one of the finest houses to survive from the Elizabethan era. It was visited by 119,590 people in 2011. Designed by an unknown architect, the three-floored mansion, constructed of the local Ham Hill stone, was built in about 1598 by Sir Edward Phelips, Master of the Rolls; his descendants occupied the house until the early 20th century. Following a brief period when the house was let to tenants, it was acquired by the National Trust in 1927. Since 1975, the mansion's Long Gallery, the longest in England, has served as a regional outpost of the National Portrait Gallery.
The Priest's House, Muchelney	1308	–	II	Muchelney; 51.0211°N 2.8152°W		The Priest's House was built by Muchelney Abbey in 1308 for the parish priest and incorporates a Gothic doorway, tracery windows and a 15th-century fireplace. The building was said to be "ruinous" in 1608. It was used by the vicar or curate until around 1840, when the house was used as a cellar and later as a school; in the late 19th century it was rented by a farmer. The building, which was acquired by the National Trust in 1911, is rented to a tenant who provides limited access to the public.
Prior Park Landscape Garden	18th century	1004514	I(Palladian bridge)	Bath; 51.3672°N 2.3437°W		Prior Park Landscape Garden is an 18th-century landscape garden, designed by the poet Alexander Pope and the landscape gardener Capability Brown. It is south of Bath. The garden was influential in defining the style of garden known as the "English garden" in continental Europe. Prior Park was created by local entrepreneur and philanthropist Ralph Allen from about 1734 until his death in 1764. The 28 acre (113,000 m^{2}) landscape garden is set in a site running down a small steep valley, with views of the city of Bath. Its many interesting features include a Palladian bridge (one of only 4 left in the world), Gothic temple, gravel cabinet, Mrs Allen's Grotto, and three lakes plus a serpentine lake.
Sand Point and Middle Hope	–	–	–	Near Kewstoke; 51.3908°N 2.9715°W		Sand Point is the peninsula stretching out from Middle Hope, an 84.1 hectare biological and geological Site of Special Scientific Interest. At Middle Hope a sequence of Carboniferous Limestone, and includes limestones, thick volcanic tufts and lavas are exposed. The site contains a Pleistocene aged fossil cliff and shore platform. Among scarce plants found on Sand Point are Smallflower Buttercup, and Honewort. The calcareous grassland is dominated by Festuca species and Dactylis glomerata, while the scrub towards the west of the site is dominated by Hawthorn (Crataegus monogyna) and Blackthorn (Prunus spinosa), while that to the east consists of Common Gorse (Ulex europaeus) and Bramble (Rubus fruticosus agg).
Solsbury Hill	–	–	–	Batheaston; 51.41°N 2.3342°W		Little Solsbury Hill (more commonly known as Solsbury Hill) is a small flat-topped hill and the site of an Iron Age hill fort. It is located above the village of Batheaston. The hill rises to 625 feet (191 m) above the River Avon which is just over 1 mile (2 km) to the south. It is within the Cotswolds Area of Outstanding Natural Beauty. It gives impressive views of the city of Bath and the surrounding area. It was acquired by the National Trust in 1930. The hill was the inspiration for the 1977 song 'Solsbury Hill' by Peter Gabriel.
Stembridge Mill	1822	–	II*	High Ham; 51.0765°N 2.8203°W		Stembridge Tower Mill is the last remaining thatched windmill in England. Stembridge Mill was constructed in 1822, including parts from the earlier Ham Mill which stood nearby, with a 26 feet (7.9 m) high tower on an old mill mound. It was damaged by storms and left running via steam by 1897/8 and last used commercially in 1910. In 1969 Professor H. H. Bellot left the windmill, cottage and garden to the National Trust in his will. The mill has four floors, a thatched cap and is constructed of local limestone known in the area as Blue Lias. The mill is owned by The National Trust and underwent a £100,000 restoration by local craftsmen funded by the Grantscape Community Heritage Fund in 2009 and was re-opened later in the year.
Stoke sub Hamdon Priory Parsonage Farm	14th century	1020665	I	Stoke-sub-Hamdon; 50.9545°N 2.7488°W		Stoke sub Hamdon Priory (which is also known as Parsonage Farm) is a 14th-century former priest's house of the chantry chapel of St Nicholas. The Ham stone building was originally the Provost's Lodging, part of the College Buildings of the Beauchamp Chantry. Before 1304 it may have been the rector's house. After 1518 it became a farm, known as Parsonage Farmhouse, which it remained until around 1960. The priory has been owned by the National Trust since 1946.
Tintinhull Garden	early 20th century	–	I	Tintinhull; 50.9744°N 2.7072°W		Tintinhull Garden is a small 20th century Arts and Crafts garden surrounding a 17th-century house. Tintinhull House was built of Hamstone, being reshaped in the early 18th century. The house was the property of the Napper family (who also owned Tintinhull Court) by 1630, and was passed down in the family until they sold it sometime after 1814. The garden layout, with areas separated by walls and hedges, was developed in the early 20th century, and expanded and planted starting in 1933 by Phyllis Reiss in a "Hidcote" style. In 1954 Reiss gave the house and garden to the National Trust, but continued to live in the house and care for the garden until her death in 1961. From then on, the Trust let the house to a variety of tenants, including the garden designer and writer Penelope Hobhouse and her husband Professor John Malins from 1980 to 1993. The gardens are included in the Register of Historic Parks and Gardens of special historic interest in England and feature small pools and an azelea garden.
Treasurer's House	13th century	–	I	Martock		The Treasurer's House is a medieval priest's house built from Hamstone during the 13th century, with various extensions and alterations since. The Great Hall was completed in 1293 and there is an even earlier Solar Block with an interesting wall painting.
Tyntesfield	1860s	–	I	Wraxall; 51.4403°N 2.7135°W		Tyntesfield is a Victorian Gothic Revival estate. It is named after the Tynte baronets who had owned estates in the area since around 1500. It was the site of a 16th-century hunting lodge which was used as a farmhouse until the early 19th century. In the 1830s a Georgian mansion was built on the site, which was bought by William Gibbs. In the 1860s he had the house significantly expanded and remodelled, with a chapel being added in the 1870s. The Gibbs family owned the house until the death in 2001 of George Gibbs (known as Richard). The house was acquired by the National Trust in June 2002 after a fund raising campaign to prevent it being sold to private interests and ensure it be opened to the public. It was opened to visitors for the first time just 10 weeks after the acquisition. It was visited by 189,329 people in 2012, an 8.5% fall on the previous year.
Walton and Ivythorn Hills	–	–	–	Street; 51.1083°N 2.7513°W		Walton and Ivythorn Hills is a 34.9 hectare (86.1 acre) biological Site of Special Scientific Interest near Walton and Street at the south-eastern end of the Polden Hills. The Trust acquired 0.248 hectares (0.61 acres) of Ivythorn Hill in 1988, which followed 16.606 hectares (41.03 acres) of Walton Hill in 1940 and the initial 18.751 hectares (46.33 acres) of Ivythorn Hill and Wood in 1919. Walton and Ivythorn Hills support a complex mosaic of semi-natural habitats which includes unimproved calcareous grassland, dense and scattered scrub and broadleaved woodland. Structural diversity within the habitats, together with the extensive areas of sheltered wood-edge and scrub-edge margins, provide ideal conditions for many species of invertebrate. Butterflies, Leafhoppers, Spiders and Soldier Flies are particularly well represented.
Wellington Monument	1854	–	II*	Blackdown Hills; 50.948°N 3.2293°W		The Wellington Monument is a 175 feet (53 m) high triangular tower located on the highest point of the Blackdown Hills, 3 km (1.9 miles) south of Wellington. It was erected to celebrate the Duke of Wellington's victory at the Battle of Waterloo. The foundation stone was laid in 1817, on land belonging to the Duke, but the monument was not completed until 1854. Its design was inspired by an Egyptian obelisk, but in the shape of the type of bayonet used by Wellington's armies. It is 80 feet (24 m) wide at the base. A counterweight hangs inside to help balance the Monument in windy weather. An internal staircase ascends to a viewing platform. In June 2009, the National Trust announced plans to reclad the monument at a cost of £4 million.
West Pennard Court Barn	15th century	–	I	West Bradley; 51.1308°N 2.6489°W		West Pennard Court Barn (which is also known as the Court Barn, West Bradley) is a 15th-century tithe barn for Glastonbury Abbey between West Pennard and West Bradley. The barn was restored in the 1930s by the Society for the Protection of Ancient Buildings, with the work being funded by Roger Clark of the local shoemakers C. & J. Clark. It has been owned by the National Trust since 1938. The upper floor has an unusual floor made of compacted earth. The rectangular five bay stone barn is supported by buttresses. The roof was originally thatched but is now tiled.
Yarn Market, Dunster	c. 1590	–	I	Dunster; 51.1845°N 3.4442°W		The Yarn Market was built around 1590. The octagonal structure has a central stone pier which supports a heavy timber framework which carries a slate roof with central wooden lantern surmounted by a weather vane. Around 1590 George Luttrell, of the Luttrell family constructed the market to shelter traders and their wares from the rain. One of the roof beams has a hole in it, a result of cannon fire in the Civil War, when Dunster Castle was a besieged Royalist stronghold. Following the damage, it was restored in 1647 to its present condition. It is in the guardianship of English Heritage but is managed by the National Trust.

== See also ==
- List of National Trust properties in England
- List of English Heritage properties in Somerset
