= Fyne Court =

National trust nature reserve in England

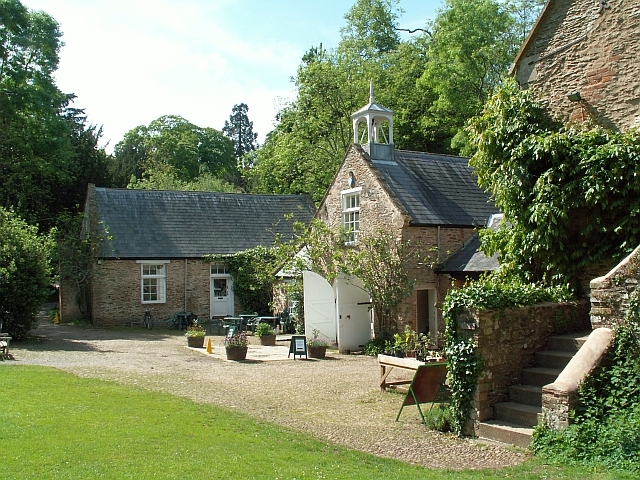
- The cafe and shop at Fyne Court

- Location within Somerset

General information
- Location: Broomfield, England
- Coordinates: 51.080563°N 3.114310°W
- Construction started: c.1629
- Demolished: 1894
- Client: Andrew Crosse

Fyne Court is a National Trust-owned nature reserve and visitor centre in Broomfield, Somerset, England. It was formerly an estate, and large English country house, belonging to the Crosse family.

Andrew Crosse conducted a series of experiments with electricity, including the development of large voltaic piles, at the house during his ownership in the early 19th century. The main building of Fyne Court burnt down in 1894. The buildings which survived the fire have been used as offices and a visitor centre by organisations such as the Somerset Wildlife Trust and Quantock Hills Area of Outstanding Natural Beauty Service since it came into the ownership of the National Trust in 1967. It is surrounded by a large country estate of woodland, ponds and meadows. Within the grounds are a folly and boathouse.

== History ==
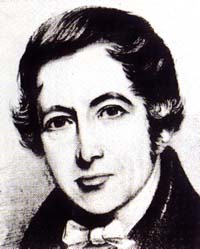
Andrew Crosse

The nature reserve is set in parkland which was originally the pleasure grounds of a large house belonging to 19th-century scientist and pioneer in electricity, Andrew Crosse. His family had owned the house from its construction, Fyne Court having been built in around 1629 by an earlier Andrew Crosse, who had purchased part of the manor of Broomfield. The house had been enlarged and extensively remodelled by Andrew Crosse (1704–66), great-uncle of the scientist, who also completed a fashionable Arcadian garden including five linked ponds, a serpentine lake, and additional tree planting.

Having lost his parents, his father in 1800 and his mother in 1805, Crosse took over the management of the family estates at the age of 21. Among his experiments Crosse erected "an extensive apparatus for examining the electricity of the atmosphere," incorporating at one point an insulated wire some 1.25 miles (2.01 km) long, later shortened to 1,800 feet (550 m), suspended from poles and trees. Using this wire he was able to determine the polarity of the atmosphere under various weather conditions. His results were published by his friend George Singer in 1814, as part of Singer's Elements of Electricity and Electro-Chemistry.

Along with Sir Humphry Davy (who visited Fyne Court in 1827), Crosse was one of the first to develop large voltaic piles. Although it was not the largest he built, Henry Minchin Noad's Manual of Electricity describes a battery consisting of 50 jars containing 73 square feet (6.8 m^{2}) of coated surface. Using his wires Crosse was able to charge and discharge it some 20 times a minute, "accompanied by reports almost as loud as those of a cannon". He became known locally as "the thunder and lightning man". In 1836 Sir Richard Phillips described seeing a wide variety of voltaic piles at Fyne Court, totalling 2,500, of which 1,500 were in use when he visited.

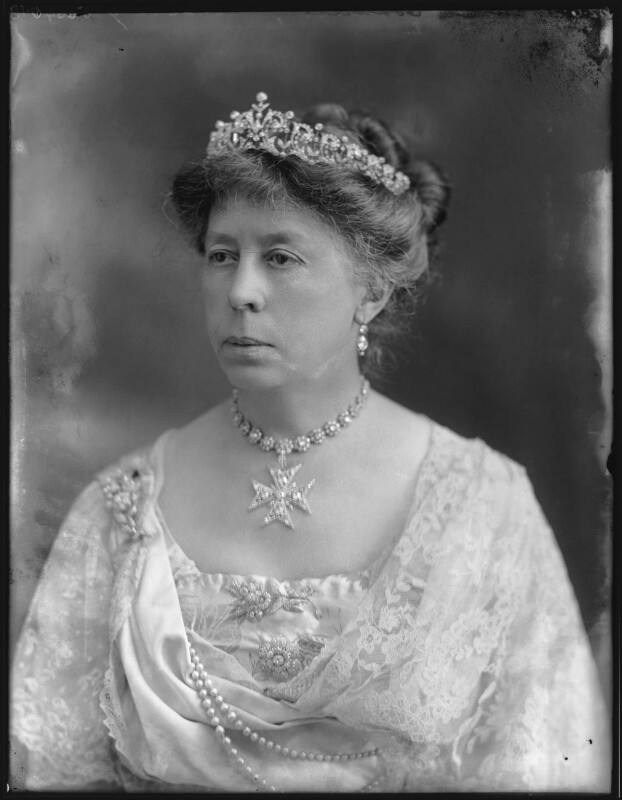
Susan Harris (née Hamilton), Countess of Malmesbury (1854–1935)

The house was the childhood home of Susan Harris, Countess of Malmesbury, who was the daughter of John Hamilton of Fyne Court and the second wife of James Harris, 3rd Earl of Malmesbury, Foreign Secretary and Conservative politician. She published a number of books and articles in her lifetime including 'Village Life in England' in which she recorded some reminiscences of life in Broomfield. She later married Major General Sir John Charles Ardagh who is buried in Church of St Mary & All Saints, Broomfield churchyard and wrote an account of his life.

The house burnt down in 1894. However the detached music room in which Crosse conducted his experiments survived, along with some of the books and oil paintings by Anthony van Dyck and Peter Paul Rubens. The laboratory table on which Crosse carried out experiments stands in the aisle of the Church of St. Mary and All Saints in Broomfield and an obelisk in his memory is in the churchyard.

In 1918 several hundred acres of the woodland within the park was sold at an auction in Taunton. Fyne Court was left to the National Trust by John Adams in 1967, and passed in to the Trust's ownership in 1972 once legal issues were resolved. It was also used as the headquarters of the Somerset Wildlife Trust. The Quantock Hills AONB Service have their headquarters in the grounds.

== Grounds ==
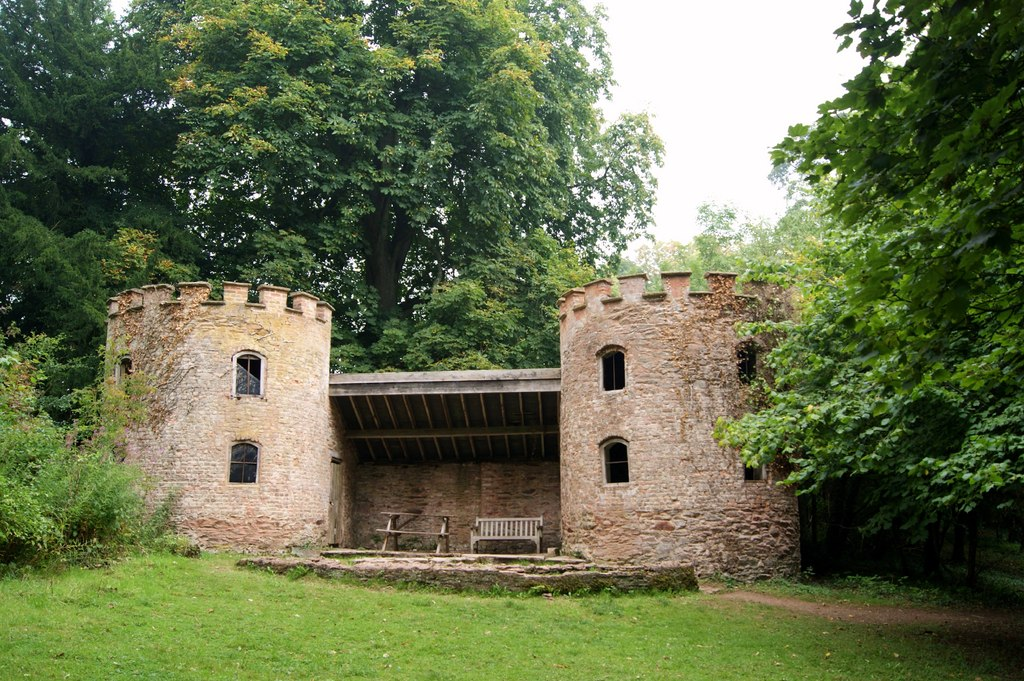
The folly

Fyne Court is surrounded by a 65-acre (260,000 m^{2}) estate. Much of the landscaping, including an arboretum laid out in 1780, has become overgrown and now provides varied habitats including broadleaved woodland, ponds and meadows grazed by highland cattle. The site is home to over 100 species of fungi and some rare invertebrates. In the grounds is a folly with two 13 feet (4 m) wide crenelated towers, and a boathouse.

== See also ==
- List of National Trust properties in Somerset
