= List of English Heritage properties in Somerset =

English Heritage properties in Somerset

1. Cleeve Abbey
2. Dunster Butter Cross
3. Farleigh Hungerford Castle
4. Gallox Bridge, Dunster
5. Muchelney Abbey
6. Nunney Castle

7. Sir Bevil Grenville's Monument
8. Stanton Drew stone circles
9. Stoney Littleton Long Barrow
10. The Abbot's Fish House, Meare
11. The Tribunal, Glastonbury
12. Yarn Market, Dunster

English Heritage (officially the English Heritage Trust) is a registered charity that looks after the National Heritage Collection. English Heritage is steward of over 400 significant historical and archaeological sites. It has direct ownership over some historic sites and also liaises with private owners of sites that are managed under guardianship arrangements. In Somerset there are twelve sites, ranging from Neolithic sites such as Stanton Drew stone circles and Stoney Littleton Long Barrow through medieval castles and religious sites such as Farleigh Hungerford Castle and Cleeve Abbey to the most recent, Sir Bevil Grenville's Monument, which was erected in 1720.

The ceremonial county of Somerset is governed by three unitary authorities, North Somerset, Bath and North East Somerset and Somerset Council.

Many of the buildings included in the list are listed buildings or scheduled monuments. Listed status refers to a building or other structure officially designated as being of special architectural, historical, or cultural significance; Grade I structures are those considered to be "buildings of exceptional interest". Listing was begun by a provision in the Town and Country Planning Act 1947. A scheduled monument is a "nationally important" archaeological site or historic building, given protection against unauthorised change. Scheduled monuments are specified in the Ancient Monuments and Archaeological Areas Act 1979, which defines a monument as:

Any building, structure or work above or below the surface of the land, any cave or excavation; any site comprising the remains of any such building, structure or work or any cave or excavation; and any site comprising or comprising the remains of any vehicle, vessel or aircraft or other movable structure or part thereof...

— (Section 61 (7)).

== Properties ==
List of English Heritage properties in Somerset
Site Name	Constructed	Scheduling Number	Listed building grade	Location or parish	Image	Description
Cleeve Abbey	c. 1198	1014824	I	Washford; 51.1556°N 3.3642°W		Cleeve Abbey is a medieval monastery founded in the late twelfth century as a house for monks of the austere Cistercian order. In 1536 Cleeve was closed by Henry VIII in the course of the dissolution of the monasteries and the abbey was converted into a country house. Subsequently, the status of the site declined and the abbey was used as farm buildings until the latter half of the nineteenth century when steps were taken to conserve the remains. Cleeve Abbey is one of the best-preserved medieval Cistercian monastic sites in Britain. While the church is no longer standing, the ancillary buildings are still roofed and habitable and contain many features of particular interest including the 'angel' roof in the refectory and the wall paintings in the painted chamber.
Dunster Butter Cross	15th century	–	II*	Dunster; 51.1851°N 3.4491°W		The Butter Cross in Dunster once stood in the High Street and was moved to its current location on the edge of the village possibly in 1825, though a drawing by J. M. W. Turner made in 1811 suggests it was in its present position by then. The site was levelled in 1776. The base and shaft, which probably date from the 15th century, remain, but the head of the cross has been lost. There is an inscription on the northern face which says "WC, 1871, WS" recording a restoration.
Farleigh Hungerford Castle	c. 1380	1015871	I	Farleigh Hungerford; 51.3177°N 2.2872°W		Farleigh Hungerford Castle, sometimes called Farleigh Castle or Farley Castle, is a medieval castle. The inner court was constructed between 1377 and 1383 by Sir Thomas Hungerford. The castle was built to a quadrangular design, on the site of an existing manor house overlooking the River Frome. At the outbreak of the English Civil War in 1642, the castle was held by Sir Edward Hungerford. Edward declared his support for Parliament. Farleigh Hungerford was seized by Cavalier forces in 1643, but recaptured by Parliament without a fight near the end of the conflict in 1645. As a result, it escaped slighting following the war. The last member of the Hungerford family to hold the castle, Sir Edward Hungerford, inherited it in 1657, but sold it in 1686. By the 18th century the castle fell into disrepair; in 1730 it was bought by the Houlton family, when much of it was broken up for salvage. Antiquarian and tourist interest in the now ruined castle increased through the 18th and 19th centuries. The castle chapel was repaired in 1779 and became a museum of curiosities, complete with the murals rediscovered on its walls in 1844 and a number of rare lead anthropomorphic coffins from the mid-17th century. In 1915 Farleigh Hungerford Castle was sold to the Office of Works and a restoration programme began.
Gallox Bridge, Dunster	15th century	1014410	I	Dunster; 51.1790°N 3.4458°W		The Gallox Bridge in Dunster dates from the 15th century. In the 14th century the river crossing was known as Doddebrigge. The name Gallox is believed to be derived from gallows as the village gallows were nearby. It is a narrow stone packhorse bridge, on the southern outskirts of Dunster, with two arches over the River Avill. It has a roadway width of 1.2 metres (3.9 ft), a total width of 1.9 metres (6.2 ft) and is 13.5 metres (44.3 ft) long.
Muchelney Abbey	12th century	1006230	I	Muchelney; 51.0167°N 2.8203°W		Muchelney Abbey in the village of Muchelney comprises the remains and foundations of a medieval Benedictine abbey, the site of an earlier Anglo-Saxon abbey, and an early Tudor house dating from the 16th century, formerly the lodgings of the resident Abbot. Of the main building only some foundation walls remain. The south cloister walk and the north wall of a refectory are other surviving features. The only intact structure is the Abbot's House with well-preserved architectural features including external stonework and inside a great chamber with ornate fireplace, carved settle and stained glass, and a timber roof. An unusual attraction is the nearby thatched two-storey monks' lavatory, unique in Britain. In 1538 the Abbey with all land and possessions was surrendered by the monks to Henry VIII in the course of the dissolution of the monasteries. The whole property and advowson was then granted to Edward Seymour, Earl of Hertford, later 1st Duke of Somerset. On his execution in 1552 it reverted to the crown.
Nunney Castle	1373	1014716	–	Nunney; 51.2103°N 2.3786°W		Nunney Castle is a medieval castle at Nunney. Built in the late 14th century by Sir John Delamare on the profits of his involvement in the Hundred Years' War, the moated castle's architectural style, possibly influenced by the design of French castles, has provoked considerable academic debate. Remodelled during the late 16th century, Nunney Castle was damaged during the English Civil War and is now ruined. English Heritage maintain the site as a tourist attraction. The architectural historian Nikolaus Pevsner has described Nunney as "aesthetically the most impressive castle in Somerset."
Sir Bevil Grenville's Monument	1720	1015110	II*	Lansdown Hill; 51.4314°N 2.3994°W		Sir Bevil Grenville's Monument is a monument erected in 1720 on Lansdowne Hill, 4 miles (6.4 km) north-west of the city of Bath, to commemorate the heroism of the Civil War Royalist commander Sir Bevil Grenville (1596–1643) of Stowe, Kilkhampton in Cornwall and Bideford in Devon, who on 5 July 1643 fell mortally wounded at the Battle of Lansdowne, leading his regiment of Cornish pikemen.
Stanton Drew stone circles	Neolithic	1007911	–	Stanton Drew; 51.3678°N 2.5753°W		The Stanton Drew stone circles are made up of three circles of standing stones and associated outliers. The largest stone circle is the Great Circle, 113 metres (371 ft) in diameter and the second largest stone circle in Britain (after Avebury); it is considered to be one of the largest Neolithic monuments to have been built. The Great Circle was surrounded by a ditch and is accompanied by smaller stone circles to the north east and south west. There is also a group of three stones, known as The Cove, in the garden of the local pub. Some of the stones are still vertical, but the majority are now recumbent and some are no longer present. The stone circles have been studied since John Aubrey's visit in 1664 with some excavations of the site in the 18th century. In the late 20th and early 21st centuries geophysical surveys have confirmed the size of the stone circles and identified additional pits and postholes. The date of construction is not known but is thought to be between 3000 and 2000 BCE which pales it in the Late Neolithic to Early Bronze Age. The Cove has been shown to be around one thousand years older than the stone circles. A variety of myths and legends about the stone circles have been recorded, including one about dancers at a celebration who have been turned to stone.
Stoney Littleton Long Barrow	Neolithic	1007910	–	Wellow, Somerset; 51.3133°N 2.3813°W		The Stoney Littleton Long Barrow (also known as Bath Tumulus and the Wellow Tumulus) is a Neolithic chambered tomb with multiple burial chambers, located near the village of Wellow, Somerset. It is an example of a Severn-Cotswold tomb. The barrow is about 30 metres (98 ft) in length and 15 metres (49 ft) wide at the south-east end; it stands nearly 3 metres (10 ft) high. Internally it consists of a 12.8 metres (42 ft) long gallery with three pairs of side chambers and an end chamber. There is a fossil ammonite decorating the left-hand doorjamb. The site was excavated by John Skinner in 1816–17 who gained the entry through a hole originally made about 1760. The excavation revealed the bones (some burned) of several individuals. The site was restored in 1858 by Mr T. R. Joliffe, the Lord of the Hundred and an information board has now been provided by English Heritage.
The Abbot's Fish House, Meare	c. 1330	1008018	I	Meare; 51.1718°N 2.776°W		The Abbot's Fish House, was built between 1322 and 1335 when Adam of Sodbury was the abbot of Glastonbury Abbey. The upper floor was the abode of the chief fisherman and the ground floor was used for storing nets and the salting and preparing fish. The fish were caught in Meare Pool which was drained after the dissolution of the monasteries and the fish house fell into disrepair. It suffered a fire in the 19th century which destroyed the roof and gutted the interior. It was re roofed by the Ministry of Works and is now in the care of English Heritage. It is the only surviving monastic fishery building in England.
The Tribunal, Glastonbury	15th century	–	I	Glastonbury; 51.1462°N 2.7098°W		The Tribunal in Glastonbury was built in the 15th century as a medieval merchant's house. The house owes its name to the fact that it was formerly mistakenly identified with the Abbey's tribunals, where secular justice was administered. In the 16th century a new facade was added to the original building. The Tribunal now houses the Glastonbury Lake Village Museum containing Iron Age artefacts and works of art from the Glastonbury Lake Village which were preserved in almost perfect condition in the peat after the village was abandoned. The museum is run by the Glastonbury Antiquarian Society. The building also houses the tourist information centre.
Yarn Market, Dunster	c. 1590	–	I	Dunster; 51.1845°N 3.4442°W		The Yarn Market is an octagonal structure which has a central stone pier which supports a heavy timber framework carrying a slate roof with central wooden lantern surmounted by a weather vane. Around 1600 George Luttrell of the Luttrell family constructed the market to shelter traders and their wares from the rain. One of the roof beams has a hole in it, a result of cannon fire in the Civil War, when Dunster Castle was a besieged Royalist stronghold. Following the damage, it was restored in 1647 to its present condition. It is in the guardianship of English Heritage but is managed by the National Trust.

== See also ==
- List of English Heritage properties
- List of National Trust properties in Somerset
