= Walter Hawkins (ship broker) =

British ship broker and collector

Walter Hawkins (1787 – 27 January 1862) was a British ship and insurance broker, antiquarian and numismatist, based in the City of London.

== Background ==
Walter Hawkins (15 March 1787 – 27 January 1862) was one of six children of John Hawkins, a merchant. He was baptised on 10 April 1787 at New Broad Street Independent church. He was educated in Hackney and was a ship and insurance broker in London until he retired in about 1848. Hawkins retired to 5 Leonard Place, Kensington, and died there, unmarried, on 27 January 1862. His will directed that he be buried in the vault he had purchased at Kensal Green Cemetery (No. 1545). He was interred alongside his brother John (6 January 1779 – 22 February 1845), the only other occupant of the family vault. A brief biographical entry in 1901 begins "b. London, 1787; ed. at Hackney; Russian merchant and ship and insurance broker Finsbury circus, retired 1848;" No evidence has been found of Russian ancestry or business connections for Hawkins.

=== Ship broking ===
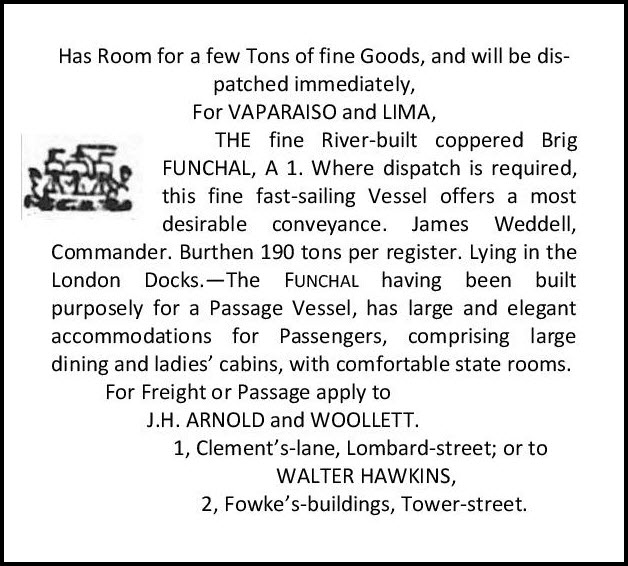
Transcript of newspaper advertisement

Hawkins advertised in newspapers from about 1818, usually in the Public Ledger and Daily Advertiser, to invite cargo and often passengers for ships sailing from London. They were typically coppered Brigs (120–220 tons) and usually destined for South America, including the Funchal which sailed for Valparaiso and Lima in 1827, under the command of James Weddell.

=== Interests, and memberships of learned societies ===
Hawkins had a broad range of interests in the worlds of antiquities and science. He was

- a Fellow of the Zoological Society of London from 1829 until 1858.
- a member of the London Electrical Society. He was elected in 1837, its first year, having been proposed for membership by J P Gassiot on 28 September.
- a member of the Archaeological Institute of Great Britain and Ireland, and the British Archaeological Association.
- a fellow of the Numismatic Society (the forerunner of the present Royal Numismatic Society) for 21 years.
- elected a Fellow of the Society of Antiquaries on 7 April 1842. He frequently used the designation FSA after his name.
- A Proprietor and Visitor of the London Institution.
- a member of the Honourable Artillery Company. The entry in The Cardew-Rendle Roll reads "Hawkins, Walter (adm. 25 May 1808). occ. 'gentleman'; addr. 12 Water Lane, Thames Street. Mily: age at adm. twenty-one. Left 19 August 1812 (resigned)."

Hawkins made good use of his shipping contacts to further his scientific interests. While a member of the London Electrical Society, he was asked in 1839 by fellow member John Samo to take delivery of some “electric fish” which were to be sent in barrels of fresh water on The Matilda Larkie from Berbice, British Guiana to London. Detailed instructions were given to the master of the ship on the feeding of the fish and ensuring that the water should be kept free of salt. Captain Colin Munro wrote to Hawkins in January 1840 explaining that all five fish had died en route, probably from striking the cask as a result of the motion of the ship. A later specimen of the fish, named at the time at Gymnotus electricus, but now termed Electrophorus electricus, was obtained by Hawkins from Venezuela. It was dissected by Henry Letheby and a detailed description of the findings was presented in 1842. Hawkins also obtained from Uruguay what he thought was a wasp's nest (it turned out to be a bee's nest) which he presented to the national collection at the British Museum, accompanied by notes on where it was found, and its construction

In Hawkins's archaeological collection he had, for example “an ancient sword found in the bed of the river Thames in 1739, at the building of Westminster Bridge” which he exhibited in 1844 and a lead sling-bullet “found lodged in the Cyclopean walls of Samé in Cephalonia”. He presented a paper on the use of the sling as a weapon to the Society of Antiquaries in 1847 Hawkins was a very active numismatist who amassed a large collection of medals and coins and wrote papers about them, usually published in The Numismatic Chronicle. In one he gave a full description of the history of the Beard Tax in Russia, and described, with an illustration, the token given as a receipt to those who had paid the tax. In 1839 Hawkins had a medal struck, termed by him the “W. H.” medal. The obverse has representations of three Athenian scenes, involving Spartans, Socrates and Demosthenes. The reverse is inscribed "Industry Courtesy and Integrity", surrounded by "W. H. To encourage steady perseverance in industry, courtesy, and integrity" and an ornamental border. He was in the habit of presenting his medal to young persons, in the hope of promoting the qualities mentioned on it.

Walter Hawkins's wide range of interests was expanded by his correspondence with men who had traveled widely and had inquiring minds. For example, Joachim Hayward Stocqueler, the journalist and author who had spent several years in India, met Hawkins at a lecture in London in 1845. Stocqueler wrote to Hawkins two days later, on 14 March, enclosing a sketch of a paan leaf, and described how it is used in the chewing of thinly sliced betel nut, which is “in such very common use in India”, and which they had discussed when they met On another occasion Hawkins received, in reply to one of his, a 69-page letter from Dr William Holt Yates (Physician to the Royal General Dispensary, London) beginning “Thoughts on Communication between the Living and the Dead, Sorcery, Witchcraft etc.” which Hawkins summarised in two pages of bullet points for his own reference

=== Bequeathal of possessions ===
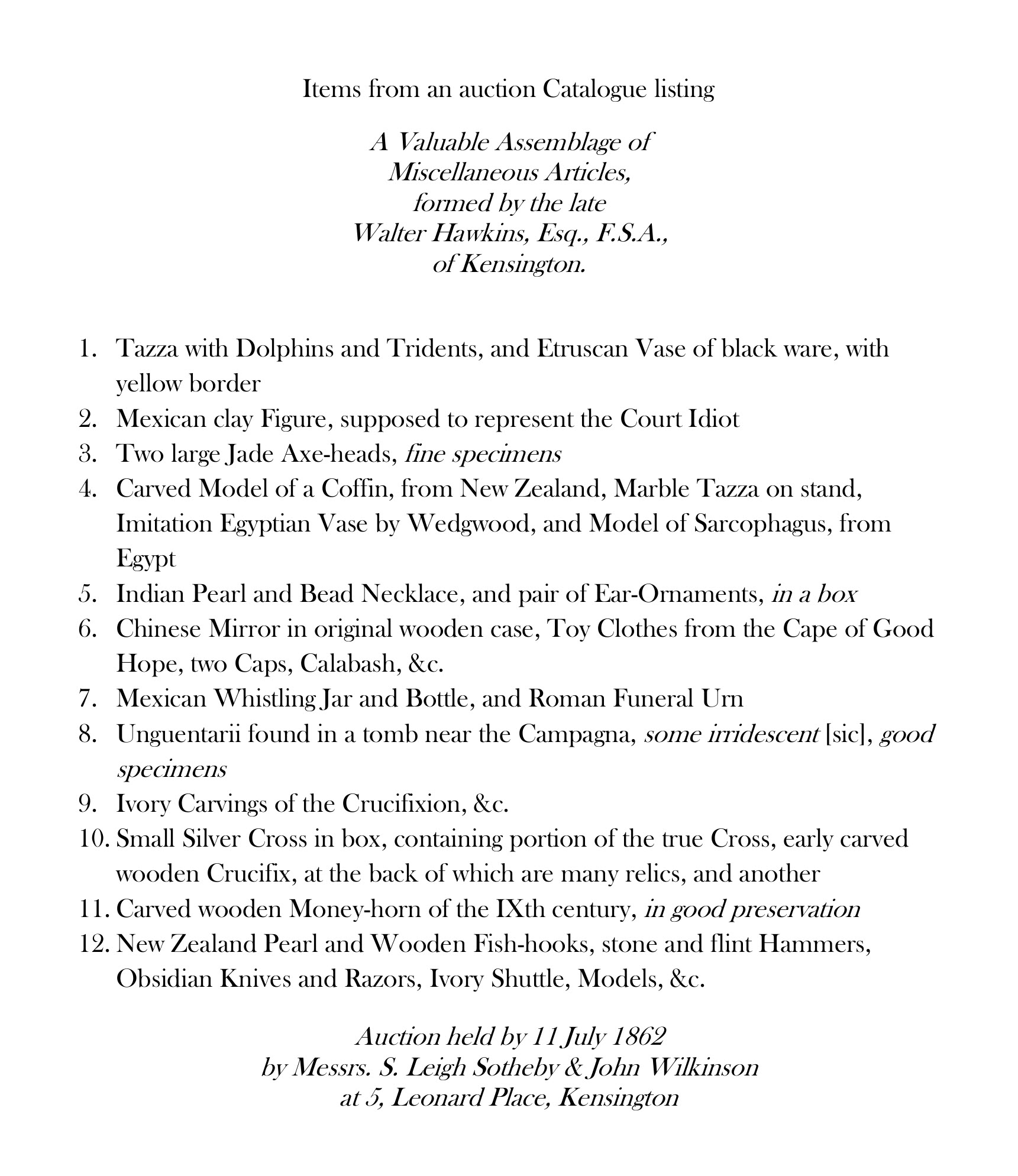
Front page of catalogue from auction on 11 July 1862, by Messrs. S. Leigh Sotheby & John Wilkinson.

In his will, dated 9 January 1849, Hawkins left various, books, paintings, etchings and other items to, among others, his three sisters (Charlotte, Mary and Sarah) and three nieces, one of whom (Lavinia Elizabeth Chapman Jones, younger daughter of Sarah) was besotted with the works of the self-styled prophetess Joanna Southcott.

Hawkins left his large collection of coins and medals to the United Services Institute in London. It is now the Royal United Services Institute for Defence & Security Studies (RUSI) in Whitehall. The RUSI Museum was housed in the Banqueting House, Whitehall but the collection was broken up when the government of the day regained full use of the Hall in the early 1960s. There seems to be no record of where items from the collection went. The lease on Hawkins's house, together with several items of furniture and “20 doz. of choice Madeira and other wines”, were auctioned in May 1862. About two months later, on 11 July 1862, Messrs. S. Leigh Sotheby & John Wilkinson auctioned “a valuable assemblage of miscellaneous articles of ancient, mediaeval and modern art, formed by the late Walter Hawkins, Esq., F.S.A. of Kensington.” The front page of the auction catalogue gives a good indication of the range of objects he had amassed, perhaps as a result of his ship broking activities.
