= Dunster Working Watermill =

Restored watermill in Dunster, England

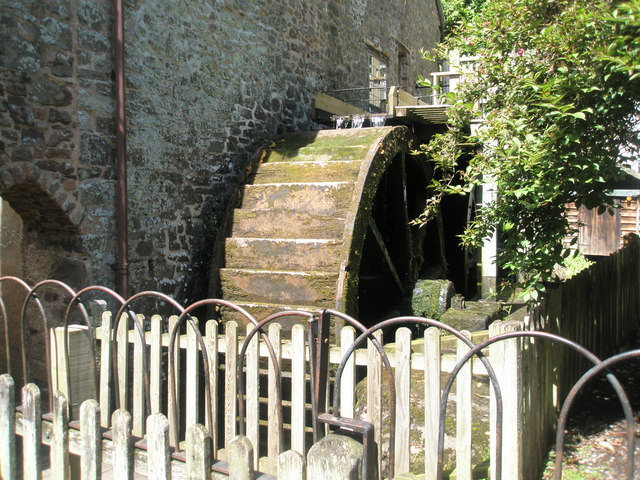
- Waterwheel

- Location within Somerset

General information
- Location: Dunster, England
- Coordinates: 51.18030°N 3.4449°W
- Construction started: 1779
- Completed: 1782

Dunster Working Watermill (also known as Castle Mill) is a restored 18th century watermill, situated on the River Avill, close to Gallox Bridge, in the grounds of Dunster Castle in Dunster, Somerset, England. It is a Grade II* listed building and within the Grade II* registered parkland of the castle.

The mill stands on a site where a mill was first recorded in the Domesday Book, but the present building was constructed around 1780. It closed in 1962 but was restored in 1979 and is still used to grind flour. The equipment is powered by two overshot wheels. It is owned and run by the National Trust.

== History ==
At the time of the Domesday Book in 1086 there were two mills in Dunster. One which was called the Lower Mill was on the site of the present mill. In the 17th century there were both malt and oats mills but by 1721 one of these had been converted to a fulling mill. The present mill, which was built around 1780 and replaced the two former mills. In 1940 a bakery was added. The mill ground corn until World War II and then animal feed until it closed in 1962.

It was restored to working order in 1979, winning a conservation award in 1982. The mill still produces Wheat, Rye and Spelt flour from organic grain. A cafe was opened in the buildings which used to be the wagon house and stables. Further restoration work, completed in 2007, was funded by the Exmoor Sustainable Development Fund.

It is owned by the National Trust and can be visited by National Trust members for free or by non-members buying an entry ticket. The site is visited by around 60,000 tourists a year and produces around 10 tonnes of flour each year. The second (Lower) waterwheel was replaced in 2015 and the associated machinery was refurbished and repaired in 2016. The 3 French burr millstones were dressed in 2024.

== Architecture and machinery ==
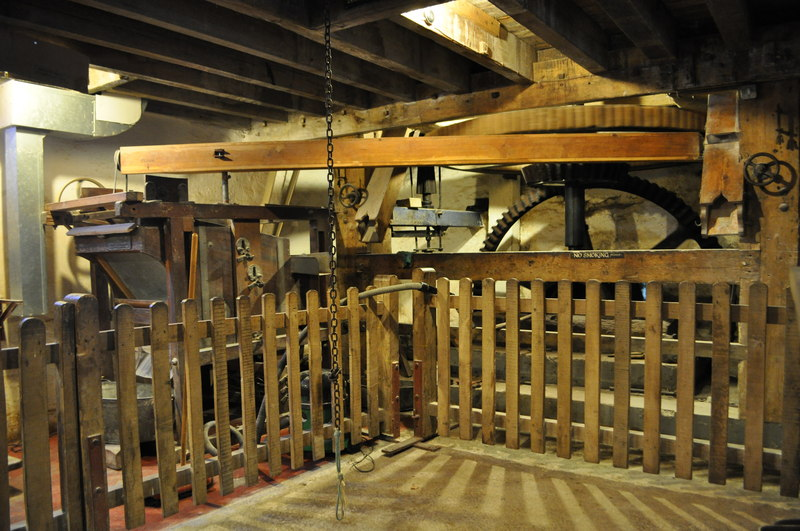
The pit wheel and spur wheel along with flour transporter and flour sieve.

The three-storey building has a slate roof. To the south east a stone wall contains wrought iron gates in an arched gateway.

The milling equipment is powered by a pair of overshot waterwheels, which transfer power to associated (internal) pit wheel, spur wheel and stone nut. This then drives the millstones. There are trapdoors on the first and second floors to allow grain to be hoisted up the building via the sack hoist.

== See also ==
- List of National Trust properties in Somerset
