= John Charles Ardagh =

British Army officer, surveyor and colonial administrator

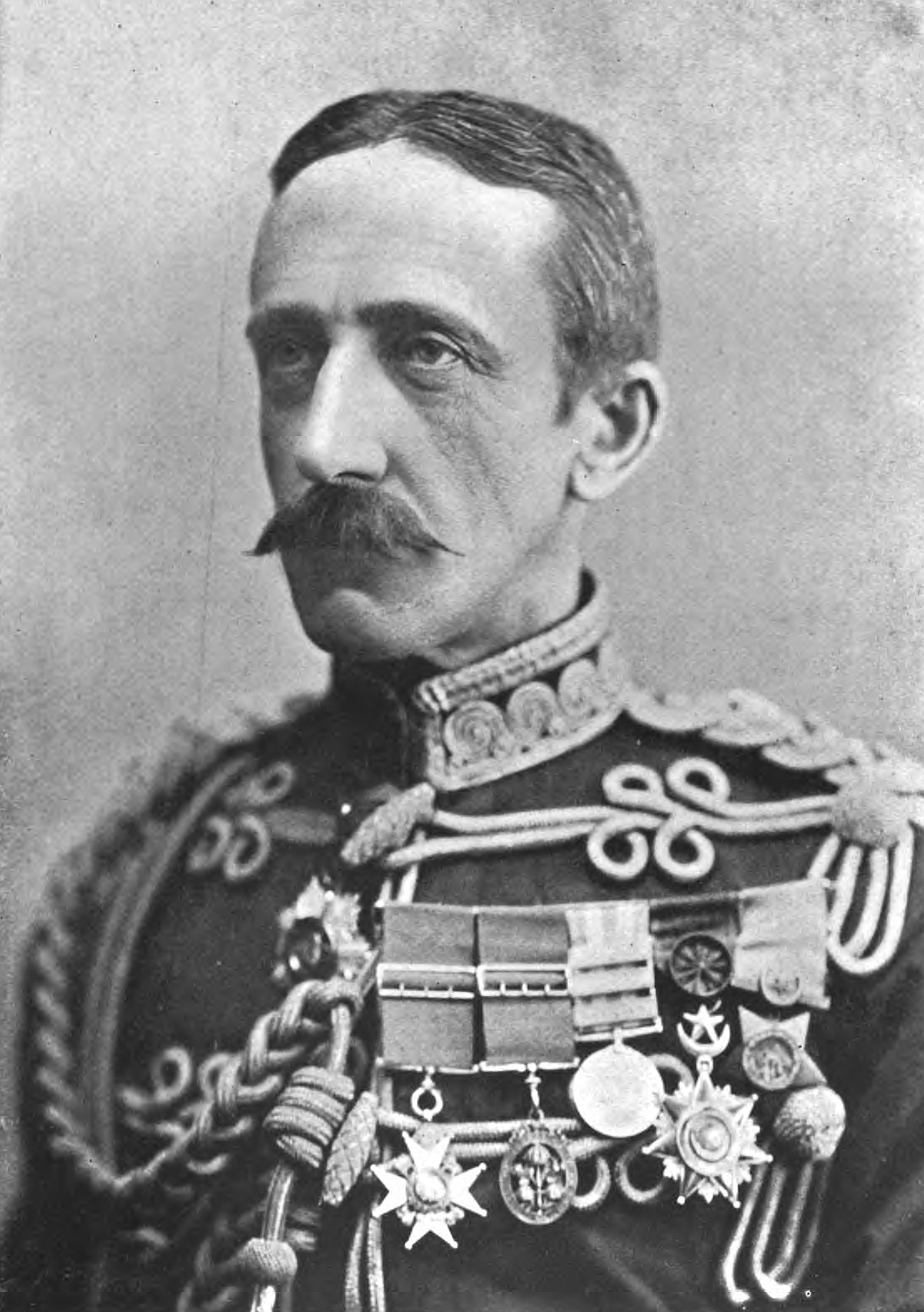
- Born: 9 August 1840; Rossmire, County Waterford
- Died: 30 September 1907 (aged 67); Glynllivon Park, Caernarfon
- Burial place: Church of St Mary & All Saints, Broomfield, near Taunton, Somerset
- Military career
- Allegiance: United Kingdom
- Branch: British Army
- Service years: 1859–1902
- Rank: Major general
- Unit: Royal Engineers
- Conflicts: Anglo-Egyptian War; Mahdist War; Second Boer War
- Awards: Knight Commander of the Order of St Michael and St George (1902); Knight Commander of the Order of the Indian Empire (1894); Companion of the Order of the Indian Empire (1892); Companion of the Bath (civil 1878 & military 1884); Egypt Medal (1884); Khedive's Star in Bronze (Egypt, 1884); Order of Osmanieh, 4th class (Ottoman Empire, 1884); Order of the Medjidieh, 3rd class (Ottoman Empire, 1885)

Major-General Sir John Charles Ardagh KCMG KCIE CB (9 August 1840 – 30 September 1907), was a British Army officer, surveyor and colonial administrator.

== Biography ==
=== Early life and education ===
Ardagh was the second son of Anglo-Irishman William Johnson Ardagh (1798-1872), vicar of Rossmire, County Waterford, and Sarah Cobbold, of Ipswich. After attending school at Waterford, in 1857 Ardagh entered Trinity College, Dublin, intending to follow his father into the church. He won a prize in Hebrew and honours in mathematics, but eventually decided on a military career, taking first place in the examinations to enter the Royal Military Academy at Woolwich in 1858, and receiving his commission as a lieutenant in the Royal Engineers, dated 1 April 1859.

=== Military engineer ===
After training at the Royal School of Military Engineering at Chatham, Ardagh supervised the construction of Fort Popton, one of the new defensive works at Milford Haven, built under the terms of the Defence Act of 1860.

Early in the American Civil War, when tensions between Britain and the United States where raised as a result of the Trent Affair of November 1861, Ardagh was sent to the colony of New Brunswick to construct a military telegraph line to the St. Lawrence river. He embarked on the transport ship Victoria at Queenstown, Ireland on 26 December 1861, but the ship was driven back to the port by storms. She sailed again on 13 February 1862, but was only saved from foundering by the exertions of Ardagh and his troops, which enabled her to reach Plymouth on 12 March. Ardagh's conduct was highly commended by the Commander-in-Chief, the Duke of Cambridge.

Ardagh was then placed in charge of the construction of Newhaven Fort. Rather than levelling the ground, Ardagh blended the fort into the contours of the land; it was also the first British fort built largely of concrete. Ardagh also designed an "Equilibrium Bridge" which was raised and lowered a drawbridge by means of counterweights. After further employment on other defence works, in April 1868 he was appointed secretary of Sir Frederick Grey's committee to report on the fortifications under construction, and in September 1869 he accompanied Sir William Jervois on a tour of inspection of the defence works at Halifax and Bermuda.

In February 1871, Ardagh witnessed German troops entering Paris following France's defeat in the Franco-Prussian War. Ardagh made a study of the defences of Paris, and later of Belfort and Strasbourg. He then spent three months in Malta, and a year at Chatham, before being promoted to captain on 3 August 1872. He attended the Staff College from February 1873, passing his final examinations in December 1874.

=== Military intelligence ===
In April 1875 he was attached to the intelligence branch of the War Office, and was in the Netherlands on intelligence duty in January and February 1876, and became a deputy assistant quartermaster-general for intelligence on 13 July.

In August 1876 Ardagh was sent on special service to the headquarters of the Turkish army during the war against Serbia. In October he was summoned to Constantinople to report on the defence of the city. In fifteen days he prepared sketch-surveys of nearly 150 square miles, and proved himself an expert in strategic geography. These surveys included the position of Buyuk-Chekmedje-Dere, with projects for the defence of the Dardanelles and the Bosphorus, the Bulair lines and Rodosto. The actual works were subsequently constructed by the Turks. Ardagh also reported to the Foreign Office on the Turkish operations during the conflicts in Herzegovina and Montenegro, and in December 1876 went to Tirnovo in Bulgaria to report on the state of the country. After recovering from an attack of fever, he resumed his duties at the War Office in April 1877, when he completed a report and survey begun in the previous year on the sea defences of the Lewes and Laughton Levels.

From December 1877 to March 1878 Ardagh was in Italy on special service for the Foreign Office, and then attended the Congress of Berlin as a technical military advisor to General Sir Lintorn Simmons. Ardagh's knowledge of the Turkish provinces proved of value, and in July he was made a Companion of the Bath (civil). Between September 1878 and September 1879 he was employed on the international commission to delineate the frontiers of Bulgaria. On 30 November 1878 he was gazetted a brevet major, and was finally promoted to major on 22 September 1880. On 3 June 1881 he was appointed British commissioner for the delimitation of the frontier between Turkey and Greece. In spite of obstacles the work was completed by the end of October.

==== Egyptian war ====
In February 1882 Ardagh was appointed instructor in military history, law, and tactics at the School of Military Engineering at Chatham, but on 5 July he was sent to Egypt, where he was occupied almost continuously for the next four years. His first duty was to place Alexandria in a state of defence after its bombardment by the British fleet and to take charge of the intelligence department there. Ardagh was employed in the railway administration at Ismailia, and was present at the actions at Kassassin and Tel-el-Mahuta, and at the battle of Tel-el-Kebir in September 1882. On 17 November 1882 he was appointed Deputy Assistant-Adjutant and Quartermaster-General, and was promoted to brevet lieutenant-colonel on 18 November 1882. He was mentioned in Lord Wolseley's despatch at the end of the campaign, and also received the British war medal with clasp for Tel-el-Kebir, the Khedive's bronze star, and the fourth class of the order of the Osmanieh.

Ardagh remained in Egypt with the British army of occupation, and was largely employed in making surveys. In July 1883 he returned home on leave, but returned to Egypt almost immediately after an out-break of cholera, and laboured untiringly during the epidemic.

In February 1884 Ardagh, as Commanding Royal Engineer and chief of the intelligence department, accompanied the British force under Sir Gerald Graham, which was sent from Cairo to the Eastern Sudan. He was present at the battle of El Teb on 29 February, and at the relief of Tokar on 1 March, he arranged the removal of 700 Egyptian inhabitants. By 8 March the change of base from Trinkitat to Suakin had been made, and on the 12th Ardagh reconnoitred with the mounted infantry the ground towards the hills. After the battle of Tamai on 13 March, the road was open to Berber, and Ardagh shared his general's opinion that an advance should then have been made to Berber to reach to General Gordon at Khartoum. He afterwards wrote : "Berber was then in the hands of an Egyptian garrison, and had we gone across, the subsequent operations for the attempted relief of General Gordon at Khartoum would not have been necessary." Graham's force returned to Cairo in April, leaving a battalion to garrison Suakin. Ardagh was mentioned in despatches and was made a Companion of the Bath (military) in May 1884.

In October 1884, when an expedition to relieve Khartoum was organised, Ardagh favoured an approach overland via Suakin and Berber, but the commander Lord Wolseley resolved to travel by boat up the Nile. Ardagh was appointed commandant at Cairo, with the grade of assistant adjutant-general. His energy, devotion, and quiet cheerfulness helped to expedite the fatal enterprise, and at the end of the disastrous campaign he was promoted to brevet colonel (25 August 1885), receiving the Order of the Medjidieh (3rd class). On 30 December, as chief staff officer of a combined British and Egyptian force, he took part in the battle of Ginnis, when a large army of the Khalifa, endeavouring to invade Egyptian territory, was defeated with great loss. For his services Ardagh was mentioned in despatches. On 17 December 1886 he was promoted to a regimental lieutenant-colonel, and on 26 January 1887 he was gazetted a colonel on the staff.

=== India ===
In November 1887, Ardagh returned to London as assistant adjutant-general for defence and mobilisation at the war office, and inaugurated schemes of mobilisation for over-seas service, and for local home defence. From April 1888 to 1893 he was aide-de-camp to the Commander-in-Chief of the Army. In October 1888 he became, with the permission of the War Office, private secretary to the Viceroy of India, the Marquis of Lansdowne. Apart for a period of absence through illness in 1892, he remained with Lord Lansdowne through his term of office. He returned to England in May 1894, after serving briefly under Lansdowne's successor, Lord Elgin. He was made a Companion of the Order of the Indian Empire in 1892, and a Knight Commander of the Order of the Indian Empire in 1894.

=== South African War ===
Ardagh served as commandant of the School of Military Engineering at Chatham from April 1895 until April 1896, when he returned to the War Office to serve as Director of Military Intelligence. He was promoted to major-general on 14 March 1898.

On the outbreak of the South African War in October 1899, Ardagh's department was criticized for providing poor intelligence on the military strength and preparations the Boers had made for war. In response, Ardagh, in spite of a limited staff and inadequate funds, compiled a full statement of the numbers and military resources of the Boer forces, estimating that the defence of the British colonies would require 40,000 men, while to carry the war into the enemy's country would require 200,000. Copies of this report were eventually laid before both houses of parliament at Ardagh's request. Meanwhile a copy of Military Notes on the Dutch Republic, a study prepared in secret by Ardagh's intelligence branch, fell into the hands of the Boers after the Battle of Talana Hill on 20 October 1899, and was later published. These documents, which were corroborated by evidence laid before the royal commission after the war, absolved Ardagh of all blame.

=== Later career and death ===
In addition to his ordinary duties Ardagh was also a member of a committee on submarine telegraph cables, and in 1899 served as military technical adviser to the British delegates, Sir Julian Pauncefote and Sir Henry Howard, to the First Hague Conference. There he took a leading part in drawing up the Rules respecting the Laws and Customs of War on Land.

After leaving the War Office in March 1901 he served as British agent before a commission to investigate the claims of foreign powers on account of the deportation to Europe of subjects of theirs domiciled in South Africa during the war. From October 1901 he was a member of the British tribunal to arbitrate the Chile-Argentina boundary dispute and helped to draft the final settlement. From December 1901 to May 1902 he was in South Africa settling miscellaneous claims in connection with the war, which was still going on. He returned to South Africa later in the year with the temporary rank of lieutenant-general as member of the royal commission for the revision of martial law sentences.

On 9 August 1902, at the age of 62, Ardagh was placed on half-pay and retired from active military service, but was still employed by the Foreign Office. He succeeded Lord Pauncefote on the Permanent Court of Arbitration at the Hague, and was appointed by the British government as a director of the Suez Canal Company. In December 1902 he was created a Knight Commander of the Order of St Michael and St George (KCMG) for his service to the Chile-Argentina tribunal, and he was invested with the insignia by King Edward VII at Buckingham Palace on 18 December 1902.

Ardagh also served as a member of council of the British Red Cross Society from 1905, representing the British Army, and in June 1906 was one of four delegates of the British government, at the conference held by the Swiss government for the revision of the Geneva Convention of 1864. His last public duty was to act as a delegate of the central committee of the British Red Cross Society at the Eighth International Conference in London in June 1907, after which he received the Red Cross Commemoration Medal for his services during the Russo-Japanese War from the Empress Marie Feodorovna of Russia.

Ardagh died on 30 September 1907 at Glynllivon Park, Carnarvon, and is buried at the Church of St Mary & All Saints, Broomfield, near Taunton, Somerset.

== Personal life ==
On 18 February 1896, Ardagh married Susan, the widow of the 3rd Earl of Malmesbury and the daughter of John Hamilton of Fyne Court, Somerset.

In addition to his military activities, Ardagh served on the council of the Royal Geographical Society, was an associate of the Institution of Civil Engineers, and was a member of the Royal Society's Geodetic Arc Committee in 1900. He was made an honorary Legum Doctor by Trinity College, Dublin, in 1897. In October 1894, he published an article on British rule in Egypt in the Quarterly Review, and contributed occasionally to other periodicals. He was also a skilled artist, and 140 of his water-colour drawings were presented by his wife to the Royal Engineers Institute at Chatham. A biography, also written by his wife, was published in 1909.

== Publications ==
- Notes on the defence of Egypt from the southward. London: Harrison & Sons. 1884.
- The growth of our Indian frontiers. London: Military Society of Ireland. 1894.

Military offices
Preceded by Edward Chapman	Director of Military Intelligence; 1896–1901	Succeeded by William Nicholson (As Director General of Mobilisation and Military Intelligence)
