= Henry Neele =

English poet

Henry Neele (29 January 1798 – 7 February 1828) was an English poet and literary scholar. He was also a practising attorney in the West End of London.

== Early life ==
Neele was the son of Samuel John Neele (1758–1824), a cartographer, engraver, and copperplate and printer, who had his business in the Strand, London. The family soon moved to Kentish Town, where he was brought up and educated. He had at least one brother, Josiah Neele (fl. 1826–45), who was to follow in his father's trade. At school and in later life, Neele acquired a good knowledge of French and some German and Italian, but little Latin or Greek.

== Law ==
On leaving school, Neele was articled to an attorney, and after qualifying, practised in Great Blenheim Street (now Ramillies Street) in the West End of London. Barbara Hofland relates that he "enjoyed a respectable share of business in that profession, up to the time of his death; being remarkable for his great regularity in the dispatch of all concerns committed to his care, and for the soundness and comprehensiveness of his views in cases committed to his examination."

== Popular contributor ==
Neele began publishing (anonymously) in the Monthly Magazine in 1814. His first volume, Odes and Other Poems, was published in 1817 at his father's expense, but attracted the attention of Dr Nathan Drake. A second edition appeared in July 1820. This was followed in March 1823 by his Poems, Dramatic and Miscellaneous, inscribed to the Scottish poet Joanna Baillie, which was reviewed extensively in The British Magazine of that year and had considerable success. As a result, he became a popular contributor to magazines and annuals for the rest of his short life.

Neele delivered lectures on Shakespeare at the age of twenty and produced an edition of The Tempest in 1824, as the start of an edition of the complete works of Shakespeare, although this was aborted by its publisher after poor sales. Neele also gave lectures on the history of English poetry in 1826–27 at the Russell Institution and repeated these at the Western Literary and Scientific Institution in Whitcomb Street.

== Critical of Metaphysicals ==
Like many commentators in that period, Neele was critical of the Metaphysical Poets. Donne's "beauties of thought and diction", he wrote, "are so overloaded with far-fetched conceits and quaintnesses... that there is now very little probability of his ever regaining the popularity which he has lost." The lectures were published posthumously. The collection included the hymn "O Thou! Who sittest enthroned on high."

Neele's three-volume Romance of History (1827) is a collection of tales illustrating English history. It was popular in its time, but marred, according to the philologist Richard Garnett by a "curious dialect that was then considered to represent mediaeval English."

== Suicide ==
Neele was described as "short of stature and of appearance rather humble and unprepossessing, but his large expanse of forehead and the fire of his eye betokened mind and imagination." Following a period of overwork, he is said to have become confused and deranged about nine days before he committed suicide at home in Marylebone by slitting his own throat on 7 February 1828. He left a widow, Jemima Mary Anne.

== External resources ==
- A poem by Neele on autumn and mortality: Retrieved 12 August 2012.
- To Despair – an ode on the character Despair in Spenser's The Faerie Queene: Retrieved 12 August 2012.
- 1823 edition of Poems, Dramatic and Miscellaneous online in full: Retrieved 12 August 2012.
- 1827 edition of Vol. II of Poems by Henry Neele, Esq., Volume online in full: Retrieved 12 August 2012.
- 1828 edition of The Romance of History. England online in full: Retrieved 12 August 2012.
- 1829 American edition of The Literary Remains of the Late Henry Neele online in full: Retrieved 12 August 2012.
- 1830 edition of The Tales of the Late Henry Neele online in full: Retrieved 12 August 2012.
