= Andrew Crosse =

British amateur scientist (1784–1855)

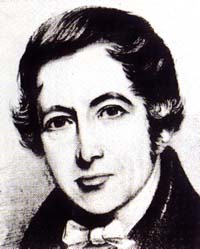
- Andrew Crosse
- Born: 17 July 1784; Fyne Court, Broomfield, Somerset, UK
- Died: 6 July 1855 (aged 70); Fyne Court, Broomfield, Somerset, UK
- Occupation: Scientist
- Known for: Electrocrystallization; atmospheric electricity
- Spouses: Mary Anne Hamilton (m. 1809; died 1846) Cornelia Augusta Hewett Berkeley (m. 1850)
- Children: 10

Andrew Crosse (17 June 1784 – 6 July 1855) was a British scientist who was born and died at Fyne Court, Broomfield, Somerset. Crosse was an early pioneer and experimenter in the use of electricity. He became known after press reports of an electrocrystallization experiment he conducted in 1836, during which insects "appeared".

== Early life ==
Crosse was the first son of Richard Crosse and Susannah Porter. In 1788 he accompanied them on a trip to France, where he went to school for a time in Orléans. From the age of six until he was eight he stayed with a tutor, the Reverend Mr White, in Dorchester, where he learned Greek. On 1 February 1792 he was sent to boarding school in Bristol.

Around the age of 12, Crosse persuaded one of his teachers to let him attend a series of lectures on the natural sciences, the second of which was on the subject of electricity. This was the cause of his lifelong interest in the subject. Crosse first began experimenting with electricity during his time in the sixth form, when he built a Leyden jar. After leaving school, he studied at Brasenose College, Oxford.

== Scientific research ==
Having lost his parents, his father in 1800 and his mother in 1805, Crosse took over the management of the family estates at the age of 21. After abandoning his studies for the Bar, he increasingly devoted his spare time to studying electricity at Fyne Court, where he built his own laboratory. He also studied mineralogy and became interested in the formation of crystalline deposits in caves. Around 1807, he began to experiment with electrocrystallization, forming crystalline lime carbonate from water taken from Holwell Cavern. He returned to the subject again from around 1817 and in subsequent years produced a total of 24 electrocrystallised minerals.

Among his experiments Crosse erected "an extensive apparatus for examining the electricity of the atmosphere," incorporating at one point an insulated wire some 1.25 miles (2.01 km) long, later shortened to 1,800 feet (550 m), suspended from poles and trees. Using this wire he was able to determine the polarity of the atmosphere under various weather conditions. His results were published by his friend George Singer in 1814, as part of Singer's Elements of Electricity and Electro-Chemistry.

Along with Sir Humphry Davy (who visited Fyne Court in 1827), Crosse was one of the first to develop large voltaic piles. Although it was not the largest he built, Henry Minchin Noad's Manual of Electricity describes a battery consisting of 50 jars containing 73 square feet (6.8 m^{2}) of coated surface. Using his wires Crosse was able to charge and discharge it some 20 times a minute, "accompanied by reports almost as loud as those of a cannon". He became known locally as "the thunder and lightning man". In 1836, Sir Richard Phillips described seeing a wide variety of voltaic piles at Fyne Court, totalling 2,500, of which 1,500 were in use when he visited.

In 1836, Crosse was persuaded to attend a meeting of the British Association for the Advancement of Science in Bristol. After describing his discoveries over dinner at the house of a friend in Bristol, he was further persuaded to recount them to both the chemical and the geological sections of the meeting. They included his electrocrystallization and atmospheric experiments, and his improvements to the voltaic battery.

Crosse went on to separate copper from its ores using electrolysis, experimented with the electrolysis of sea water, wine and brandy to purify them, and examined the effects of electricity on vegetation. He was also interested in the practical uses of electricity and magnetism, including the development of loudspeakers and telegraphy although he did not do research in these areas himself.

=== Controversy ===
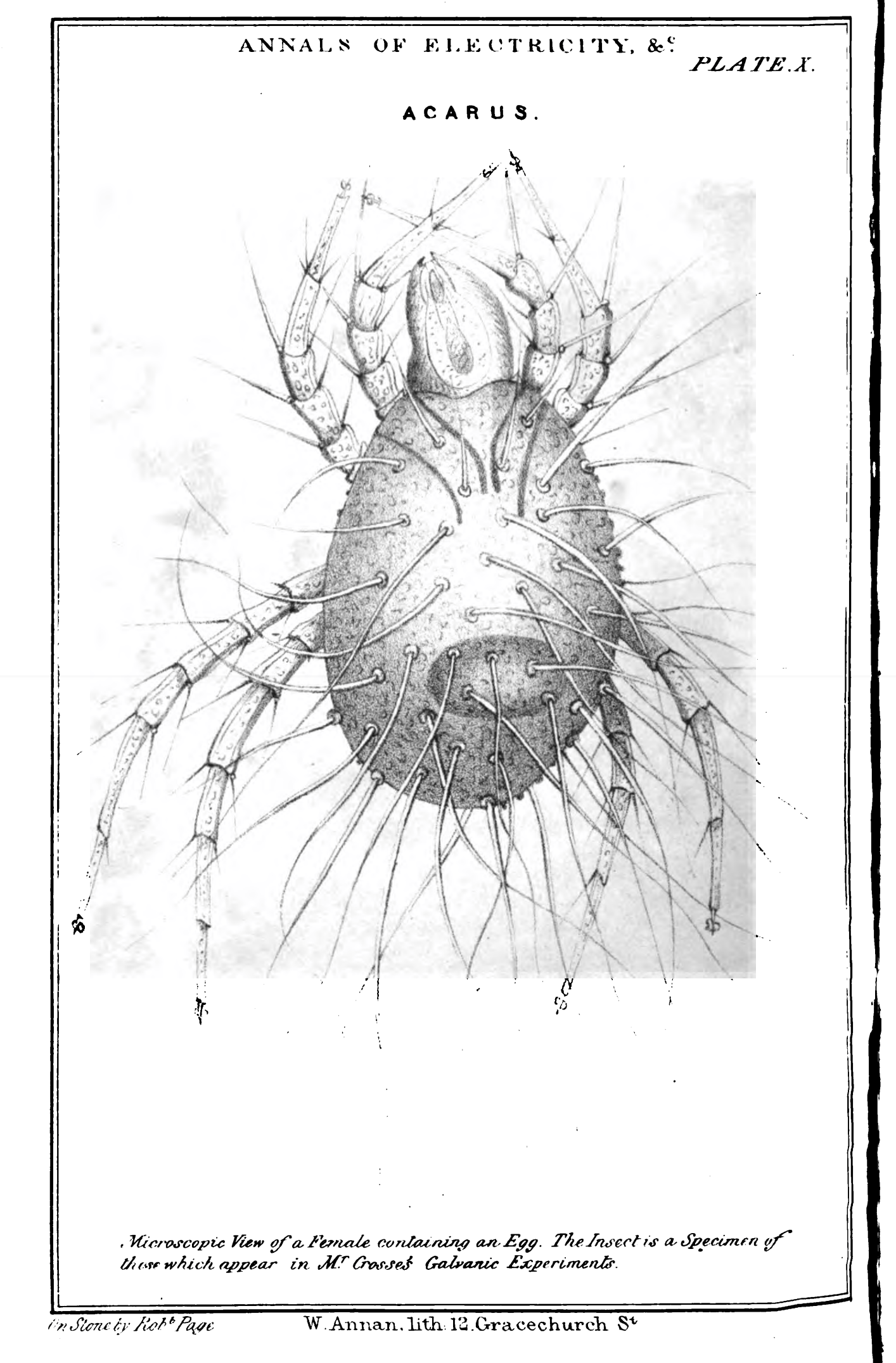
Acarus crossii

A few months after the meeting of the British Association for the Advancement of Science Crosse was conducting another electrocrystallization experiment when, on the 26th day of the experiment, he saw what he described as "the perfect insect, standing erect on a few bristles which formed its tail". More creatures appeared and two days later they began moving their legs. Over the next few weeks hundreds more appeared. They crawled around the table and hid themselves wherever they could find shelter. Crosse identified them as being members of the genus Acarus.

Puzzled, Crosse mentioned the incident to a couple of friends. A local newspaper learned of the incident and published an article about the "extraordinary experiment," naming the insects Acarus crossii. The article was subsequently picked up by other newspapers across the country and elsewhere in Europe. Some readers apparently gained the impression that Crosse had somehow "created" the insects, or at least claimed to have done so. He received angry letters in which he was accused of blasphemy and trying to take God's place as a creator. Some of them included death threats.

Other scientists tried to repeat the experiment. W. H. Weeks took extensive measures to assure a sealed environment by placing his experiment inside a bell jar. He obtained the same results as Crosse, but due to the controversy that Crosse's experiment had sparked, his work was never published. In February 1837 many newspapers reported that Michael Faraday had also replicated Crosse's results. However, this was not true. Faraday had not even attempted the experiment. Later researchers, such as fellow members of the London Electrical Society Henry Noad and Alfred Smee, were unable to replicate Crosse's results.

Crosse did not claim that he had created the arthropods. He assumed that there were insect or arachnid eggs embedded in his samples. Later commentators agreed that the arachnids -since the Acarus genus are arachnids- were probably cheese mites or dust mites that had contaminated Crosse's instruments.

It has been suggested that this episode was a source of inspiration for Mary Shelley's novel Frankenstein, but this cannot have been the case, since Crosse's experiments took place almost 20 years after the novel was first published. The idea appears to have originated in the book The Man Who Was Frankenstein (1979) by Peter Haining. Mary Shelley did, however, know Crosse through a mutual friend, the poet Robert Southey. Percy Bysshe Shelley and Mary Shelley reportedly attended a lecture by Crosse in London in December 1814, in which he allegedly explained his experiments with atmospheric electricity. However, Mary Shelley's diary speaks only of "Garnerin" as the lecturer. Similarly dubious is a claim that Edward W. Cox wrote a report of their visits to Fyne Court to see Crosse's work in the Taunton Courier in Autumn 1836. Percy had been dead for over a dozen years by then.

== Other interests ==
Crosse also wrote a great many poems and enjoyed walking on the Quantock Hills, in which Fyne Court is set, "at all hours of day and night, in all seasons".

Crosse advocated the benefits of education for the lower classes, argued against emigration, and supported a campaign by local farmers against falling food prices and high taxes during the 1820s. He was also active in party politics, speaking in support of friends at election meetings. Following the Battle of Waterloo Crosse boarded a ship at Exeter to see the captured Napoleon Bonaparte on the deck of HMS Bellerophon near Plymouth. Crosse also served as a magistrate.

== Personal life ==
Crosse married Mary Anne Hamilton in 1809. They had seven children, although three died in childhood. Mary died in 1846 following several years of ill health.

On 22 July 1850 Crosse married again, aged 66. His second wife was the 23-year-old Cornelia Augusta Hewett Berkeley. They went on to have three children.

Crosse suffered a stroke while dressing on the morning on 26 May 1855. He died on 6 July 1855, in the same room in which he had been born.

The Italian writer Dacia Maraini is his great-great-granddaughter, the socialite Cornelia Edith "Yoï" Crosse being his granddaughter and her grandmother.

== Memorial ==
The laboratory table on which Crosse carried out experiments stands in the aisle of the Church of St Mary & All Saints, Broomfield, and an obelisk in his memory is in the churchyard.

Crosse's home, Fyne Court, was largely destroyed by fire in 1894. The garden and the 65-acre (260,000 m^{2}) estate are now owned by the National Trust, and are open to visitors.

== Documents ==
A number of documents related to Andrew Crosse and his work are held in the Somerset Record Office. In December 2008, Somerset County Council acquired a further two letters for the sum of 400 pounds to add to the collection.
