= Beard tax =

Excise tax levied on facial hair

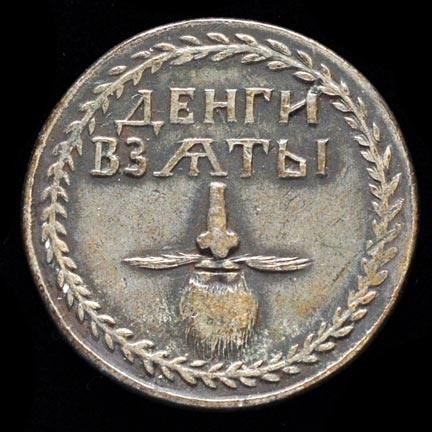
A Russian beard token from 1705, carried to indicate that the owner had paid the beard tax imposed by Peter the Great

A beard tax is a governmental policy that requires men to pay for the privilege of wearing a beard. The most well documented beard tax was in place in Russia during the 18th century.

== Russia ==
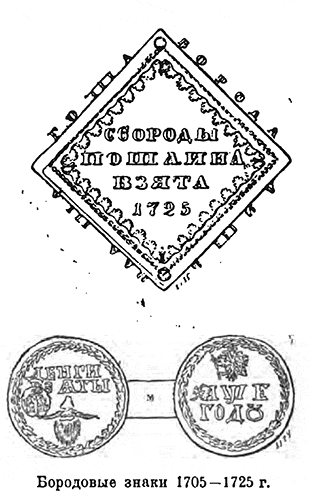
Beard tokens (1725 version above; 1705 version below)

In 1698, Tsar Peter I of Russia instituted a beard tax as part of an effort to bring Russian society in line with Western European models. To enforce the ban on beards, the tsar empowered police to forcibly and publicly shave those who refused to pay the tax. Resistance to going clean shaven was widespread with many believing that it was a religious requirement for a man to wear a beard, at the time Russians considered the beard tax itself to be a sin.

The tax levied depended upon the status of the bearded man: those associated with the Imperial Court, military, or government were charged 60 rubles annually; (Note: The rubles under Peter the Great contained 312.1 grains of silver, so 60 rubles represented about 925 grams (two pounds) of pure silver and 100 rubles represented about 1.5 kg of pure silver. Two half-kopeks was one-hundredth of one ruble, or the equivalent of 15 grams (half an ounce) of silver.) wealthy merchants were charged 100 rubles per year while other merchants and townsfolk were charged 60 rubles per year; Muscovites were charged 30 rubles per year; and peasants were charged two half-kopeks every time they entered a city.

The tax raised an average of 3,588 rubles annually from 1705 to 1708. However, from a financial standpoint, the tax was unsuccessful due both to the relatively low number of people unwilling to shave their beards and an overestimation of the ability of the Russian state to administer and collect the tax. In 1772, the tax was formally repealed by Catherine the Great.

=== Beard token ===
Those who paid the tax were required to carry a "beard token" (Russian: Бородовой знак) or "beard kopek" (бородовая копейка). This was a copper or silver token with a Russian Eagle on the reverse and on the obverse the lower part of a face with nose, mouth, whiskers, and beard. Several versions were minted between the issuance of the decree and its lifting in 1772. The first token minted in 1698 or 1699 was a simple copper penny of which only two specimens have been found. It was followed by the more common round, copper token minted in 1705 and again in 1710. A rhomboid version was issued in 1724 and 1725. Walter Hawkins published a paper in 1845 illustrating an example of the token from his own collection and describing the history of the tax in Russia.

The 1699 and 1705 versions were inscribed with the words "money taken" (ДЕНГИ ВЗѦТЫ) on the obverse, and the date in Cyrillic numerals (҂АѰЕ ГОДꙊ, "Year 1705") on the reverse of the 1705 token; the 1710 version was largely the same with an updated date (҂АѰІ, "1710"). The rhomboid version of 1724/1725 was smooth on the reverse with the phrase "beard tax taken" (СБОРОДЫ ПОШЛИНА ВЗЯТА) on the obverse and "the beard is a superfluous burden" (БОРОДА ЛИШЬНАѦ ТѦГОТА) on the edge. The date on the later tokens was written in Arabic numerals.

== England ==
A persistent legend claims that King Henry VIII of England, who wore a beard himself, introduced a tax on beards, and that his eventual successor Elizabeth I tried unsuccessfully to increase the tax. Contemporary documentation of the Tudor beard tax is lacking, and The National Archives has no record of such a tax having been instituted.

== France ==
The bearded Francis I of France received approval from the pope in the early 1500s to levy a tax on priests' beards in part to fund his wars with the Holy Roman Empire. This led to a divide between the wealthier court ecclesiastics who could afford the tax and poorer village priests who could not.

== Yemen ==
In 1936, the Kingdom of Yemen introduced a "no-beard tax", which meant men who were clean-shaven had to pay a tax in lieu of growing a beard. This policy differed from the approach taken in other Islamic nations where tradition and sharia law have been used to require the growing of beards under threat of punishment.

== See also ==
- Beard and haircut laws by country
- Poll tax
- Sumptuary law
- Ear and nose taxes
