= Ear and nose taxes =

Taxes in the 1920s in Tibet

The ear tax and the nose tax were introduced temporarily in the 1920s to support military needs in the state of Tibet under the rule of the 13th Dalai Lama. Tibet faced financial challenges due to several factors, including geopolitical tensions and the need to modernize the military. In response to these problems, the Tibetan government imposed unique taxes on certain body parts, particularly ears and noses. These taxes were imposed on males, and payment was typically made in silver coins.

The ear and nose taxes were primarily symbolic, intended to demonstrate the Tibetan people's loyalty and support for the government's military efforts. While the exact details may differ in different accounts, these taxes were meant to illustrate that everyone, even those who couldn't contribute significantly, had a role in maintaining Tibet's defense and security.

== Versions ==
Although the existence of these taxes is repeatedly mentioned by Chinese and Western authors, the information provided is somewhat contradictory. For example, Chinese researchers claim that households paid one liang of silver for each ear of a person or animal. Contemporary American researchers reported that no tax was levied on severed ears, which may have resulted from cosmetic surgery or punishment. A later British publication, citing Chinese correspondent Chin Fu-Jen, described how individuals who didn't pay the ear tax were punished by having their ears removed.

The Western press also noted that the following year (1927), the Dalai Lama Thupten Gyatso introduced a per capita tax based on nose size, with individuals with long noses paying two to three times more than those with snub noses.

Anna Louise Strong also mentioned taxes on women with braided hair consisting of two plaits.

== See also ==
- Beard tax
- Serfdom in Tibet controversy
- Tax on childlessness
