= Russell Institution =

Coordinates: 51°31′27.08″N 0°7′33.95″W

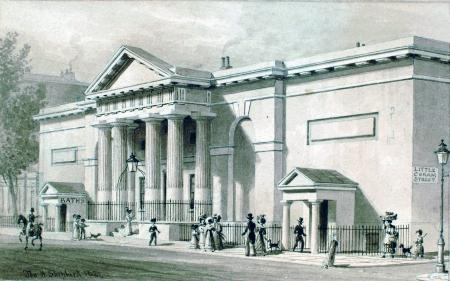
The Russell Institution building, Great Coram Street, 1827

The Russell Institution (fuller titles: Russell Institution for the Promotion of Literary and Scientific Knowledge, and the Russell Literary and Scientific Institution) was an organisation devoted to scientific, literary and musical education, based in London. It was founded by private subscription in 1808, taking as models the Royal Institution and the London Institution, both at the time popular.

== History ==
The Institution was formed, somewhat opportunistically, to provide a revenue-paying purpose for an assembly hall which had been constructed in Coram Street, north of new housing around Bloomsbury Square. Previous ventures at the building having failed, the proprietors "thought it expedient" to imitate the model of the Royal and London Institutions; to that end they organised a meeting of local residents, seeking 12,500 guineas at 25 guineas each from 500 subscribers. The objects of the Institution were the "gradual formation of a library, consisting of the most useful works in ancient and modern literature; the establishment of a reading room provided with the best foreign and English journals, and the periodical publications, and lectures on literary and scientific subjects. The books in the library will be circulated for reading among the proprietors."

The institution proper was in being by June 1808, 2,700 guineas being spent to purchase the premises and some 4,500 guineas on equipping a library and providing a stock of books. Two or three courses of scientific lectures were given per annum. In order to fund the institution's ongoing expenses and provide some guarantee of stability, subscribers paid a guinea per annum. The Institution was relatively long-lived; periodic mentions of it are found in the literature, such as a report of 1851 lectures there by Charles Richard Weld; an observation in Frederick Miller's 1874 St Pancras – Past and Present noting that some of the premises had been given over to a wine merchant, but that the library continued to receive daily papers, and monthly and annual journals. The Institution survived until near the end of the century; the Post Office listed it in an 1881 directory, but it is found missing in the 1891 counterpart.

== Staff ==
Edward Wedlake Brayley was secretary and librarian of the Institution from 1825 to 1854. Amongst those who lectured at the Russell Institute were:

- John Thomas Cooper (1790–1854), chemist
- William Hazlitt (1778–1830), writer and painter
- Joseph Kemp (1778–1824), organist and composer
- George Singer (1786–1817), electrical researcher
- Henry Neele (1798–1828), poet and literary historian

== See also ==
The Russell Institution was one of four such organisations in London in the early nineteenth century; its models were the Royal Institution and the London Institution; the other was:

- The Surrey Institution
