= Samuel Weller Singer =

18th/19th-century English Shakespearean scholar

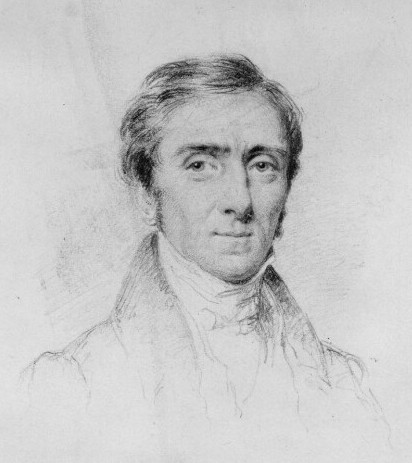
An 1831 drawing of Singer by Eden Upton Eddis

Samuel Weller Singer (1783–1858) was an English author and scholar on the work of William Shakespeare. He is also now remembered as a pioneer historian of card games.

== Life ==
Born in London, he was son of Thomas Singer, a feather and artificial-flower maker, who carried on business in Princes Street, Cavendish Square. George John Singer was his younger brother. His father died when Samuel was ten years old, and his mother, whose maiden name was Elizabeth Weller, continued the feather and flower business. Samuel attended a day school kept by a Frenchwoman, and acquired facility in French. As a boy he read widely, and taught himself Italian. At an early age he was apprenticed to a hatter, but the indentures were cancelled. His mother then employed him, and about 1808 he set up for himself in the same trade in Duke Street, St. James's, though without success. He then opened a bookseller's shop in St. James's Street: collectors such as Heber, Grenville, and Francis Douce were among his customers, and Douce became a lifelong friend.

With bookselling he combined literary work. In 1815 Singer gave up his shop and began to write full-time. Leaving London, he settled first at Bushey, Hertfordshire, and later at Boxhall. Robert Triphook, the antiquarian publisher, and Charles Whittingham, owner of the Chiswick Press, gave him employment. Singer was elected a Fellow of the Society of Antiquaries in 1825, but in 1827 his literary activity was checked by his acceptance of the office of librarian to the Royal Institution in Albemarle Street. He retained the post till 1835. A year earlier his friend Francis Douce had died, and left him a legacy. Singer finally retired in 1835 to Mickleham, Surrey. He died suddenly at Mickleham on 20 December 1858, and was buried there.

He had married, in 1808, Miss Harriet Robinson, by whom he was father of a son, Alfred (1816–1898), and three daughters. His library, which included many Italian books, was sold by auction in 1860.

== Works ==
In 1811 he prepared for private circulation a limited edition of a reprint of Fénelon's 'Deux Dialogues sur la Peinture,' with a preface in French. There followed similar editions of 'Lionora de' Bardi ed Hippolito Buondelmonte' (1813), 'Novelle Scelte Rarissime stampate a spese di XL Amatori' (1814), and 'Baliverneries ou Contes nouveaux d'Eutrapel' (1815). In 1812, too, he entered into literary controversy by printing for private distribution 'Some Account of the Book printed at Oxford in mcccclxviii under the title Exposicio sancti Jeronimi in simbolo apostolorum' (London). Here Singer displayed bibliographical knowledge, but Rufinus's Latin treatise on the Apostles' Creed was published at Oxford in 1478, and not, as Singer maintained, in 1468; the earlier date in the colophon was a misprint. Singer later called in as many copies of his tract as he could. He finally recanted his original opinion in Leigh Sotheby's 'Principia Typographica,' iii. 19.

For Triphook he edited a series of reprints of sixteenth-century English literature. These included

- Sir John Harington's 'Metamorphosis of Ajax' (1814);
- 'Shakespeare's Jest Book' (3 parts, 1814–15);
- William Roper's 'Life of More' (1817);
- poems by Richard Lovelace (1817), George Chapman (1818), Thomas Lodge, Shakerley Marmion, John Chalkhill, and Christopher Marlowe (all in 1820), and Joseph Hall's 'Satires' (1824), as well as James Puckle's 'Club' (1834).

Other poems reproduced by Singer in his early days were Bartholomew Griffin's 'Fidessa' (1815), Edward Fairfax's 'Tasso' (1817, 2 vols.), and Henry Constable's 'Diana' (1818, in facsimile). In 1815 he prepared from the Lambeth manuscripts the first complete edition of the life of Thomas Wolsey by George Cavendish (2nd ed. 1827).

His 'Researches into the History of Playing Cards; with Illustrations of the Origin of Printing and Engraving on Wood' was published in 1816; two hundred and fifty copies were printed. It was superseded by the 'Playing Cards of Various Ages and Countries,' published in three volumes (1892–95) by Lady Charlotte Elizabeth Schreiber. In 1820 Singer printed for the first time a full transcript of the 'Anecdotes of Joseph Spence', the manuscript of which he found among Spence's papers. An incomplete edition prepared by Edmond Malone was published independently on the same day as Singer's fuller version, which was reprinted in 1859. In 1823 he printed for the first time Sir Philip Sidney's paraphrase of the Psalms. In 1828 he made a contribution to historical literature in 'The Correspondence of Henry Hyde, earl of Clarendon, and of his brother Lawrence Hyde, earl of Rochester, with the Diary of Lord Clarendon, 1687–1690, and the Diary of Lord Rochester; published for the greater part for the first time from the original MSS.' The manuscripts belonged to Singer's friend William Upcott.

A popular venture was an edition of Shakespeare in ten volumes, which Singer undertook for Whittingham; it was issued by the Chiswick Press in 1826. Singer was responsible for a collation of the text and many notes. A life was contributed by Dr. Charles Symmons, and there were wood engravings after the designs of Stothard and others. The edition was frequently republished.. A reissue in 1856 included a series of critical essays by Singer's friend, William Watkiss Lloyd. Singer made the earliest attack on the genuineness of John Payne Collier's manuscript corrections in the so-called Perkins folio. The work appeared in 1853 as the 'Text of Shakespeare vindicated from the Interpolations and Corruptions advocated by J. P. Collier in his Notes and Emendations.’

Meanwhile Singer had studied Anglo-Saxon and Norman-French, and began the compilation of an Anglo-Saxon dictionary. He abandoned the project on learning that Joseph Bosworth was engaged on a similar undertaking. He issued adverse critical 'Remarks on the Glossary [by Sir Frederic Madden] of Havelock the Dane' (1829), to which Madden replied. He also printed, with an English translation, 'The Departing Soul's Address to the Body, a fragment of a semi-Saxon Poem discovered among the Archives of Worcester Cathedral by Sir Thomas Phillipps' (1845).

He edited Robert Herrick's 'Poetical Works' (1846), Francis Bacon's 'Essays' (1856), and John Selden's 'Table Talk' (1847; 2nd edit. 1856). He translated Martin Luther's 'Way to Prayer' (1846), and (with original additions) 'Wayland Smith' from the French of G. P. Depping and Francisque Michel (1847).
