= John Peter Gassiot =

English businessman and amateur scientist

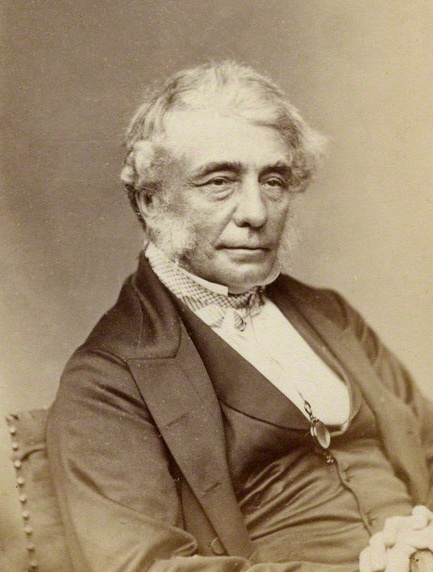
John Peter Gassiot.

John Peter Gassiot FRS (2 April 1797 – 15 August 1877) [also Gassiott] was an English businessman and amateur scientist. He was particularly associated with public demonstrations of electrical phenomena and the development of the Royal Society.

== Life ==
Born in London, he joined the Royal Navy as a midshipman. In 1819 he married Elizabeth Scott and the couple had nine sons and three daughters. In 1822, he joined in business with Spaniard Sebastian Gonzalez Martinez to create the firm of Martinez Gassiot & Co. selling cigars, sherry and port.

He also became an enthusiastic amateur scientist with a particular interest in electricity. He created an amply-provided laboratory at his home on Clapham Common and opened it to his fellow scientists, including James Clerk Maxwell who performed much of his 1860s work on electrical resistance there.

== Science administrator and populariser ==
Gassiot was a close associate of William Sturgeon and Charles Vincent Walker and the three were instrumental in founding the London Electrical Society in 1837. The society was famous for the public electrical displays mounted by Gassiot. Gassiot was elected Fellow of the Royal Society in 1841 and was instrumental in the Society's reform in the 1840s. He was a founder of the Chemical Society in 1845, closely associated with the London Institution, and a Surrey magistrate.

== Scientist ==
Gassiot was a close associate of William Robert Grove at the Royal Society, encouraging Grove to join the London Institution where the two worked together on the development of photography.

Gassiot's work was particularly important in the demise of the contact theory of voltaic electricity. Starting in 1840 he performed a number of experiments culminating in 1844 where he used a battery of 100 mutually insulated Grove cells to show that a spark could be drawn before an electrical contact was made. Gassiot extended Groves's work on striae in electrical discharges, showing that the discharge cannot continue in a vacuum.

In 1858, Gassiot, in his Bakerian lecture, reported deflections of electrical discharges in rarefied gases both by magnetism and electrostatics. Though this was an early observation of the phenomenon of cathode rays, Julius Plücker is usually credited with their discovery.

== Honours ==
- Royal Medal of the Royal Society (1863).
- Juror's Medal of the London Exhibition of 1862.

== Death ==
Gassiot died at home at Ryde, Isle of Wight, but was taken to West Norwood Cemetery for burial. His third son, Charles Gassiot (1826–1902), took over as head of the family wine business, and was an art patron, donating extensively to the Guildhall Art Gallery.

== Bibliography ==
- Obituaries:
  - Journal of the Chemical Society, 33 (1878), 227
  - Nature, 16 (1877), 388, 399–400

- Hall, M. B. (1984). All Scientists Now: The Royal Society in the Nineteenth Century. Cambridge University Press. ISBN 0-521-89263-5.
- Harrison, W. J. (2004) "Gassiot, John Peter (1797–1877)", rev. Iwan Rhys Morus, Oxford Dictionary of National Biography, Oxford University Press. Retrieved 5 August 2007 (subscription, Wikipedia Library access or UK public library membership required)
- Kurzer, F. (2001). "Chemistry and chemists at the London Institution 1807–1912". Annals of Science. 58 (2): 163–201. doi:10.1080/00033790010011177. S2CID 143359294.
- Morus, I. R. (1993). "Currents from the underworld: electricity and the technology of display in early Victorian England". Isis. 84: 50–69. doi:10.1086/356373. S2CID 143983050.
- Morus, I. R. (1998). Frankenstein's Children: Electricity, Exhibition and Experiment in Early-Nineteenth-Century London. Princeton University Press. ISBN 0-691-05952-7.
