= Edward Marmaduke Clarke =

Edward Marmaduke Clarke (1791–1859) was an Irish maker of scientific instruments.

He worked in his native Dublin and London, 1830–1850, and was important in the forming and running of the London Electrical Society. He was buried in All Souls' Cemetery, Kensal Green, London on 31 January 1859.
