= Joseph Kemp (organist) =

English musical composer, organist and teacher

Joseph Kemp (1778–1824) was an English musical composer, organist and teacher. He is noted as an early proponent of teaching music in classes and the playing of exercises by students.

== Biography ==
Joseph Kemp was born in Exeter in 1778 and was a chorister of the cathedral, and a pupil of William Jackson. In 1802 he was appointed organist of Bristol Cathedral; in 1807 he settled in London until 1813, taking a Bachelor of Music degree at Sidney Sussex College, Cambridge in 1808 and a Doctor of Music degree in 1809.

In 1810, at the Russell Institution Kemp began a series of lectures on musical education in which he advocated the teaching of music in classes and the playing of exercises by pupils in concert. On account of failing health he returned with his wife and family to his native city, and resided there until 1824, with the interruption of a visit to France in 1818–21. He had founded a musical college at Exeter in 1814. A journey to London in April 1824 proved too fatiguing for Kemp, then in a weak state of health, and he died in his lodgings on 22 May. He had married in 1805, and left at his death his widow, two sons, and one daughter.

== Works ==
Kemp published two pedagogical works:

1. Upwards of 100 cards, containing more than 500 points in music, connected with the new system of musical education (1810–19)
2. The new system of musical education, being a self instructor and serviceable companion to music masters (c. 1821)

His compositions include:

1. Op. I., twelve songs, London, 1799, which show some originality, are somewhat pastoral in character, and are set to accompaniments of various stringed instruments.
2. Six glees, London, 1800.
3. War anthem, 'A Sound of Battle is in the Land,’ London, 1803, which afterwards served as the exercise for his Mus.Bac. degree.
4. 'Vocal Magazine of Canzonets, Madrigals, Songs,’ &c., Bristol, 1807.
5. 'The Jubilee,’ 1809, written by Kemp and set to music by Kemp and Corri, brought out at the Little Theatre in the Haymarket 25 Oct. 1809.
6. 'The Siege of Isca,’ melodrama, 1810.
7. Anthem, 'The Crucifixion,’ the exercise for his Music Doctorate degree, 1810.
8. 'Sonatas, or Lessons for the Pianoforte,’ a set of exercises, Exeter, 1814
9. Four lessons for the pianoforte or harp.
10. Four lessons for harp.
11. Twenty double chants in score.
12. Twenty psalmodical melodies, dedicated to the Archbishop of Canterbury, London, 1818.
13. Anthem, 'I am Alpha and Omega.'
14. 'Beauties of Shakespeare.'
15. 'Beauties of the Lady of the Lake;’ and many songs.
