= Gallox Bridge =

Bridge in Somerset, England

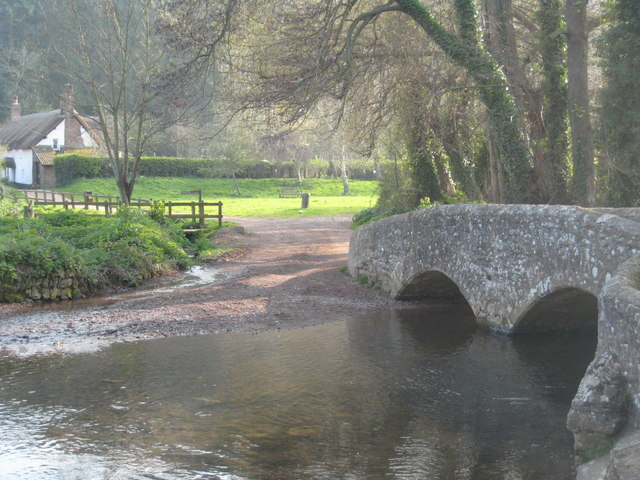
- Coordinates: 51.1790°N 3.4458°W
- Carries: Pedestrians
- Crosses: River Avill
- Locale: Dunster, Somerset, England
- Heritage status: Grade I listed building and scheduled monument

Characteristics
- Material: Stone
- Total length: 13.5 metres (44.3 ft)
- Width: 1.9 metres (6.2 ft)
- No. of spans: 2

History
- Construction end: 15th century

The Gallox Bridge in Dunster, Somerset, England dates from the 15th century. It has been designated as a Grade I listed building and scheduled monument. The bridge is in the guardianship of English Heritage.

The stone packhorse bridge crosses the River Avill at the southern end of the village, below Dunster Castle at a point which may have been the limit of tidal flow during the medieval period. It was important for the transport of wool and other goods to the market within the village which was established by 1222. The name is derived from the nearby gallows. The narrow bridge is approach via a raised causeway for pedestrians, while wheeled traffic uses the adjacent ford.

== History ==
The bridge crosses the River Avill which rises on the eastern slopes of Dunkery Beacon and flows north through Timberscombe and Dunster flowing into the Bristol Channel at Dunster Beach. It is likely that there was a previous bridge on the same site as in the 14th century it was known as Doddebrigge. The bridge may have been at the limit of the tidal mouth of the river during the medieval period. Dunster Beach, which includes the mouth of the River Avill, is now located approximately 0.5 miles (0.80 km) from the village, and used to have a significant harbour, known as Dunster Haven, which was used for the export of wool from Saxon times; however, it was last used in the 17th century and has now disappeared among the dykes, meadows and marshes near the shore.

Dunster had become a centre for woollen and clothing production by the 13th century, with the market dating back to at least 1222, and a particular kind of kersey or broadcloth became known as 'Dunsters'. The prosperity of Dunster was based on the wool trade, with profits helping to pay for the construction of the tower of the Priory Church of St George and provide other amenities.

The name Gallox is believed to be derived from gallows as the village gallows were nearby, when it was called Gallocksbrigge. The bridge is close to Dunster Working Watermill and the base of the hill on which Dunster Castle sits and provides access to the site of the Deer park. It also falls within the Dunster Conservation Area. It has been in the guardianship of English Heritage since the 1950s.

== Architecture ==
It is a narrow stone packhorse bridge, on the southern outskirts of Dunster, with two arches over the River Avill. It has a roadway width of 1.2 metres (3.9 ft), a total width of 1.9 metres (6.2 ft) and is 13.5 metres (44.3 ft) long. The side of the bridge each have four narrow chamfered ribs. The approach from the village is via a raised causeway.

== See also ==
- Grade I listed buildings in West Somerset
- List of English Heritage properties in Somerset
