= London Electrical Society =

The London Electrical Society was established in 1837 to enable amateur electricians to meet and share their interests in "experimental investigation of Electrical Science in all its various branches". Although it initially flourished the society soon showed weaknesses in its organisation and ways of working. After a period of considerable financial difficulty it closed in 1845.

== Rise and fall ==
Initially called "The Electrical Society of London", The London Electrical Society was founded at a meeting held on 16 May 1837 at Edward M Clarke's "Laboratory of Science" in Lowther Arcade, near the Strand. The idea for the Society had arisen from discussions during a course of lectures on electricity delivered by William Sturgeon at the same venue. He was assisted in establishing the Society by operative chemist William Leithead; John Peter Gassiot, an amateur scientist with a particular interest in electricity; and Charles Vincent Walker, an electrical engineer.

The London Electrical Society's aim was to provide a forum for amateur scientists and to foster their interest in the practical applications of electricity. It served to strengthen the informal links which many of the experimenters had already made. In "The Uses of Experiment: Studies in the Natural Sciences" Secord notes that:

The bulk of its membership were 'amateur experimentalists', as founder and first president Sturgeon admitted. Typical of the group were the instrument-maker Edward M. Clarke, the young Manchester electrician James Prescott Joule, and William Leithead, employed by the Gallery as a demonstrator. Others, like Walter Hawkins, William G Lettsom, John Peter Gassiot and [Andrew] Crosse were either successful men business or independently wealthy. Conspicuously absent were the real controlling interests in the London scientific world, men like John Herschel, William Grove and Faraday.

Membership was made up of resident (living within 20 miles of London) and non-resident participants, with annual fees set at two guineas and one guinea respectively. Non-resident members were elsewhere in Great Britain (e.g. Bath and Shrewsbury), or abroad (e.g. Amsterdam and Marseille). At first, members styled themselves Mem. Elec. Soc., but later they used the post-nominal MES.

In the early days the Society met in Clarke's Laboratory of Science, but at the first annual general meeting, on 7 October 1837 (with John P Gassiot, Treasurer, in the chair), it was announced that future meetings would be held at the nearby Adelaide Gallery on the Strand, to accommodate the growing membership. The gallery's proprietors generously made their electrical apparatus freely available for the use of the Society's members.

The meetings, initially held on the first and third Saturdays of the month at 7:00pm, involved the reading and discussion of experimental papers by members and their guests. Roughly half of the first 120 papers had an emphasis on technology, typically describing an improvement in a technique, or of a piece of apparatus. An example is Charles V Walker's "An Account of Experiments with a 'Constant Voltaic Battery'" read in October 1838, in which he described the results of assembling and testing a 160-cell battery of zinc and copper electrodes immersed in saturated copper sulphate solution. Other papers were of a more theoretical nature, such as Thomas Pollock's "On the Connection between the Atomic Arrangement and the Conducting power of Bodies."

The London Electrical Society had decided early on that it would not prepare standing Rules and Regulations or formally elect Officers until the membership had reached 50. At the October AGM that threshold was raised to 100 resident members, a number which it never reached. Nonetheless, the Society flourished in the early days: membership grew and papers were published.

Then signs began to appear that all was not well. There was a gap of about a year in which meetings did not take place. Membership fell, and the Society's debts began to grow. This was made worse by the decision to publish many extra copies of the Proceedings and distribute them widely to other organisations in the hope of attracting new members. These factors, and internal rows over ownership of experimental findings, and the departure of Sturgeon for Manchester, all contributed to the Society's downfall. The story is more fully explained by Morus in "Currents from the Underworld".

== Known members ==
This list of 94 members was gathered from the Minute Books of the London Electrical Society, and from papers published in the society's Transactions and Proceedings. Names of members which could not be clearly read in the Minutes have not been included. It is not known how many of the total were all members at the same time, although the number listed here is consistent with Morus's observation that "In 1839 the membership was no greater than eighty of whom only about half were resident members. Reminiscing almost half a century later, Walker recalled that membership had peaked at seventy-six."

- Thomas Abbott
- Robert E Alison
- Prof. George Henry Bachhoffner
- Golding Bird
- Edward William Brayley
- J S Brickwood
- T Burnett
- William Bateman Byng.
- Edward Marmaduke Clarke
- William Clarke
- Collingwood
- Ludwig Colmar
- J M Cornock
- J E Cottam
- Andrew Crosse
- George Daveson
- Thomas d'Iffanger
- Dr Frederick Daniel Dyster
- Thomas Eaton
- George England
- Henry English.
- Samuel Walton Faxon
- Robert Were Fox
- John Peter Gassiot
- Dr Glyde
- Mark A Hartnell
- Walter Hawkins
- David Henry
- William Higgins
- Rev J Hoole
- Hoyland
- Jan Schutte Hoyman
- Capt. Levett Landon Boscawen Ibbetson
- R J Iremonger
- H W Jansen
- Joseph Jeffery
- J E Johnson
- James Prescott Joule
- George Knight, jun.
- Richard Knight
- John Howard Kyan
- William Lawson
- William Leithead.
- William Garrow Lettsom
- Rev Francis Lockey
- R Longbottom
- George Mackrell
- Thomas Mason, Jun.
- J McNeil
- Count Merdinsky
- Henry Miller
- Sir William Molesworth, MP
- J V Moore
- Alexander Murray
- F G P Neeson
- Thomas Nesbitt
- Henry Minchin Noad
- William Mountford Nurse.
- William Onions
- William Brooke O'Shaughnessy
- E H Palmer
- William James Parker
- Thomas Patrick
- Dr F Peyron
- John A Phillips
- Thomas Pollock
- T Potter
- Rev A Bath Power
- Horatio Prater
- S Preston
- Martyn Roberts
- William Roden
- Dr Ryan
- John Samo
- Dr Schmidt
- Charles Searle
- John Shewer
- Rev. John Shillibeer.
- Dr Simon
- Alfred Smee.
- Rev. W Smithee
- William Smyth
- Ralph Stamper.
- William Sturgeon
- George Taylor
- F Thielcke
- Arthur Trevelgar
- J Tyler
- Charles Vincent Walker
- William Henry Weekes
- John Weld
- James Whatman, jun., FRS
- Thomas Winter
