= George Henry Bachhoffner =

British scientist (1810-1879)

George Henry Bachhoffner (13 April 1810 – 22 July 1879), was a British scientist, one of the founders of the London Polytechnic Institution, and a lecturer on scientific subjects.

Bachhoffner was a native of London. He married Caroline Derby on 23 July 1834 at St Pancras Old Church.

It was in 1837 that he, in conjunction with a few others, established the Polytechnic, which was intended for a place of popular instruction. Here, he held the position of principal of the department of natural and experimental philosophy until 1855. Afterwards, he became lessee and manager of the Coliseum in the Regent's Park, and there gave lectures similar to the courses he had established at the Polytechnic.

In the later part of his life, he held a post as registrar of births and deaths in Marylebone. Bachhoffner was an inventor and took out several patents for inventions connected with the electric telegraph, gas stoves and oil lamps. He was a member of the London Electrical Society.

In experiments with an early induction coil in 1837, he found that replacing the solid iron core with a core made of a bundle of parallel iron wires greatly increased the output voltage. As was later discovered, this was because the divided core prevented eddy currents from flowing in the core. Eddy currents, circular electric currents induced in the core by the changing magnetic field, cause power losses. The technique of a "divided" iron core was used in all subsequent transformers, and is still used today in the form of laminated cores in transformers and powdered iron cores in inductors. Bachhoffner can thus be credited with the invention of this method of preventing eddy current losses.
