= Charles Vincent Walker =

English electrical engineer

Charles Vincent Walker FRS (20 March 1812 – 24 December 1882) was an English electrical engineer and publisher, a major influence on the development of railway telecommunications, he was also the first person to send a submarine telegraph signal.

== Life ==
Born Marylebone, Middlesex son to Vincent and Ann née Blake, Walker's elementary education and engineering training are uncertain. However, by 1838 he had acquired some knowledge of electricity and had helped to found the London Electrical Society. Walker was secretary and treasurer of the Society in its early days and edited its Proceedings from 1841 to 1843. He also founded the Electrical Magazine, though only two volumes appeared in 1841–3.

Also in 1841, Walker worked on the Manual of Electricity, Magnetism and Meteorology which formed part of Dionysius Lardner's Cabinet Cyclopedia. Walker also published his own book on Electrotype Manipulation, followed by his Electric Telegraph Manipulation (1850), and many other scientific works.

== Railway electrician ==
In 1845, he became electrician to the South Eastern Railway, a post in which he was to serve for the rest of his life. His achievements included:

- The first person to insulate telegraph wires with gutta-percha
- Invention of a device to protect telegraph equipment from atmospheric electricity
- Improvement of graphite batteries
- Time signals transmitted to the railway's stations from the Royal Observatory, Greenwich, introduced following Walker's collaboration with Astronomer Royal George Biddell Airy (1849)
- A device to enable passengers to communicate with the guard; patented in 1866
- A train describer; patented in 1876

== Submarine telegraph ==
His work with gutta-percha led him to see the opportunity for a submarine communications cable and sent the first submarine telegraph message on 13 October 1848 over a 2-mile (3.2 km) cable from Folkestone to a ship and back.

== Death and personal life ==
Charles Walker married Susanna Maria Violett in Ramsgate on 12 May 1846. Susanna worked a private two-needle telegraph between their home and his office in Tunbridge Wells, Kent, where they lived for most of their lives. They had no children. Mrs Walker died in March 1882 in Reigate. Walker died of heart failure in Tunbridge Wells, Kent.

Walker's half-brother, Alfred Owen Walker (1834-1878), was also employed in the telegraph department of the South Eastern Railway. In 1865 A O Walker was appointed telegraph superintendent of the Stockton & Darlington Railway, and was responsible for the introduction of block signalling on this railway.

== Obituary Notices ==
Royal Astronomical Society

Charles Vincent Walker died at his residence at Tunbridge Wells, on the morning of 24 December 1882, in the seventy-first year of his age. He had been Telegraph Engineer to the South Eastern Railway since 1845, and was one of the oldest telegraph engineers in the country. He was a zealous worker in the science of electricity, and was the inventor of several useful appliances in connection with telegraphy, including the instruments by which the block system on railways is worked. His name is especially associated with the origin of the distribution of time by telegraph. On 10 May 1849, Mr. Glaisher wrote to Mr. Walker that he wished to talk with the latter about the laying down of a wire from the Observatory to the Lewisham Station, and on 23 May following, the Astronomer Royal gave Mr. Walker a brief sketch of the use to be made of the wire referred to, his scheme, as he stated, being " the transmission of time by galvanic signal to every part of the kingdom in which there is a galvanic telegraph from London." It was proposed to lay four wires underground from the Royal Observatory to the railway station at Lewisham, and to extend them to London Bridge. The South Eastern Railway Company gave every facility. On 16 September 1852, an electric clock at London Bridge Station was erected, and connected by wire with an electric clock at the Royal Observatory, Greenwich. The first time-signal sent from the Royal Observatory was received at London Bridge Station at 4 p.m. on 5 August 1852; and on 9 August 1852, Dover received a time-signal for the first time from the Royal Observatory direct, and it was made visible at certain first-class stations between London and Dover. After that the system rapidly spread, its success depending greatly on the scientific skill and zeal of Mr. Walker.

He was elected a Fellow of the Royal Society in 1855, and he was a late President of the Meteorological Society, and of the Society of Telegraph Engineers. He was elected a Fellow of the Society on 8 January 1858.

Index of Obituary Notice for the Year 1882

WALKER (Charles Vincent), F.R.S., Past President of the Society of Telegraph Engineers, Telegraph Engineer to the South-Eastern Railway Co. 1845–82, d. at 26, Upper Grosvenor Road, Tunbridge Wells, 24 December (aged 70). Nature, xxvii. p. 228; Telegraphic Jour. and Electrical Review, xii. p. 16; Mon. Notices R. Astron. Soc. xliii. p. 182; *Iron, xx. p. 549; *Times, 28 December, p. 3/; Ath. 1883, i. p. 21; Engineering, xxxv. p. 18.

== Offices and honours ==
- British Meteorological Society
  - Member, (1850);
  - President, (1869–70);
  - Editor of the Proceedings, (1861–1864);
- Fellow of the Royal Society, (1855);
- Fellow of the Royal Astronomical Society, (1858);
- President of the Society of Telegraph Engineers and Electricians, (1876).

== Bibliography ==
- McConnell, A. (2004) "Walker, Charles Vincent (1812–1882)", Oxford Dictionary of National Biography, Oxford University Press, accessed 7 August 2007 (subscription required)
- Morus, I. R. (2000). "'The nervous system of Britain': space, time and the electric telegraph in the Victorian age". British Journal for the History of Science. 33 (4): 455–475. doi:10.1017/S0007087400004210.
- Platinum and the Greenwich System of Time-Signals in Britain The Work of George Biddell Airy and Charles Vincent Walker from 1849 to 1870 By John A. Chaldecott
- Books by Charles Vincent Walker in Google Books
- "Walker, Charles Vincent" . Dictionary of National Biography. London: Smith, Elder & Co. 1885–1900.
