= Broomfield, Somerset =

Village and civil parish in Somerset, England

Coordinates: 51.081°N 3.114°W

Broomfield
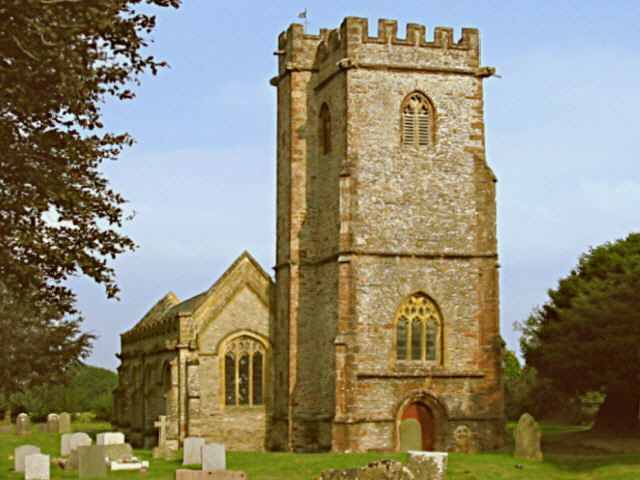
- Church of St. Mary and All Saints, Broomfield

- Location within Somerset
- Population: 249
- OS grid reference: ST220318
- Unitary authority: Somerset Council
- Ceremonial county: Somerset
- Region: South West
- Country: England
- Sovereign state: United Kingdom
- Post town: BRIDGWATER
- Postcode district: TA5
- Dialling code: 01823
- Police: Avon and Somerset
- Fire: Devon and Somerset
- Ambulance: South Western
- UK Parliament: Bridgwater

Broomfield is a village and civil parish in Somerset, England, situated about five miles north of Taunton. According to the 2011 census, it had a population of 249.

The village is the highest village on the Quantock Hills and lies on the Quantock Greenway footpath.

== History ==
Approximately 1 mile (2 km) from the village is the Iron Age hill fort of Ruborough Camp. There was a tunnel, which has now been filled in, which gave the camp safe access to a nearby spring for water.

The estate was owned after the Norman Conquest by William de Mohun of Dunster, 1st Earl of Somerset.

Broomfield was part of the hundred of Andersfield.

== Governance ==
The parish council has responsibility for local issues, including setting an annual precept (local rate) to cover the council's operating costs and producing annual accounts for public scrutiny. The parish council evaluates local planning applications and works with the local police, district council officers, and neighbourhood watch groups on matters of crime, security, and traffic. The parish council's role also includes initiating projects for the maintenance and repair of parish facilities, as well as consulting with the district council on the maintenance, repair, and improvement of highways, drainage, footpaths, public transport, and street cleaning. Conservation matters (including trees and listed buildings) and environmental issues are also the responsibility of the council.

For local government purposes, since 1 April 2023, the village comes under the unitary authority of Somerset Council. Prior to this, it was part of the non-metropolitan district of Sedgemoor, which was formed on 1 April 1974 under the Local Government Act 1972, having previously been part of Bridgwater Rural District.

It is also part of the Bridgwater county constituency represented in the House of Commons of the Parliament of the United Kingdom. It elects one Member of Parliament (MP) by the first past the post system of election. It was part of the South West England constituency of the European Parliament prior to Britain leaving the European Union in January 2020, which elected seven MEPs using the d'Hondt method of party-list proportional representation.

== International Music Concerts ==
Since 2008 the village has been home to a series of international concerts including classical music, jazz, indie, folk and performance poetry.

Events are held in barns, a large marquee, the parish church and village hall.

The concerts, known as Music on the Quantocks, have attracted musicians from around the world including flautist Sir James Galway, the guitarist John Williams, the European Union Orchestra, and choral groups the Hilliard Ensemble and The Sixteen.

Over 300 events have taken place. Each was sold out. Concerts are rarely advertised. News about them is available only via a mailing list.

Concerts resumed in June 2021 following a 15-month suspension due to the Coronavirus pandemic.

== Church ==
The Church of St. Mary and All Saints was built in the 15th and 16th centuries. The church contains the laboratory table of Andrew Crosse, on which he carried out electrical experiments and an obelisk in his memory is in the churchyard.

== Fyne Court ==
Fyne Court is now a National Trust-owned nature reserve and visitor centre. The Quantock Hills AONB and Somerset Wildlife Trust have their headquarters at the house. Originally the house pleasure grounds of the 19th-century amateur scientist and electrical pioneer, Andrew Crosse, whose family had owned the house from its construction. It burnt down in 1898. His laboratory table on which he carried out experiments stands in the aisle of the Church of St. Mary and All Saints in Broomfield and an obelisk in his memory is in the churchyard.

== Notable residents ==
- The politician Lord Rippon of Hexham lived in the village and is buried in the churchyard.
- The Clash vocalist Joe Strummer died from a heart attack at his home there in December 2002.
- The cricketer Alfred Bowerman was born in the village.
