= George Singer =

English early pioneer of electrical research

- Born: 1786
- Died: 28 June 1817 (aged 30–31)
- Known for: Publications and lectures
- Scientific career
- Fields: Electrics

George John Singer (1786 – 28 June 1817) was an English early pioneer of electrical research, noted for his publications and for lectures delivered privately and at the Russell Institution.

== Biography ==
Singer was the son of Thomas Singer, and the younger brother of Samuel Weller Singer. In early life he was engaged in his mother's business of artificial-flower making. Every spare moment, however, he devoted to scientific study, more particularly to the investigation of electricity and electromagnetism, then little known. He was a friend of and worked with Andrew Crosse, another early electrical pioneer. Singer built, almost unassisted, a large room at the back of his mother's house in Prince's Street, Cavendish Square, where he gave courses of lectures on electricity and kindred subjects. Among his audience were Michael Faraday and Sir Francis Ronalds.

Singer published Elements of Electricity and Electro-chemistry, London, 1814, a work of considerable contemporary importance, which was translated into French (Paris, 1817), into Italian (Milan, 1819), and into German (Breslau, 1819). He also contributed several papers to the Philosophical Magazine from 1813 to 1815, of which a list is given in Ronalds's Catalogue of Books on Electricity, Magnetism, &c.

Singer made almost the whole of his apparatus himself, and introduced several enhancements. He invented an improved gold-leaf electrometer that was used widely for many years. A key feature was a new mode of insulating the wire connected to the leaves through the cap of the bottle, which he announced in 1811 and described in his book. Ronalds later put on record that the idea for the insulation was his.

Singer died, unmarried, of pulmonary tuberculosis, induced by overwork, on 28 June 1817, at his mother's house.

He lived in the Old House now known as Coundon Court Academy.
