= Church of St Mary & All Saints, Broomfield =

Church in Somerset, England

Church of St Mary & All Saints
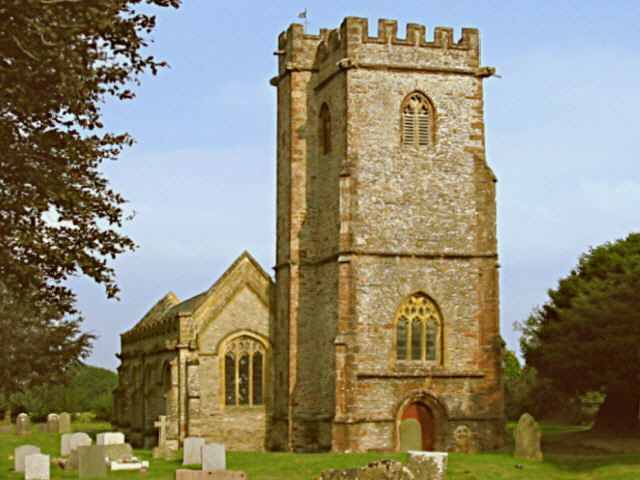

- Location within Somerset

General information
- Location: Broomfield, England
- Coordinates: 51.0824°N 3.1088°W
- Completed: 16th century

The Church of St Mary & All Saints in Broomfield, Somerset, England, was built in the 15th and 16th centuries and has been designated as a Grade I listed building.

The south chancel wall was built around 1320. The north aisle is from 1535. There is a stained glass window by the company of William Morris.

The three-stage tower was built around 1440. It includes a bell by George Purdue dating from 1606.

The church contains the laboratory table of Andrew Crosse, of the nearby Fyne Court, on which he carried out electrical experiments and an obelisk in his memory is in the churchyard. Also, inside the church, is a 16th-century chest and 15th-century octagonal font.

The Anglican parish is part of the benefice of West Monkton with Kingston St Mary, Broomfield and Cheddon Fitzpaine within the archdeaconry of Taunton.

== See also ==
- List of Grade I listed buildings in Sedgemoor
- List of towers in Somerset
- List of ecclesiastical parishes in the Diocese of Bath and Wells
