= Henry Minchin Noad =

British scientist (1815–1877)

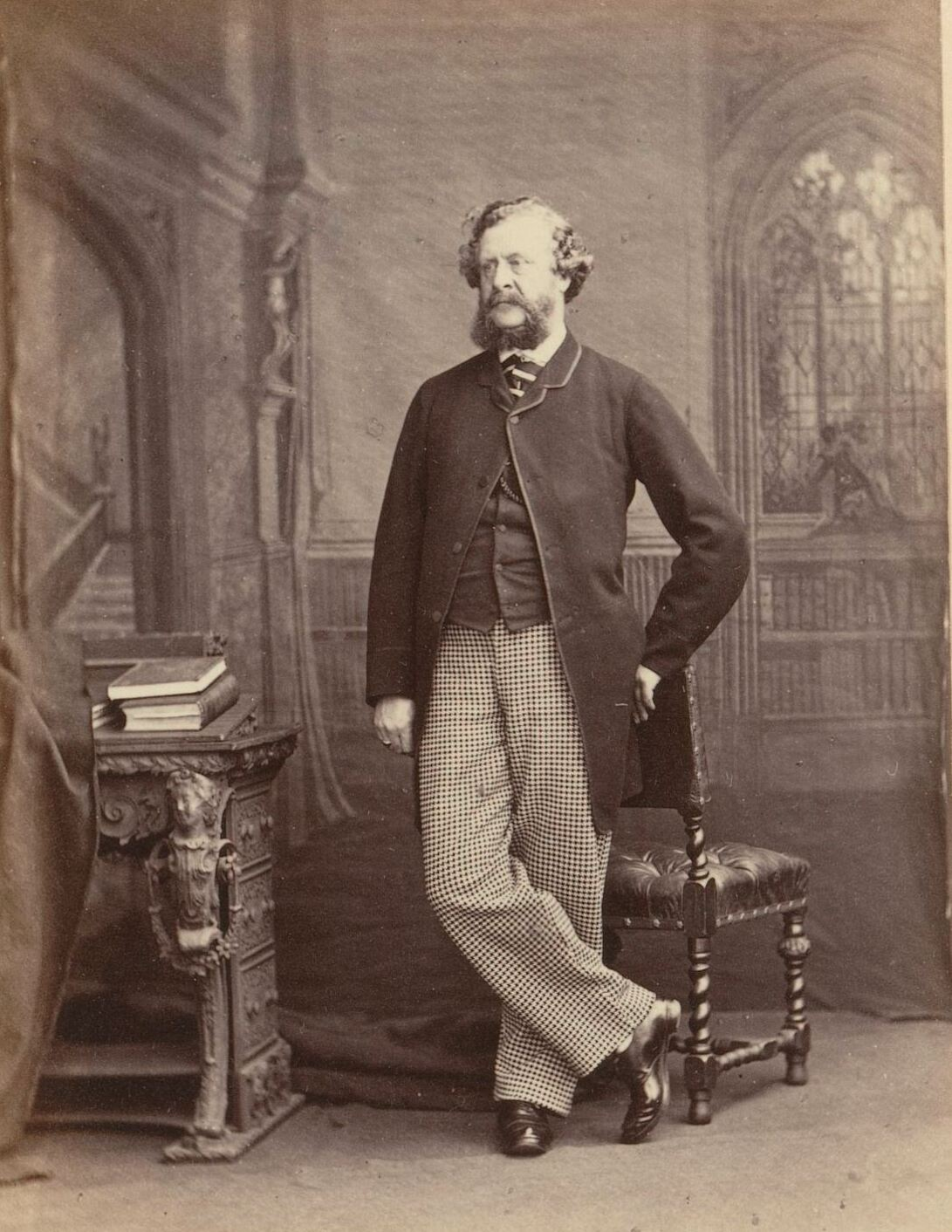
- Portrait of Henry Minchin Noad, c.1863, by Ernest Edwards
- Born: 22 June 1815; Shawford, Frome, Somerset, United Kingdom
- Died: 23 July 1877 (aged 62); Norwood, Surrey, United Kingdom
- Education: Frome grammar school
- Occupations: chemist and physicist
- Employer: St George's Hospital
- Known for: chair of chemistry in the medical school of St George's Hospital, London and member of the London Electrical Society
- Spouse: Charlotte Jane Noad
- Parent(s): Humphry and Maria Noad

Henry Minchin Noad FRS (22 June 1815 – 23 July 1877) was an English chemist and physicist.

== Biography ==
Noad, born at Shawford, near Frome, Somerset, 22 June 1815, was son of Humphrey Noad, by Maria Hunn, a half-sister of the Rt. Hon. George Canning. He was educated at Frome grammar school, and was intended for the civil service in India, but the death of his patron, William Huskisson, caused a change in his career, and he commenced the study of chemistry and electricity. About 1836 he delivered lectures on these subjects at the literary and scientific institutions of Bath and Bristol.

He next examined the peculiar voltaic conditions of iron and bismuth, described some properties of the water battery, and elucidated that curious phenomenon the passive state of iron. In 1845 he came to London, and studied chemistry under August Wilhelm Hofmann, in the newly founded Royal College of Chemistry. While with Hofmann he made researches on the oxidation of cymol or cymene, the hydro-carbon which Gerhardt and Cahours discovered in 1840 in the volatile oil of Roman cumin. The results were in part communicated to the Chemical Society at the time, and more fully afterwards to the Philosophical Magazine, 1848, xxxii. 15–35.

Among other organic products, legumine and vitelline also formed materials for his investigations. In 1847 he was appointed to the chair of chemistry in the medical school of St George's Hospital, which he held till his death. About 1849 he obtained the degree of doctor of physics from the university of Giessen, and in 1850–1 conducted, conjointly with Henry Gray, an inquiry into the composition and functions of the spleen. The essay resulting from this investigation gained the Astley Cooper prize of 1852.

He next experimented on the chemistry of iron, and in 1860 contributed the article ‘Iron’ to Robert Hunt's edition of ‘Ure's Dictionary.’ This led to his appointment as consulting chemist to the Ebbw Vale Iron Company, the Cwm Celyn and Blaina, the Aberdare and Plymouth, and other ironworks in South Wales. In 1866 he became examiner of malt liquors to the India office, and in 1872 an examiner in chemistry and physics at the Royal Military Academy, Woolwich. When the Panopticon of Science and Arts in Leicester Square was opened in 1854, he was appointed instructor in chemistry there. On 5 June 1856 he was elected a fellow of the Royal Society.

Noad was a member of the London Electrical Society. In 1839 he published A Course of Eight Lectures on Electricity, Galvanism, Magnetism, and Electro-Magnetism, which became a recognised textbook, passing through four editions; in 1857 it gave place to A Manual of Electricity in two volumes, which was long a standard book. In 1848 he wrote a valuable treatise on Chemical Manipulation and Analysis, Qualitative and Quantitative, for the Library of Useful Knowledge, and re-wrote in 1875 A Normandy's Commercial Handbook of Chemical Analysis, a volume which meets the wants of the analyst while discharging his duties under the Adulteration Act.

He died at his son's residence in High Street, Lower Norwood, Surrey, on 23 July 1877. Charlotte Jane, his widow, died on 25 March 1882, aged 67. He was buried at West Norwood Cemetery.

== Publications ==
Besides the works already mentioned, Noad was the author of: 1. ‘Lectures on Chemistry, including its Applications in the Arts, and the Analysis of Organic and Inorganic Compounds,’ 1843. 2. ‘The Improved Induction Coil, being a Popular Explanation of the Electrical Principles on which it is constructed,’ 1861; 3rd edit. 1868. ‘A Manual of Chemical Analysis, Qualitative and Quantitative,’ 1863–4. 4. ‘The Students' Text-Book of Electricity, with four hundred illustrations,’ 1867, new edit. 1879. He also issued a revised and enlarged edition of Sir W. S. Harris's ‘Rudimentary Magnetism’ in 1872, and wrote many papers in scientific journals.
