= River Avill =

River in Somerset, England

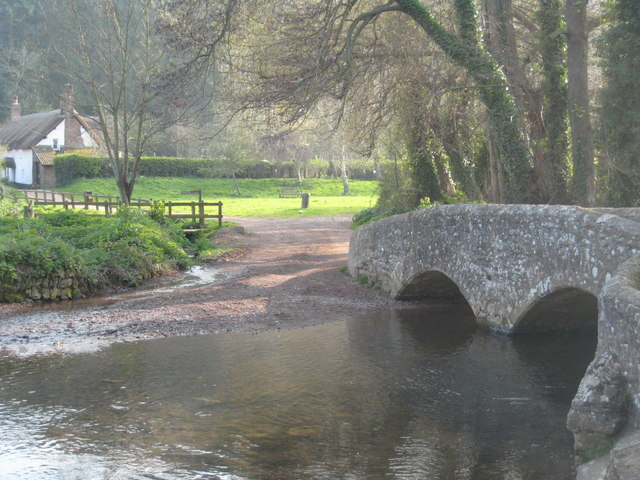
- Gallox Bridge, Dunster

Location
- Country: England
- County: Somerset
- Cities: Timberscombe, Dunster

Physical characteristics
- Source: Dunkery Beacon
  - location: Somerset, England
  - coordinates: 51°09′27″N 3°35′20″W
- Mouth: Dunster Beach
  - location: Dunster, Somerset, England
  - coordinates: 51°11′23″N 3°25′19″W

The River Avill is a small river on Exmoor in Somerset, England.

It rises on the eastern slopes of Dunkery Beacon and flows north through Timberscombe and Dunster flowing into the Bristol Channel at Dunster Beach. It runs South-West of Minehead, and North of Taunton.

The Gallox Bridge in Dunster dates from the 15th century. It has been designated as a Grade I listed building and Scheduled Ancient Monument. It is a narrow stone packhorse bridge, on the southern outskirts of Dunster, with two arches over the River Avill. It was originally known as Gallows Bridge and has a roadway width of 1.2 metres (3.9 ft), a total width of 1.9 metres (6.2 ft) and is 13.5 metres (44.3 ft) long. The river then skirts Dunster New Park surrounding Dunster Castle.

Near to Dunster Beach the stream is crossed by a bridge on the West Somerset Railway.

The river was part of the inspiration for the hymn All Things Bright and Beautiful.
