= List of hills of Somerset =

This is a list of hills in Somerset. Many of these hills are important historical, archaeological and nature conservation sites, as well as popular hiking and tourist destinations in the county of Somerset in southern England.

== Colour key ==
Class	Prominence
Marilyns	150 – 599 m
HuMPs	100 – 149 m
TuMPs	30 – 99 m
Unclassified	0 – 29 m

The table is colour-coded based on the classification or "listing" of the hill. The types that occur in Somerset are Marilyns, HuMPs and TuMPs, listings based on topographical prominence. "Prominence" correlates strongly with the subjective significance of a summit. Peaks with low prominences are either subsidiary tops of a higher summit or relatively insignificant independent summits. Peaks with high prominences tend to be the highest points around and likely to have extraordinary views. A Marilyn is a hill with a prominence of at least 150 metres or about 500 feet. A "HuMP" (the acronym comes from "Hundred Metre Prominence) is a hill with a prominence of at least 100 but less than 150 metres. In this table Marilyns are in beige and HuMPs in lilac. In this context, a "TuMP" is a hill with a prominence of at least 30 but less than 100 metres, and should not be confused with the traditional term appearing in place names 'Tump'. The term "sub-Marilyn" or "sub-HuMP" is used, e.g. in the online Database of British and Irish Hills to indicate hills that fall just below the threshold. To qualify for inclusion, hills must either be 300 metres or higher with a prominence of at least 30 metres, below 300 metres with a prominence of at least 90 metres (the threshold for a sub-HuMP) or be in some other way notable. For further information see the Lists of mountains and hills in the British Isles and the individual articles on Marilyns, HuMPs, TuMPs, and Tumps.

== List of hills ==
Hill	Height (m)	Prom. (m)	Grid ref.	Class	Parent	Range/Region	Remarks	Image
Dunkery Beacon	519	414	SS891415	Marilyn, Dewey, HuMP, TuMP, Somerset county top (historical and current)	High Willhays	Exmoor	Somerset's county top. Highest point of Exmoor. Large cairn at summit	
Great Rowbarrow	510	22	SS875415	sub-Dewey	Dunkery Beacon	Exmoor	Second highest point of Exmoor and Somerset. Large tumulus at summit. Tumulus 110m SW is at least 1m lower	
Chains Barrow	487	65	SS734419	TuMP	Dunkery Beacon	Exmoor	Trig point on tumulus at summit.	
Black Mires	465	42	SS844429	TuMP	Dunkery Beacon	Exmoor	No feature on heather-covered summit.	
Horsen Hill	443	45	SS781364	TuMP	Dunkery Beacon	Exmoor	Summit on rim of tumulus.	
Winsford Hill	428	87	SS876342	TuMP	Dunkery Beacon	Exmoor	Trig point on summit.	
Withypool Common	428	34	SS818350	TuMP	Dunkery Beacon	Exmoor	Summit features: trig point; Brightworthy barrows. Ground 70m SW of trig point is as high as base of tumulus.	
Lype Hill	423	139	SS950371	HuMP, TuMP	Dunkery Beacon	Brendon Hills	Highest point of the Brendon Hills. No summit feature. 2m E of trig point on mound in fenced-off compound.	
Thornemead Hill	412	35	SS809375	TuMP	Dunkery Beacon	Exmoor	No summit feature.	
Treborough Common	412	64	ST004351	TuMP	Dunkery Beacon	Brendon Hills	Trig point at summit. Wiveliscombe Barrow on southern hillside.	
Withypool Hill	398	35	SS840344	TuMP	Dunkery Beacon	Exmoor	Smsll cairn on rim of tumulus. Stone circle nearby.	
Elworthy Barrows	394	45	ST069338	TuMP	Dunkery Beacon	Brendon Hills	Pasture. No summit feature. Hillfort and mast on southern hillside.	
Road Hill	391	39	SS852370	TuMP	Dunkery Beacon	Brendon Hills	Trig point on pedestal in fence line is the summit. WW2 gun emplacement and Herne's Barrow nearby.	
Staddon Hill	386	65	SS875371	TuMP	Dunkery Beacon	Exmoor	No summit feature	
Wills Neck	386	269	ST165351	Marilyn, HuMP, TuMP	Dunkery Beacon	Quantock Hills	Highest point of the Quantocks. No summit feature; summit 2m S of trig point.	
Monkham Hill	382	125	SS987393	HuMP, TuMP	Lype Hill	Brendon Hills	No summit feature; summit 100m SE of trig point.	
Lydeard Hill	364	31	ST179341	TuMP	Wills Neck	Quantock Hills	No summit feature; path.	
Blagdon Hill	361	45	SS971337	TuMP	Wills Neck	Brendon Hills	No summit feature; ground in field 40m S of trig point.	
Black Hill	358	40	ST148381	TuMP	Wills Neck	Quantock Hills	No summit feature; ground 4m ESE of trig point.	
Hadborough	355	78	ST148381	TuMP	Dunkery Beacon	Haddon Hill	Trig point at summit; pile of stones/geocache 15m N may be as high.	
Oldrey Hill	355	66	SS904369	TuMP	Dunkery Beacon	Exmoor	No summit feature, but bridleway runs past summit about 100m to the E.	
Couple Cross Hill	344	37	SS955387	TuMP	Dunkery Beacon	Brendon Hills	No summit feature; ground near small quarry.	
Heydon Hill	342	66	ST036281	TuMP	Dunkery Beacon	Vale of Taunton	No summit feature; tumuli to S not on natural summit.	
Dowsborough	339	57	ST161391	TuMP	Wills Neck	Quantock Hills	Hillfort on summit; in forest.	
Cothelstone Hill	332	80	ST189326	TuMP	Wills Neck	Quantock Hills	Ancient cairn of large stones at summit. Tracks cross by summit. Tumuli nearby.	
Cow Castle	332	34	SS793373	TuMP	Dunkery Beacon	Exmoor	Iron Age hilltop. Prominent grassy top.	
Storridge Hill	327	39	SS947302	TuMP	Dunkery Beacon	Haddon Hill		
Beacon Batch (Black Down)	325	237	ST484572	Marilyn, HuMP, TuMP	The Wrekin	Mendip Hills	Highest point in the Mendip Hills; trig point on summit mound.	
Ley Hill	318	33	SS886446	TuMP	Dunkery Beacon	Exmoor	Heather and gorse-covered summit.	
Upton Hill	317	33	SS979299	TuMP	Dunkery Beacon	Haddon Hill	Upton Farm on southern hillside.	
Staple Hill	315	212	ST240166	Marilyn, Hardy, HuMP, TuMP	Dunkery Beacon	Blackdown Hills	Highest point in the Blackdown Hills. Trig point at summit.	
Whitefield Hill	311	47	ST064303	TuMP	Dunkery Beacon	Brendon Hills	Pasture at summit.	
Selworthy Beacon	308	193	SS918479	Marilyn, HuMP, TuMP	Dunkery Beacon	Exmoor	Ground 2m NNE of trig point is the summit.	
Maundown Hill	307	94	ST061283	sub-HuMP, TuMP	Dunkery Beacon	Exmoor	No summit feature.	
North Hill	307	49	ST539514	TuMP	Beacon Batch	Mendip Hills	Several tumuli around summit (Priddy Nine Barrows).	
Pen Hill	305	47	ST564487	TuMP	Beacon Batch	Mendip Hills	Trig point at summit. Mendip TV transmitter mast nearby.	
Niver Hill	301	33	ST554534	TuMP	Beacon Batch	Mendip Hills	Open summit.	
Niver Hill (county top)	264	0	ST565538	Current county/UA top, administrative county top	Beacon Batch	Mendip Hills	Highest point in the current county of Somerset and the unitary authority of Bath and NE Somerset. Corner of field on side of Niver Hill on the county boundary.	
Wavering Down	210		ST406559		Beacon Batch	Mendip Hills	Open summit with trig point.	
Crook Peak	191		ST387558		Beacon Batch	Mendip Hills	Prominent hill at the western end of the Mendip ridge.	
Glastonbury Tor	158	145	ST512386	HuMP, TuMP, sub-Marilyn	Beacon Batch	Somerset Levels	Prominent hill on Somerset Levels managed by the National Trust and topped by St Michael's Tower, a Grade I listed building. No summit feature: ground 8m E of N corner of tower	
Brent Knoll	139	133	ST340509	HuMP, TuMP	Beacon Batch	Somerset Levels	Dominating hill and landmark on the Somerset Levels; Jubilee Memorial Stone in depression at summit. Site of hillfort.	
Brean Down	97	91	ST296585	TuMP, sub-HuMP	Beacon Batch		Promontory extending into the Bristol Channel and SSSI near Weston-super-Mare. Trig point at summit.	
Burrow Mump	33	29	ST359305	Unclassified	Long Knoll		Historic site and scheduled monument. No summit feature; ground in remains of a church.	

== See also ==
- List of mountains and hills of the United Kingdom
- List of Marilyns in England
- Geography of Somerset
