= Hardy (hill) =

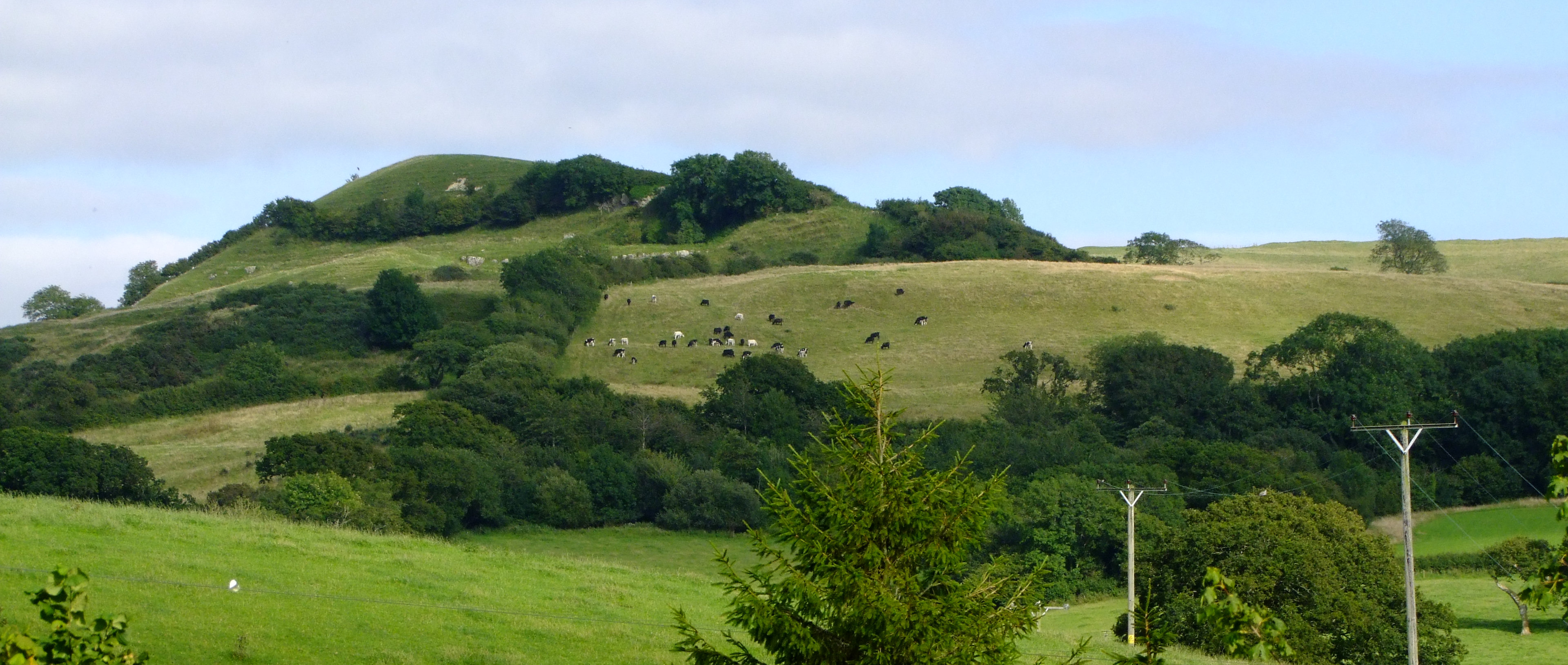
Eggardon Hill, an English Hardy and the highest point on the South Dorset Downs

A Hardy is any one of a category of mountain, hill or high point in the United Kingdom, the Channel Islands and Isle of Man which is the highest point in either a hill range, an island over 1,000 acres (400 ha), or a top-tier administrative area.

== Hill list ==
The Hardy hill list was compiled by Ian Hardy in the early 1990s, published in two booklet editions in the later 1990s, and updated in a third edition in 2010 in a much-expanded book format, The Hardys - The UK's High Points.

The Hardy publication is listed by the Long Distance Walkers Association (LDWA) as an acceptable source for completions of the County Tops of England and Wales, and has featured in its magazine Strider. It also features in a 'list of lists' on the Ordnance Survey blog.

The hill list has also featured in Country Walking and The Great Outdoors magazines.

== Number and location ==
There are now 347 Hardys identified in the United Kingdom, Channel Islands and Isle of Man (with the recent addition (to July 2016) of 5 English low-lying coastal estuary islands): the high points of 61 hill ranges, 96 islands and 190 administrative areas (where the high point is not a hill range or island). There are 183 in England, 31 in Wales, 107 in Scotland and 26 in Northern Ireland.

Within the Hardy list, there are 135 "Core" Hardys, the compiler's original list before a formal lower size limit for islands was established and before the large-scale administrative area changes from the mid-1990s onwards. The highest Hardy is Ben Nevis in Scotland at 1,344 metres, the United Kingdom's highest point, and the lowest location identified is on Hayling Island in Hampshire at only 10 metres. The 5 recent additional Hardys are Portsea Island (343), Foulness (344), Canvey Island (345), Thorney Island (346) and Potton Island (347), all in the South-east of England.

Many Hardys feature in other major hill lists (for example, there are 10 Munros, 23 Hewitts and 127 Marilyns) but the Hardy list is unique in identifying high points in the three separate categories of hill ranges, islands and administrative areas. This means there are Hardys all over the United Kingdom, not just in mountain and hill areas, so many Hardys are in lowland and even urban areas, and on small islands. Thus at least one or more Hardys are accessible wherever a person lives in the United Kingdom, and irrespective of their level of fitness.

Hardys can be "bagged" in the same way as summits in other hill lists.

== Hardys of England ==
- Bassett Avenue
- Beacon Batch
- Black Hambleton
- Botton Head
- Brown Clee Hill
- Brown Willy
- Butser Hill
- The Cheviot
- Cleeve Hill, Gloucestershire
- Cross Fell
- Dunkery Hill
- Easton Hill
- Eggardon Hill
- Godlingston Hill
- High Willhays
- Kinder Scout
- Leith Hill
- Lewesdon Hill
- Liddington Hill
- Lype Hill
- Milk Hill
- Normanby Hill
- North Walney
- Pole Bank
- St Boniface Down
- Scafell Pike
- Staple Hill (Somerset)
- Walbury Hill
- Ward's Stone
- Wendover Hill
- Whernside
- Wills Neck
- Win Green
- Worcestershire Beacon

== Hardys of Northern Ireland ==
- Cuilcagh
- Divis
- Slieve Gullion
- Ouley Hill
- Sliabh Beagh
- Slieve Croob
- Slieve Donard
- Trostan

== Hardys of Scotland ==
- An Sgùrr (Eigg)
- Beinn an Òir
- Beinn Bheigeir
- Ben Cleuch
- Ben Macdui
- Ben Nevis
- Ben Scrien
- Càrn a' Ghaill
- Carn Breugach
- Càrn Eige
- Craigowl Hill
- Creag Bhàn
- Goat Fell
- Green Lowther
- Heaval
- Meikle Says Law
- Merrick (Galloway)
- Middle Shalaval
- Scald Law

== Hardys of Wales ==
- Aran Fawddwy
- Cadair Berwyn
- Cadair Idris
- Carnedd Llewelyn
- Chwarel y Fan
- Craig Llysfaen
- Craig y Llyn
- Drygarn Fawr
- Fan Brycheiniog
- Fan Foel
- Foel Cwmcerwyn
- Garth Hill
- Holyhead Mountain
- Moel Famau
- Pen y Fan
- Plynlimon
- Snowdon
- Twyn Ffynhonnau Goerion
- Waun Fach
- Yr Arwydd

== Crown Dependencies ==
- Le Moulin (Windmill), Sark
- Les Platons, Jersey
- Snaefell (Sniaull), Isle of Man

== See also ==
- Hill lists in the British Isles
