= Wills Neck =

Hill in Somerset, England

Coordinates: 51°06′36″N 3°11′37″W

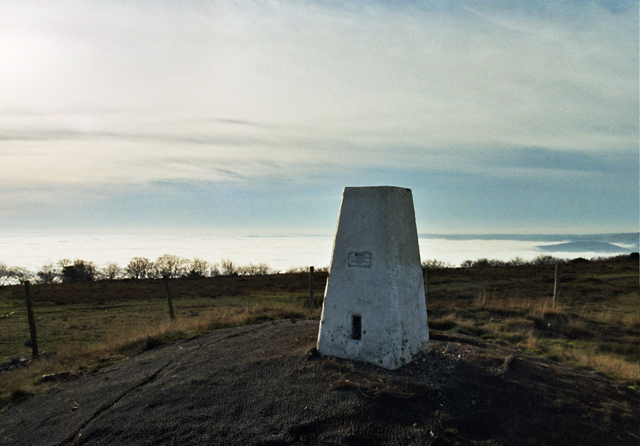
- Trig point on top of Will's Neck

Highest point
- Elevation: 1,261 ft (384 m)
- Prominence: 863 ft (263 m)
- Parent peak: Dunkery Beacon
- Listing: Marilyn, Hardy

Geography
- Location: Quantock Hills, England
- OS grid: ST165352
- Topo map: OS Landranger 181

Wills Neck is the highest summit on the Quantock Hills and one of the highest points in Somerset, England. Although only 1261 ft (384 m) high, it qualifies as one of England's Marilyns. It is about 8 miles (13 km) north west of the historic market town of Taunton.

The name Wills Neck is derived from the Saxon word for "stranger" or "foreigner". It relates to a local tribe the Wealas who, according to legend, fought the Romans at the site.

On a clear day it is possible to see Dartmoor, Exmoor, the Brecon Beacons, the Mendips and Blackdown Hills. It is sometimes even possible to see Pilsdon Pen, the second highest point in Dorset; the highest, Lewesdon Hill, is also visible.

The hill is formed from Hangman Grits laid down during the Devonian, a geologic period of the Paleozoic Era spanning from the end of the Silurian Period, about 419.62 Mya (million years ago), to the beginning of the Carboniferous Period.

Wills Neck was surveyed by schoolboys from Clifton College from 1922 and 1945, led by teacher William Cornish Badcock. They built a cairn at the highest point which has now been replaced, on exactly the same spot, by a modern trig point.

A beer brewed by the Quantock Brewery has been named Wills Neck after the hill.
