= Black Down and Sampford Commons =

- Site of Special Scientific Interest
- Location within Somerset
- Location of Black Down and Sampford Commons.
- Area of search: Somerset and Devon
- Grid reference: ST118161
- Coordinates: 50.93757°N 3.25663°W
- Interest: Biological
- Area: 155.2 hectares (1.552 km^{2}; 0.599 sq mi)
- Notification date: 1952

Black Down and Sampford Commons (grid reference ST118161) is a 155.2-hectare (384-acre) biological Site of Special Scientific Interest in Devon and Somerset, notified in 1952.

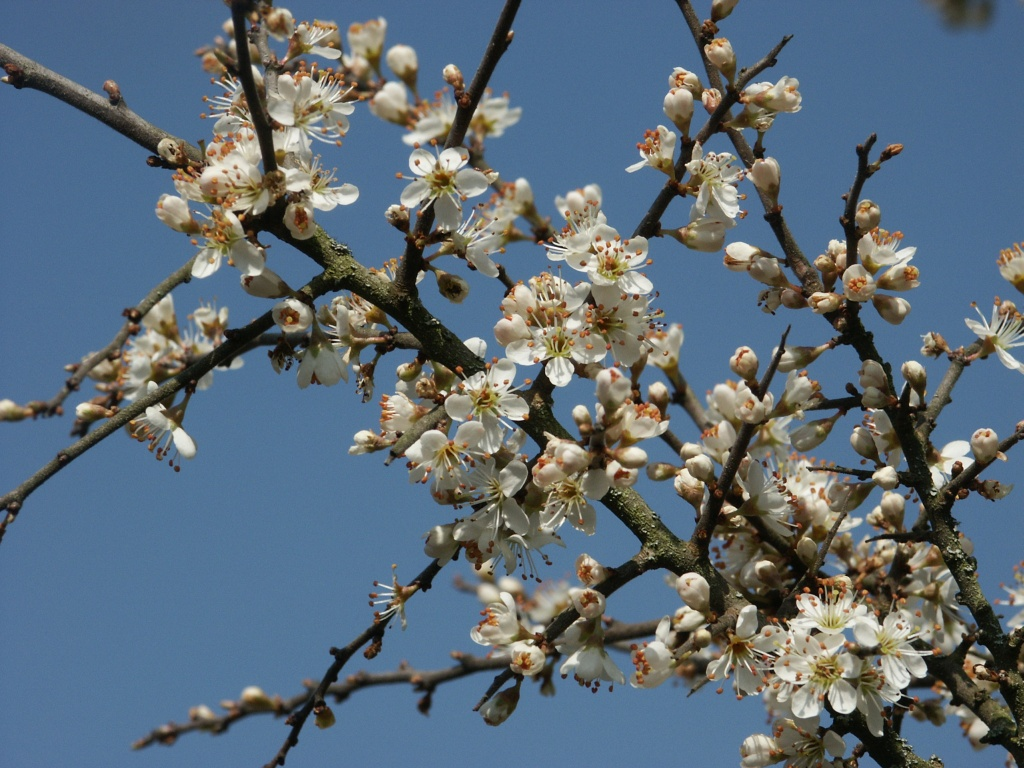
Blackthorn

The Little Breach reserve, which forms part of the SSSI is an area of heathy grassland on Greensand, with some blackthorn and birch, noted for its butterflies and moths.

Blackdown and Sampford Commons have the finest and most extensive surviving examples of the heathland, carr woodland and marshy grassland habitats that have developed on the acidic soils overlying the Greensand and Keuper Marls of the Blackdown Hills. The heathland supports a typical invertebrate fauna, including a wide variety of butterfly species, and with spiders notably abundant. The site is regionally important for birds which favour heathland habitats.
