= Starfish site =

Night-time bombing decoy sites

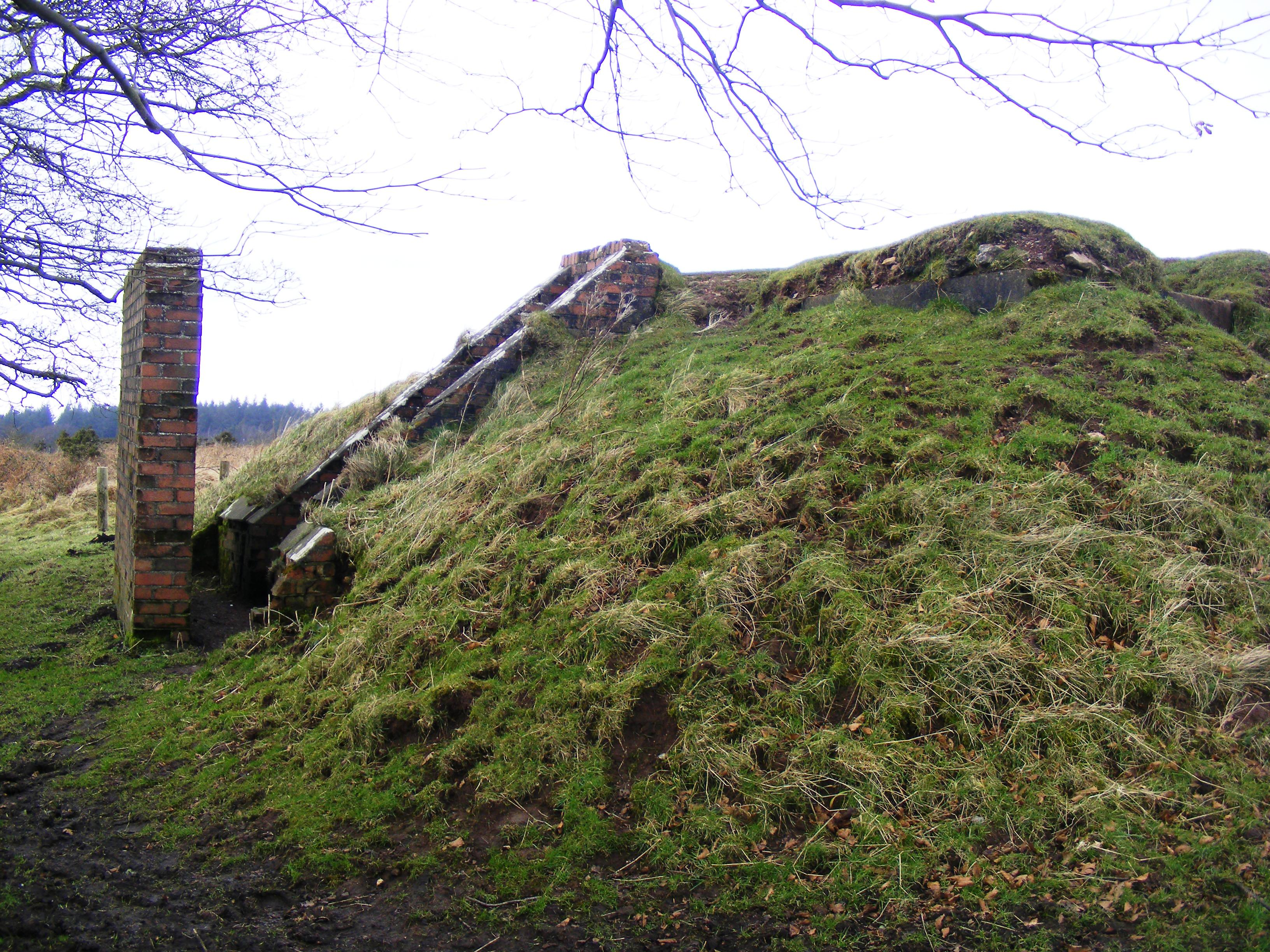
Control bunker for starfish site at Black Down in the Mendip Hills, 2009

Starfish sites were large-scale night-time decoys created during the Blitz to simulate burning British cities. The aim was to divert German night bombers from their intended targets so they would drop their ordnance over the countryside. The sites were an extension of Colonel John Turner's decoy programme for airfields and factories (code named "Q" Sites, probably by analogy with Q-ships. Following the bombing, and near destruction, of Coventry in November 1940, Turner was tasked with creating decoys for seven major cities.

Turner referred to the new sites as "Special Fire" or "SF". However, one early site (near Bristol) was given the name "Starfish", which subsequently became used for all of the decoys. The sites were constructed around 4 miles (6.4 km) from their protection target, and at least 1 mile (1.6 km) from any other settlement. They consisted of elaborate light arrays and fires, controlled from a nearby bunker and laid out to simulate a fire-bombed town. By the end of the war there were 237 decoys protecting 81 towns and cities around the country.

Archaeological excavation in 1992 of the original "Starfish", in the Mendip Hills, found no evidence of bomb craters. Later research confirmed that Starfish sites did attract the attention of enemy bombers; one estimate is that around 968 tons of ordnance were dropped on the decoys.

== Background ==
During the German bombing of Britain, 1914–1918, it had been noticed that night-time Zeppelin bombers tended to attack the first lights they saw on the ground. Networks of dummy lights, that replicated towns or railways were proposed, but the idea was never taken further.

The idea was examined again in the 1930's. But it was not actively pursued until the outbreak of World War II when the British government feared another German bombing campaign against the UK mainland. In September 1939, Colonel John Fisher Turner, an engineer and retired Air Ministry officer, was tasked with establishing day and night decoys to mislead enemy bombers attacking airfields. Previously, Turner had supervised the construction of many real airfields during the late-1930's, large-scale expansion of the RAF.

Turner's initial scheme was for two kinds of decoy site, K and Q-sites. A third kind, QF-sites, were added in 1940.:

- K-sites were an airfield replicas with dummy-aircraft, sited around 5 miles (8.0 km) from the real facility. They were intended to deceive bomber crews into attacking them during the day.
- Q-sites were light decoys using electric lighting, car-headlights and paraffin flare-paths that were intended to deceive bombers at night.
- QF-sites, a Q-site with facilities for lighting fires. This type was introduced when it was found Q-sites were being targeted with incendiary bombs, and that German air-crews were under orders to preferentially drop their incendiary loads onto existing large fires.

By 1941, a network of both kinds of site had been completed.

== Special Fires ==
A steel frame from a Starfish Site at Bramerton in Norfolk. It would have supported a fire basket filled with oil-soaked wood. This could be remotely lit from the site's control-room when a deception operation began. Norfolk and Suffolk Aviation Museum, 2026

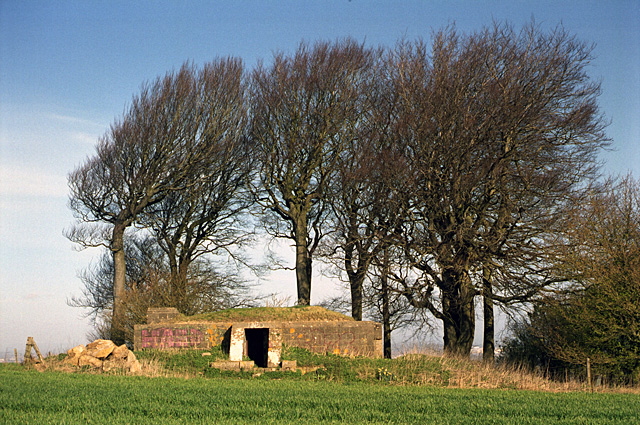
The Starfish site control bunker on Liddington Hill, 2012

Following the night bombing of Coventry, in early November 1940, the decoy programme was expanded to include towns and cities in addition to airfields.

The Air Ministry initially ordered sites to be set up for Bristol, Crewe, Derby, London, Manchester, Middlesbrough and Sheffield. The new "Special Fire" decoys were set up to simulate the bomb drops of German pathfinder squadrons. By 23 January 1941 the programme had been increased to 43 sites protecting 13 town and cities and by March operational sites numbered over 100. By the end of the war there were 237 Starfish sites protecting 81 locations. (Note: The SF codes go from SF1 to SF81.)

One of the first decoy sites was constructed on Black Down on the Mendip Hills; (Note: Dobinson reports that Starfish sites in the main programme had an identification code such as SF1(b). With SF1 referring to Bristol the first town/city to be protected and (a) to (f) being its Starfish sites. The Black Down site appears to SF1(b).) it was code-named "Starfish", derived from Turner's original SF code, and built to protect the nearby city of Bristol. The Starfish name was eventually adopted to describe all of the SF decoy sites. The Mendip Hills site used fires of creosote and water to simulate incendiary bombs exploding. In addition, glow boxes were used to simulate the streets and railways of Bristol; the light bulbs were powered by electrical generators turned by Coventry Climax petrol engines contained in two bunkers. Another of Bristol's sites was located in the parish of Yatton, North Somerset.

Glasgow was protected by various Starfish sites located on its surrounding hillsides. A decoy site existed at Long Wood at grid reference NS 540 524 outside Eaglesham in East Renfrewshire. (Note: The site is SF13(e).) Clusters of impressions where basket fires once stood, bounded by fire-break trenches, covered much of the area seen in Second World War photographs, and a prominent structure near the site may have been the decoy control bunker. Anti-aircraft gun emplacements have been noted at the site. Another site known as Craigmaddie lies on the Campsie Fells at Blairskaith Muir, NS595 762. It was a co-located Starfish and QF/QL site. (Note: The site is SF13(c) and C15(g).) Carrington Moss, near Manchester, was another Starfish site.

As of 2000, there is a relatively intact control bunker for a co-located Starfish and Quick Light (QL) site at Liddington Hill overlooking Swindon. (Note: The site is SF41(a) and C71(a).)

Recent research in North Staffordshire also found the existence of 3 relict QL sites in varying states of preservation that was published in the Journal of Conflict Archaeology in 2025

== Effectiveness ==
A 1992 archaeological survey of the Mendip Hills did not identify surviving bomb craters on the Black Down site (the original "Starfish"), despite claims of their existence. In his 2000 book, Fields of Deception: Britain's Bombing Decoys of World War II, historian Colin Dobinson collated Turner's conservative estimates as to the success of decoy sites; suggesting that Starfish decoys diverted 968 tons of German bombardment. (Note: Dobinson worked on English Heritage's Monuments Protection Programme. The copyright of Fields of Deception: Britain's Bombing Decoys of World War II is vested jointly in Dobinson and English Heritage.)

== Germany ==
The Germans also built large-scale night-time decoys such as the Krupp decoy site (German: Kruppsche Nachtscheinanlage) for the Krupp steel works in Essen.

== See also ==
- R Force
