= Blackdown Hills =

Hill range and natural landscape region in Dorset and Somerset

Blackdown Hills National Landscape

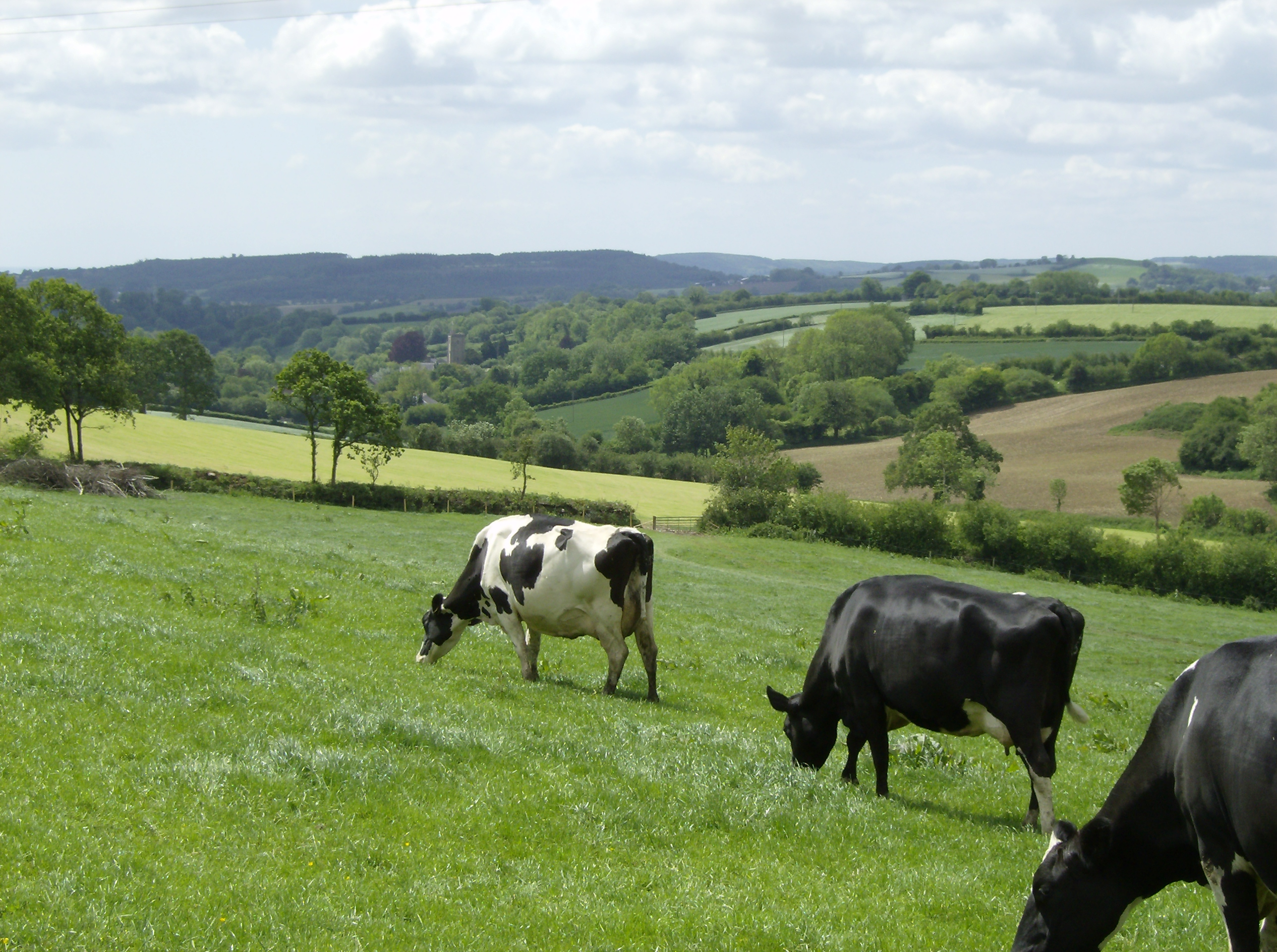
- Blackdown Hills National Landscape near Dalwood, Devon

- Location of the National Landscape in England
- Location: Devon and Somerset, England
- Coordinates: 50°56′49″N 3°13′47″W
- Area: 370 km^{2} (140 sq mi)
- Established: 1991
- Website: blackdownhillsaonb.org.uk

The Blackdown Hills, or Blackdowns, are a range of hills along the Somerset–Devon border in south-western England. The plateau is dominated by hard chert bands of Upper Greensand with some remnants of chalk, and is cut through by river valleys.

The Blackdown Hills were designated in 1991 as an Area of Outstanding Natural Beauty (AONB). In November 2023, AONBs became National Landscapes. The hills support an extensive range of wildlife leading to the designation of 16 Sites of Special Scientific Interest (SSSIs).

There is evidence of human occupation since the Iron Age. Fortifications include the remains of ancient hill forts, Norman motte-and-bailey castles and Second World War airfields. There are also religious buildings such as Dunkeswell Abbey and village churches. The hills are crossed by a network of minor roads, and major transport routes including the M5 motorway run around the periphery.

== Natural region ==
The Blackdowns form a natural region that has been designated as a national character area – No. 147 – by Natural England, the public body responsible for England's natural environment. Neighbouring natural regions are: the Devon Redlands to the west, the Vale of Taunton and Quantock Fringes to the north, the Mid Somerset Hills to the northeast, the Yeovil Scarplands to the east and the Marshwood and Powerstock Vales to the southeast.

== Geography ==
Straddling the border of Somerset and Devon, the Blackdown Hills AONB covers an area of 370 square kilometres (143 sq mi). The hills reach their highest point of 315 metres (1,033 ft) above sea level at Staple Hill in Somerset. The hills in the southern part of the area, near Honiton in Devon, are more gentle. The Blackdown Hills are a sparsely populated area; much of the land is used for dairy farming.

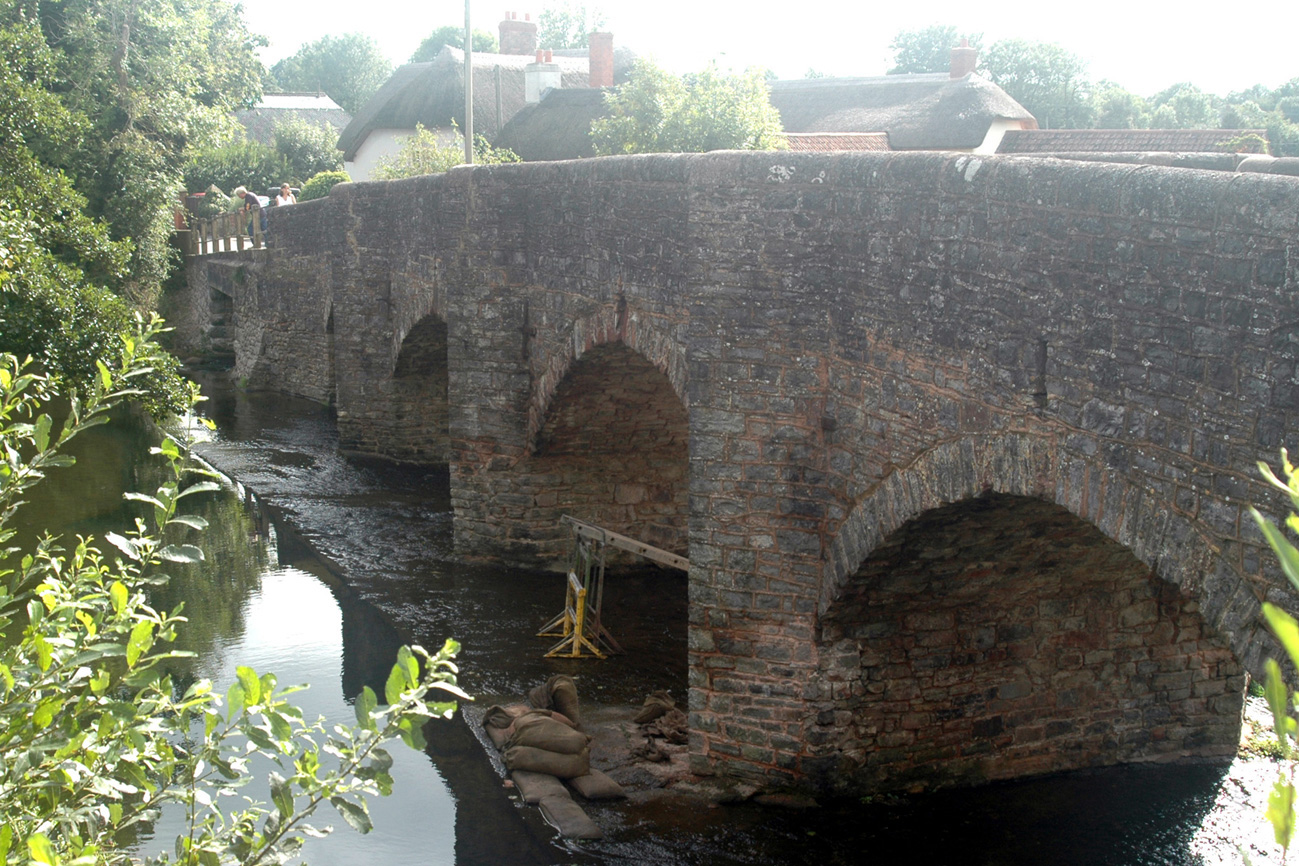
Old stone bridge with pedestrian refuges over River Culm at Culmstock

The River Culm rises at a spring (grid reference ST2205016050) near Culmhead and flows west through Hemyock, then Culmstock to Uffculme before joining the River Exe on the north-western outskirts of Exeter. The name of the river is thought to mean 'knot' or 'tie', in reference to the river's twists and loops; or is derived from a Celtic river-name meaning winding stream. The River Otter rises near Otterford, where a stream feeds the Otterhead lakes: (ST225152). It then flows south for 32 kilometres (20 mi) through East Devon to the English Channel at the western end of Lyme Bay. The Permian and Triassic sandstone aquifer in the Otter Valley is one of Devon's largest groundwater sources, supplying drinking water to Taunton. The other rivers are the River Yarty and the Corry Brook.

Villages in the northern, Somerset part of the hills include Staple Fitzpaine, Buckland St Mary, Whitestaunton, Wambrook and Churchstanton. The larger, more southerly area in Devon includes Dunkeswell, Luppitt, Upottery, Smeatharpe, Hemyock, Blackborough, Yarcombe, Membury, Stockland, Sheldon, Cotleigh and Chardstock.

== Geology ==
The geology of the Blackdown Hills together with the adjoining East Devon AONB is unique in south-west England, forming part of the only extensive outcrop of Upper Greensand in the region.

The Blackdown Hills form a flat plateau dominated by hard chert bands, made up of clay with flints, of Upper Greensand with some remnants of chalk. The Cretaceous rocks rest over eroded Jurassic and Triassic beds, with an outcrop of Rhaetian beds. In the western areas the Upper Greensand is devoid of calcareous material but the sands yield fossils of marine bivalves and gastropods (snails) preserved in silica. A high proportion of the steeper slopes of the Blackdowns are affected by landslides, the long northern scarp of the range in particular. Typically there are patchy deposits of head (clays, sands and gravels of local origin) found beneath the affected sections of slopes.

== Climate ==
Along with the rest of south-west England, the Blackdown Hills have a temperate climate that is generally wetter and milder than the rest of England. The mean temperature is approximately 10 °C (50 °F) and shows a seasonal and a diurnal variation, but because of the modifying effect of the sea the range is less than in most other parts of the United Kingdom. January is the coldest month with mean minimum temperatures between 1 °C (34 °F) and 2 °C (36 °F). July and August are the warmest months, with mean daily maxima around 21 °C (70 °F). December is normally the most cloudy month and June the sunniest. High pressure over the Azores often brings clear skies to south-west England, particularly in summer.

The average annual sunshine totals around 1,600 hours. Rainfall tends to be associated with Atlantic depressions or with convection. In summer, convection caused by solar surface heating sometimes forms shower clouds, and a large proportion of rain falls from showers and thunderstorms at this time of year. Average rainfall is around 35–60 inches (890–1,520 mm). About 10–20 days of snowfall is typical. From November to March, mean wind speeds are highest; winds are lightest from June to August. The predominant wind direction is from the south-west.

Climate data for Dunkeswell 252m, 1981–2010
Month	Jan	Feb	Mar	Apr	May	Jun	Jul	Aug	Sep	Oct	Nov	Dec	Year
Mean daily maximum °C (°F)	6.7 (44.1)	6.7 (44.1)	9.0 (48.2)	11.4 (52.5)	14.7 (58.5)	17.4 (63.3)	19.4 (66.9)	19.1 (66.4)	16.7 (62.1)	12.9 (55.2)	9.5 (49.1)	6.9 (44.4)	12.6 (54.7)
Mean daily minimum °C (°F)	1.7 (35.1)	1.4 (34.5)	2.8 (37.0)	3.8 (38.8)	6.8 (44.2)	9.5 (49.1)	11.7 (53.1)	11.7 (53.1)	9.8 (49.6)	7.4 (45.3)	4.5 (40.1)	2.3 (36.1)	6.1 (43.0)
Average precipitation mm (inches)	112.5 (4.43)	82.7 (3.26)	79.9 (3.15)	75.0 (2.95)	72.3 (2.85)	66.0 (2.60)	66.8 (2.63)	73.8 (2.91)	81.6 (3.21)	117.6 (4.63)	115.9 (4.56)	121.2 (4.77)	1,065.3 (41.94)
Mean monthly sunshine hours	55.0	75.1	109.0	166.5	191.0	204.6	196.8	188.9	146.5	101.8	71.0	55.4	1,561.6

== Ecology ==
There are 16 Sites of Special Scientific Interest (SSSIs) in the Blackdown Hills ranging from the 156-hectare (390-acre) Black Down and Sampford Commons to Reed Farm pit at just less than 1-hectare (2.5-acre). This British conservation designation is administered in England by Natural England for areas with significant ecological characteristics deemed worthy of protection from inappropriate development or from other damage, and (since 2000) from neglect, under the Countryside and Rights of Way Act 2000. In total they cover 640 hectares (1,600 acres), or just under 2% of the AONB. Of these SSSIs, 79% were deemed by Natural England's predecessor body, English Nature to be being positively managed.

The grasslands, heathland, meadows and mire support extensive populations of birds such as barn owls (Tyto alba) and nightjar, with butterflies including marbled white (Melanargia galathea), green hairstreak (Callophrys rubi) and the gatekeeper butterfly (Pyronia tithonus). The flora includes the heath spotted-orchid (Dactylorhiza maculata), corky fruited water dropwort (Oenanthe pimpinelloides), green-winged orchid (Anacamptis morio), heather (Calluna vulgaris), lousewort (Pedicularis sylvatica) and bird's-foot trefoil (Lotus corniculatus). The hedgerows and woodlands are made up of ash, hazel (Corylus avellana), grey willow (Salix cinerea) and pedunculate oak (Quercus robur) which support populations of hazel dormouse (Muscardinus avellanarius), common lizards, siskin, stinking iris (Iris foetidissima) and the purple hairstreak butterfly (Neozephyrus quercus). The rivers and streams are home to kingfisher, otter and the Daubenton's bat.

Blackdown and Sampford Commons have extensive surviving examples of the heathland, carr woodland and marshy grassland habitats that have developed on the acidic soils overlying the Greensand and Keuper Marls of the Blackdown Hills. The heathland supports a typical invertebrate fauna, including a wide variety of butterfly species, and with spiders notably abundant. The site is regionally important for birds which favour heathland habitats.

Quants, a grassland clearing in a forestry plantation well known for its butterflies including Duke of Burgundy, marsh fritillary and wood white, is a candidate for Special Area of Conservation (cSAC). These are designated under the European Commission Habitats Directive (92/43/EEC) as internationally important habitats.

== History ==
Paleoenvironmental studies have shown that organic material began to accumulate on the Blackdown Hills in the Mesolithic and Neolithic periods with areas of open meadow, grass land with small woodland components being identified. There are several Bronze Age burial sites including Robin Hood's Butts near Otterford.

Notable archaeological sites include the Iron Age hill forts at Membury Castle, Hembury and Castle Neroche. Hembury is a Neolithic causewayed enclosure near Honiton. It dates to the late fifth and early fourth millennia BC and is believed to have been the capital of the Dumnonii tribe. The fort is situated on a promontory to the north of and overlooking the River Otter, Devon at approx 178 m (584 ft) above sea level. It has given its name to some of the earliest Neolithic pottery in southern Britain. An Iron Age hill fort was later built on the same site. There has been archaeological evidence found on the site of Roman military occupation, suggesting a fort within the existing Iron Age site. It is now a scheduled monument.

Fourteen hill slope enclosures, dating from the Iron Age have been identified on the Blackdown Hills, and prehistoric remains, from about 100 BC, have been found in Hemyock.

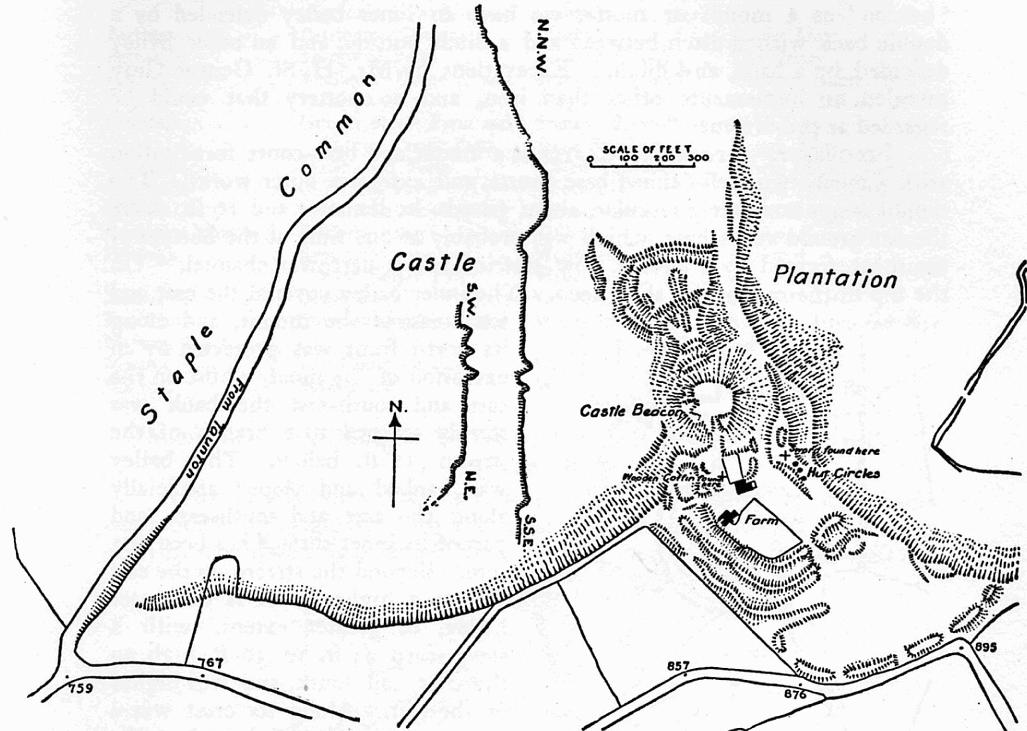
Earthworks at Castle Neroche

Castle Neroche is a Norman motte-and-bailey castle on the site of an earlier hill fort near Staple Fitzpaine. The hill rises to 260 metres (853 ft) on the northern escarpment of the Blackdown Hills. The castle was probably built by Robert of Mortain in the 11th century and probably went out of use in the 12th century. Around the crossroads at Staple Fitzpaine there are several large sandstone boulders. They are called devilstones and are said to have been thrown by the Devil from Castle Neroche. According to legend if you prick them with a pin they draw blood. English word 'Stapol' means pillar or post and it is thought likely that this gave the village the first part of its name. The second part of the name comes from the Fitzpaine family who owned the manor between 1233 and 1393.

A Roman bath house and Edwardian folly in the village of Whitestaunton were excavated by the archaeological television programme Time Team. There is also evidence of iron workings in the Romano-British period, at Dunkeswell, which radiocarbon dating has placed in the 2nd century. It has been suggested that these and other iron-based technologies gave the hills a fairly industrial landscape during the Romano-British period, providing a source of the name Blackdown Hills. Local iron ores were smelted at Hemyock in small bloomeries (furnaces) to produce pure iron until the Middle Ages.

At Simonsburrow a battle between the native Britons and King Ine's Saxon army, put an end (temporarily) to the Kings expansion to the west. In 710, Ine and Nothhelm fought against Geraint of Dumnonia, according to the Anglo-Saxon Chronicle; John of Worcester states that Geraint was killed in this battle. Ine's advance brought him control of what is now Devon, the new border with Dumnonia being the river Tamar.

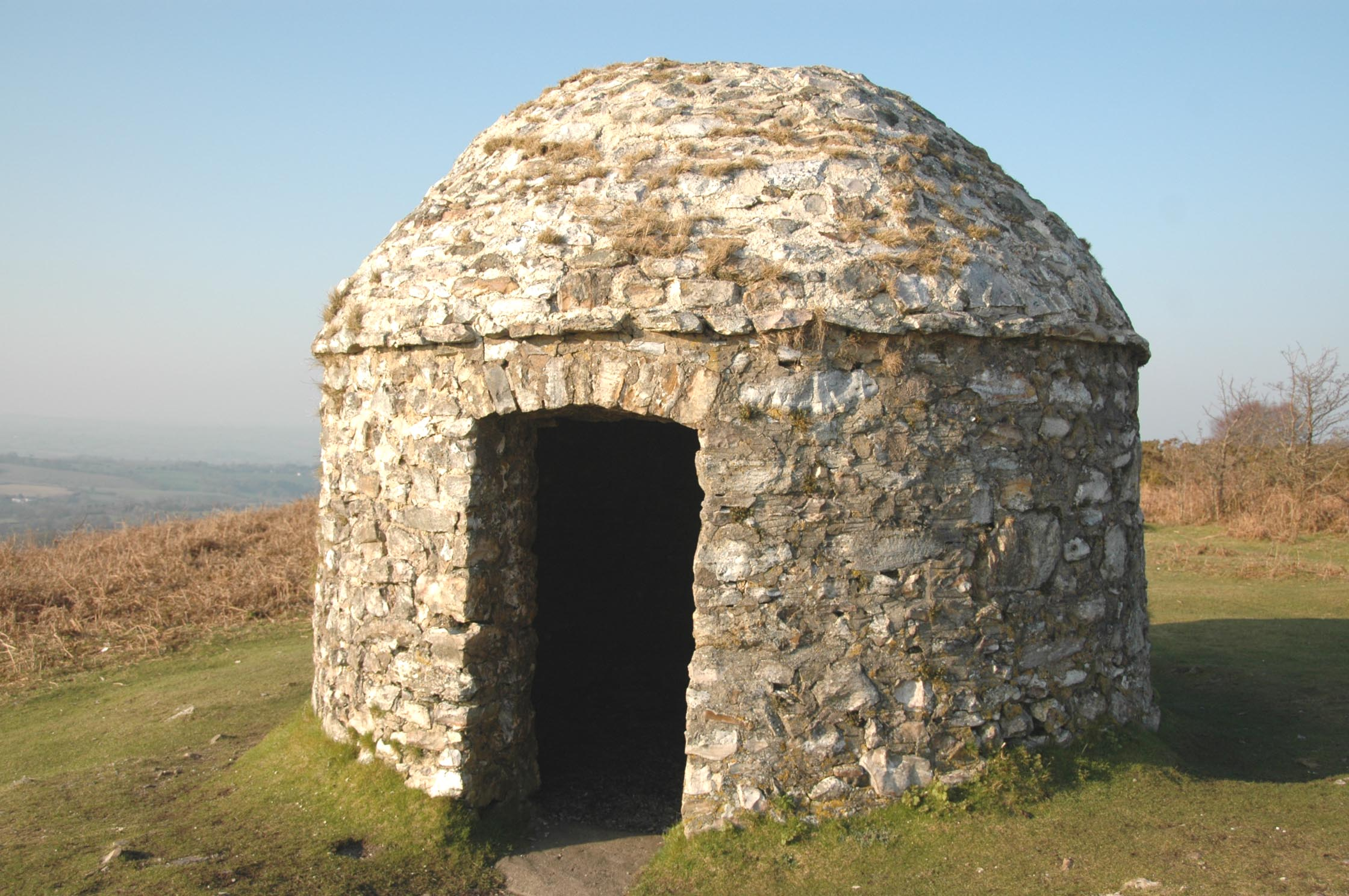
Stone structure built in 1588 to support a wooden pole and fire basket(s). Fire(s) would be lit as a signal that the Spanish Armada had been sighted. Of the chain of beacon sites across Southern England, this is the only remaining stone structure.

Just to the north of Culmstock, at Culmstock Beacon, is one of a chain of Elizabethan beacons built to warn of possible invasion by the Spanish Armada. On 5 November 1380, King Richard II granted Sir William and Lady Margaret Asthorpe a licence to crenellate the Hemyock manor house, meaning the permission to fortify it. Over the centuries, Hemyock Castle had many notable owners including Lord Chief Justice Sir John Popham. During the English Civil War it was held for Parliament, subjected to a brief but brutal siege and eventually slighted to destroy its military value. Parts of the castle walls, towers and moat still remain. They are a scheduled monument and include displays of history and archaeology. The castle was also owned by General Sir John Graves Simcoe the first lieutenant-governor of Upper Canada in 1792. He is buried at Wolford Chapel near Dunkeswell. The chapel is now owned by the Province of Ontario.

Early attempts were made by Charles I to enclose parts of the Blackdowns in the 1630s however this was opposed by the local lord and the commoners. He managed to enclose 1.634 acres (6,610 m^{2}) and soon sold these, but many of the hedges and fences were removed during the English Civil War. This was followed by further attempts at enclosure in 1658 but again only about a third was successfully enclosed, which remained the situation until 1833 when the rest of the hills were enclosed.

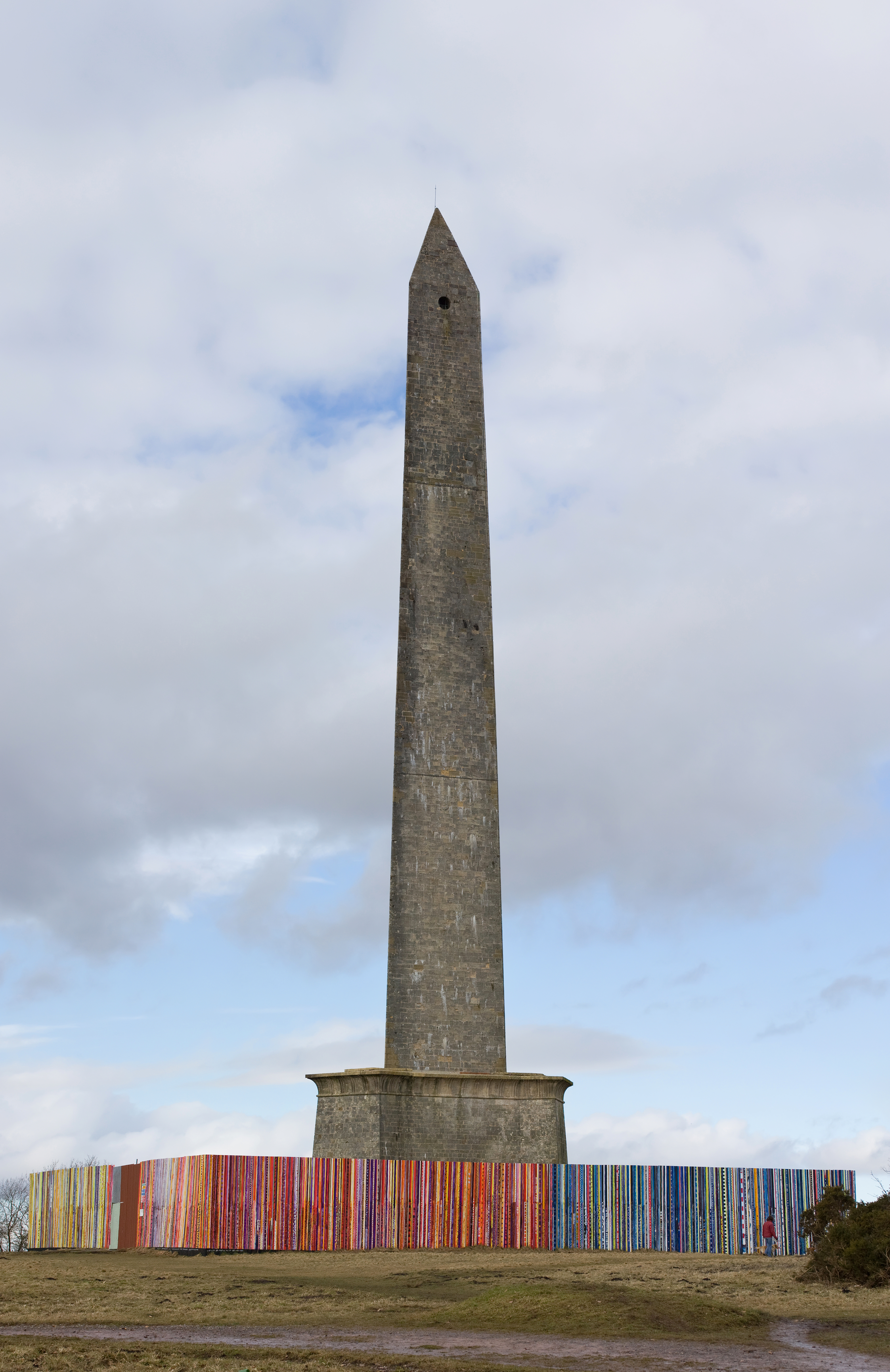
Wellington Monument

Coldharbour Mill was built around 1800 to exploit the available water power of the River Culm and was used for wool and yarn production until its commercial closure in 1981. It is now managed by an educational trust and plays a role in telling the industrial history of the area.

The Wellington Monument is located on Wellington Hill at grid reference ST137171, 3 km (1.9 mi) south of Wellington, Somerset. It was erected to celebrate the Duke of Wellington's victory at the Battle of Waterloo. The foundation stone was laid in 1817, on land belonging to the Duke, but the monument was not completed until 1854. Its design was inspired by an Egyptian obelisk, but in the shape of the type of bayonet used by Wellington's armies. It is now owned by the National Trust, and is floodlit at night.

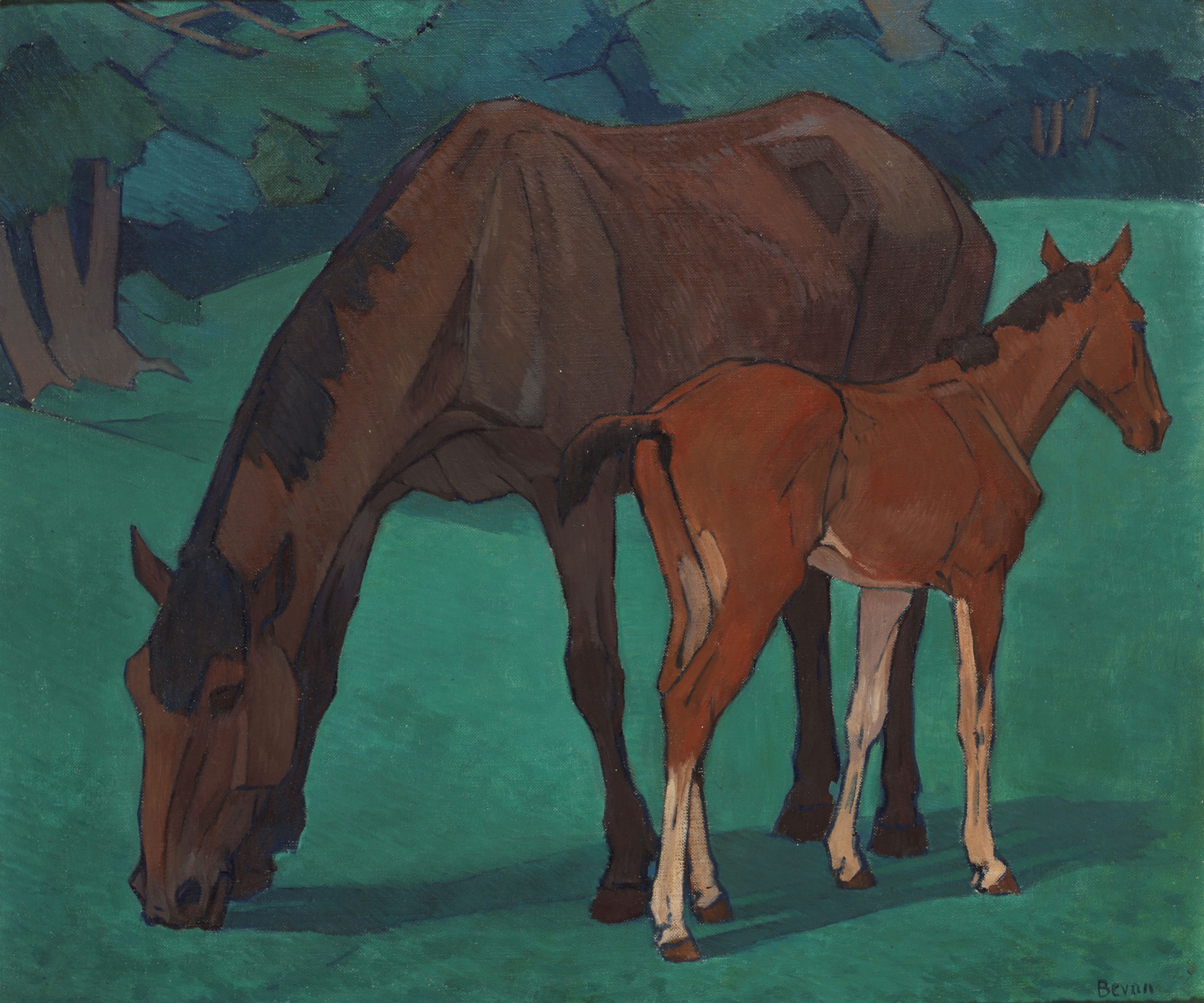
Mare and Foal, 1917, by Robert Bevan

The artist Robert Polhill Bevan worked in the Blackdown Hills from 1912 to 1925 as a guest of landowner and amateur artist Harold Harrison. Until the end of his life Bevan continued to paint in the Bolham valley and nearby Luppitt his angular style sitting well with the strong patterning of the landscape. Many of the images that he produced in the area are now in national museums.

In the Second World War, airbases were built at Dunkeswell, Upottery and Culmhead. Dunkeswell Aerodrome (IATA: N/A, ICAO: EGTU) was built in the Second World War by the RAF, briefly used by the USAF, and then the Fleet Airwing 7 of the USN. It was the only American Navy air base commissioned on UK soil during the Second World War.

According to local legend, the Holman Clavel Inn is the home of a hearth spirit called Chimbley Charlie.

== Government and politics ==
The Blackdown Hills have, since 1991, been designated as an Area of Outstanding Natural Beauty (AONB; since 2023 a National Landscape). As they have the same landscape quality, National Landscapes may be compared to the national parks of England and Wales. National Landscapes are created under the same legislation as the national parks: the National Parks and Access to the Countryside Act 1949. However, National Parks, unlike National Landscapes, have their own authorities and have special legal powers to prevent unsympathetic development. By contrast, there are very limited statutory duties imposed on local authorities within a National Landscape. Further regulation and protection of AONBs/National Landscapes was added by the Countryside and Rights of Way Act 2000.

The total population of the Blackdown Hills AONB in 2001 was 13,300; of which 10,500 lived in Devon and 2,800 within Somerset. Many of the villages have their own parish councils which have some responsibility for local issues. The Blackdown Hills National Landscape is managed by a partnership of public bodies, local organisations and voluntary groups with an active interest in the hills. Funding is provided by Devon and Somerset County Councils, East Devon and Mid Devon councils and the Department for Environment, Food and Rural Affairs.

The National Landscape straddles the borders of three parliamentary constituencies: Honiton and Sidmouth, Taunton and Wellington and Yeovil.

== Religious sites ==
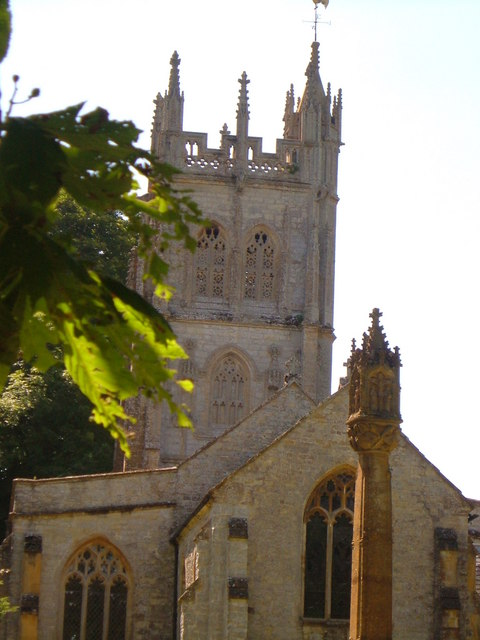
The Church of St Peter in Staple Fitzpaine

Dunkeswell Abbey, a Cistercian monastery and offshoot of Forde Abbey, was founded in 1201 by William Briwere. The abbey was closed in 1539 and granted to Lord Russell. It was mostly demolished promptly, though a section remained in domestic use until the 19th century. In 1842, a parish church was built on a part of the site. Some surviving fragments of monastery include the partial end wall of the cellarers range and parts of a gatehouse. Some carved fragments survive within the Victorian era church.

The Church of St Peter in Staple Fitzpaine was originally built in the Norman style, and has a Norman doorway reset in the south aisle. The chancel dates from the 14th century; the north aisle was added and the church refenestrated in the 15th century. The tower dates from about 1500. The south porch and the vestry are much more recent, dating from 1841. The crenellated 3-stage tower, has merlons pierced with trefoil headed arches set on a quatrefoil pierced parapet. The church has been designated by English Heritage as a grade I listed building.

== Transport ==
The Blackdown Hills are crossed by a network of minor roads. There are several major roads including the A30, A303 and A35. The M5 motorway is at the northwestern boundary of the National Landscape. The Bristol to Exeter line and the remains of the Grand Western Canal run, quite close in places, to the west of the M5 motorway but do not pass through the Blackdown Hills. The West of England Main Line passes through the southern part of the hills between Axminster and Honiton, including a tunnel section east of Honiton.

The Culm Valley Light Railway opened in 1876, having been built by local enterprise. The line was purchased by the Great Western Railway, which had operated it from the start, in 1880. The line closed to passengers in 1963 but served the milk depot at Hemyock until its closure in 1975.

Dunkeswell Aerodrome (IATA: N/A, ICAO: EGTU) is now a busy civilian airfield with a mix of light aircraft, microlights and parachuting.

== Economy ==
The Blackdown Hills National Landscape is unique in that there are no towns or cities within its boundary. Employment opportunities are concentrated in the surrounding towns and in a number of small-scale industrial parks — notably around Dunkeswell airfield. A resurgence of interest in local and sustainable food production has led to significant growth in the number and variety of small-scale food and drink businesses in the area in recent years. Tourism is also a significant contributor to the local economy with visitors attracted by activities such as walking and riding.

The Blackdown Hills Business Association was established as a member organisation in 2002 to encourage and support all businesses that are based in or serve the Blackdown Hills. Membership stands at around 400 businesses.

== Principal summits ==
The following hills within the National Landscape have at least 30 metres topographic prominence:

1. Staple Hill (315.7m)
2. North Hill (285.9m)
3. Buckland Hill (Wellington) (280.4m)
4. Buckland Hill (Buckland St Mary) (280m)
5. Beacon Hill (272m)
6. Wellington Hill (272m)
7. Sampford Common (269.6m)
8. Dumpdon Hill (261m)
9. The Downs (251m)
10. Horner Hill (221.8m)
11. Rower Hill (211m)
12. Danes Hill (192m)
13. Profits Down Hill (166m)
14. Orchard Wood (124m)

== See also ==
- List of Sites of Special Scientific Interest in Somerset
- List of Sites of Special Scientific Interest in Devon
