= Craig Llysfaen =

Hill in Caerphilly County Borough, Wales

Coordinates: 51.55872°N 3.16986°W

View north

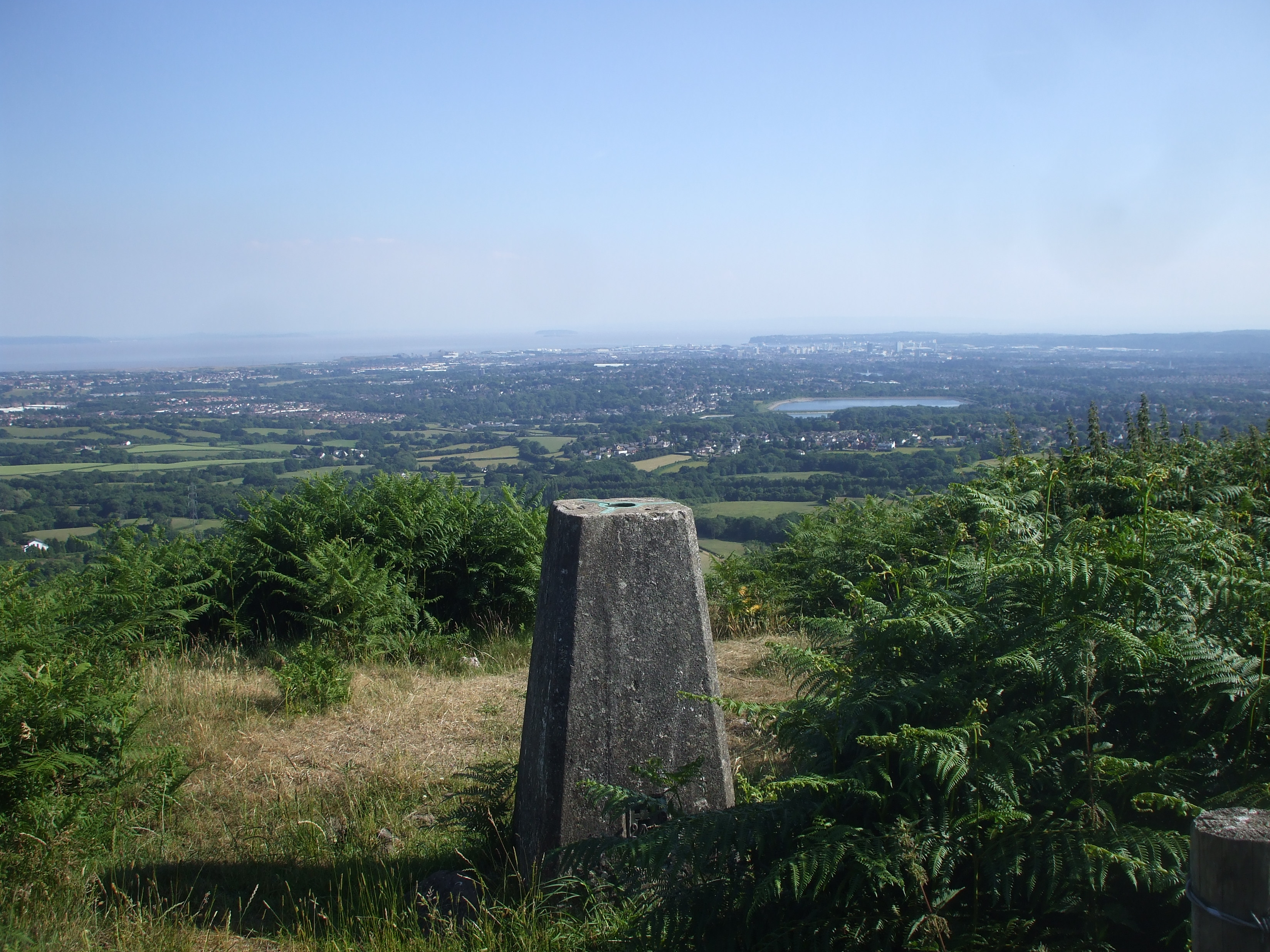
View south from the Trig Point on Craig Llysfaen

Craig Llysfaen, also known as Lisvane Graig, is a prominent hill overlooking Cardiff, some 7 miles north of the city centre. It has an elevation of 264 m (866 ft) and a prominence of 55 m (180 ft), and is the highest point in South Glamorgan.

The views (on a good day) include Newport City, the two Severn bridges to the east, Pen Y Fan and the Brecon Beacons to the north and Cardiff City to the south.
