= Dumpdon Hill =

Iron Age hill fort in Devon, England

Coordinates: 50°49′50″N 3°10′17″W

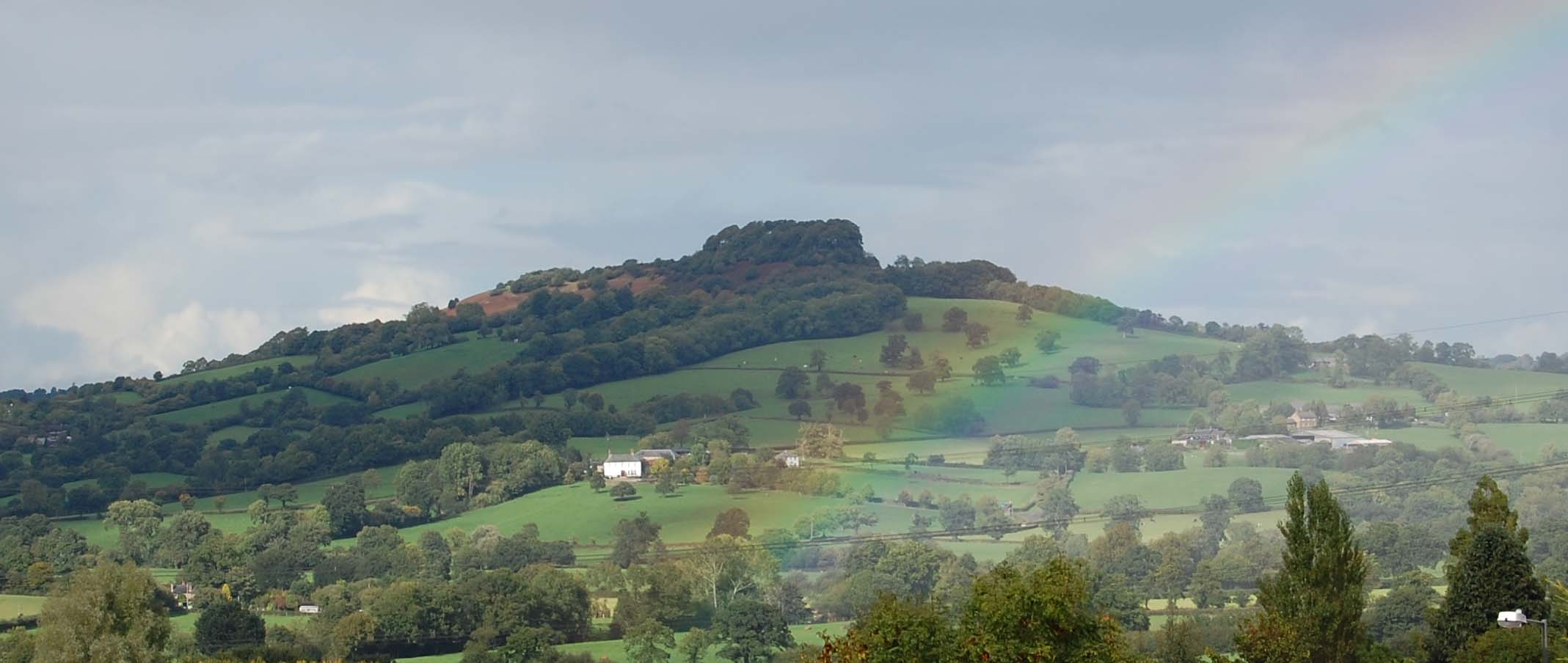
A view of Dumpdon Hill.

Dumpdon Hill is an Iron Age Hill Fort near Honiton in Devon. Somewhat overshadowed by its better known neighbour Hembury Fort it is nonetheless as impressive an earthwork.

Situated above the valley of the River Otter, it is one of the largest, and most distinct hills in the area due to a large clump of beech trees situated at its summit. The top of Dumpdon is owned and maintained by the National Trust and is 250 metres (800 ft) above sea level.
