= Haddon Hill =

Ridge in Somerset, England

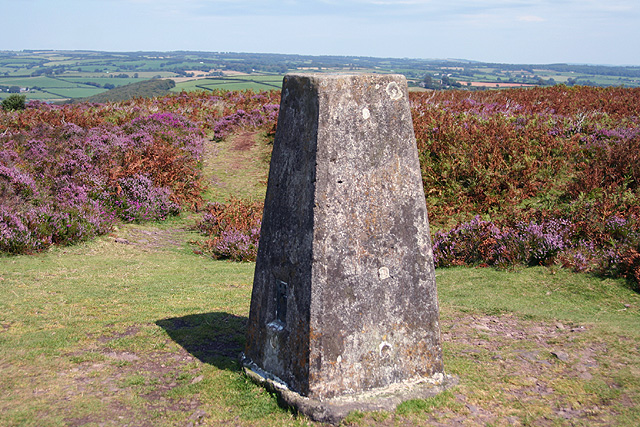
- The trig point on the top of Haddon Hill

Highest point
- Elevation: 1,164 ft (355 m)
- Coordinates: 51°03′N 3°29′W

Geography
- Location: Somerset, England
- OS grid: SS962286

Haddon Hill is a prominent east–west aligned ridge in west Somerset, England, close to Hartford within the civil parish of Brompton Regis. It lies on the south-eastern fringe of Exmoor National Park though is separated from the Exmoor massif itself by the valleys of the rivers Haddeo and Exe The highest point of the ridge at OS grid reference SS 962286 is crowned by a trig point at 1,164 feet (355 m) above sea level. Much of the upper part of the hill is mapped as open access under the Countryside and Rights of Way Act 2000 and hence available for public access on foot. A couple of public footpaths traverse the hill north–south whilst numerous tracks run along its length. The larger part of the hill is within the national park, the boundary of which runs along the B3190 road which runs diagonally across the eastern end of the ridge en route from Watchet to Bampton. Vehicular access is available off this road. The hill affords views across Wimbleball Reservoir which occupies the Haddeo valley immediately to its north.

Along with its eastern neighbour, Heydon Hill, Haddon Hill is largely formed from the Pickwell Down Sandstones, a thick sequence of Devonian age sedimentary rocks. The stone has been quarried in the past.

A tree ring, surrounded by a bank and ditch, on the hill was previously thought to be a Bronze Age tumulus although this is no longer the case. There is a Bronze Age cairn which is 9.3 metres (31 ft) in diameter. Several Roman coins have been found at Hadborough at the western end of Haddon Hill.

During World War II a military camp was built on the hill with several buildings to accommodate soldiers from the United States Army during the buildup to the Normandy landings in 1944.
