= Staple Hill (Somerset) =

Hill in Somerset, England

Coordinates: 50.94381°N 3.08314°W

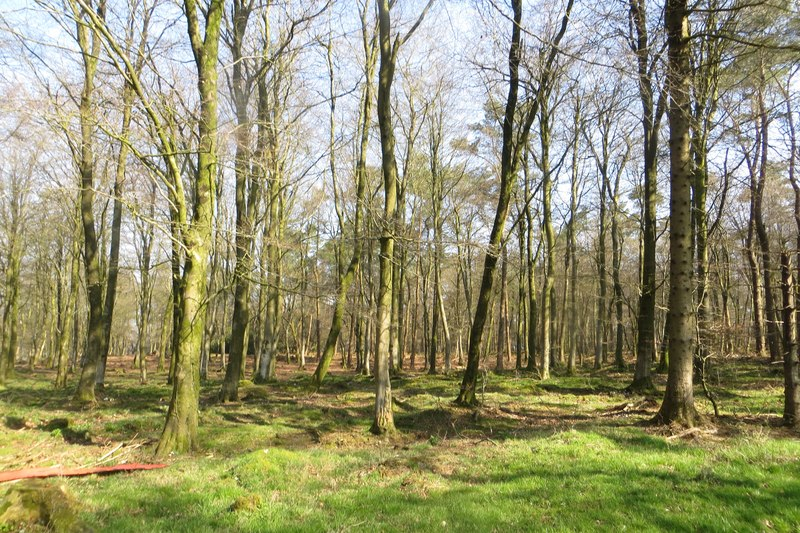
- Staple Hill Plantations

Highest point
- Elevation: 315 m (1,033 ft)
- Prominence: 212 m (696 ft)
- Parent peak: Dunkery Beacon
- Listing: Marilyn, Hardy

Geography
- Location: Blackdown Hills, England
- OS grid: ST240166
- Topo map: OS Landranger 193

Staple Hill is a hill in the English county of Somerset, the highest point in the Blackdown Hills. It is classed as both a Marilyn and a Hardy.

This is one of the points on the Staple Fitzpaine Herepath a part of Forestry England woodlands.

There is a loop walk, starting from the car parking area, of 800m taking in a couple of view points with the paths upgraded early in 2009 to be suitable for disabled access.
