= Membury Castle =

Iron Age hill fort in Devon, England

Coordinates: 50.821°N 3.019°W

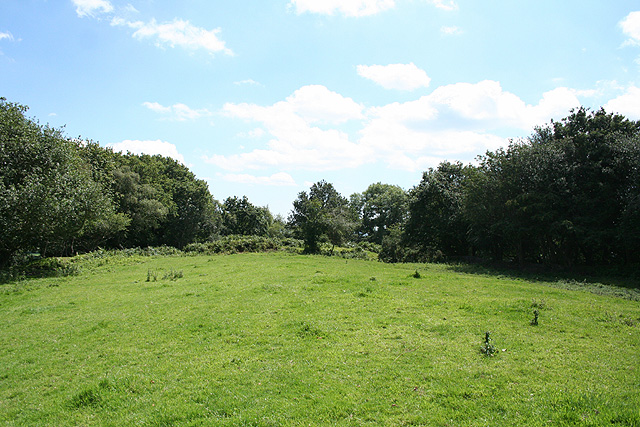
inside Membury Castle

Membury Castle is an Iron Age hillfort situated above the village of Membury in Devon. The fort occupies a commanding hilltop position some 204 metres (669 ft) above sea level with views across both the Yarty and Axe valleys.
