= Black Down, Somerset =

One of the Mendip Hills in Somerset, England

Coordinates: 51.31156°N 2.74170°W

Black Down
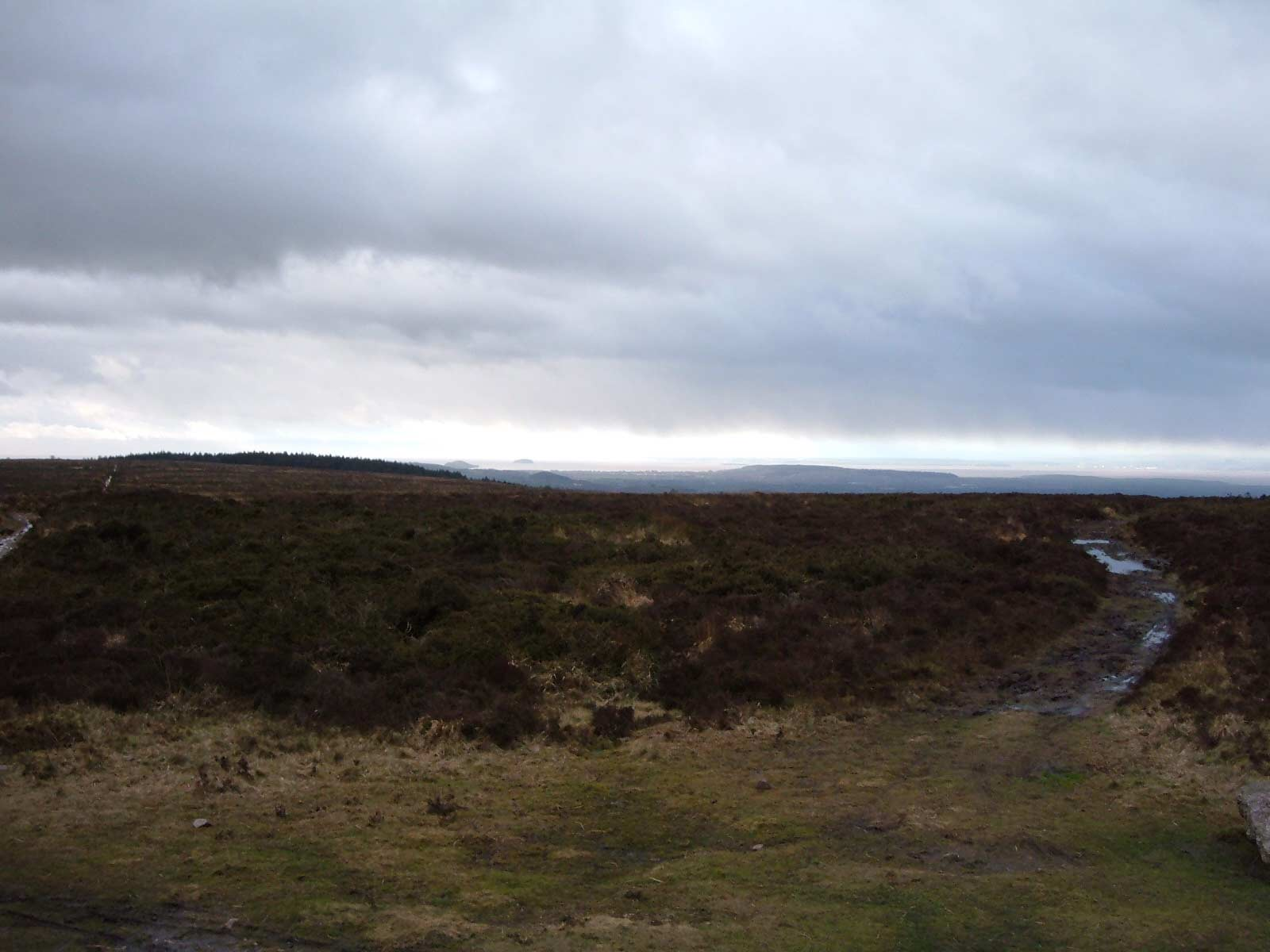
- A view across Black Down from Beacon Batch in the Mendip Hills

Highest point
- Elevation: 325 m (1,066 ft)
- Prominence: c. 241 m
- Parent peak: The Wrekin
- Listing: Marilyn

Geography
- Location: Mendip Hills, England
- OS grid: ST484572
- Topo map: OS Landranger 141

Black Down is the highest hill in the Mendip Hills, Somerset, in south-western England. Black Down lies just a few miles eastward of the Bristol Channel at Weston-super-Mare, and provides a view over the Chew Valley. The summit is marked with an Ordnance Survey trig point, the base of which has been rebuilt by the Mendip Hills AONB authority.

The shortest route of ascent goes from the Burrington Combe car park and is approximately 1 km long.

Black Down is an open-access area mostly consisting of moors, with dense cover of associated vegetation such as heather and bracken. According to a local organization's newsletter, the name "Black Down" comes from the Saxon word 'Blac' or 'Bloec' meaning bleak, 'Dun' meaning down or fort.

== Geology ==
The rocks form an anticline with the oldest being Old Red Sandstone at the summit, which was deposited during the Devonian period between 400 and 362 million years ago, with younger Portishead Beds of limestone and Black Nore Sandstone on either side. As a result of the Variscan mountain-building, the Mendip area now comprises at least four anticlinal fold structures, with an east-west trend, each with a core of older Devonian sandstone and Silurian volcanic rocks.

The Devonian and Silurian rocks are generally more resistant to weathering than the limestone, and form some of the highest points on the hills, including the highest at Black Down, 325 metres (1068 ft) above sea level. Black Down is a moorland area, with its steeper slopes covered in bracken (Pteridium) and its flatter summit in heather (Calluna) and grasses rather than the pasture which covers much of the plateau.

== Beacon Batch round barrow cemetery ==
The summit area of Black Down is known as Beacon Batch. It is the site of Bronze Age round barrows, one of which also anchors the concrete trig point. All of the barrows show signs of being opened in the past, but the only recorded excavation was done by Rev J. Skinner in 1820.

The main group of barrows consists of nine bowl barrows, one bell barrow and one disc barrow. There is also an outlying group of three bowl barrows to the west, and a group of two bowl barrows about 600 metres (0.37 mi) to the southeast of the main group.

== Bombing decoy town ==
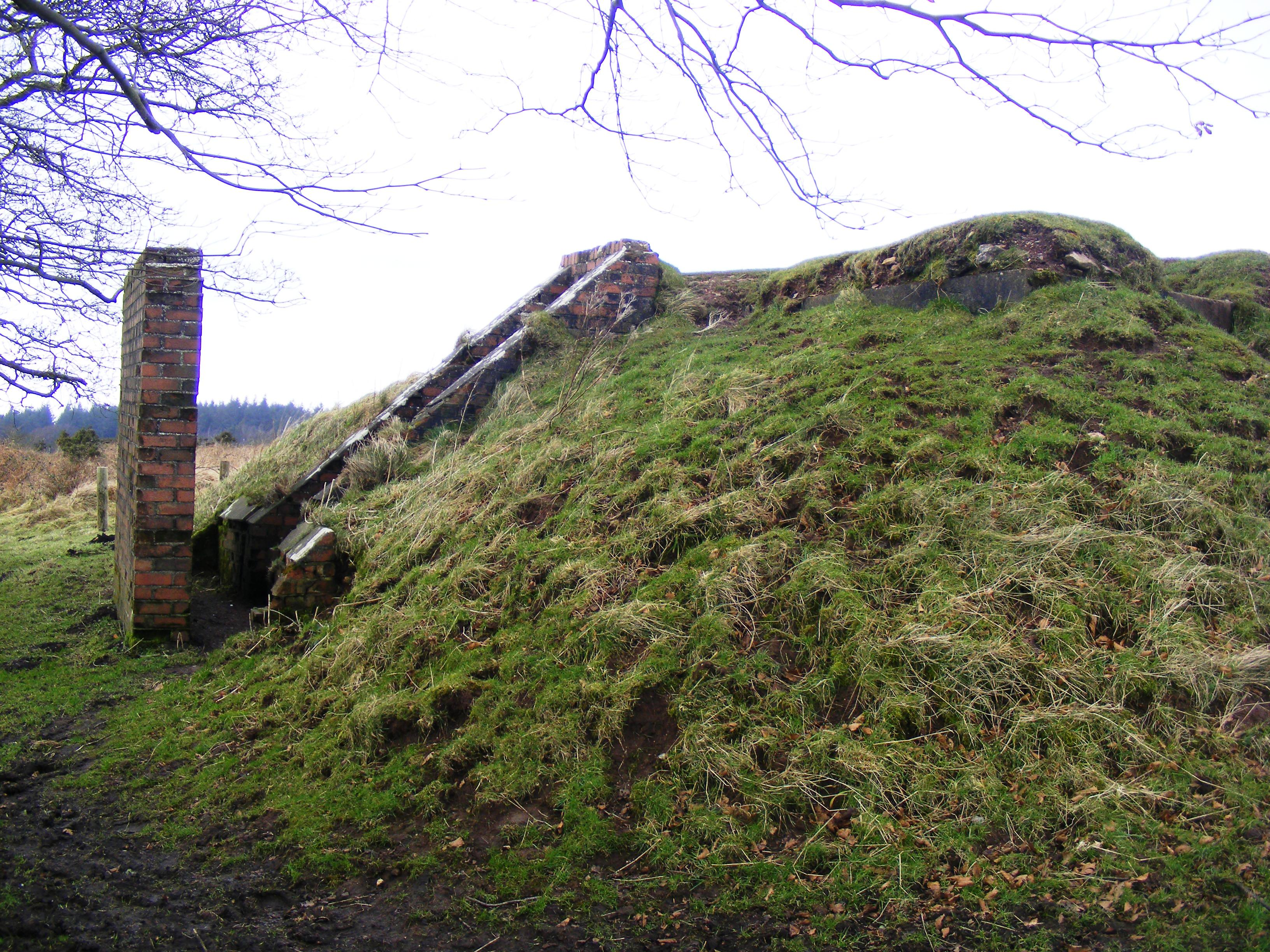
World War II bunker

During World War II a bombing decoy town was constructed on Black Down, which was intended to represent the blazing lights of a town which had omitted to follow black-out regulations. The decoy, known under the code name Starfish from the original code SF (Special Fire) used fires of creosote and water to simulate incendiary bombs exploding. In addition glow boxes were used to simulate the streets and railways of Bristol, the light bulbs were powered by electrical generators, powered by Coventry Climax petrol engines contained in two bunkers. It was laid out by Shepperton Film Studios, based on aerial photographs of the city's railway marshalling yards.

The decoys were fitted with dim red lights, simulating activities like the stoking of steam locomotives. Burning bales of straw soaked in creosote were used to simulate the effects of incendiary bombs dropped by the first wave of Pathfinder night bombers; meanwhile, incendiary bombs dropped on the correct location were quickly smothered, wherever possible. Drums of oil were also ignited to simulate the effect of a blazing city or town, with the aim of fooling subsequent waves of bombers into dropping their bombs on the wrong location. The site was home to a Z battery of anti aircraft rockets. The success of this endeavour is questionable, with no ground indications that the hills were used as targets. Piles of stones (known as cairns) were also created to prevent enemy aircraft from using the hilltop as a landing site.

== Heritage at Risk ==
Both the World War II bombing decoy complex and round barrow cemetery are included on the Heritage at Risk Register maintained by English Heritage due to erosion from the visitors to the site.

A three-year project from 2013 to 2016 has been funded by the Heritage Lottery Fund, and hosted by the Mendip Hills Area of Outstanding Natural Beauty Unit, has been established to "raise awareness of the importance of Black Down and the Burrington Commons".
