= Dunkery Hill =

Hill in Somerset, England

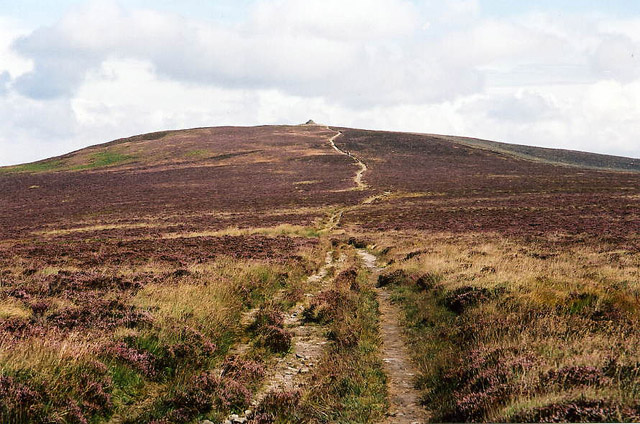
- Dunkery Beacon seen on the ascent up the western slopes

Highest point
- Elevation: 519 m (1,703 ft)
- Prominence: 414 m (1,358 ft)
- Parent peak: High Willhays
- Listing: Marilyn, County Top
- Coordinates: 51.16197°N 3.58736°W

Geography
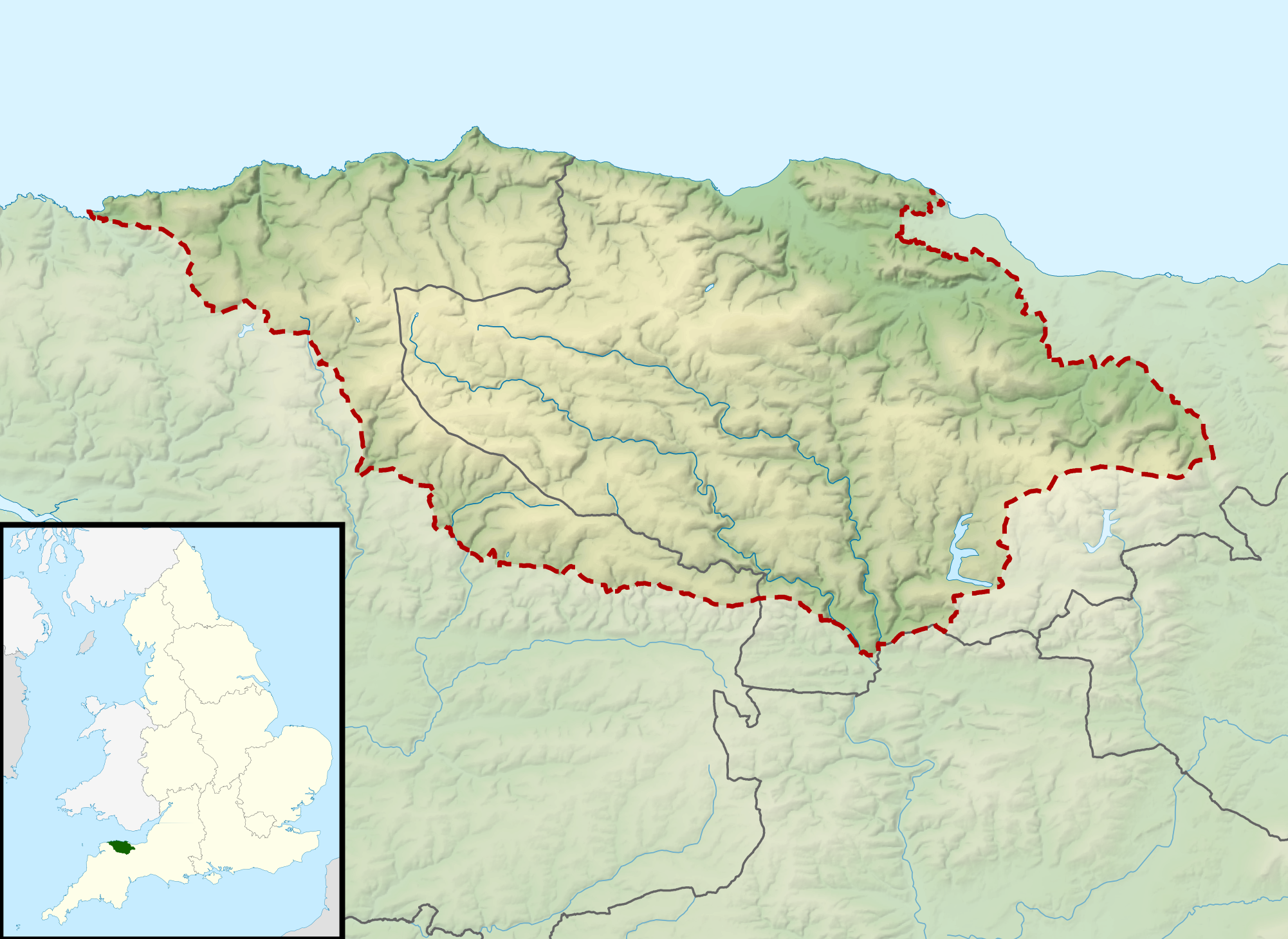
- Location within Exmoor
- Location: Exmoor, England
- OS grid: SS891415
- Topo map: OS Landranger 181

Dunkery Beacon at the summit of Dunkery Hill is the highest point on Exmoor and in Somerset, England. It is also the highest point in southern England outside of Dartmoor.

The sandstone hill rises to 519 metres (1,703 ft) and provides views over the surrounding moorland, the Bristol Channel and hills up to 86 miles (138 km) away. The site has been visited by humans since the Bronze Age, and contains several burial mounds in the form of cairns and bowl barrows. Sweetworthy on the lower slopes is the site of two Iron Age hill forts or enclosures and a deserted medieval settlement. The hill is part of a Site of Special Scientific Interest and National nature reserve. It was in private ownership until the 20th century, when it was donated to the National Trust by Sir Thomas Acland, Colonel Wiggin and Allan Hughes; a stone cairn was erected at the summit to commemorate the event.

== Location ==
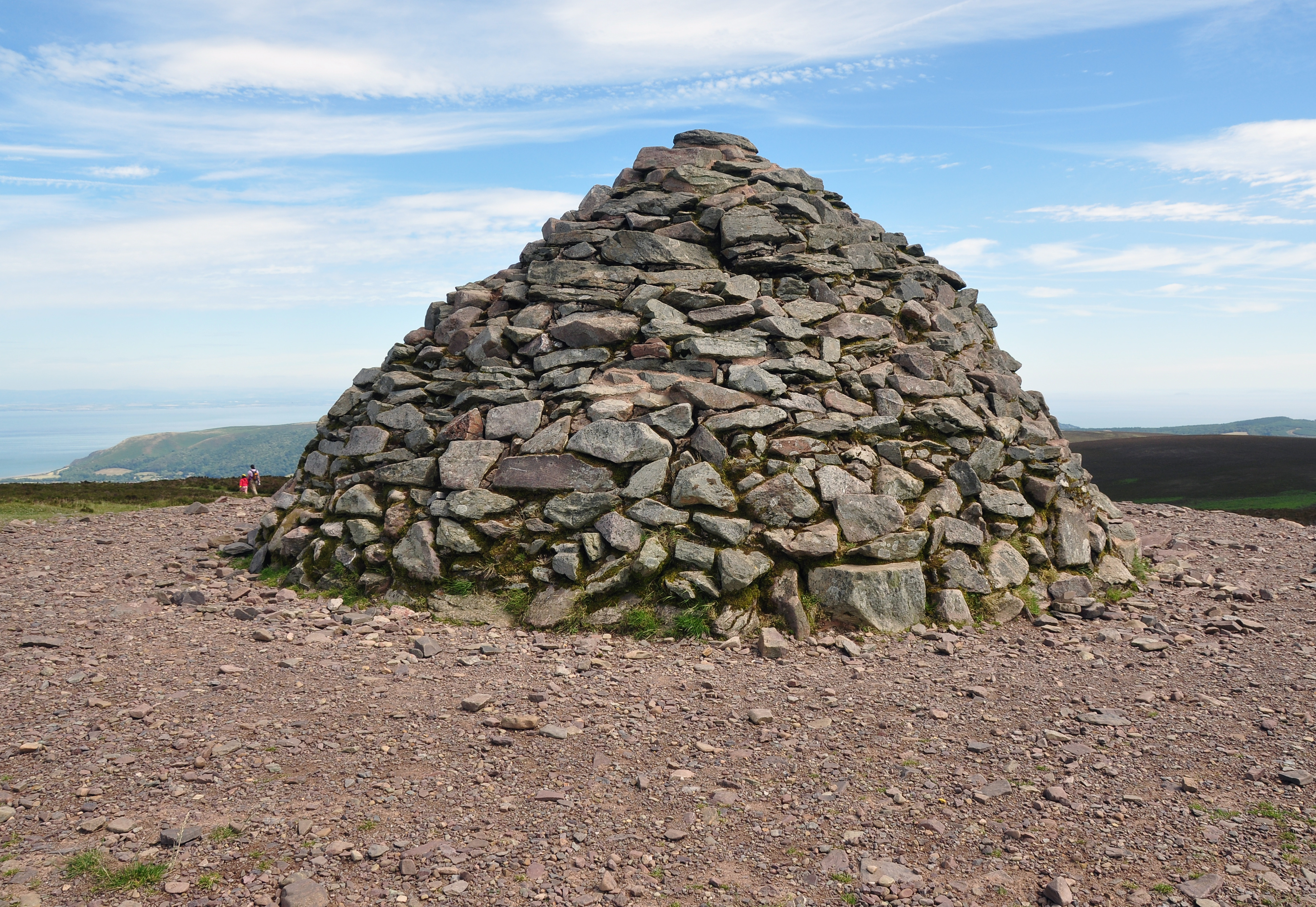
The summit cairn

Dunkery is composed of Middle Devonian sedimentary rock, (393.47± 0.99 million years ago) known as the Hangman Sandstone Formation. This supports acidic soils. The ridge along the top of the hill is 4.5 kilometres (2.8 mi) long.

At 519 metres (1,703 ft) ordnance datum (OD), the mean height above sea level, Dunkery Beacon is the highest natural point in Somerset, although the Mendip TV Mast is higher at 589 metres (1,932 ft) OD. Dunkery is ranked 23rd in the UK in terms of dominance and is a Marilyn, meaning that it is a peak with 150 metres (490 ft) or more of relative height. The nearest higher hill is Yes Tor, 37 miles (60 km) away. John Fry, a character in R. D. Blackmore's 1869 novel Lorna Doone, calls it the "haighest place of Hexmoor".

Dunkery lies just four miles (6.4 km) from the Bristol Channel at Porlock. The shortest route of ascent goes from the car park at Dunkery Gate, and is just 0.75 miles (1.2 km) long. There are extensive views from the summit, from where the Bristol and English Channel coasts, the Brecon Beacons including Pen Y Fan, Bodmin Moor, Dartmoor, the Severn Bridges and Cleeve Hill 86 miles (138 km) away in Gloucestershire are visible.

== History ==
Dunkery Hill was part of the "Royal Forest of Exmoor", established by Henry II according to the late 13th-century Hundred Rolls. There has been some debate about the origin of the name "Dunkery" and its predecessors "Duncrey" and "Dunnecray". Eilert Ekwall suggests that it comes from the Welsh din meaning hillfort and creic or creag meaning rock.

There are several Bronze Age burial mounds at or near the summit. Two of the largest are Joaney How and Robin How, which have been damaged over many years, although plans have been made to restore and protect them. "How" comes from the Norse for burial mound. Joaney How on the northern slope, is more than 22 metres (72 ft) in diameter. On the southeastern slopes are four more cairns, and there are a further two round cairns 390 metres (1,280 ft) and 420 metres (1,380 ft) southeast of Rex Stile Head. In addition to the cairns are barrows, which also date from the Bronze Age. One bowl barrow on the southeastern spur of the Chains is 12.3 metres (40 ft) in diameter. A circular funerary stone mound 850 metres (2,790 ft) north of Dunkery Bridge, which is a 1.5-mile (2.4 km) walk from the summit, dates from the Neolithic or Bronze Age. It is approximately 1.5 metres (4 ft 11 in) high and 14 metres (46 ft) in diameter.

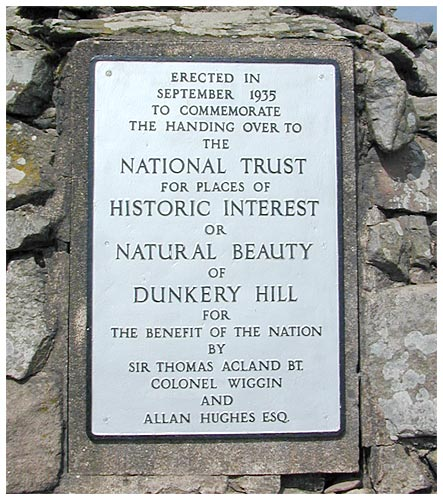
The National Trust plaque on the summit

Sweetworthy, on Dunkery Hill's north-facing slope, is the site of two Iron Age hillforts or enclosures; one has a single rampart and external ditch, enclosing 0.25 hectares (0.62 acres). The rampart is still visible, and the ditch on the east side is used as a trackway. There was a defended settlement above the main site. It is also the site of a deserted medieval settlement, which has been designated a scheduled monument. It has been added to the Heritage at Risk Register because of the vulnerability to plant growth.

In 1918 Sir Thomas Acland granted to the National Trust a 500-year lease of a large part of the Holnicote Estate, including Dunkery Hill. Dunkery Hill was put up for sale in 1928. Labour Party activist and Member of Parliament Margaret Bondfield asked in the House of Commons if the government was willing to have it designated an ancient monument, to preserve it for future generations. She received the reply that although the government was agreeable to having the hill listed there were no funds available for its purchase; the beacon and surrounding mounds were subsequently designated an ancient monument. The beacon itself, and 960 acres (390 ha) of surrounding land, was donated in 1932 by Colonel W.W. Wiggin. A further 945 acres (382 ha) of nearby land was donated in 1934 by Mrs Hughes in memory of her husband Alan Hughes of Lynch Allerford, Minehead. The donations were commemorated in 1935 with an event when a plaque was attached to the summit memorial cairn. Further parts of the Holnicote Estate, which includes other land donated by the Acland family and others, was given in subsequent years.

== Ecology ==
The site is part of the North Exmoor Site of Special Scientific Interest (SSSI), part of the Dunkery and Horner Wood National Nature Reserve and part of the Exmoor Coastal Heaths Special Area of Conservation.

The hill is blanketed in heather, which gives it a deep purple colour during the summer. Ling and bell heather, gorse, sessile oak, ash, rowan, hazel, bracken, mosses, liverworts, lichens and ferns all grow on the hill or in surrounding woodland, as well as some unique whitebeam species. Exmoor ponies, red deer, pied flycatchers, wood warblers, lesser spotted woodpeckers, redstarts, dippers, snipe, skylarks and kestrels are some of the fauna to be found on or around the hill and in nearby Horner Woods, home to 14 of the 16 UK bat species and including barbastelle and Bechstein's bats.
