= Northumberland Coast =

Northumberland Coast may refer to:

- Northumberland Coast National Landscape, an Area of Outstanding Natural Beauty in England.
- Northumberland Coast Path, long-distance footpath in England.
- Northumberland coastal plains
  - North Northumberland Coastal Plain
  - South East Northumberland Coastal Plain
