= Geography of Lincolnshire =

The ceremonial county of Lincolnshire (composed of the shire county of Lincolnshire, plus the unitary authorities of North Lincolnshire and North-East Lincolnshire) is the second largest of the English counties and one that is predominantly agricultural in character. Despite its relatively large physical area, it has a comparatively small population (of less than 1 million people). The unusually low population density that arises gives the county a very different character from the much more densely populated and urbanised counties of south-east and northern England, and is, in many ways, key to understanding the nature of the county (and perhaps even its people).

== Classification ==
For the purposed of a general geographical classification the county can be broken down into a number of sub-regions:

- The Lincolnshire coast.
- Lincolnshire Fens: a region of flat, marshy land (much of it reclaimed from the sea) that predominates in the southern and south-eastern areas of the county (most particularly around the local towns of Boston and Spalding and extending around The Wash to the county border with Norfolk.
  - The Witham Valley which extends the low-lying nature of the fens toward the city. Historically important for abbey and prehistoric usage.
- The Lincolnshire Marsh: reclaimed salt marsh in the east of the county, north of the Fens.
- The Lincolnshire Wolds: a range of low hills that run broadly south-east through the central and eastern portion of the county.
- The Lincoln Cliff: a jurassic escarpment forming a major feature facing the Wolds.
- The industrial Humber Estuary and north-east coast: the major population and industrial centres of North and North East Lincolnshire. These include the major fishing port of Grimsby and nearby Immingham (an important centre for the chemical industry) - both towns are on Humber, which flows into the North Sea). Also included is the nearby industrial town of Scunthorpe, a once important steel producing town, but now somewhat in post-industrial decline.
- The vale of the River Trent in the west of the county, bordering Nottinghamshire.
- The Isle of Axholme in the north west.

The highest point of the county is just to the north of the village of Normanby le Wold, in the Lincolnshire Wolds north-east of Market Rasen. Marked by a trig point, it is 168m/551 ft high and is a Marilyn.

== The Greenwich Meridian ==
The Greenwich Meridian runs through the county. It extends from the Humber Estuary between Cleethorpes and Humberston at 53°33′14″N 00°00′00″W^{1} and passes through Louth and Boston before leaving the county south of Gedney Hill at 52°39′49″N 00°00′00″W^{1}.
