= Mid Northumberland =

National Character Area in Northern England

Mid Northumberland NCA
- Ceremonial county: Northumberland
- Country: England
- Sovereign state: United Kingdom

Mid Northumberland NCA is a National Character Area in Northern England between the Northumberland Sandstone Hills and the North Northumberland Coastal Plain. It is bordered to the south by the Hadrian's Wall World Heritage Site. Ridges and river valleys dominate the region in the northern and western regions, where the NCA borders the uplands in northwestern Northumberland; lowlands and plains dominate the landscape in the south as the land rolls toward the Tyneside Lowlands.

== Settlement ==
According to Natural England, modern settlement closely follows a medieval pattern of nucleation as is common in Western Europe, much of which was established and planned in the 12th and 13th centuries. This leads to small villages sited on ridges in the south-west or at the crossing points of rivers, and houses clustered around greens where stock were kept relatively safe from border raids. Due to its low population density, Northumberland is home to many country houses. In terms of agriculture, the lowlands regions in the south are home to crop farming and cattle herding; meanwhile in the uplands of the north and west shepherding is more common.

== Hydrology ==
Many rivers flow through the region as they go to meet the River Tyne in the south. The Coquet flows down from the Cheviots and the Rivers Font, Wansbeck, and Blyth flow from the Sandstone Hills. The region is also known, according to Natural England, for an "unusual amount of open waters" for Northumberland, with lakes dotting the countryside.
