= Eastern Ore Mountains Nature Park =

Nature park in the Czech Republic

Eastern Ore Mountains
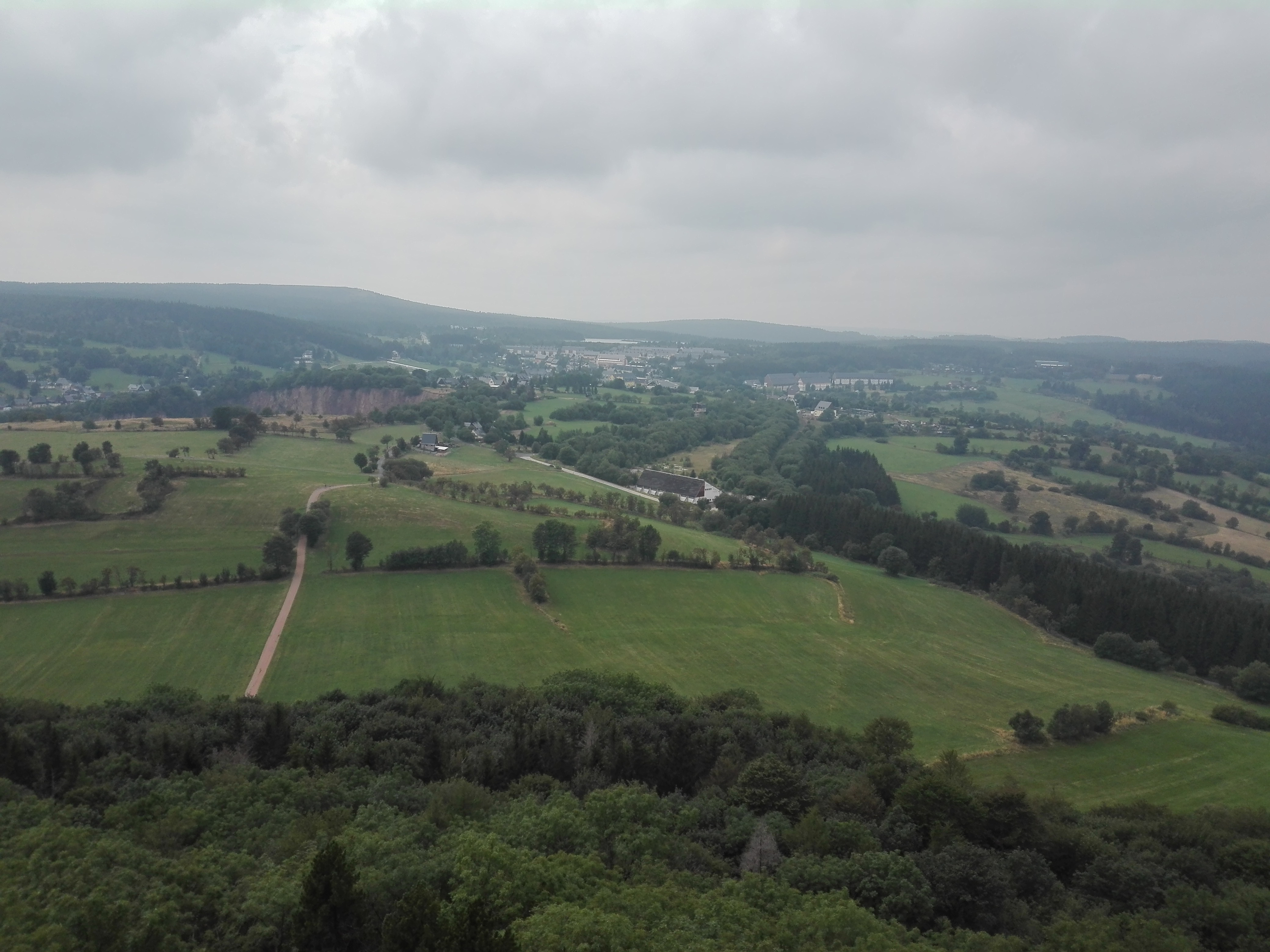
- Interactive map of Eastern Ore Mountains
- Location: Czech Republic
- Coordinates: 50°42′30″N 13°49′39″E
- Area: 40 km^{2} (15 sq mi)
- Elevation: 700 m (2,300 ft)
- Established: 1995 by district offices of Teplice and Ústí nad Labem

Eastern Ore Mountains (Czech: Východní Krušné Hory) is a nature park near Teplice, Czech Republic. The nature park was founded in 1995. It covers an area of 40 km^{2}. The nature park is known for its diverse habitats, including peat bogs and mountain meadows. The nature park Eastern Ore Mountains lies in the UNESCO World Heritage Site Ore Mountains. It is part of the special protection area Východní Krušné Hory, which was founded in 2005, because of the population of black grouse (Lyrurus tetrix) and other endangered bird species within it.

== Location ==
The nature park Východní Krušné hory (Eastern Ore mountains) is located to nord of the Ústí nad Labem Region, in district of the town of Teplice. The protected area embraces around 40 km^{2}. The west–east prolongation is defined by the Czech–German border, particularly from Cínovec to Petrovice (c. 25 km (16 mi) in length). The north–south width varies from the border between one and 3.5 km, the villages of Dubí, Krupka and Chlumec are positioned close to the southern limit of the park. The nature park is part of the Ore Mountains area. Mainly the high mountain area is under protection. The German Landschaftsschutzgebiet Osterzgebirge continuous on the German side of the Ore mountains. In the east, the Labské pískovce Protected Landscape Area and the nature park Bohemian Switzerland adjoin the nature park. The highest point is the Loučná hill (965 m). Most of the nature park is characterised by man-made ecosystems like mountain, wet meadows and stone-ridges. Actually, the meadows are still in usage for hay production and pasture. The western part of the park is characterized by forest.

== History ==
The area of the Ore Mountains was first named Miriquidi, the first settlers were Celts. A stronger wave of settlers appeared in the Eastern Ore Mountains during the 12th century. During that time mining activities started. In Freiberg, silver was found, while in Krupka tin was discovered.

=== Usage of the landscape ===
The Ore Mountains show a rich history, especially in mining. Already during the 12th century the technology was highly developed, consequently tin and silver was possible to mine. The technology of subsurface and surface mining developed and was extensively used in this specific area. The mining activities came to an end during the 17th century. With the mining activity, an intensive usage of wood began and the deforestation of the Ore Mountains began. The wood was used for construction of the mines. To be able to produce food, agriculture was established and it was the second reason for deforestation. The new first fields were full of stones, it was necessary to transport them out of the field. This is when clearance cairns were built. The early settlers by piled stones from fields at the edge with the neighbour's areas. A mosaic of cultural landscape developed during the years. The next, however, not so intensive wave of mining activity appeared in the late 18th century. The last closure of uranium and tin mining was in 1990.

=== History of the nature park ===
The nature park Eastern Ore Mountains was established in 1995 by the district offices of Ústí nad Laben and Teplice for the protection of mountain ridges, meadows, forests and stone ridges and the specific flora and fauna. In 2005 the special protection area Eastern Ore Mountains was established with the aim of protection of its the black grouse population. In the area around Cínovec a Special Area of Conservation "Východní Krušnohoří" was established. Its protected habitats are: European dry heaths, mountain hay meadows, bog woodland and Acidophilous Picea forests of the montane to alpine levels (Vaccinio-Piceetea).

Since 2019, the Ore mountains are part of a UNESCO World Heritage Site. There are 22 important parts of the Ore Mountains forming the world heritage. Five of them are in the Czech Republic. The mountain landscape around Krupka is located in the Eastern Ore mountains.

== Nature ==
=== Geological history ===
The Ore Mountains were formed in two stages.

The first stage was 350 to 250 million years ago, during the Carboniferous era. The process of folding of rocks during the Variscan orogeny (collision of Laurentia and Gondwana), resulted in the Variscan mountain range. It was composed of gneiss, mica slate and phyllite. Because of later volcanic activity, magma pushed to the surface in the region of Ore Mountains and after subsurface cooling of lava, granite and rhyolite originated. During time the ore repositories originated. Through later long-time erosion, the original Variscan mountain range was eroded and flattened.

The second stage of formation of the Ore Mountains has the span from 80 to 15 million years ago. The geological activity behind it, is microplate geotectonics. The African tectonic plate pushed several microplates to the north (to Europe). Thanks to that, prolongation and narrowing phases occurred along the northern edge of the Bohemian Massif. The European crust broke down, one of developing elements were wards. Some wards sunk down into the Eger Graben. These ancient geological activities are important for the actual geomorphology of the Ore Mountains. Later, the earth crust broke again because of transpression-extension regimes followed by volcanic activity, resulting in origination of basalt. The actual morphology of the Ore Mountains is modeled by later erosional processes.

Geology

The eastern Ore Mountains are in the region of the Bohemian massif. The area surrounding Cínovec is characterised by rhyolite, dacite flows and tuffs from Precambrian and Paleozoic volcanics and metavolcanics. Additional there are variscan intrusives in forms of granitoid and tonalite dyke rocks. From Krupka to Petrovice muscovite-chlorite, muscovite-chlorite-biotit, two-mica and biotite metagranites to metagranodiorites and orthogneisses occur. Between Krupka and Chlumes, Precambrian two-mica and biotite gneisses, which are locally migmatized, can be found. Near the top of Špičák olivine alkaline basalts and basanites, olivine foidites, limburgites, melitic olivine-bearing rocks, subvolcanic basaltic breccias and altered olivine basaltic characterise the area.

=== Soil ===
In the Eastern Ore Mountains podzol, stagnogley and bog soil are typical for the highest parts. These soil types are often arranged in a mosaic. Brown earth and rankers occur in lower parts.

=== Flora ===
The flora of the whole Eastern Ore Mountains (both German and Czech parts) includes 2000 species of plants. The vegetation is very rich due to highly changeable factors:

- different altitudes above sea level
- climate differences on small scale east is more continental than west
- heterogeneity in microclimates on slopes
- variability and differences in stone crust and therefore differences in soil types
- long history in land use by humans
- very low potential for intensive agriculture due to natural rough conditions in the Eastern Ore Mountains

In valleys thermophilic species are typical. Beech (Fagus sylvatica), oak (Quercus), lime (Tilia platyphyllos) and common hornbeam (Carpinus betulus) are typical trees for this area. Herbs are dependent on site related factors like moisture and nutrient richness. Lily of the valley (Convallaria majalis) and common cow-wheat (Melampyrum pratense) occur in nutrient poor places. On sun exposed places are white swallowwort (Vincetoxicum hirundinaria) and wild licorice (Astragalus glycyphyllos) typical. On more moisture and nutrient richer sites European wild ginger (Asarum europaeum) and Corydalis cava occur.

==== Forests ====
In the forests of the Eastern Ore Mountains would naturally appear forest types with beech tree (Fagus sylvatica), Norway spruce (Picea abies) or silver fir (Abies alba) dominance. In the higher ranges, spruce trees and silver fir would be typical. Sadly, through monoculture plantation of spruce trees, most of the natural old forests do exist in small fragments or do not exist at all. In lower ranges, beech trees are dominant, spruce trees, sycamore maple (Acer pseudoplatanus) and silver fir can occur less frequently. In these mixed forests in the herb layer is purple lettuce (Prenanthes purpurea), whorled Solomon's-seal (Polygonatum verticillatum) and sweet-scented bedstraw (Galium odoratum). In very special forest types herbs like goat's beard (Aruncus dioicus), white butterbur (Petasites albus) and annual honesty (Lunaria annua) occur.

==== Peat bogs ====
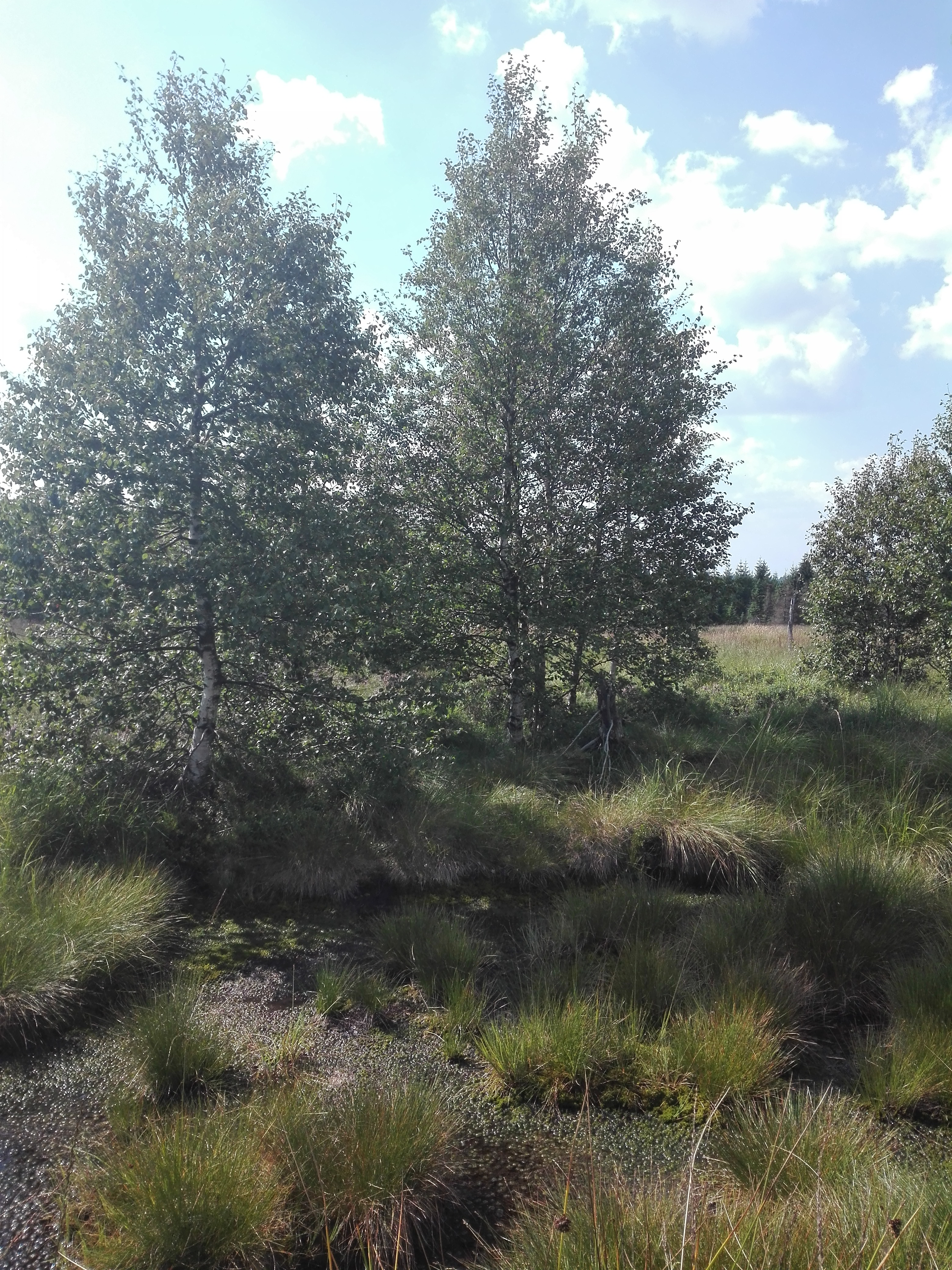

Peat bogs in the Eastern Ore Mountains are mostly raised bogs. The typical plants for peat bogs are: round-leaved sundew (Drosera rotundifolia), hare's-tail cottongrass (Eriophorum vaginatum), Pinus x rotundata and a variety of 30 peat moss species (Sphagnum).

==== Meadows ====
Mountain meadows (for example near Telnice) are characterised by Persicaria, Eriophorum, Meum athamanticum, Lilium bulbiferum, Arnica, Dianthus sylvaticus, and Menyanthes trifoliata. Wet meadows offer a special habitat for the following species: perennial honesty (Lunaria rediviva), common butterwort (Pinguicula vulgaris) and marsh violet (Viola palustris).

==== Clearance cairns ====
Clearance cairns are typical for the Ore Mountains. The occurrence of common hazel (Corylus avellana) is very typical for the stone ridges. Its wood was often used as firewood. These specific, often very sunny, stone rich structures belong to very heterogeneous habitats. Such habitats are becoming more and more important for endangered species of mosses and lichens. They form also important habitats for various birds of agricultural landscapes. Due to their high variety in microhabitats, it is not possible to summarize typical species.

== Nature conservation ==
Nature conservation in the nature park Eastern Ore Mountains has diverse aims. In general, the protection of the characteristic nature of the following environments and all their typical fauna and flora:

- mountain ridges with forest vegetation
- mountain meadows
- wet meadows
- peat bogs

The nature park lies in the special protection area Eastern Ore Mountains of the black grouse (Lyrurus tetrix). This special protection area is, in comparison to the nature park, large and covers an area of 16367.7047 ha. The aim of the special protection area is the conservation and protection of the population of black grouse.

=== Orchid meadows ===
Typical for the Eastern Ore Mountains are various types of orchid meadows. To preserve them extensive agriculture is necessary. Mowing the meadows with a scythe and using the meadows as pastures for sheep, horses, cows or goats are ideal measures for preservation of the orchids. Management by mowing is financially supported by special programs for landscape management of the Czech ministry of the environment.

=== Peat bogs ===
The natural water system of peat-bogs is often disturbed by melioration measures from the past. To effectively conserve peat-bogs, revitalisation of peat bogs is often necessary. To achieve a natural and optimal water regime, the melioration measures need to be reversed. With the help of measures as preventing outflow of water into rivers and the landscape, higher water levels, which are important for the peat bog ecosystem, can be achieved.

== Czech-German relationship in nature conservation ==
=== TetraoVit ===
TetraoVit is a Czech – German common project funded by the European Union; it is focused on revitalization of peat bogs and protection of the habitat of the black grouse (Tetrao tetrix). The aim of the project is to establish an efficient protection of the black grouse. Therefore, its ideal habitats are analysed with the help of GIS and field research. Consequently, important parameters for the black grouse can be identified and specific measures to protect the specific habitats can be taken. The black grouse needs peat bogs – so their protection and revitalisation are essential and part of this project. Further measures for the black grouse are: creation of open landscape patches, conservation of natural plant species composition for food sources for the birds, restoration of landscape without forest vegetation, measures for pasture during flowing and breeding time, creation of a mosaic of succession stages in compact forests, elimination of the populations of wild boar (Sus scrofa), racoon (Procyon lotor) and racoon dog (Nyctereutes procyonoides), limitation of the populations of red fox (Vulpes vulpes), European badger (Meles meles) and minimizing actions disturbing the black grouse in its natural behaviour.

=== FloraLith ===
FloraLith is a Czech - German project funded by the European Union; it is focused on protection and conservation of ecosystems linked to human activities of mining and agriculture and characterised by rock, stones and virgin soil. Stone ridges and mine dumps are the landscape structures of interest in this project. Botanical monitoring of the landscape structures and the creation of a management plan are major aims of the project. The organisation of excursions and other activities for environmental education are essential parts of the project.

Activities supported by local environmental organisations Grüne Liga Osterzgebirge and Hnutí Brontosaurus are mainly mowing meadows, projects linked to forestry and nature conservation. The biggest event is the Heuhoj Workcamp during July. Participants mow meadows in both countries to preserve biodiversity. Grüne Liga Osterzgebirge organises one week of international nature conservation training, which takes place during August. Similarly to the Heuhoj Workcamp meadows are mown and measures to preserve the population of the black grouse are done.
