= Oxfordshire =

County of England

- Non-metropolitan and ceremonial county
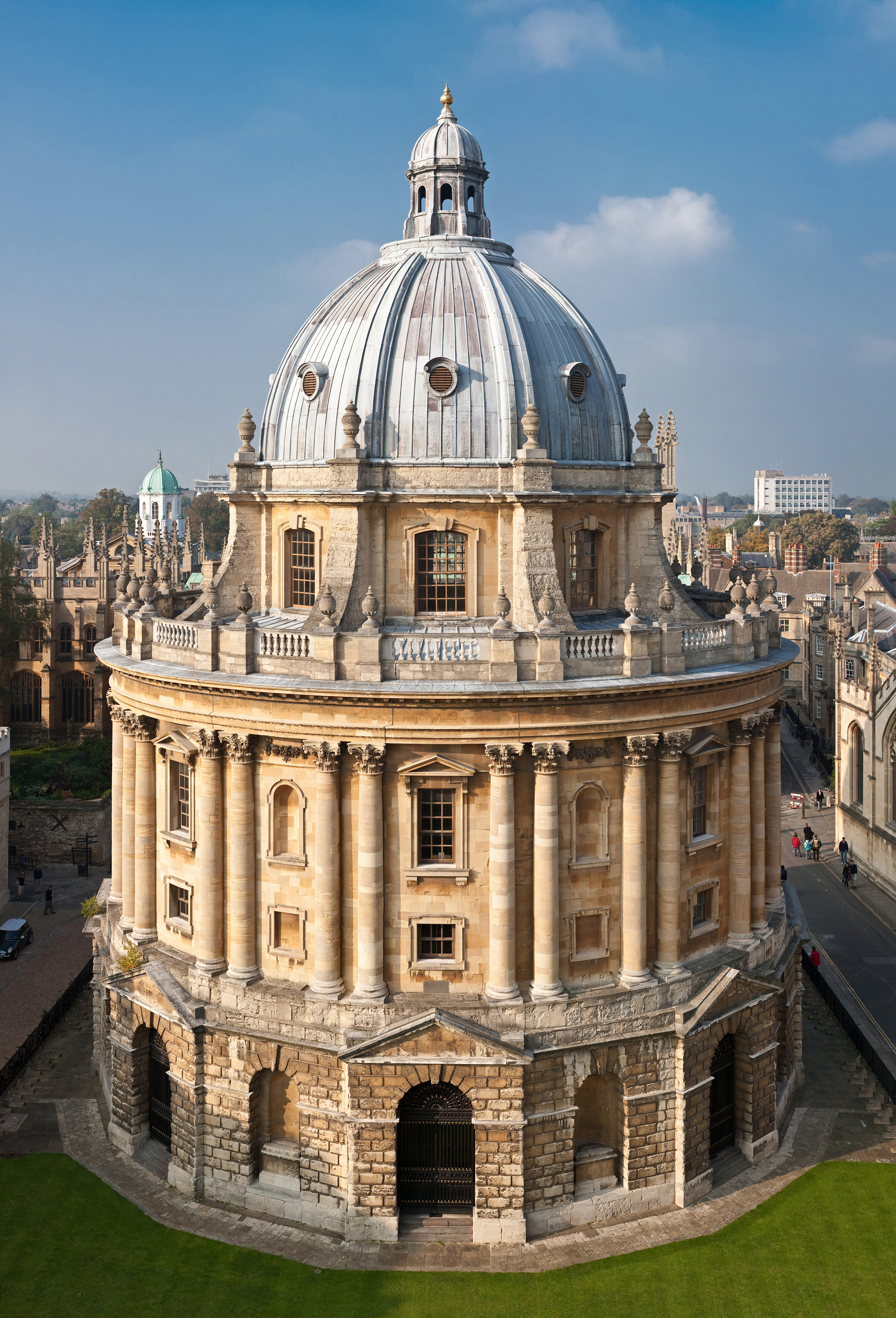
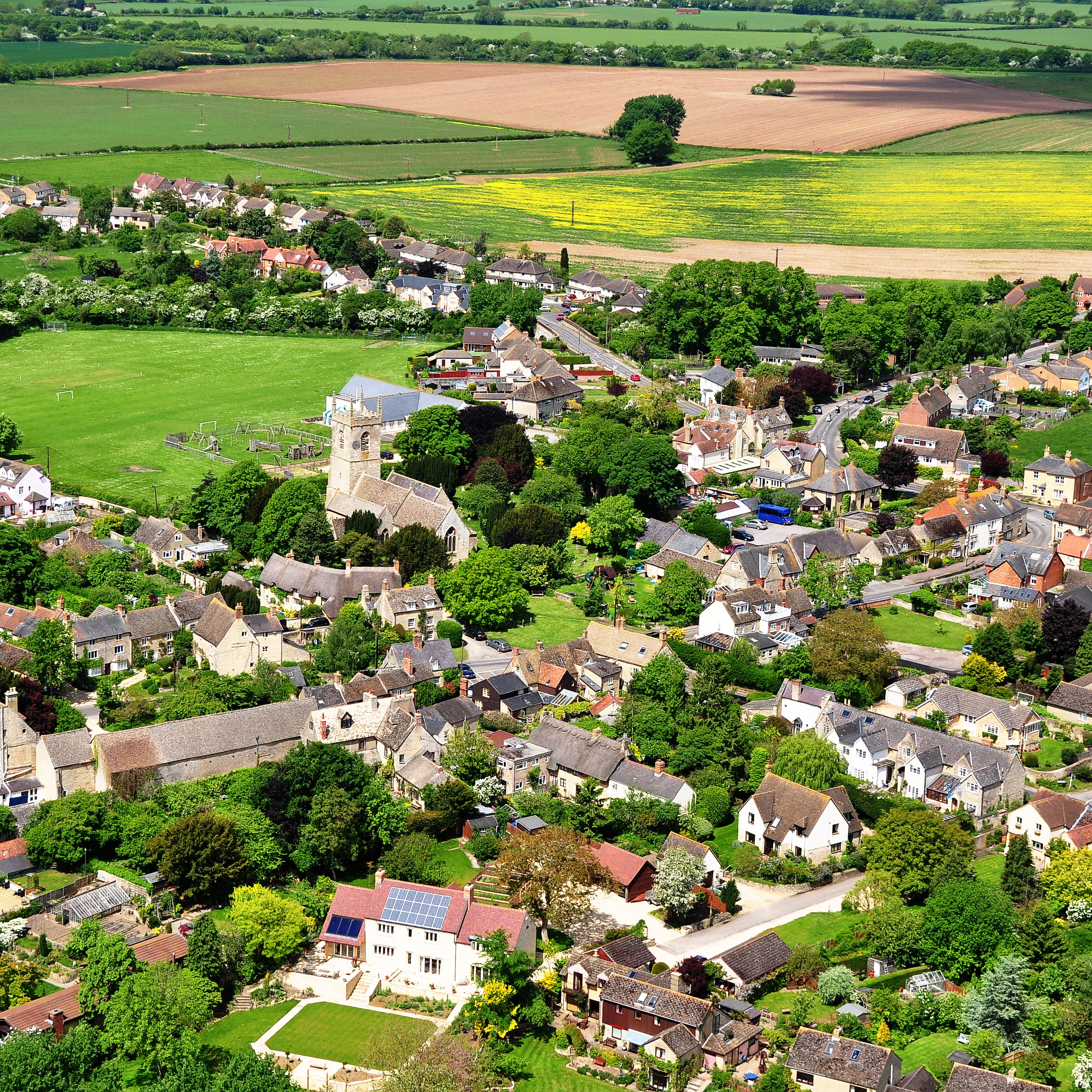
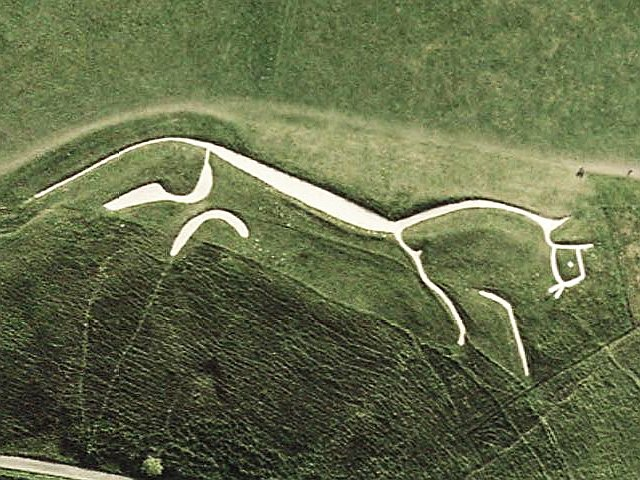
- Clockwise from top left: the Radcliffe Camera, part of the University of Oxford; Islip, in the Cherwell district; and the Uffington White Horse

- Ceremonial Oxfordshire within England Historic Oxfordshire in the British Isles
- Coordinates: 51.75°N 1.28°W
- Sovereign state: United Kingdom
- Constituent country: England
- Region: South East England
- Time zone: UTC+0 (GMT)
  - Summer (DST): UTC+1 (BST)
- UK Parliament: 7 Members of Parliament: Lab: 2; Lib Dem: 5
- Police: Thames Valley Police
- Largest city: Oxford
- Ceremonial county
- Lord Lieutenant: Marjorie Glasgow
- High Sheriff: Muhammad Jawaid Malik
- Area: 2,605 km^{2} (1,006 sq mi)
  - Rank: 22nd of 48
- Population (2024): 763,218
  - Rank: 35th of 48
  - Density: 293/km^{2} (760/sq mi)
- Non-metropolitan county
- County council: Oxfordshire County Council
- Control: Liberal Democrat
- Admin HQ: Oxford
- Area: 2,605 km^{2} (1,006 sq mi)
  - Rank: 12th of 21
- Population (2025): 769,831
  - Rank: 15th of 21
  - Density: 296/km^{2} (770/sq mi)
- ISO 3166-2: GB-OXF
- GSS code: E10000025
- ITL: TLJ14
- Website: oxfordshire.gov.uk
- Districts
- Districts of Oxfordshire
- Districts: List: Oxford; Cherwell; South Oxfordshire; Vale of White Horse; West Oxfordshire

Oxfordshire (/ˈɒksfərdʃər, -ʃɪər/ OKS-fərd-shər, -sheer; abbreviated Oxon) is a ceremonial county in South East England. The county is bordered by Northamptonshire and Warwickshire to the north, Buckinghamshire to the east, Berkshire to the south, and Wiltshire and Gloucestershire to the west. The city of Oxford is the largest settlement.

The county is largely rural, with an area of 1,006 sq mi (2,605 km^{2}) and an estimated population of 763,218 in 2024. Oxford, which is famous for its university, is near the centre of the county. Other settlements include Banbury in the north, Bicester in the north-east, Abingdon-on-Thames and Didcot in the south, and Witney in the west. For local government purposes Oxfordshire is a non-metropolitan county with five districts. The part of the county south of the River Thames, largely corresponding to the Vale of White Horse district, was historically part of Berkshire.

The lowlands in the centre of the county are crossed by the River Thames and its tributaries, the valleys of which are separated by low hills. The south contains parts of the Berkshire Downs and Chiltern Hills, and the north-west includes part of the Cotswolds; all three regions are Areas of Outstanding Natural Beauty. The county's highest point is White Horse Hill (261 metres/856 ft), part of the Berkshire Downs.

== History ==
Oxfordshire was recorded as a county in the early years of the 10th century and lies between the River Thames to the south, the Cotswolds to the west, the Chilterns to the east and the Midlands to the north, with spurs running south to Henley-on-Thames and north to Banbury.

Although it had some significance as an area of valuable agricultural land in the centre of the country, it was largely ignored by the Romans and did not grow in importance until the formation of a settlement at Oxford in the 8th century. Alfred the Great was born across the Thames in Wantage, in the Vale of White Horse. The University of Oxford was founded in 1096, although its collegiate structure did not develop until later on. The university in the county town of Oxford (whose name came from Anglo-Saxon Oxenaford = "ford for oxen") grew in importance during the Middle Ages and early modern period. The area was part of the Cotswolds wool trade from the 13th century, generating much wealth, particularly in the western portions of the county in the Oxfordshire Cotswolds. Morris Motors was founded in Oxford in 1912, bringing heavy industry to an otherwise agricultural county. The role of agriculture as an employer declined rapidly in the 20th century; as of 2023, 1.2 per cent of the county's population are involved in agriculture, forestry, or fishing due to high mechanisation. Nevertheless, Oxfordshire remains a very agricultural county by land use, with a lower population than neighbouring Berkshire and Buckinghamshire, which are both smaller.

During most of its history, the county was partitioned as fourteen divisions called hundreds, namely Bampton, Banbury, Binfield, Bloxham, Bullingdon, Chadlington, Dorchester, Ewelme, Langtree, Lewknor, Pyrton, Ploughley, Thame and Wootton.

The Oxfordshire and Buckinghamshire Light Infantry, the main army unit in the area, was based at Cowley Barracks on Bullingdon Green, Cowley.

The flag which represents the historic county

The Vale of White Horse district and parts of the South Oxfordshire administrative district south of the River Thames were historically part of Berkshire, but, in 1974, Abingdon, Didcot, Faringdon, Wallingford and Wantage were added to the administrative county of Oxfordshire under the Local Government Act 1972. Conversely, the Caversham area of Reading, now administratively in Berkshire, was historically part of Oxfordshire, as was the parish of Stokenchurch, now administratively in Buckinghamshire. The areas of Oxford city south of the Thames, such as Grandpont, were transferred much earlier in 1889.

== Geography ==
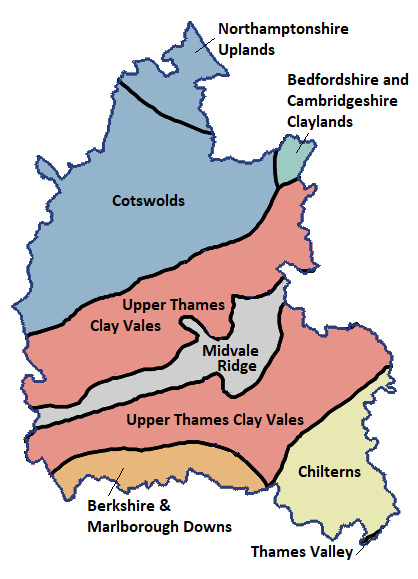
National Character Areas of Oxfordshire

Oxfordshire is a county in south-central England. Its landscape is characterised by two bands of hill ranges in the north and south of the county separated by a low-lying clay vale around the River Thames, influenced by its geology.

The northernmost point of the county is near Claydon Hay Farm, Claydon at 52°10′6.58″N 1°19′54.92″W. This is where the Cherwell District of Oxfordshire meets the counties of Warwickshire and Northamptonshire. This northernmost area of Cherwell is within the Northamptonshire Uplands (National Character Area 80), a range of ironstone-capped limestone hills and valleys. The area within the Northamptonshire Uplands includes the market town of Banbury.

South of the Uplands are the eastern extent of the Cotswolds (NCA 107), a hill range forming part of a wider oolitic limestone range across England known for its local stone. A large part of the wider Cotswolds within the county are in the protected Cotswolds National Landscape. Oxfordshire's westernmost point is in the Cotswolds NCA at 51°46′59.73″N 1°43′9.68″W, near Downs Farm, Westwell.

South of the Cotswolds, Oxfordshire opens up into the undulating farmland of the upper Thames clay vales (NCA 108). The clay vales encircle the Midvale Ridge (NCA 109), a band of low-lying limestone hills running through the centre of the county. These two landscapes are the population centres of the county, containing Oxford itself as well as other key towns such as Witney, Bicester and Abingdon.

To the south west of the county, the clay vales give way to the chalk hills of the Berkshire and Marlborough Downs (NCA 116) south of Wantage, known particularly for the Uffington White Horse. The Downs form part of the North Wessex Downs National Landscape.

The Berkshire Downs extend to the Thames at Goring, east of which are further chalk hills in the Chilterns (NCA 110), much of which is in the Chilterns National Landscape. South of the boundaries of the National Landscape are Oxfordshire's southernmost and easternmost points near the near Thames and Kennet Marina at Playhatch (51°27′34.74″N 0°56′48.3″W) and Shiplake (51°30′14.22″N 0°52′13.99″W) respectively.

Long-distance walks within the county include the Ridgeway National Trail, Macmillan Way, Oxfordshire Way, and the D'Arcy Dalton Way.

=== Rivers and canals ===
From the mid-point western edge to the southeast corner of Oxfordshire, via the city in the middle, runs the Thames with its flat floodplains. This river forms the historic limit with Berkshire, remaining so on some lowest reaches. The Thames Path National Trail follows the river from the upper estuary to the source.

Many smaller rivers in the county feed into the Thames, such as the Thame, Windrush, Evenlode and Cherwell. Some of these have trails running along their valleys. The Oxford Canal links to the Midlands and follows the Cherwell from Banbury via Kidlington into the city of Oxford, where these join the navigable Thames. About 15% of the historically named Wilts & Berks Canal, in sporadic sections, has been restored to navigability.

=== Green belt ===
Oxfordshire contains a green belt area that fully envelops the city of Oxford and extends for some miles to protect surrounding towns and villages from inappropriate development and urban growth. Its border in the east extends to the Buckinghamshire county boundary, while part of its southern border is shared with the North Wessex Downs AONB. It was first drawn up in the 1950s, and all of the county's districts contain some portion of the belt.

=== Principal summits ===
The following hills within the county have at least 30 metres of topographic prominence:

| Hill | Elevation | Drop | Grid ref | National Character Area |
|---|---|---|---|---|
| Whitehorse Hill | 261 m (856 ft) | 79 m | SU301863 | Berkshire & Marlborough Downs |
| Bald Hill | 257.2 m (844 ft) | 125 m | SU728957 | Chilterns |
| Sparsholt Down | 244 m (801 ft) | 42 m | SU336851 | Berkshire & Marlborough Downs |
| Lattin Down | 239.7 m (786 ft) | 30.1 m | SU414836 | Berkshire & Marlborough Downs |
| Over Norton Hill | 231 m (758 ft) | 51 m | SP326284 | Cotswolds |
| Shenlow Hill | 227.5 m (746 ft) | 56.6 m | SP355427 | Cotswolds |
| Epwell Hill | 226.4 m (743 ft) | 36.9 m | SP353416 | Cotswolds |
| Long Hill | 206 m (676 ft) | 35 m | SP366405 | Cotswolds |
| Barton Hill | 197 m (646 ft) | 41 m | SP380398 | Cotswolds |
| Shotover Hill | 171 m (561 ft) | 107 m | SP563062 | Midvale Ridge |
| Crouch Hill | 170 m (558 ft) | 36 m | SP440392 | Northamptonshire Uplands |
| Wytham Hill | 164.3 m (539 ft) | 94.9 m | SP458082 | Midvale Ridge |
| Pickett's Heath | 164 m (538 ft) | 86 m | SP482029 | Midvale Ridge |
| Badbury Hill | 162.4 m (533 ft) | 72.1 m | SU261947 | Midvale Ridge |
| Hurst Hill | 159 m (522 ft) | 32 m | SP476041 | Midvale Ridge |
| Steepness Hill | 154 m (505 ft) | 39 m | SP437317 | Cotswolds |
| Faringdon Hill | 153 m (502 ft) | 46 m | SU297956 | Midvale Ridge |
| Adwell Cop | 148.6 m (488 ft) | 33.4 m | SU703990 | Upper Thames Clay Vales |
| Beckley Hill | 141 m (463 ft) | 46 m | SP562105 | Midvale Ridge |
| Red Hill | 134 m (440 ft) | 31 m | SP585073 | Midvale Ridge |
| Wittenham Clumps | 123.4 m (405 ft) | 69 m | SU566927 | Upper Thames Clay Vales |
| Graven Hill | 115 m (377 ft) | 48 m | SP588204 | Upper Thames Clay Vales |
| Blewburton Hill | 110 m (361 ft) | 32 m | SU547861 | Berkshire & Marlborough Downs |
| Arncott Hill | 108 m (354 ft) | 34 m | SP616171 | Upper Thames Clay Vales |
| Windmill Hill | 102.4 m (336 ft) | 37.8 m | SU552984 | Midvale Ridge |
| Woodeaton Hill | 102 m (335 ft) | 38 m | SP534125 | Upper Thames Clay Vales |

== Economy ==
Regional gross value added, at current basic prices in £ millions
| Year | Total (Note: Components may not sum to totals due to rounding) | Agriculture (Note: includes hunting and forestry) | Industry (Note: includes energy and construction) | Services (Note: includes financial intermediation services indirectly measured) |
|---|---|---|---|---|
| 1995 | 7,607 | 120 | 2,084 | 5,404 |
| 2000 | 10,594 | 80 | 2,661 | 7,853 |
| 2003 | 12,942 | 93 | 2,665 | 10,184 |

== Politics ==
The coat of arms of Oxfordshire County Council

The Oxfordshire County Council, since 2013 under no overall control, is responsible for the most strategic local government functions, including schools, county roads and social services. The county is divided into five local government districts: Oxford, Cherwell, Vale of White Horse (after the Uffington White Horse), West Oxfordshire and South Oxfordshire, which deal with such matters as town and country planning, waste collection and housing.

In the 2016 European Union referendum, Oxfordshire was the only English county as a whole to vote to remain in the European Union by a significant margin, at 57.06% (70.27% in the City of Oxford), despite Cherwell (barely) voting to leave at 50.31%.

=== Future ===
In July 2026, the UK Government announced that it intends to reorganise local government in Oxfordshire by April 2028. Three unitary authority areas will cover the county, one of which will straddle the boundary with Berkshire.

Greater Oxford will be larger than the current Oxford district and cover the city and its hinterland. Northern Oxfordshire will combine most of the current Cherwell and West Oxfordshire districts. Ridgeway will combine most of the current South Oxfordshire and Vale of White Horse districts and the West Berkshire district.

== Education ==
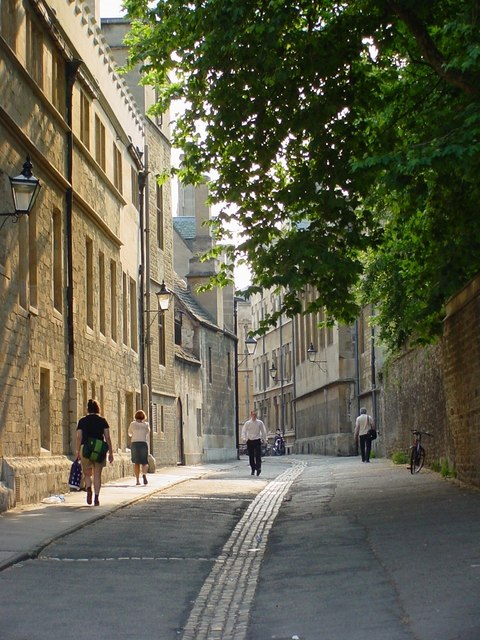
Brasenose Lane in Oxford city centre, a street onto which three colleges back

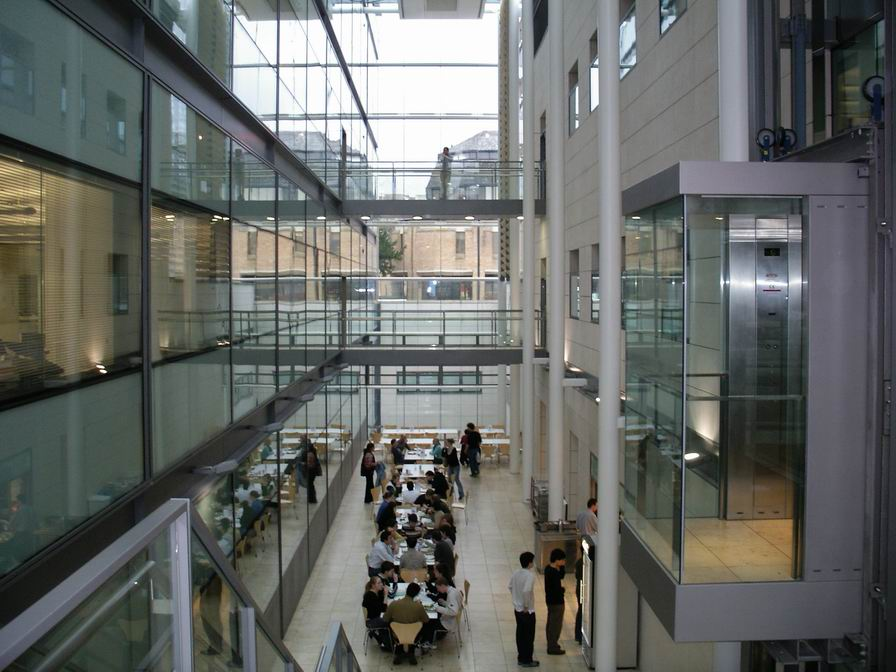
The University of Oxford's Chemistry Research Laboratory

Oxfordshire has a comprehensive education system with 23 independent schools and 35 state secondary schools. Only eight schools do not have a sixth form; these are mostly in South Oxfordshire and Cherwell districts. Oxfordshire has a large number of leading independent schools, including public schools such as Radley College.

The county has two universities: the ancient University of Oxford and the modern Oxford Brookes University, which are both located in Oxford. In addition, Wroxton College, located in Banbury, is affiliated with Fairleigh Dickinson University of New Jersey.

=== Public libraries ===
There are currently 44 public libraries in Oxfordshire, all operated under Oxfordshire County Council. For members of the library service, the libraries offer a borrowing service for members to borrow books, audiobooks, e-books, and more. In addition to lending library materials, the libraries also offer many different programmes for children and adults.

== Buildings ==
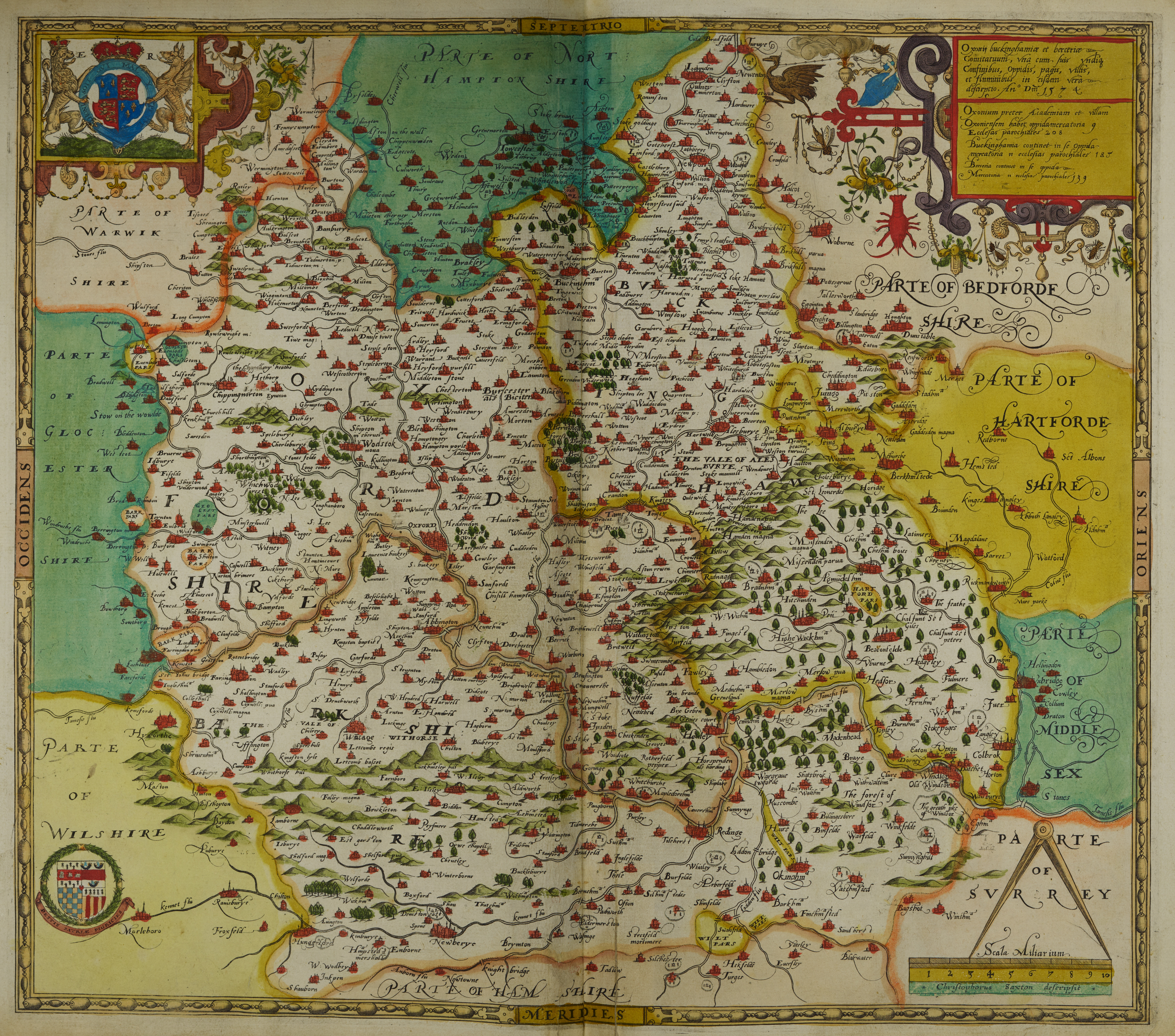
Hand-drawn map of Oxford, Buckinghamshire and Berkshire by Christopher Saxton from 1576

The "dreaming spires" of the University of Oxford are among the reasons for which Oxford is the sixth most visited city in the United Kingdom by international visitors. Among many notable University buildings are the Sheldonian Theatre, built 1664–1668 to the design of Sir Christopher Wren, and the Radcliffe Camera, built 1737–1749 to the design of James Gibbs.

Blenheim Palace, close to Woodstock, was designed and partly built by the architect John Vanbrugh for John Churchill, 1st Duke of Marlborough, after he had won the battle of Blenheim. The gardens, which can be visited, were designed by the landscape gardener "Capability" Brown, who planted the trees in the battle formation of the victorious army. Sir Winston Churchill was born in the palace in 1874. It is open to the public.

Chastleton House, on the Gloucestershire and Warwickshire borders, is a great country mansion built on property bought from Robert Catesby, who was one of the men involved in the Gunpowder Plot with Guy Fawkes. Stonor Park, another country mansion, has belonged to the recusant Stonor family for centuries.

Mapledurham House is an Elizabethan stately home in the south-east of the county, close to Reading.

The Abbey in Sutton Courtenay is a medieval courtyard house. It has been recognised by the Historic Building Council for England (now Historic England) as a building of outstanding historic and architectural interest. It is considered to be a 'textbook' example of the English medieval manor house and is a Grade I-listed building.

== Settlements ==
Oxfordshire population pyramid in 2021

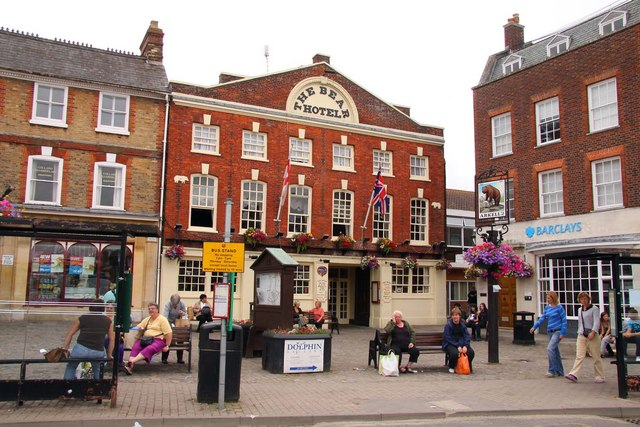
Wantage Market Place

| # | Town | Population (2021) | Definition | Notes |
|---|---|---|---|---|
| 1 | Oxford | 162,100 | Oxford non-metropolitan district | |
| 2 | Banbury | 54,335 | Civil parish | |
| 3 | Abingdon-on-Thames | 37,931 | Civil parish | Historic Berkshire |
| 4 | Bicester | 37,020 | Civil parish | |
| 5 | Didcot | 32,183 | Civil parish (Note: 200 dwellings, south-east of the town, lie in East Hagbourne parish) | Historic Berkshire |
| 6 | Witney | 31,217 | Civil parish | |
| 7 | Carterton | 15,680 | Civil parish | |
| 8 | Kidlington | 13,600 | Civil parish | Does not include Gosford |
| 9 | Thame | 13,273 | Civil parish | Includes Moreton. |
| 10 | Wantage | 13,106 | Civil parish | Historic Berkshire |
| 11 | Henley-on-Thames | 12,186 | Civil parish | |
| 12 | Faringdon | 8,627 | Great Faringdon civil parish | Historic Berkshire |
| 13 | Wallingford | 8,455 | Civil parish | Historic Berkshire |
| 14 | Grove | 8,336 | Civil parish | |
| 15 | Chinnor | 7,651 | Civil parish | |
| 16 | Chipping Norton | 7,250 | Civil parish | |
| 17 | Eynsham | 5,324 | Civil parish | |
| 18 | Benson | 4,801 | Civil parish | |
| 19 | Wheatley | 4,267 | Civil parish | |
| 20 | Sonning Common | 4,138 | Civil Parish | |
| 21 | Kennington | 4,133 | Civil parish | |
| 22 | Woodstock | 3,521 | Civil parish | |
| 23 | Charlbury | 3,063 | Civil parish | |
| 24 | Bampton | 2,993 | Civil parish | |
| 25 | Watlington | 2,697 | Civil parish | |
| 26 | Deddington | 2,301 | Civil parish | |

== Places of interest ==
Key
| | Abbey/Priory/Cathedral |
| Accessible open space | Accessible open space |
| | Amusement/Theme Park |
| | Castle |
| Country Park | Country Park |
| | English Heritage |
| | Forestry Commission |
| Heritage railway | Heritage railway |
| Historic house | Historic House |
| Places of Worship | Places of Worship |
| Museum (free) Museum | Museum (free/not free) |
| National Trust | National Trust |
| | Theatre |
| | Zoo |

- Abingdon County Hall Museum – housed in a 17th-century county hall building
- Ashdown House – 17th-century country house in the Lambourn Downs
- Ashmolean Museum – Oxford University's museum of art and archaeology
- Banbury Museum, Banbury
- Bicester Village
- Blenheim Palace and garden – UNESCO World Heritage Site
- Broughton Castle – 14th-century fortified manor house
- Buscot Park, Buscot – 18th-century country house and landscape garden
- Champs Chapel Museum of East Hendred – village museum in a 15th-century Carthusian chapel
- Charlbury Museum
- Chastleton House – 17th-century country house (limited access)
- Chiltern Hills – Area of Outstanding Natural Beauty
- Chinnor & Princes Risborough Railway – operated with steam and diesel locomotives
- Chipping Norton Museum
- Cholsey and Wallingford Railway
- Cogges Manor Farm Museum, Witney – a living museum of country life
- Combe Mill Museum, Long Hanborough – working museum of stationary steam engines
- Cotswold Wildlife Park and garden, Bradwell Grove, Holwell
- Cotswolds – Area of Outstanding Natural Beauty
- Didcot Railway Centre – museum of the Great Western Railway
- Dorchester Abbey, Dorchester-on-Thames – 12th-century church of former Augustinian abbey
- Great Coxwell Barn – 14th-century tithe barn
- Greys Court, Rotherfield Greys – 16th-century country house
- Hampton Gay Manor – ruins of 16th-century manor house (no website)
- Harcourt Arboretum, Nuneham Courtenay
- Heythrop Hall – 17th-century country house: now a hotel, golf & country club
- Hook Norton Brewery – working Victorian "tower" brewery that offers guided tours
- Kelmscott Manor – Home of William Morris
- Mapledurham Estate – 16th-century country house and 15th-century watermill
- Milton Manor House – 18th-century country house
- Minster Lovell Hall – dovecote and ruins of 15th-century manor house
- Museum of Bygones, Claydon – private museum including stationary steam engines
- North Wessex Downs – Area of Outstanding Natural Beauty
- Oxford
- Oxford Bus Museum and Morris Motors Museum, Long Hanborough
- Oxford Canal – 18th-century "narrow" canal
- The Oxfordshire Museum, Woodstock
- The Ridgeway
- River and Rowing Museum, Henley-on-Thames
- River Thames
- Rollright Stones – megalithic stone circle and Whispering Knights burial chamber, near Little Rollright
- Rousham House – 17th-century country house and landscape garden
- Rycote chapel – 15th-century chapel with original furnishings
- St Katharine's church, Chiselhampton – 18th-century parish church with original furnishings (no website, limited access)
- St Mary's church, Iffley – 12th-century Norman parish church
- Shotover Country Park, Headington
- Spiceball Country Park, Banbury
- Stanton Harcourt manor house (limited access), with garden and 15th-century chapel and Pope's Tower (no website)
- Stonor Park – country house and 14th-century chapel of the recusant Stonor family
- Swalcliffe Tithe Barn – 15th-century
- Thame Museum
- Tolsey Museum, Burford (no website)
- Uffington White Horse, Uffington Castle and Wayland's Smithy burial chamber in the White Horse Hills
- Vale and Downland Museum, Wantage
- Wallingford Museum
- Wheatley Windmill – 18th-century tower mill

== See also ==
- Geology of Oxfordshire
- Lord Lieutenant of Oxfordshire
- High Sheriff of Oxfordshire
- List of English and Welsh endowed schools (19th century)#Oxfordshire
- Oxfordshire Artweeks, an annual art festival each May
- Oxford University (including individual colleges)
- Oxford Canal
