= Upper Thames Clay Vales =

The Upper Thames Clay Vales is a National Character Area (NCA) as designated by Natural England. It completely surrounds the NCA known as the Midvale Ridge. It is a belt of low-lying farmland on predominantly Jurassic and Cretaceous clays. Its landscapes include enclosed pastures, wet valleys, mixed farmland, hedges, and open arable lands with mature field oaks in places. Its principal settlements are Kidlington, Bicester, Aylesbury, Thame, Wallingford, Didcot, Abingdon, Wantage, Royal Wootton Bassett, Cricklade and Witney, along with parts of Swindon and Oxford. Small parts of the boundary areas of the Cotswolds, Chilterns and North Wessex Downs lie within it. It includes the flatlands of Otmoor and is watered by the rivers Thames, Ock, Thame and Ray. It is mostly within Oxfordshire but includes parts of Buckinghamshire, Wiltshire and Gloucestershire.

== Principal summits ==
Although a low-lying region, the NCA does have a few hills. Hills within the NCA with more than 30 metres of prominence are listed below:

| Hill | Elevation | Prominence | Grid reference |
|---|---|---|---|
| Hook Hill | 155 m (509 ft) | 53 m | SU075849 |
| Adwell Cop | 148.6 m (488 ft) | 33.4 m | SU703990 |
| Worthy Hill | 134 m (440 ft) | 30 m | SU019881 |
| Wittenham Clumps | 123.4 m (405 ft) | 69 m | SU566927 |
| Burn Hill | 117 m (384 ft) | 32 m | SP778124 |
| Graven Hill | 115 m (377 ft) | 48 m | SP588204 |
| Arncott Hill | 108 m (354 ft) | 34 m | SP616171 |
| Woodeaton Hill | 102 m (335 ft) | 38 m | SP534125 |
