= Cheviot Fringe =

Lowlands in Northumbria, England

Coordinates: 55.55°N 2.02°W

- Ceremonial county: Northumberland
- Country: England
- Sovereign state: United Kingdom

Cheviot Fringe (/ˈtʃiːviət/ CHEE-vee-ət) is a geographical region and a Natural England designated National Character Area (or NCA) located in the county Northumberland in northern England. The region consists of the undulating lowlands between the Cheviot Hills and the Northumberland Sandstone Hills NCA. Three major rivers flow through the region, it is bounded on the north by the River Tweed and on the south by the River Coquet and the River Till flows through the middle.

== Description ==
The Cheviot Fringe make up the foothills of the Cheviot Hills, and so, the region is more populous as, unlike The Cheviots, the region does not sit in the Northumberland National Park. The A697 is the only major road going through the region, with Wooler being its largest town. Like Northumbria in general, Cheviot Fringe is relatively dispersed in settlement and has a strong tradition of farming and shepherding. The northern part of the region is more arable versus the south, where sheep raising is more common on its grasslands. The northern part of the NCA straddles the Anglo-Scottish border and is therefore populated by many forts and castles from the Medieval Era.
