= Northern Thames Basin =

The Northern Thames Basin is a National Character Area (NCA) as designated by Natural England. It is a diverse area, extending from Hertfordshire in the west to the Essex coast in the east. It is separated from the North Sea and Thames Estuary by a separate NCA, the Greater Thames Estuary. The Northern Thames Basin contains the suburbs of North London, historic towns and cities such as St Albans and Colchester, and new towns such as Welwyn Garden City, Hatfield and Basildon.

The topography is varied, with a wide plateau divided by river valleys. The prominent hills and ridges of the Bagshot Hills are notable to the northwest, and flat land is found in the south. A layer of thick clay, the London Clay, produces heavy, acidic soils. Therefore, much ancient woodland has been retained. Hertfordshire is heavily wooded in some areas as are parts of Essex. Glacial sands and gravels have resulted in nutrient-poor which support small areas of remnant lowland heathlands. There are alluvial deposits which produce well drained and fertile soils. The underlying chalk beds are a main source of recharge for the principal London Basin Chalk aquifer. There are broad valleys containing the major rivers Ver, Colne and Lea, and slightly steeper valleys containing other rivers.

== Principal summits ==
Although a low-lying area, the clay gives rise to a number of separate low hills. The following hills within the NCA have at least 30 metres of topographic prominence:

Hill	Elevation	Prominence	Grid reference
Bushey Heath	153.4 m (503 ft)	80 m	TQ151939
Deacons Hill	147.6 m (485 ft)	30.6 m	TQ183949
Highwood Hill	143.9 m (472 ft)	31.2 m	TQ218941
Sandy Lane	135 m (443 ft)	62 m	TQ105919
Shenley Hill	134 m (440 ft)	32 m	TL190006
Burnham Green	126.4 m (415 ft)	32 m	TL264165
Harrow on the Hill	124 m (407 ft)	71 m	TQ153874
Brentwood Park	120.9 m (397 ft)	57 m	TQ590913
Langdon Hill	118 m (387 ft)	81 m	TQ679865
Epping Forest	117.2 m (385 ft)	38 m	TL435003
Danbury Ring	111 m (364 ft)	63 m	TL779051
Havering atte Bower	107 m (351 ft)	38 m	TQ516930
Lambourne Hill	102 m (335 ft)	39 m	TQ478951
Bell Hill	98.9 m (324 ft)	33.8 m	TQ674939
Wakemans Hill	92 m (302 ft)	40 m	TQ207889
Criers Wood	89 m (292 ft)	50 m	TL857132
Barn Hill	86 m (282 ft)	32 m	TQ193873
Horsenden Hill	84.9 m (279 ft)	32 m	TQ161843
Thundersley Hill	84.5 m (277 ft)	66 m	TQ790880
Wembley Hill	72 m (236 ft)	33 m	TQ186855
Hanger Hill	65 m (213 ft)	33 m	TQ187820
Stamfords Hill	52.8 m (173 ft)	33 m	TQ892986
Sandy Lane Pit	47.2 m (155 ft)	30.1 m	TQ557809
