= South Herefordshire and Over Severn =

Coordinates: 51.96°N 2.60°W

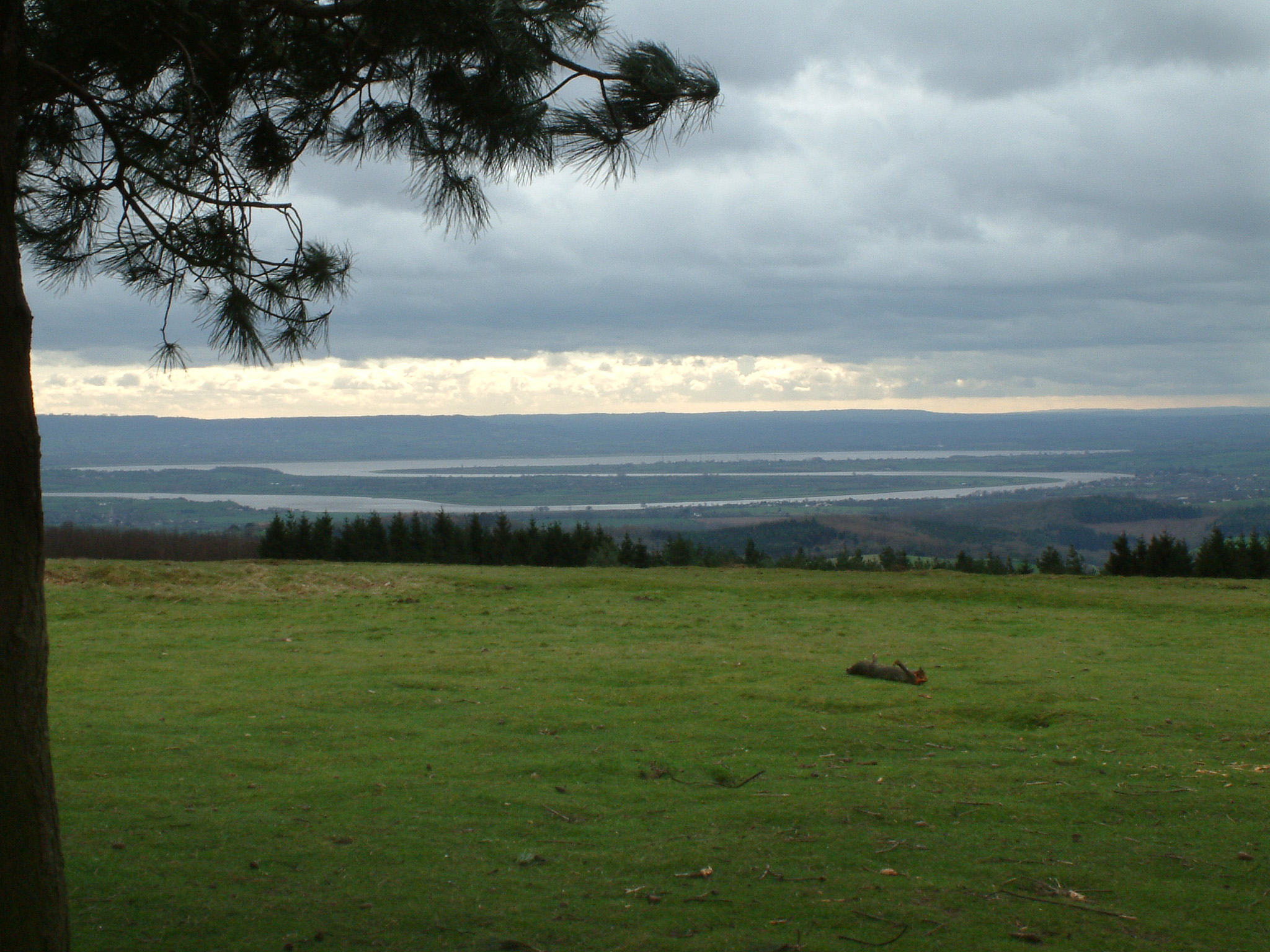
The Severn from May Hill

South Herefordshire and Over Severn is a National Character Area that extends from the south, where it is bounded by the Forest of Dean, northwards to Ewyas Harold in southern Herefordshire and to the southern tip of the Malvern Hills.

There are "stunning panoramic views" from Garway Hill (366m) in Herefordshire and May Hill (296m) in Gloucestershire across the region. The River Wye, a Special Area of Conservation, meanders through the area heading south towards the River Severn and the Wye Valley is an Area of Outstanding Natural Beauty.

Much of the region is "a picturesque, rural, well-wooded landscape" and there are large areas of old, semi-natural forest, parks and traditional orchards as well as ancient hedgerows and grassland. The land is predominantly used for farming - both arable farming and livestock.

== See also ==
- List of National Character Areas
