= North Northumberland Coastal Plain =

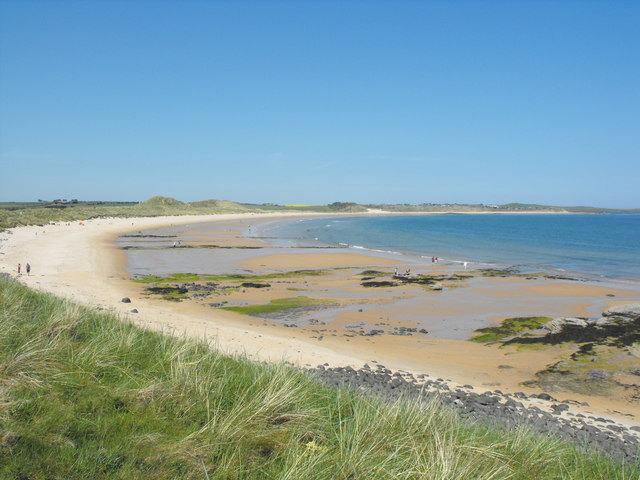
Embleton Bay on the 'soft' part of the coast

The North Northumberland Coastal Plain is a major natural region that lies on England's northeasternmost stretch of coastline on the North Sea. To the west lie the Cheviot Fringe, the Northumberland Sandstone Hills and Mid Northumberland; to the south it is continued by the South East Northumberland Coastal Plain.

The North Northumberland Coastal Plain lies along the coast of the county of Northumberland and is listed as Natural Area No. 1 and also as National Character Area 1 by Natural England, the UK government's advisor on the natural environment in England. The region is a coastal strip, around 70 kilometres long and 3 to 10 kilometres wide, that runs from the Scottish Border to Amble on the River Coquet. Its narrow, low lying, windswept terrain has wide views east towards the sea and west towards the Cheviots. The coastal scenery is diverse. The northern part has a 'hard' cliffed coast of spectacular high cliffs, offshore islands and rocky headlands, whilst the southern strip is a 'soft' alluvial coast of wide, sweeping sandy bays backed by sand dunes and intertidal flats backed by saltmarsh. Inland, the plain is intensively farmed, typically with open, mixed arable land and few trees. The valleys and coastal fringes are characterized by woodland and permanent pasture or semi-natural grassland.

Roughly a quarter of the NCA lies within the Northumberland Coast Area of Outstanding Natural Beauty and also within the North Northumberland Heritage Coast. The region contains four Special Areas of Conservation - Berwickshire and North Northumberland Coast SAC; Newham Fen SAC; River Tweed SAC; and Tweed Estuary SAC – three national nature reserves – Lindisfarne NNR, Farne Islands NNR and Newham Bog NNR – and 15 Sites of Special Scientific Interest, the latter totalling 1,296 hectares. Its major watercourses are the River Tweed, which the latter section of the river forms the border with Scotland in the north, the River Coquet in the far south, Whiteadder Water and the River Aln.

Holy Island is an important historic site which incorporates Lindisfarne Castle and Priory. Other historic sites include Bamburgh, Dunstanburgh and Warkworth Castles.
