= Midvale Ridge =

Coordinates: 51.71°N 1.28°W

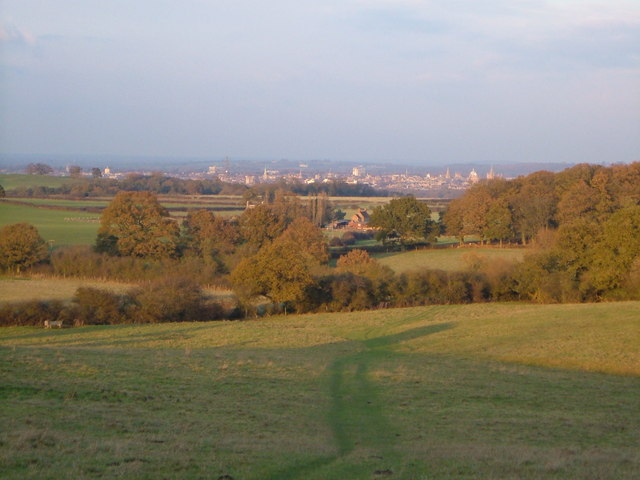
The Old Golf Course on Boar's Hill with Oxford's spires in the distance

The Midvale Ridge is a natural region in South Central England formed by a band of low-lying limestone hills that run from southwest to northeast, from Swindon to the Vale of Aylesbury. It has been designated as National Character Area 109 by Natural England, the UK Government's advisors on the natural environment.

The Midvale Ridge crosses the counties of Wiltshire, Oxfordshire and Buckinghamshire. It is surrounded by the lowlands of the Oxfordshire clay vales and offers good views over the local countryside. The area is dominated by agriculture with a mixed arable/ pastoral farming landscape. Cereals are the most important arable crop.

The main settlements are the town of Swindon in the west, and the city of Oxford, in the centre. Otherwise the area is relatively sparsely populated with small nucleated villages along the crest of the ridge and along the springline. Soils comprise a mix of heavy rendzinas, stagnogleys and lighter sandy brown earths with small patches of sandy soils.

The area has a number of important geological sites and has yielded fossils of international importance, including the holotypes for several ammonite species and several species of prehistoric sponges known only from the Faringdon area.

== Principal summits ==
Hills within the NCA with more than 30 metres of prominence are listed below:

Hill	Elevation	Prominence	Grid reference
Muswell Hill	198 m (650 ft)	126 m	SP641153
North Hill	190.3 m (624 ft)	39.1 m	SP654141
Quainton Hill	185.8 m (610 ft)	89.7 m	SP750213
Shotover Hill	171 m (561 ft)	107 m	SP563062
Bunshill	165 m (541 ft)	46 m	SP784213
Wytham Hill	164.3 m (539 ft)	94.9 m	SP458082
Pickett's Heath	164 m (538 ft)	86 m	SP482029
Lodge Hill	164 m (538 ft)	80 m	SP731165
Badbury Hill	162.4 m (533 ft)	72.1 m	SU261947
Hurst Hill	159 m (522 ft)	32 m	SP476041
Ashendon Hill	157.6 m (517 ft)	74 m	SP703140
Faringdon Hill	153 m (502 ft)	46 m	SU297956
Dorton Hill	151 m (495 ft)	57 m	SP680127
Blunsdon Hill	148 m (486 ft)	48 m	SU144900
Okus Hill	148 m (486 ft)	34 m	SU149835
Waddesdon Hill	147 m (482 ft)	53 m	SP758153
Beckley Hill	141 m (463 ft)	46 m	SP562105
Red Hill	134 m (440 ft)	31 m	SP585073
Hannington Hill	127.3 m (418 ft)	33.9 m	SU172926
Windmill Hill	102.4 m (336 ft)	37.8 m	SU552984
