= Border Moors and Forests =

NCA & Upland plateau in far-northern England

Coordinates: 55°14′59″N 2°21′48″W

- Ceremonial county: Northumberland; Cumbria
- Country: England
- Sovereign state: United Kingdom

Border Moors and Forests NCA is an upland plateau region in Northern England between the North East and North West regions, and touching the Anglo-Scottish border. The region, like much of the northern English uplands, is sparsely populated, with scattered farming and hardy shepherding in river valleys. Because of this sparse population, 39% of the region is part of the Northumberland National Park in the southeast and several military assets are placed here, both modern and ancient. The NCA is of lower elevation to the Cheviot Hills to the east. The A68 is the only main road going through the region. Conifer plantations, moorland, bogs, wet heaths make up the landscape of the region, which only allows for rough grazing of sheep in most areas outside of the valleys. Afforestation is a major environmental factor within the 20th and 21st centuries, as the Kielder Forest is the largest planted forest in northern Europe and has destroyed many native mires and peat bogs of the region. As such in the 21st century preserving the moors has been a top priority in the region as its habitat is home to high biodiversity and the region also serves as an important storer of carbon in its moors.

== Hydrology ==
The region is drained through a measure of rivers flowing both to the west and to the east. The rivers North Tyne and Rede, starting at the Scottish border to the north, form valleys that cut through the plateau and form semi-arable valleys in North Tynedale and Redesdale. These rivers are both tributaries of the River Tyne, which flows to the southeast into the North Sea. The River Lyne and Irthing, which start further south than the former two rivers flow south-west to the Solway Firth in the Irish Sea. The waters of the North Tyne are controlled by the Kielder Water reservoir, opened in 1982, which is situated in the north of the NCA, surrounding the reservoir is a large area of afforested wood called the Kielder Forest.
