= National Character Area =

Geographical areas of England

A National Character Area (NCA) is a subdivision of England based on a combination of landscape, biodiversity, geodiversity and economic factors. There are 159 National Character Areas, which follow natural, rather than administrative, boundaries. They are defined by Natural England, the UK government's advisors on the natural environment.

== NCA profiles ==
As part of its responsibilities in delivering the Natural Environment White Paper, Biodiversity 2020 and the European Landscape Convention, Natural England is revising its National Character Area profiles to make environmental evidence and information easily available to a wider audience. Revised profiles for all 159 NCAs were published in September 2014. The new NCAs are being published in a rolling program and can be found on the Natural England website.

NCAs are areas that share similar landscape characteristics, and which follow natural lines in the landscape rather than administrative boundaries, making them a good decision-making framework for the natural environment. National Character Area profiles are guidance documents which can help communities to inform their decision-making about the places that they live in and care for. The information they contain will support the planning of conservation initiatives at a landscape scale, inform the delivery of nature improvement areas and encourage broader partnership working through local nature partnerships. The profiles will also help to inform choices about how land is managed and can change.

Each profile includes a description of the natural and cultural features that shape our landscapes, how the landscape has changed over time, the current key drivers for ongoing change, and a broad analysis of each area's characteristics and ecosystem services. Statements of environmental opportunity (SEOs) are suggested, which draw on this integrated information. The SEOs offer guidance on the critical issues, which could help to achieve sustainable growth and a more secure environmental future.

NCA profiles are working documents which draw on current evidence and knowledge. Natural England aim to refresh and update them periodically as new information becomes available.

== NCAs by region ==
Natural England list the Natural Character Areas by regions. Because some overlap regional boundaries, they may be shown in more than one region.

=== North East ===
1. North Northumberland Coastal Plain (Northumberland)
2. Northumberland Sandstone Hills (Northumberland)
3. Cheviot Fringe (Northumberland)
4. Cheviots (Northumberland)
5. Border Moors & Forests (Northumberland and Cumbria)
10. North Pennines (Durham, Cumbria, Northumberland and North Yorkshire)
11. Tyne Gap & Hadrian's Wall (Northumberland and Cumbria)
12. Mid Northumberland (Northumberland)
13. South East Northumberland Coastal Plain (Northumberland and Tyne & Wear)
14. Tyne & Wear Lowlands (Tyne & Wear, Northumberland and Durham)
15. Durham Magnesian Limestone Plateau (Durham, Tyne & Wear and Cleveland)
16. Durham Coalfield Pennine Fringe (Durham, Northumberland, Tyne & Wear and Cleveland)
22. Pennine Dales Fringe (North Yorkshire, Durham and West Yorkshire)
23. Tees Lowlands (Cleveland, North Yorkshire and Durham)
25. North York Moors and Cleveland Hills (North Yorkshire and Cleveland)

=== North West ===
5. Border Moors & Forests (Northumberland and Cumbria)
6. Solway Basin (Cumbria)
7. West Cumbria Coastal Plain (Cumbria)
8. Cumbria High Fells (Cumbria)
9. Eden Valley (Cumbria)
10. North Pennines (Durham, Cumbria, Northumberland and North Yorkshire)
11. Tyne Gap & Hadrian's Wall (Northumberland and Cumbria)
17. Orton Fells (Cumbria)
18. Howgill Fells (Cumbria)
19. South Cumbria Low Fells (Cumbria and Lancashire)
20. Morecambe Bay Limestones (Cumbria and Lancashire)
21. Yorkshire Dales (North Yorkshire, Cumbria, Lancashire and West Yorkshire)
31. Morecambe Coast & Lune Estuary (Lancashire)
32. Lancashire & Amounderness Plain (Lancashire and Merseyside)
33. Bowland Fringe & Pendle Hill (Lancashire and North Yorkshire)
34. Bowland Fells (Lancashire and North Yorkshire)
35. Lancashire Valleys (Lancashire and North Yorkshire)
36. Southern Pennines (West Yorkshire, Lancashire, North Yorkshire and Greater Manchester)
51. Dark Peak (Derbyshire, South Yorkshire, West Yorkshire and Greater Manchester)
53. South West Peak (Staffordshire, Cheshire and Derbyshire)
54. Manchester Pennine Fringe (Greater Manchester, Derbyshire, Cheshire and Lancashire)
55. Manchester Conurbation (Greater Manchester and Cheshire)
56. Lancashire Coal Measures (Greater Manchester, Merseyside, Lancashire and Cheshire)
57. Sefton Coast (Merseyside and Lancashire)
58. Merseyside Conurbation (Merseyside, Lancashire and Cheshire)
59. Wirral (Merseyside and Cheshire)
60. Mersey Valley (Cheshire, Merseyside and Greater Manchester)
61. Shropshire, Cheshire & Staffordshire Plain (Cheshire, Shropshire, Staffordshire and Greater Manchester)
62. Cheshire Sandstone Ridge (Cheshire)

=== Yorkshire and the Humber ===
10. North Pennines (Durham, Cumbria, Northumberland and North Yorkshire)
21. Yorkshire Dales (North Yorkshire, Cumbria, Lancashire and West Yorkshire)
22. Pennine Dales Fringe (North Yorkshire, Durham and West Yorkshire)
23. Tees Lowlands (Cleveland, North Yorkshire and Durham)
24. Vale of Mowbray (North Yorkshire)
25. North Yorkshire Moors & Cleveland Hills (North Yorkshire and Cleveland)
26. Vale of Pickering (North Yorkshire)
27. Yorkshire Wolds (Humberside and North Yorkshire)
28. Vale of York (North Yorkshire and Humberside)
29. Howardian Hills (North Yorkshire)
30. Southern Magnesian Limestone (North Yorkshire, West Yorkshire, South Yorkshire, Derbyshire and Nottinghamshire)
33. Bowland Fringe & Pendle Hill (Lancashire and North Yorkshire)
34. Bowland Fells (Lancashire and North Yorkshire)
35. Lancashire Valleys (Lancashire and North Yorkshire)
36. Southern Pennines (West Yorkshire, Lancashire, North Yorkshire and Greater Manchester)
37. Yorkshire Southern Pennine Fringe (West Yorkshire, South Yorkshire and Derbyshire)
38. Nottinghamshire, Derbyshire & Yorkshire Coalfield (West Yorkshire, South Yorkshire, Derbyshire and Nottinghamshire)
39. Humberhead Levels (Humberside, North Yorkshire, South Yorkshire, Nottinghamshire, Lincolnshire and West Yorkshire)
40. Holderness (Humberside)
41. Humber Estuary (Humberside)
42. Lincolnshire Coast & Marshes (Lincolnshire and Humberside)
43. Lincolnshire Wolds (Lincolnshire and Humberside)
44. Central Lincolnshire Vale (Lincolnshire and Humberside)
45. Northern Lincolnshire Edge with Coversands (Lincolnshire and Humberside)
50. Derbyshire Peak Fringe & Lower Derwent (Derbyshire)
51. Dark Peak (Derbyshire, South Yorkshire, West Yorkshire and Greater Manchester)

=== East Midlands ===
30. Southern Magnesian Limestone (North Yorkshire, West Yorkshire, South Yorkshire, Derbyshire and Nottinghamshire)
37. Yorkshire Southern Pennine Fringe (West Yorkshire, South Yorkshire and Derbyshire)
38. Nottinghamshire, Derbyshire & Yorkshire Coalfield (West Yorkshire, South Yorkshire, Derbyshire and Nottinghamshire)
39. Humberhead Levels (Humberside, North Yorkshire, South Yorkshire, Nottinghamshire, Lincolnshire and West Yorkshire)
42. Lincolnshire Coast & Marshes (Lincolnshire and Humberside)
43. Lincolnshire Wolds (Lincolnshire and Humberside)
44. Central Lincolnshire Vale (Lincolnshire and Humberside)
45. Northern Lincolnshire Edge with Coversands (Lincolnshire and Humberside)
46. The Fens (Lincolnshire, Cambridgeshire, Norfolk and Suffolk)
47. South Lincolnshire Edge (Lincolnshire)
48. Trent & Belvoir Vales (Nottinghamshire, Lincolnshire and Leicestershire)
49. Sherwood (Nottinghamshire)
50. Derbyshire Peak Fringe & Lower Derwent (Derbyshire)
51. Dark Peak (Derbyshire, South Yorkshire, West Yorkshire and Greater Manchester)
52. White Peak (Derbyshire and Staffordshire)
53. South West Peak (Staffordshire, Cheshire and Derbyshire)
54. Manchester Pennine Fringe (Greater Manchester, Derbyshire, Cheshire and Lancashire)
64. Potteries & Churnet Valley (Staffordshire and Derbyshire)
68. Needwood & South Derbyshire Claylands (Derbyshire and Staffordshire)
69. Trent Valley Washlands (Derbyshire, Leicestershire, Nottinghamshire, Staffordshire and Warwickshire)
70. Melbourne Parklands (Derbyshire, Leicestershire and Staffordshire)
71. Leicestershire & South Derbyshire Coalfield (Leicestershire and Derbyshire)
72. Mease/Sence Lowlands (Leicestershire, Warwickshire, Staffordshire and Derbyshire)
73. Charnwood (Leicestershire)
74. Leicestershire & Nottinghamshire Wolds (Leicestershire, Nottinghamshire, Rutland and Lincolnshire)
75. Kesteven Uplands (Lincolnshire, Rutland, Leicestershire and Cambridgeshire)
88. Bedfordshire & Cambridgeshire Claylands (Bedfordshire, Cambridgeshire, Buckinghamshire, Northamptonshire, Oxfordshire and Hertfordshire)
89. Northamptonshire Vales (Northamptonshire, Leicestershire, Rutland, Cambridgeshire and Bedfordshire)
91. Yardley-Whittlewood Ridge (Northamptonshire, Buckinghamshire and Bedfordshire)
92. Rockingham Forest (Northamptonshire, Cambridgeshire, Rutland and Lincolnshire)
93. High Leicestershire (Leicestershire and Rutland)
94. Leicestershire Vales (Leicestershire, Warwickshire, West Midlands and Northamptonshire)
95. Northamptonshire Uplands (Northamptonshire, Oxfordshire, Warwickshire and Leicestershire)
96. Dunsmore & Feldon (Warwickshire, Northamptonshire and West Midlands)
107. Cotswolds (Gloucestershire, Oxfordshire, Wiltshire, Avon, Somerset, Warwickshire, Northamptonshire, Worcestershire and Buckinghamshire)

=== West Midlands ===
52. White Peak (Derbyshire and Staffordshire)
53. South West Peak (Staffordshire, Cheshire and Derbyshire)
61. Shropshire, Cheshire & Staffordshire Plain (Cheshire, Shropshire, Staffordshire and Greater Manchester)
63. Oswestry Uplands (Shropshire)
64. Potteries & Churnet Valley (Staffordshire and Derbyshire)
65. Shropshire Hills (Shropshire and Herefordshire)
66. Mid Severn Sandstone Plateau (Shropshire, Worcestershire, Staffordshire and West Midlands)
67. Cannock Chase & Cank Wood (Staffordshire, West Midlands and Warwickshire)
68. Needwood & South Derbyshire Claylands (Derbyshire and Staffordshire)
69. Trent Valley Washlands (Derbyshire, Leicestershire, Nottinghamshire, Staffordshire and Warwickshire)
70. Melbourne Parklands (Derbyshire, Leicestershire and Staffordshire)
72. Mease/Sence Lowlands (Leicestershire, Warwickshire, Staffordshire and Derbyshire)
94. Leicestershire Vales (Leicestershire, Warwickshire, West Midlands and Northamptonshire)
95. Northamptonshire Uplands (Northamptonshire, Oxfordshire, Warwickshire and Leicestershire)
96. Dunsmore & Feldon (Warwickshire, Northamptonshire and West Midlands)
97. Arden (Warwickshire, West Midlands, Worcestershire and Staffordshire)
98. Clun & North West Herefordshire Hills (Shropshire and Herefordshire)
99. Black Mountains & Golden Valley (Herefordshire)
100. Herefordshire Lowlands (Herefordshire, Shropshire, Worcestershire and Gloucestershire)
101. Herefordshire Plateau (Herefordshire and Worcestershire)
102. Teme Valley (Worcestershire, Shropshire and Herefordshire)
103. Malvern Hills (Herefordshire and Worcestershire)
104. South Herefordshire & Over Severn (Herefordshire and Gloucestershire)
105. Forest of Dean & Lower Wye (Gloucestershire and Herefordshire)
106. Severn & Avon Vales (Gloucestershire, Worcestershire, Avon and Warwickshire)
107. Cotswolds (Gloucestershire, Oxfordshire, Wiltshire, Avon, Somerset, Warwickshire, Northamptonshire, Worcestershire and Buckinghamshire)

=== East of England ===
46. The Fens (Lincolnshire, Cambridgeshire, Norfolk and Suffolk)
76. North West Norfolk (Norfolk)
77. North Norfolk Coast (Norfolk)
78. Central North Norfolk (Norfolk)
79. North East Norfolk & Flegg (Norfolk)
80. The Broads (Norfolk and Suffolk)
81. Greater Thames Estuary (Essex, Kent and Greater London)
82. Suffolk Coast & Heaths (Suffolk, Norfolk and Essex)
83. South Norfolk & High Suffolk Claylands (Norfolk and Suffolk)
84. Mid Norfolk (Norfolk)
85. The Brecks (Norfolk, Suffolk and Cambridgeshire)
86. South Suffolk & North Essex Clayland (Essex, Suffolk, Hertfordshire and Cambridgeshire)
87. East Anglian Chalk (Cambridgeshire, Hertfordshire, Essex, Suffolk and Bedfordshire)
88. Bedfordshire and Cambridgeshire Claylands (Bedfordshire, Cambridgeshire, Buckinghamshire, Northamptonshire, Oxfordshire and Hertfordshire)
89. Northamptonshire Vales (Northamptonshire, Leicestershire, Rutland, Cambridgeshire and Bedfordshire)
90. Bedfordshire Greensand Ridge (Bedfordshire, Buckinghamshire and Cambridgeshire)
91. Yardley-Whittlewood Ridge (Northamptonshire, Buckinghamshire and Bedfordshire)
92. Rockingham Forest (Northamptonshire, Cambridgeshire, Rutland and Lincolnshire)
110. Chilterns (Buckinghamshire, Hertfordshire, Oxfordshire, Bedfordshire and Berkshire)
111. Northern Thames Basin (Essex, Hertfordshire and Greater London)
115. Thames Valley (Berkshire, Buckinghamshire, Greater London, Surrey, Hertfordshire and Oxfordshire)

=== South East and London ===
81. Greater Thames Estuary (Essex, Kent and Greater London)
88. Bedfordshire and Cambridgeshire Claylands (Bedfordshire, Cambridgeshire, Buckinghamshire, Northamptonshire, Oxfordshire and Hertfordshire)
90. Bedfordshire Greensand Ridge (Bedfordshire, Buckinghamshire and Cambridgeshire)
91. Yardley-Whittlewood Ridge (Northamptonshire, Buckinghamshire and Bedfordshire)
95. Northamptonshire Uplands (Northamptonshire, Oxfordshire, Warwickshire and Leicestershire)
107. Cotswolds (Gloucestershire, Oxfordshire, Wiltshire, Avon, Somerset, Warwickshire, Northamptonshire, Worcestershire and Buckinghamshire)
108. Upper Thames Clay Vales (Oxfordshire, Buckinghamshire, Wiltshire and Gloucestershire)
109. Midvale Ridge (Oxfordshire, Wiltshire and Buckinghamshire)
110. Chilterns (Buckinghamshire, Hertfordshire, Oxfordshire, Bedfordshire and Berkshire)
111. Northern Thames Basin (Essex, Hertfordshire and Greater London)
112. Inner London (Greater London)
113. North Kent Plain (Kent and Greater London)
114. Thames Basin Lowlands (Surrey, Greater London and Hampshire)
115. Thames Valley (Berkshire, Buckinghamshire, Greater London, Surrey, Hertfordshire and Oxfordshire)
116. Berkshire and Marlborough Downs (Wiltshire, Berkshire and Oxfordshire)
119. North Downs (Kent, Greater London and Surrey)
120. Wealden Greensand (Surrey, Kent, Hampshire and West Sussex)
121. Low Weald (East Sussex, West Sussex, Kent and Surrey)
122. High Weald (East Sussex, West Sussex, Kent and Surrey)
123. Romney Marshes (Kent and East Sussex)
124. Pevensey Levels (East Sussex)
125. South Downs (Hampshire, West Sussex and East Sussex)
126. South Coast Plain (West Sussex, Hampshire and East Sussex)
127. Isle of Wight (Isle of Wight)
128. South Hampshire Lowlands (Hampshire and West Sussex)
129. Thames Basin Heaths (Berkshire, Hampshire, Surrey and Wiltshire)
130. Hampshire Downs (Hampshire, Wiltshire and Surrey)
131. New Forest (Hampshire and Dorset)
132. Salisbury Plain & West Wiltshire Downs (Wiltshire and Hampshire)
134. Dorset Downs and Cranborne Chase (Dorset, Wiltshire and Hampshire)
135. Dorset Heaths (Dorset and Hampshire)

=== South West ===
100. Herefordshire Lowlands (Herefordshire, Shropshire, Worcestershire and Gloucestershire)
103. Malvern Hills (Herefordshire and Worcestershire)
104. South Herefordshire and Over Severn (Herefordshire and Gloucestershire)
105. Forest of Dean and Lower Wye (Gloucestershire and Herefordshire)
106. Severn and Avon Vales (Gloucestershire, Worcestershire, Avon and Warwickshire)
107. Cotswolds (Gloucestershire, Oxfordshire, Wiltshire, Avon, Somerset, Warwickshire, Northamptonshire, Worcestershire and Buckinghamshire)
108. Upper Thames Clay Vales (Oxfordshire, Buckinghamshire, Wiltshire and Gloucestershire)
109. Midvale Ridge (Oxfordshire, Wiltshire and Buckinghamshire)
116. Berkshire and Marlborough Downs (Wiltshire, Berkshire and Oxfordshire)
117. Avon Vales (Wiltshire and Somerset)
118. Bristol, Avon Valleys and Ridges (Avon, Somerset and Gloucestershire)
129. Thames Basin Heaths (Berkshire, Hampshire, Surrey and Wiltshire)
130. Hampshire Downs (Hampshire, Wiltshire and Surrey)
131. New Forest (Hampshire and Dorset)
132. Salisbury Plain and West Wiltshire Downs (Wiltshire and Hampshire)
133. Blackmoor Vale and Vale of Wardour (Dorset, Somerset and Wiltshire)
134. Dorset Downs and Cranborne Chase (Dorset, Wiltshire and Hampshire)
135. Dorset Heaths (Dorset and Hampshire)
136. South Purbeck (Dorset)
137. Isle of Portland (Dorset)
138. Weymouth Lowlands (Dorset)
139. Marshwood and Powerstock Vales (Dorset)
140. Yeovil Scarplands (Somerset and Dorset)
141. Mendip Hills (Somerset and Avon)
142. Somerset Levels and Moors (Somerset and Avon)
143. Mid Somerset Hills (Somerset)
144. Quantock Hills (Somerset)
145. Exmoor (Devon and Somerset)
146. Vale of Taunton and Quantock Fringes (Somerset and Devon)
147. Blackdowns (Devon, Somerset and Dorset)
148. Devon Redlands (Devon and Somerset)
149. The Culm (Devon, Cornwall and Somerset)
150. Dartmoor (Devon)
151. South Devon (Devon)
152. Cornish Killas (Cornwall)
153. Bodmin Moor (Cornwall)
154. Hensbarrow (Cornwall)
155. Carnmenellis (Cornwall)
156. West Penwith (Cornwall)
157. The Lizard (Cornwall)
158. Isles of Scilly (Cornwall)
159. Lundy (Devon)
