= Northumberland Coast National Landscape =

Area of Outstanding Natural Beauty in England

Coordinates: 55°35′18″N 1°39′51″W

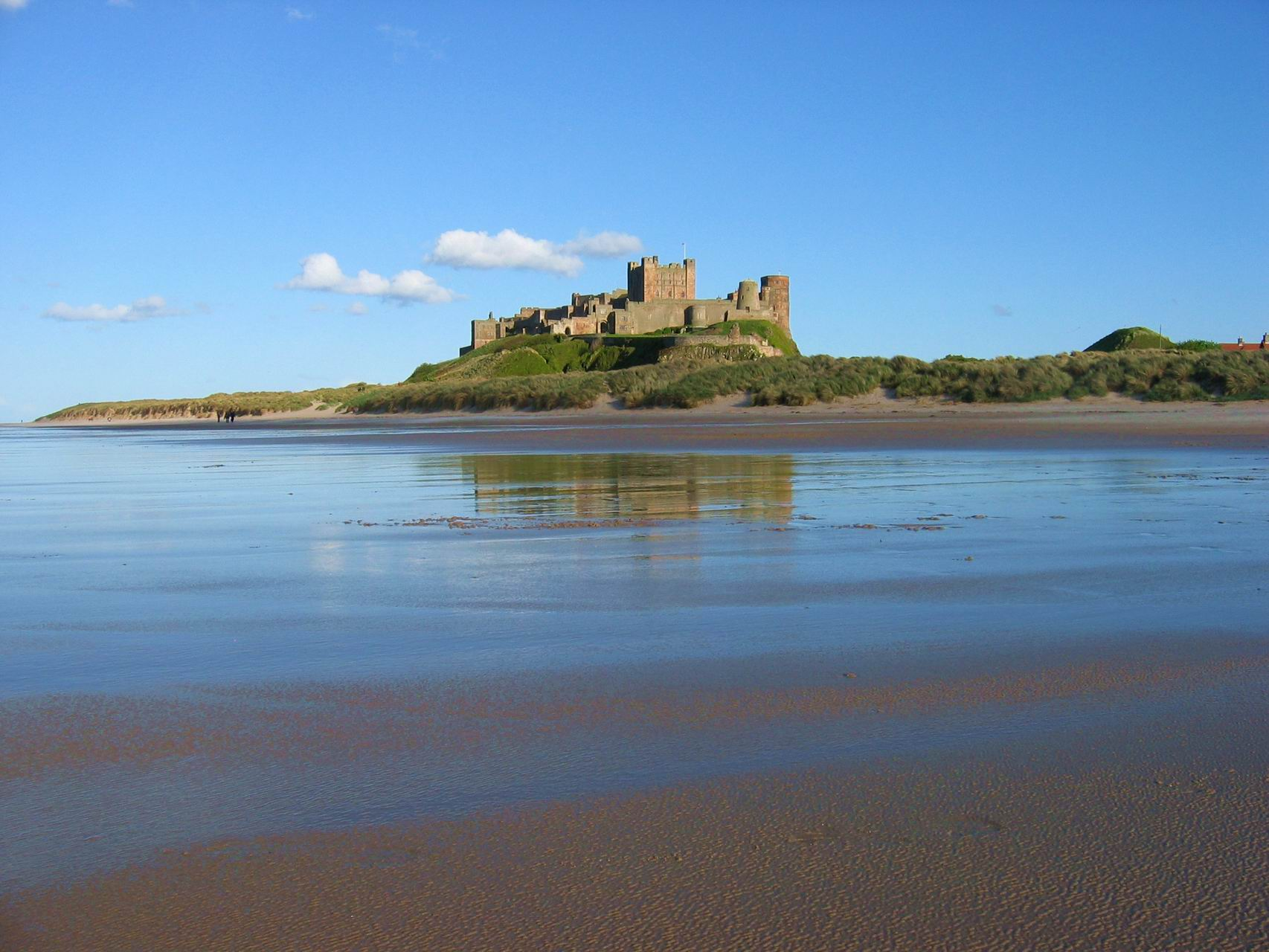
- Bamburgh Castle on the Northumberland Coast

- Location of the Northumberland Coast AONB in the UK
- Location: Northumberland, England
- Established: 1958

The Northumberland Coast National Landscape is a designated Area of Outstanding Natural Beauty (AONB) covering 40 miles (64 km) of coastline from Berwick-Upon-Tweed to the River Coquet estuary in the Northeast of England. Features include: Alnmouth, Bamburgh, Beadnell, Budle Bay, Cocklawburn Beach, Craster, Dunstanburgh Castle, the Farne Islands, Lindisfarne and Seahouses. It lies within the natural region of the North Northumberland Coastal Plain.

== Geography ==
The coastal area is situated to the east of the A1 road. It is sparsely populated and includes sandy beaches, sand dunes, rugged cliffs and isolated islands. It includes two National Nature Reserves. Fortresses and peel towers along the coast are evidence of past conflicts between the English and Scots in this border area. Coal fields are nearby and sea coal is washed up on the beaches.

== Principal summits ==
As a low-lying coastal region, the National Landscape has few hills. These are the only two with 30 metres of prominence:

- Bamburgh Castle, 46 m (151 ft), drop 33 m, grid reference NU184350
- Dunstanburgh Castle, 36.2 m (119 ft), drop 30.1 m, grid reference NU256219

== See also ==
- Northumberland
- Northeast England
