= Stagnogley =

Type of soil

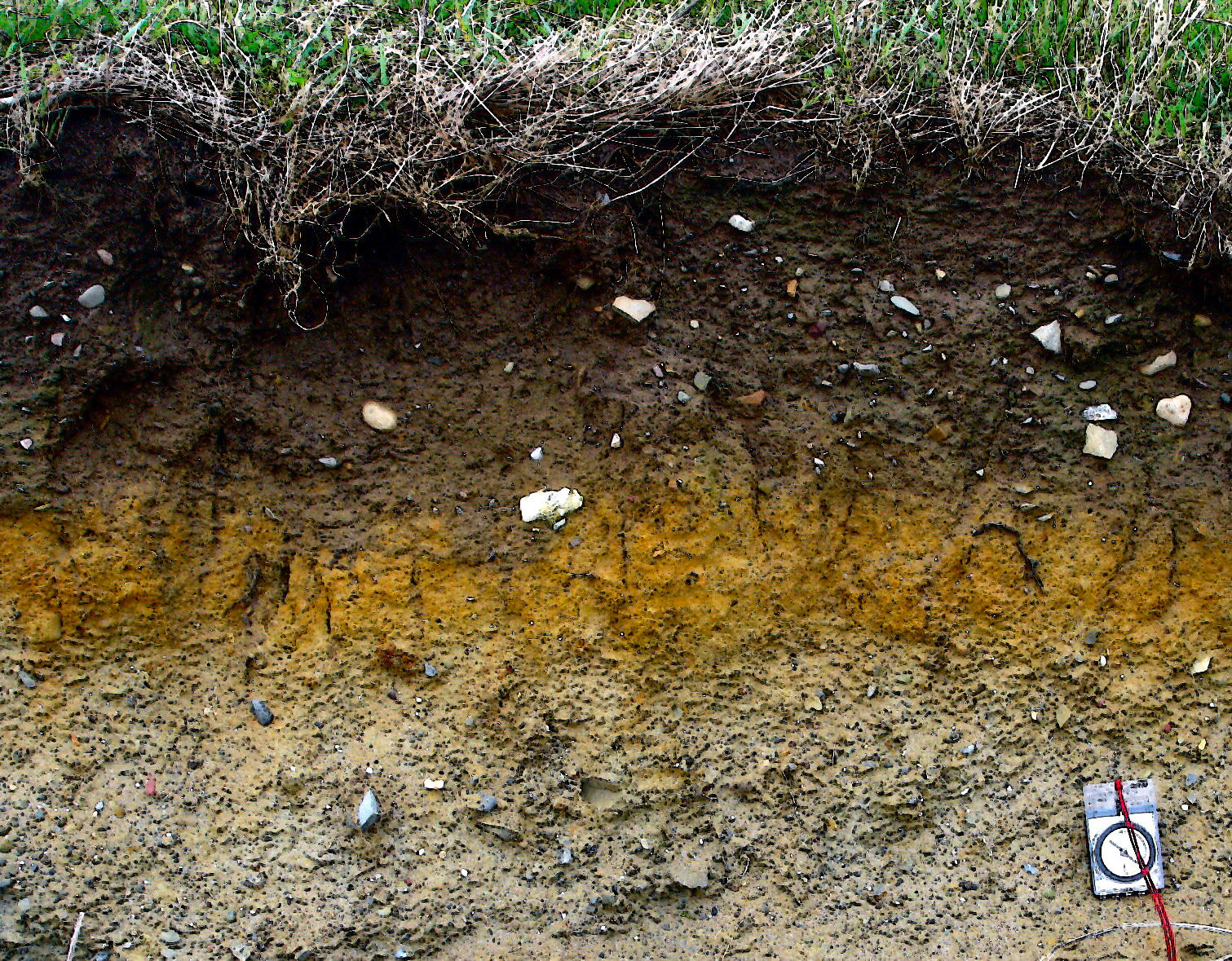
Stagnogley soil

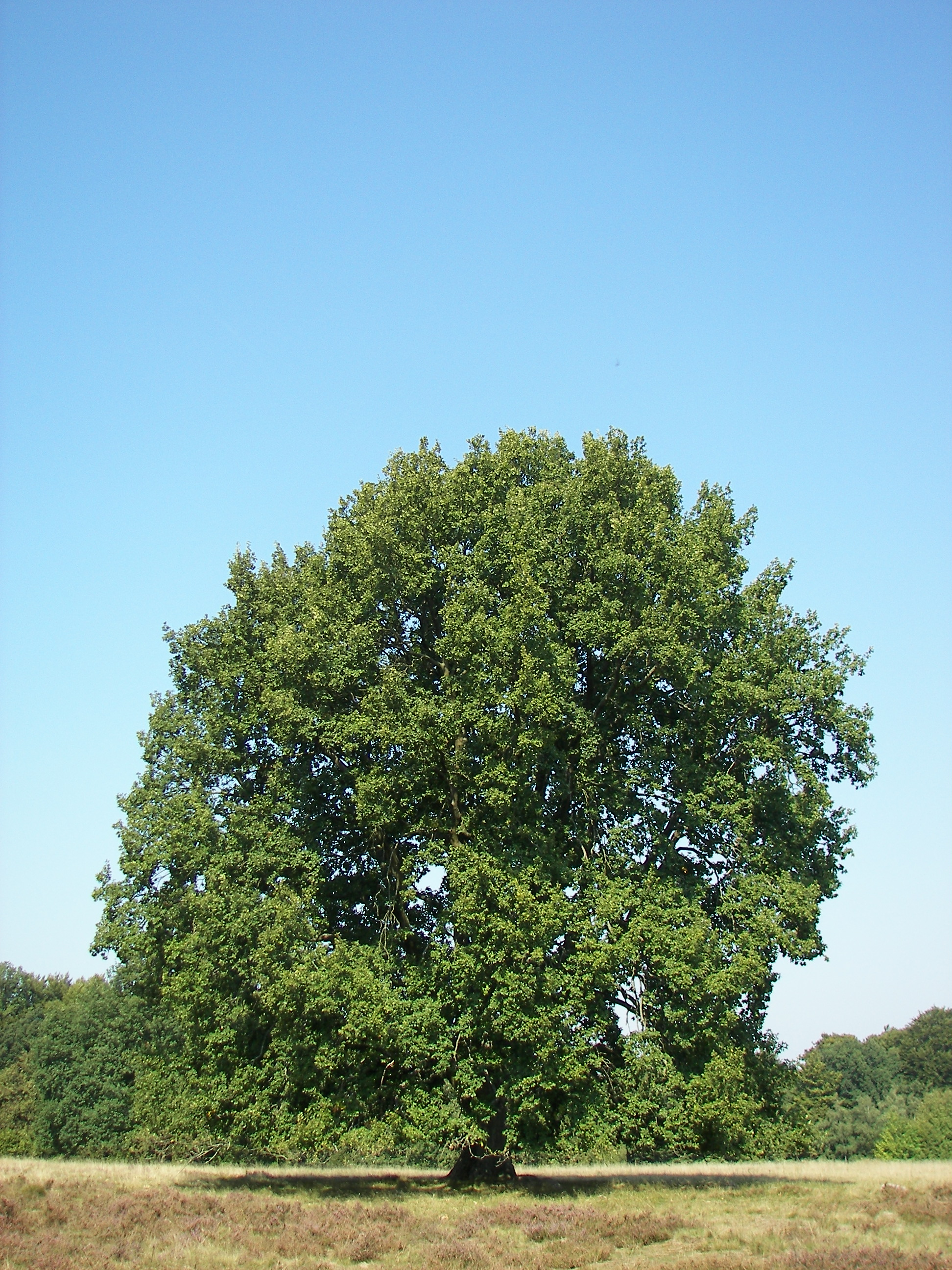
English oak near Wilsede, Germany

A stagnogley soil is a type of non-alluvial, non-calcareous soil that is typically loamy or clayey soil with a dense, impervious, subsurface horizon. Stagnogley soils are related to the pseudogleys and are classified as gleyic soils. The name "stagnogley" comes from the soil's gley dynamics. This hygroscopic soil is nutrient-poor, often highly acidic, and poorly aerated, making it unsuitable for farming due to poor crop growth. With a shallow topsoil layer and a moderately stony subsoil, stagnogley soil is mainly used for woodland, supporting tree species that thrive well in these conditions, such as the English Oak.

== Formation ==
This type of soil, whose topsoil becomes bleached due to continual waterlogging, is often formed on sand-rich material over dense, sandy-loamy to silty-clayey subsoil—also called Sandkerf in German—in cool, moist climatic zones. As a result of frequent waterlogging throughout the seasons at low temperatures, minerals like iron and magnesium are released and deposited in the sandy topsoil to the sides. Where the soil is saturated all-year round, it turns into bog stagnogley and, eventually, into bog. Examples, known as missen occur in the Black Forest in Germany.

== Extent ==
Stagnogley soils occur in perhumid climates and also on steep slopes. They are found, for example, in the central European Central Upland ranges of the Black Forest, Ore Mountains and Eifel in waterlogged places, as well as on the Midvale Ridge in the UK. Due to the discharge of heavy metals, they occur with oxigleys.
