= Lincolnshire Marsh =

Landform on the east coast of England

Coordinates: 53.426°N 0.161°E

The Lincolnshire Marsh is a belt of reclaimed salt marsh and sand dune in Lincolnshire, England, between the Lincolnshire Wolds and the North Sea coast. It is up to seven kilometres wide. It is part of one of the national character areas defined by Natural England.

== Geology ==
During the Ipswichian interglacial the sea level was higher than the present one so that the seaward edge of the Lincolnshire Wolds was eroded. The hills still drop abruptly to the coastal lowland as a result. During the Devensian glacial the ice sheet flowed up to this steep slope and the ice deposited glacial debris. During the Flandrian, since the ice melted, the sea has risen and deposited marine silt and clay over the seaward part of this glacial till. The villages lie on these zones, one band at the foot of the Wolds, one band at the seaward edge of the glacial deposits and a third, less regularly arranged in parts of the marsh that have been artificially enclosed from time to time to keep the sea out.
