= Northumberland Sandstone Hills =

Natural region in England

Coordinates: 55.34077°N 1.9162°W

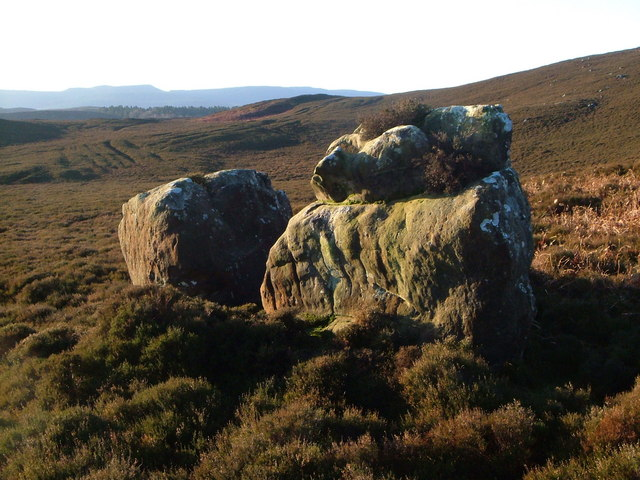
The Priest and Clerk sandstone rocks east of Cartington Hill, with the Simonside Hills in the distance

The Northumberland Sandstone Hills are a major natural region in the English county of Northumberland. The hills form distinctive skylines with generally level tops, northwest facing scarps and craggy outcrops offering views to the Cheviots further west.

The Northumberland Sandstone Hills lie not far from the coast of Northumberland and the region is listed as National Character Area no. 2 by Natural England, the UK Government's advisor on the natural environment. The region covers an area of 72,694 hectares (281 sq mi), beginning at Kyloe in the north and running in a strip roughly 10–15 kilometres (6–9 mi) wide and parallel to the coastal plain as far as Alnwick, where it changes direction to head southwest via Thrunton Wood, Rothbury Forest and Harwood Forest to the area of Throckington and the River Rede, passing over the highest peaks in the area, including Tosson Hill (1,444 feet (440 m)) in the Simonside Hills. The region has a range of semi-natural habitats: moorland with heather and rough, acid grassland mosaics on the thin, sandy soils of the higher steeper slopes and broken ground, transitioning through scrub, and oak or birch woodland to improved farmland and parkland on the lower slopes. Wet peaty flushes, mires, loughs and small reservoirs are dotted throughout the area and there are many caves, including St Cuthbert's Cave and Cateran Hole.

Fifteen per cent of the NCA lies within the Northumberland National Park; it also contains one Special Protection Area – Holburn Lake & Moss – and three Special Areas of Conservation – Simonside Hills, Harbottle Moors, and River Tweed – as well as eighteen Sites of Special Scientific Interest, the SSIs totalling 3,771 hectares (14.6 sq mi). Its major watercourses are the rivers Aln, Till, Coquet, Font and Rede, and the Fallowlees Burn.

== Hill ranges ==
Smaller hill ranges within the Northumberland Sandstone Hills include the Simonside Hills and Harbottle Hills in the south, and Alnwick Moor, Chillingham Ridge, the Doddington Moors and Doddington North Moor-Ford Moss in the north. Their elevations generally reduced in height towards the north.
