= Lincolnshire coast =

Part of the English coastline

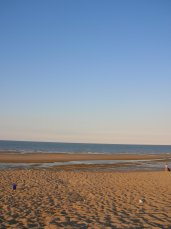
A Lincolnshire beach in summer.

The coast of Lincolnshire runs for more than 50 miles (80 km) down the North Sea coast of eastern England, from the estuary of the Humber (which divides it from East Yorkshire) to the marshlands of the Wash, where it meets Norfolk. This stretch of coastline has long been associated with tourism, fishing and trade.

== Towns and villages ==
Major settlements on the Lincolnshire coast include the ports of Grimsby and Immingham, and the seaside resorts of Cleethorpes, Mablethorpe (with Sutton-on-Sea), Ingoldmells and Skegness.

Smaller towns and villages on the coast include South Ferriby, Barton, Barrow, New Holland, Saltfleet & Saltfleetby, Theddlethorpe, Trusthorpe, Sandilands, Anderby Creek, Chapel St Leonards and Freiston Shore.

The port of Boston, though some six miles (9.7 km) from the open sea, is often considered a coastal town. Boston Haven, a tidal stretch of the River Witham, made Boston one of the most significant ports in England between the 11th and 17th centuries. Boston was a "staple town" and a member of the Hanseatic League.

== Geography ==
The character of Lincolnshire as it meets the sea is overwhelmingly flat. In the north of the county, the Humberhead Levels and the land reclamation reclaimed Lincolnshire Marsh are pretty much at sea level, while in the south the Fens give way to acres of salt marshes. The tide is prevented from re-flooding the land by miles of man-made earth sea banks.

Looking inland from any point on the coast between Grimsby and Boston, the nearest visible geographical feature is a low line of hills, the Lincolnshire Wolds. There are more than thirty miles of sandy beaches (in an unbroken line from Cleethorpes to Gibraltar Point), which give way in the north and south to acres of salt marsh and estuarine mud.

The rivers Great Eau, Lud, Nene, Steeping, Welland and Witham all drain into the North Sea from Lincolnshire. The Humber (and its tributary the Trent) form the northern and western boundaries of the county.

Owing to the combined sediment carried by the Humber and the rivers of the Wash, and to the muddy clay sea floor, the waters off Lincolnshire are usually an opaque brown.

== History ==
From prehistory, the Lincolnshire coast was an important centre for the production of salt. At its peak in the 1950s, Grimsby was the largest and busiest fishing port in the world.

In 1953, a storm tide overwhelmed Lincolnshire's sea defences, and the county was flooded as far inland as Alford. More than 300 people were killed in Lincolnshire and neighbouring counties. Coastal defences (sea banks) were extensively rebuilt after 1953, but the threat of inundation of low-lying areas by a rising sea in an era of global warming worries many residents of the Lincolnshire coast.

In an effort to combat this threat (and that to wildlife of coastal squeeze), parts of the sea bank are deliberately being breached, and areas of the coast converted back to salt marsh in a process of "managed retreat".

From the shoreline of Sutton on Sea and various other places along the coast it is possible to see the curvature of the earth's surface.

- See also: North Sea flood of 1953.

== The Lincolnshire coast today ==
Tourism is still important for the area around Skegness – tens of thousands of holiday-makers and day-trippers from the industrial East Midlands (Mansfield, Nottingham) and South Yorkshire visit the town each year. The town has been home since 1936 to Sir Billy Butlin's first Butlins holiday camp, and the stretch of coast just north of Skegness has the greatest concentration of static caravans in Europe.

Farming, the mainstay of the Lincolnshire economy, takes place right under the shadow of the sea walls.

Grimsby is a centre for the UK's frozen food import and processing industry. It is known colloquially as The UK's (or Europe's) Food Town. Though the fishing industry has declined since the 1970s, Grimsby still has the UK's largest fish market, though little of the fish sold there is landed at Grimsby Docks. Despite the decline in fishing, the ports of Grimsby and Immingham are still a vital link in the UK's transport infrastructure (see below).

There is a wind farm near Mablethorpe, which generates 0.6 MW of electricity.

=== Transport ===
Lincolnshire's only stretch of motorway, the M180, terminates near the village of Barnetby le Wold, but the road continues as the A180 to Grimsby, thus linking the docks with Scunthorpe and the industrial towns and cities of South Yorkshire. The A16 joins Grimsby with Boston (via Louth), while the A52 links Boston and Skegness. Skegness itself lies at the eastern end of the A158 to Lincoln.

The coast is served by the Grimsby branch of the Sheffield to Lincoln line, the Cleethorpes-Barton line, and the Grantham to Skegness line. There are railway stations at Barrow, Barton, Boston, Cleethorpes, Grimsby (docks and town), New Holland and Skegness.

Lincolnshire RoadCar (now owned by Stagecoach) runs regular InterConnect buses linking the towns of the east coast with the other major population centres of Lincolnshire - the bus network is of vital importance in a rural county poorly-served by the railway network, and with an elderly population living in remote, scattered villages.

Grimsby and Immingham are major ports (together, they handle some 55.9 million tonnes of cargo per annum – the largest port in the UK in terms of tonnage); The port of Boston is less important than it was (though it still handles upwards of 1.5 million tonnes p.a.).

Humberside Airport is ten miles (16 km) west of Grimsby.

=== Nature ===
The marshes and reedbeds of the Wash and Humber are some of the most important areas for wading birds in the UK.

Lincolnshire's coastal nature reserves include: Gibraltar Point National Nature Reserve (NNR) south of Skegness, the Far Ings NNR on the Humber, Donna Nook NNR (a major pupping ground for Britain's grey seal population), Saltfleetby-Theddlethorpe Dunes NNR (all managed by the Lincolnshire Wildlife Trust), and Frampton Marsh and Freiston Shore RSPB reserves.
