= List of scheduled monuments in South Somerset =

South Somerset shown within Somerset and England

South Somerset is a local government district in Somerset, England. The South Somerset district covers an area of 370 square miles (958 km^{2}) ranging from the borders with Devon and Dorset to the edge of the Somerset Levels. It has a population of approximately 162,000. The administrative centre of the district is Yeovil.

A scheduled monument is a nationally important archaeological site or monument which is given legal protection by being placed on a list (or "schedule") by the Secretary of State for Culture, Media and Sport; Historic England takes the leading role in identifying such sites. The legislation governing this is the Ancient Monuments and Archaeological Areas Act 1979. The term "monument" can apply to the whole range of archaeological sites, and they are not always visible above ground. Such sites have to have been deliberately constructed by human activity. They range from prehistoric standing stones and burial sites, through Roman remains and medieval structures such as castles and monasteries, to later structures such as industrial sites and buildings constructed for the World Wars or the Cold War.

There are 69 scheduled monuments in South Somerset. Some of the oldest are Neolithic, Bronze Age or Iron Age including hillforts, such as Kenwalch's Castle and Bowl barrows. The Romano-British period is represented with several sites including the Low Ham Roman Villa which included an extensive mosaic floor, now on display in the Museum of Somerset. Religious sites are represented by Muchelney Abbey, which was probably founded in the 8th century, and Montacute Priory, a Cluniac priory of the Benedictine order, from the 11th. Bruton Abbey was founded by the Benedictines before becoming a house of Augustinian canons. Stoke sub Hamdon Priory was formed in 1304 as a chantry college rather than a priory. More recent sites include several motte-and-bailey castles such as Cary Castle, and church crosses which date from the Middle Ages. Several packhorse bridges, such as Bow Bridge, Plox also appear in the list. The most recent monuments include the Round House, a village lock-up in Castle Cary dating from 1779, and several duck decoys The monuments are listed below using the titles given in the English Heritage data sheets.

== Monuments ==
Name	Location	Type	Completed (Note: The date given is the date used by Historic England as significant for the initial building or that of an important part in the structure's description.)	Grid ref. (Note: The grid reference is based on the British national grid reference system, sometimes known as OSGB36, used by the Ordnance Survey.) Geo-coordinates	Notes	Entry number (Note: The "List Entry Number" is a unique number assigned to each listed building and scheduled monument by Historic England.)	Image	Ref.
A motte with two baileys immediately north of Park Pond	Castle Cary	Motte-and-bailey castle	Middle Ages	ST 64169 32192; 51°05′18″N 2°30′48″W	Cary Castle was built either by Walter of Douai or by his son Robert in the late 11th or early 12th century. In 1143, after the Battle of Wilton, Henry de Tracy gained control of Cary Castle and built another stronghold in front of the older castle; however this was demolished when William Fitz Robert, 2nd Earl of Gloucester and his troops arrived to take the castle. By 1468 the castle had been abandoned. Around that time a manor house was built on or adjacent to the site of the castle, possibly by Baron Zouche. It later passed to Edward Seymour, 1st Duke of Somerset but by the 1630s it was occupied by Edward Kirton. It was largely demolished at the end of the 18th century.	1019897	A motte with two baileys immediately north of Park Pond More images	
Augustinian priory, later abbey and associated pillow mound, at King's School	Bruton	Priory	12th century	ST 68464 34709; 51°06′40″N 2°27′07″W	Bruton Abbey was founded as a house of Augustinian canons in 1135, by William de Mohun, who later became the Earl of Somerset. It may have been a Benedictine priory before the Norman Conquest of England. After the dissolution of the monasteries the abbey was granted to a John Drew of Bristol, but later transferred to Sir Maurice Berkeley. The latter built a house on the site incorporating some of the buildings, but this was demolished in 1786.	1020015	Augustinian priory, later abbey and associated pillow mound, at King's School More images	
Ballands Castle	Penselwood	Motte-and-bailey castle	Middle Ages	ST 75360 31017; 51°04′42″N 2°21′12″W	Ballands Castle was a motte-and-bailey castle, probably built after the Norman Conquest of England in 1066. The castle sits close to the contemporary Norman castles of Cockroad Wood and Castle Orchard, and may have been built as part of a system of fortifications to control the surrounding area.The motte of the castle is now around 5 metres (16 ft) high, and up to 9 metres (30 ft) wide. The bailey lies to the south, and both the motte and the bailey are surrounded by ditches.	1014713	Upload Photo	
Barn W of Muchelney Abbey	Muchelney	Tithe barn	16th century	ST 42783 24914; 51°01′15″N 2°49′02″W	The tithe barn of Muchelney Abbey was used to store produce from the farms belonging to the abbey.	1006181	Upload Photo	
Bineham City deserted village	Long Sutton	Earthworks	Middle Ages	ST 50001 24886; 51°01′16″N 2°42′51″W	The remains of a medieval village occupied from the 13th to 17th centuries. Masonry foundations of rectangular buildings have been identified.	1006142	Upload Photo	
Bowl barrow 110 m south west of Spittle Pond Cottages	Wambrook	Bowl barrow	Bronze Age	ST 29402 08882; 50°52′30″N 3°00′17″W	A bowl barrow mound which is 24 metres (79 ft) in diameter and 0.7 metres (2 ft 4 in) high.	1020545	Upload Photo	
Bowl barrow known as 'Wimble Toot'	Babcary	Bowl barrow or Motte-and-bailey castle	Bronze Age or Norman	ST 56048 28003; 51°02′59″N 2°37′42″W	Wimble Toot is a circular earthwork, 27.4 metres (90 ft) across and 2.7 metres (8 ft 10 in) high, with a ditch on the north-west and south-east sides, on the top of a ridge, overlooking a brook which runs into the River Cary and the old Roman road of the Fosse Way. Generally the site is classified as a Bronze Age barrow, used for the burial of the dead, or a windmill mound. An alternative interpretation is that the site was a motte, built after the Norman Conquest of England.	1015279	Bowl barrow known as 'Wimble Toot' More images	
Bowl barrow on Charn Hill	Charlton Horethorne	Bowl barrow	Neolithic to Bronze Age	ST 66710 23488; 51°00′35″N 2°28′33″W	A bowl barrow approximately 16 metres (52 ft) in diameter and 3 metres (9.8 ft) high.	1014711	Upload Photo	
Chessels Roman villa	East Coker	Roman villa	Romano-British	ST 52874 13831; 50°55′19″N 2°40′18″W	In 1861 the site was uncovered and tesserae, tiles, slates and painted wall plaster were uncovered from a villa which may have burnt down.	1006186	Upload Photo	
Combe Beacon barrow	Combe St Nicholas	Bell barrow	Bronze Age	ST 29481 12279; 50°54′21″N 3°00′15″W	A bell barrow approximately 38 metres (125 ft) in diameter and 4 metres (13 ft) high. It was used as the site for a beacon in the 18th century.	1018633	Upload Photo	
Compton Dundon hillfort with Dundon Beacon, east of Dundon	Compton Dundon	Hillfort	Iron Age	ST 48452 32209; 51°05′13″N 2°44′13″W	Dundon Hill Hillfort is an Iron Age hillfort. South east of the site is a Bronze Age bowl barrow which, it has been suggested, was later modified as a Norman Motte, known as Dundon Beacon. The 5-hectare (12-acre) site is guarded by a single bank ranging from 0.5 to 2.5 metres (1.6 to 8.2 ft) high, however parts of the site have been damaged by quarrying. Flint flakes, Bronze Age pottery, and Iron Age pottery have also been found, which are now in the Museum of Somerset.	1014715	Compton Dundon hillfort with Dundon Beacon, east of Dundon	
Cross in St Aldhelm and St Eadburga churchyard	Broadway	Cross	13th century	ST 32959 15893; 50°56′19″N 2°57′20″W	The base of the cross has two steps. The shaft has two carved figures.	1017250	Upload Photo	
Cross in St Catherine's churchyard	Drayton	Cross	15th century	ST 40527 24762; 51°01′09″N 2°50′57″W	The octagonal base of the cross has three steps. The shaft of the cross is topped by a stone ball finial which are more recent than the base.	1018637	Cross in St Catherine's churchyard More images	
Cross in the churchyard of St John the Baptist 15 m south east of the church door	Brewham	Cross	Middle Ages	ST 71977 36126; 51°07′25″N 2°24′06″W	The cross has a rectangular base supporting an octagonal shaft from which the head is missing.	1018924	Cross in the churchyard of St John the Baptist 15 m south east of the church door	
Deserted medieval settlement and associated fields, Lytes Cary	Lytes Cary	Earthworks	Middle Ages	ST 53126 26545; 51°02′11″N 2°40′12″W	Earthworks within the grounds of Lytes Cary date from the medieval period. They now consist of low grassy banks.	1008253	Upload Photo	
Deserted medieval village of Nether Adber	Marston Magna	Earthworks	Middle Ages	ST 58815 21265; 50°59′21″N 2°35′18″W	Earthworks show the remains of several buildings gathered around a village green. At least one house was still occupied in the 16th century.	1008251	Deserted medieval village of Nether Adber	
Duck decoy on Middle Moor	Aller	Duck decoy	17th century	ST 40136 28150; 51°02′59″N 2°51′19″W	The remains of a six-pipe duck decoy constructed in 1676 and unused by the late 19th century.	1014451	Upload Photo	
Duck decoy 700 m WNW of Rookery Farm	Kingsdon	Duck decoy	18th or 19th century	ST 51865 28412; 51°03′11″N 2°41′17″W	The remains of a duck decoy close to the River Cary. It is now a small pond with an island.	1015206	Upload Photo	
Early Medieval and Medieval urban remains, Milborne Port	Milborne Port	Earthworks	Middle Ages	ST 67710 18572; 50°57′57″N 2°27′40″W	Dispersed remains of the early market town including post holes of buildings near Church Street.	1017393	Upload Photo	
Hamdon Hill camp	Stoke-sub-Hamdon	Hillfort	Iron Age	ST 48296 16427; 50°57′05″N 2°44′38″W	Ham Hill Hillfort is an Iron Age hillfort located on Ham Hill. It covers an area of 210 acres (85 ha), making it one of the largest hillforts in Britain. The site was also occupied during the Mesolithic and Neolithic periods and later during Roman and medieval eras.	1003678	Hamdon Hill camp	
Haselbury Bridge	Haselbury Plucknett	Bridge	14th century	ST 45851 10969; 50°53′44″N 2°46′17″W	A 14th-century stone bridge carrying a minor road over the River Parrett. The bridge is 4 metres (13 ft) wide and has two pointed arches.	1020497	Upload Photo	
Hillfort 475 m south of Howley Farm	Whitestaunton	Hillfort	Iron Age	ST 26505 08939; 50°52′35″N 3°02′43″W	Horse Pool Camp is a univallate Iron Age hillfort enclosure also known as Whitestaunton Camp. The hillfort is an oval shape that is 300 metres (980 ft) long and 150 metres (490 ft) wide.	1018636	Upload Photo	
Hillfort 550 yd (501 m) SE of Four Gates	Wambrook	Hillfort	Iron Age	ST 31092 07457; 50°51′45″N 2°58′50″W	The earthworks of a univallate hillfort. The site is 324 by 148 metres (1,063 by 486 ft), surrounded by a bank and outer ditch.	1006146	Upload Photo	
Ilchester Roman town	Ilchester	Earthworks	Romano-British	ST 52042 22873; 51°00′04″N 2°40′55″W	Lindinis was a small town in the Roman province of Britannia. A timber walled fort was established there around AD 60 and later a second fort seems to have been built. Originally surrounded by native round houses, these were later supplanted by a vicus or unplanned civil area of around 30 acres (120,000 m^{2}).	1006155	Upload Photo	
Kenwalch's Castle: a large univallate hillfort on Pen Hill	Charlton Musgrove	Hillfort	Iron Age	ST 74777 33536; 51°06′02″N 2°21′42″W	Kenwalch's Castle is probably an Iron Age hillfort that may have been converted into a Roman fortress. It covers an area of 1.6 hectares (4.0 acres). There is a single rampart and ditch which are well preserved in places. The road north from Penselwood village crosses the hillfort and probably passes through the original entrances.	1008257	Kenwalch's Castle: a large univallate hillfort on Pen Hill	
Later Iron Age enclosure, Ilchester Mead	Ilchester	Earthworks	Iron Age	ST 52011 22044; 50°59′45″N 2°41′07″W	The remains of an earth rampart and ditch system.	1006129	Upload Photo	
Low Ham Roman Villa	Low Ham	Roman villa	Romano-British	ST 43649 28874; 51°03′36″N 2°48′39″W	The villa appears to have been constructed around AD 340. Aerial photography has shown that there are a number of farm buildings around a large courtyard, although the excavations concentrated on the residential west wing and bath house. The large 14 foot (4.3 m) square mosaic depicts the story of Aeneas and Dido, as told in the 1st century BC by the Roman poet, Virgil. Like the villa, it dates to the mid-4th century. The Low Ham mosaic is unique in Roman Britain in providing a narrative story in five panels: Aeneas sailing to Carthage, Aeneas meeting Dido, the couple out hunting, the couple embrace and Dido left alone after Aeneas' departure. It is the earliest piece of narrative art in the country. It was lifted in 1953 and is now on display in the Museum of Somerset. The site has been placed on the Heritage at Risk Register due to the risks from extensive animal burrowing.	1006192	Low Ham Roman Villa More images	
Lower Woolston medieval settlement	North Cadbury	Earthworks	Middle Ages	ST 65578 27411; 51°02′42″N 2°29′33″W	Earthworks show the site of houses and water management features. The site is mentioned in documents from the 14th century.	1018150	Upload Photo	
Maperton medieval settlement	Maperton	Earthworks	Middle Ages	ST 67461 26354; 51°02′08″N 2°27′55″W	Earthworks show the site of a village, with a village pond, and ridge and furrow agriculture.	1018151	Upload Photo	
Marston Magna moated site and associated earthworks	Marston Magna	Earthworks	Middle Ages	ST 59489 22189; 50°59′52″N 2°34′43″W	Earthworks show the site of a moated building, ridge and furrow agriculture and a fishpond.	1008250	Marston Magna moated site and associated earthworks	
Medieval bridge 100 m south west of Wyke House	Wyke Champflower	Bridge	15th century	ST 65706 34046; 51°06′17″N 2°29′28″W	A 15th-century stone bridge over the River Brue. The bridge, which is 13 metres (43 ft) long, has two arches.	1020496	Upload Photo	
Medieval secular college at Parsonage Farm	Stoke-sub-Hamdon	Priory	14th century	ST 47324 17440; 50°57′16″N 2°44′56″W	Stoke sub Hamdon Priory is a complex of buildings and ruins initially built in the 14th century for priests serving the chantry chapel of St Nicholas. During the 14th and early 15th centuries, the college fell into disrepair and was rebuilt around 1460. The only building remaining from the religious use is a great hall and attached dwelling, dating from the late 15th century. During the dissolution, the land passed into the laity, and was a tenanted farm until the middle of the 20th century.	1020665	Medieval secular college at Parsonage Farm More images	
Medieval settlement 190 m south west of Perry's Bridge	Babcary	Earthworks	Middle Ages	ST 57563 30182; 51°04′10″N 2°36′25″W	Earthworks show the site of houses, tracks and ponds.	1019031	Upload Photo	
Medieval settlement 300 m east of Knight House Farm	Cudworth	Earthworks	Middle Ages	ST 37536 10619; 50°53′30″N 2°53′22″W	Earthworks show the site of houses, tracks and farming.	1016412	Upload Photo	
Medieval settlement remains 100 m and 250 m north of Downhead Manor Farm	West Camel	Earthworks	Middle Ages	ST 56624 25590; 51°01′41″N 2°37′12″W	Earthworks show the site of houses, possibly including a manor house, tracks and a fish pond. The settlement existed before the Norman Conquest and was abandoned by the late 18th century.	1021260	Upload Photo	
Melbury Roman villa	Somerton	Roman villa	Romano-British	ST 47932 27514; 51°02′41″N 2°44′39″W	The site of a Roman villa with hypocaust tiles. Various artefacts have been uncovered at the site.	1002954	Upload Photo	
Moated site 800 m NNW of Pipplepen Farmhouse	North Perrott	Earthworks	Middle Ages	ST 47172 08399; 50°52′22″N 2°45′08″W	Earthworks of an 80-by-75-metre (262 by 246 ft) platform with the remains of buildings. The site with its surrounding moat is believed to be the medieval mansion home of the De Pipplepens.	1018923	Upload Photo	
Moated site, two fishponds and associated earthworks at Knight House Farm	Cudworth	Earthworks	Middle Ages	ST 37279 10784; 50°53′35″N 2°53′36″W	Earthworks of a 50-metre (160 ft) platform with the remains of buildings. The site with its surrounding moat is believed to be the medieval mansion home of Matthew de Esse.	1018635	Moated site, two fishponds and associated earthworks at Knight House Farm	
Montacute Castle a motte and bailey castle on St Michael's Hill	Montacute	Motte-and-bailey castle	11th century	ST 49355 16966; 50°56′59″N 2°43′20″W	Montacute Castle was built after the Norman Conquest of England in 1066 by Robert of Mortain. An 18th-century folly, St. Michael's Hill Tower, named after the castle chapel, stands on the site today, making use of part of the castle chapel's foundations. The site is owned by the National Trust and is open to the public.	1008466	Montacute Castle a motte and bailey castle on St Michael's Hill	
Motte-and-bailey castle in Cockroad Wood	Charlton Musgrove	Motte-and-bailey castle	11th century	ST 74618 32147; 51°05′14″N 2°37′42″W	Cockroad Wood Castle was a motte-and-bailey castle, probably built after the Norman Conquest of England in 1066. The castle is close to the contemporary Norman castles of Ballands and Castle Orchard, and may have been built a system of fortifications to control the surrounding area. By 1086 the surrounding land was held by Walter of Douai, although no documentary evidence of the castle remains. The castle was built with a motte and two baileys, running along a north–south ridge, with a possible entrance to the east. The motte today is 13.5 metres (44 ft) wide, up to 7.5 metres (25 ft) high and is surrounded by a 1.25-metre (4 ft 1 in) deep ditch. The two baileys were probably linked to the motte by wooden bridges.	1008256	Motte-and-bailey castle in Cockroad Wood	
Muchelney Abbey	Muchelney	Abbey	8th century	ST 42883 24732; 51°01′09″N 2°48′57″W	Muchelney Abbey is an English Heritage property. The site consists of ruined walls showing the layout of the abbey buildings constructed from the 8th to 16th and the remaining intact Abbott's House. It is next to the parish church in which some of the fabric of the abbey has been reused. It comprises the remains and foundations of a medieval Benedictine abbey, the site of an earlier Anglo-Saxon abbey, and an early Tudor house dating from the 16th century, formerly the lodgings of the resident Abbot, which is now a Grade I listed building.	1006230	Muchelney Abbey More images	
Northover House, late Roman cemetery	Ilchester	Earthworks with stone and lead coffins	Romano-British	ST 52165 22965; 51°00′15″N 2°40′59″W	Coffins made of stone and lead, dating from the late 4th century, have been found in the grounds of Northover House. A survey in the 1980s estimated here had been over 1500 burials. The site is on the Heritage at Risk Register due to scrub and tree growth.	1006128	Upload Photo	
Pen Pits quern quarries N of Combe Bottom	Penselwood	Earthworks	Iron Age, Romano-British and Middle Ages	ST 76615 32040; 51°05′14″N 2°20′07″W	A series of bowl shaped pits which were used as stone quarries during the Iron Age, Romano-British and Middle Ages.	1004687	Upload Photo	
Pill Bridge	Ilchester	Packhorse bridge	17th century	ST 50005 23392; 51°00′28″N 2°42′50″W	A 17th-century stone packhorse bridge over the River Yeo, which replaced an earlier 13th-century bridge at the same site.	1006214	Pill Bridge	
Pottery kiln S of Whitney Bottom	Donyatt	Kiln	14th to 17th century	ST 32332 13634; 50°55′06″N 2°57′50″W	The remains of pottery kilns built in the 17th and 18th centuries. They were excavated in the 1960s and 1970s.	1002961	Upload Photo	
Promontory fort on Barrow Hill	Milborne Port	Hillfort	Iron Age	ST 67116 20755; 50°59′07″N 2°28′11″W	A bank and ditch system surrounding the site of an Iron Age hillfort on Barrow Hill.	1016738	Upload Photo	
Prospect tower 230 m south of King's School	Bruton	Dovecote	15th or 16th century	ST 68384 34418; 51°06′30″N 2°27′11″W	Bruton Dovecote was built in the 16th century. It was at one time used as a house, possibly as a watchtower and as a dovecote. The building was once within the deerpark of Bruton Abbey and was adapted by the monks from a gabled Tudor tower. The conversion to be a dovecote took place around 1780. The square tower was built of local stone with Doulting stone dressings. Although it is now a roofless ruin and some of the windows have been blocked up, it previously had a chimney and the fireplace can still be seen.	1019895	Prospect tower 230 m south of King's School More images	
Roman house S of Fair View House	Curry Rivel	Roman villa	Romano-British	ST 39681 24840; 51°01′11″N 2°51′41″W	Marks have been identified within a large arable field which may represent the foundations of a Roman villa.	1006185	Upload Photo	
Roman house W of vicarage	Drayton	Roman villa	Romano-British	ST 40072 24797; 51°01′10″N 2°51′21″W	Crop marks may represent the site of a Roman building.	1006184	Upload Photo	
Romano-British settlement immediately south west of Camel Hill Farm	Queen Camel	Earthworks	Romano-British	ST 58473 25535; 51°01′40″N 2°35′37″W	The site of a Roman settlement occupied in the 2nd to 4th centuries. Stone foundations of at least three buildings have been identified.	1020936	Upload Photo	
Roman villa at Lufton	Brympton	Roman villa	Romano-British	ST 51552 17825; 50°57′28″N 2°41′28″W	The site of a Roman villa excavated after the discovery of mosaics including one depicting people dressed in Roman dress and a hunting scene.	1006159	Upload Photo	
Roman villa N of Dunnock's Lane	East Coker	Roman villa	Romano-British	ST 54604 13755; 50°55′17″N 2°38′50″W	Excavations from the 1940s to 1960s showed the remains of a Roman corridor villa with an extensive bath block. Many of the rooms had mosaic floors and walls.	1003029	Upload Photo	
Roman villa N of Stowey Hill	Pitney	Roman villa	Romano-British	ST 45085 30080; 51°04′03″N 2°47′06″W	A Roman villa excavated in the 19th century, with baths, hypocausts and mosaics. Nearby is a mausoleum which included coins from Vespasian and the Nerva–Antonine dynasty.	1006183	Upload Photo	
Roman villa N of Whitestaunton	Whitestaunton	Roman villa	Romano-British	ST 28022 10589; 50°53′25″N 3°01′29″W	Excavations in the 19th century uncovered the site of a Roman villa in the grounds of Whitestaunton Manor. Further work in 2003 by the Time Team identified a bath house.	1006124	Upload Photo	
Somerton Market Cross	Somerton	Market cross	14th century	ST 49046 28551; 51°03′14″N 2°43′42″W	Market crosses have stood in the square at Somerton since before 1390; the present Butter Cross, an octagonal roofed market cross, was rebuilt in 1673. It has a slate roof supported by eight arches.	1016740	Somerton Market Cross	
The Round House	Castle Cary	Village lock-up	1779	ST 64051 32385; 51°05′23″N 2°30′53″W	A small circular stone building, which served as the village lock-up.	1016741	The Round House More images	
Site of a Cluniac priory immediately east of Abbey Farm	Montacute	Priory	11th century	ST 49683 16805; 50°56′54″N 2°43′02″W	Montacute Priory was a Cluniac priory of the Benedictine order founded between 1078 and 1102 by William, Count of Mortain. All that remains is the Abbey Farmhouse which incorporates the gateway of Montacute Priory, although the sites of an associated fishpond and dovecote have been excavated.	1019898	Upload Photo	
The Hanging Chapel and a medieval gateway at The Hill	Langport	Chapel	Middle Ages	ST 42333 26746; 51°02′11″N 2°49′30″W	The Hanging Chapel (more formally known as the Chantry Chapel of the Blessed Virgin Mary) is a 13th-century archway, bearing a Perpendicular building known as the hanging chapel. Excavation in the 1990s showed that the gateway and chapel had been built on the site of a Saxon bank around the town. The archway is all that remains of the east gate of the defended town. The archway which goes over the former main road takes the form of a pointed barrel vault.	1019290	The Hanging Chapel and a medieval gateway at The Hill More images	
The Packhorse Bridge 100 m north west of the Church of St Mary	Bruton	Packhorse bridge	15th century	ST 68358 34819; 51°06′43″N 2°27′18″W	Bow Bridge is a 15th-century Packhorse bridge over the River Brue. The bridge may have been built as a link between the former Bruton Abbey, and its Court House in the High Street. On the parapet on the western side of the bridge the remains of a carved shield can still be seen. The bridge was restored after floods on 12 July 1982.	1019894	The Packhorse Bridge 100 m north west of the Church of St Mary More images	
Two bowl barrows 300 m north west of Northay Farm	Whitestaunton	Bowl barrow	Bronze Age	ST 28098 11494; 50°53′54″N 3°01′26″W	A pair of bowl barrows on the Blackdown Hills. The northernmost barrow of the pair was excavated in 1876 which revealed a pottery urn of ashes and other human remains along with a bronze dagger blade.	1016413	Upload Photo	
Village cross	Horsington	Cross	Middle Ages	ST 70307 23841; 51°00′48″N 2°25′29″W	A medieval hamstone cross with an octagonal shaft on a stepped circular base.	1017016	Village cross	
Village cross	Hinton St George	Cross	Middle Ages	ST 41973 12624; 50°54′37″N 2°49′36″W	is a 2.5-metre (8 ft 2 in) high cross with a tapering octagonal shaft on stepped octagonal base.	1018634	Village cross	
Wadeford Roman villa	Combe St Nicholas	Roman villa	Romano-British	ST 30881 10521; 50°53′24″N 2°59′03″W	The site of a Roman villa which was excavated in the 19th century. Finds included coins from the 3rd century and wall mosaics. A Bronze Age spearhead from the site is in the Museum of Somerset.	1006187	Wadeford Roman villa More images	
West Mudford medieval settlement, 500 m south west of West Mudford Farm	Mudford	Earthworks	Middle Ages	ST 56465 20064; 50°58′42″N 2°37′17″W	Earthworks including houses and ponds from a settlement occupied in the 13th and 14th centuries. It is surrounded by a medieval field system.	1018138	Upload Photo	

== See also ==
- Scheduled Monuments in Somerset
- Grade I listed buildings in South Somerset
- Grade II* listed buildings in South Somerset
