= List of castles in Somerset =

Castles in Somerset

This is a list of castles in the ceremonial county of Somerset, England. The first castles - private fortified residences of a lord or noble - were built in Somerset following the Norman Conquest of England, although earlier fortified structures, such as burhs or hill forts, of which there are many in Somerset were sometimes historically described as castles. In the aftermath of his victory at the Battle of Hastings in 1066, William the Conqueror entrusted the conquest of the south-west of England to his half-brother Robert of Mortain. Anticipating stiff resistance, Robert marched west into Somerset, supported by forces under Walter of Douai, who entered from the north; a third force, under the command of William de Moyon, probably landed by sea along the Somerset coast. These lords defended the coastline and the north and east of the county with a range of castles, including Neroche, Montacute and Dunster. The castles were carefully positioned to control key settlements, rivers and roads, and were constructed from timber, using either motte-and-bailey or ringwork designs. Rebellions soon broke out across the south-west, and Montacute was placed under siege in 1069. By the turn of the 12th century, however, many of the smaller castles built in the post-conquest years had already been abandoned.

During the civil war years of the Anarchy in the mid-12th century, during which the rival Anglo-Norman factions of King Stephen and the Empress Matilda vied for power, new motte-and-bailey castles such as Bury and probably Fenny, were erected to provide additional defences, some castles like Neroche that had previously been in decline were temporarily pressed back into service, and a number, including Cary and Richmont saw sieges. Between the 12th and 14th centuries many Somerset castles, such as Cary, Fenny, Montacute fell out of use. In the 14th century, the castles being built in Somerset, such as Nunney and Farleigh Hungerford, were impressive dwellings, but built more for show than for military defence. These typically took an enclosure style with quadrangular sides, corner towers and courtyards, as at Newton St Loe. Gatehouses became popular features in the 15th century, often used as fashionable residences, such as at Dunster Castle.

In 1642, civil war broke out in England between the Royalist supporters of Charles I and the supporters of Parliament. Somerset was predominantly Royalist in sympathy, and several castles were returned to military service during the conflict, including Taunton and Dunster. After the war, Parliament ordered various castles in the region to be deliberately damaged - slighted - including Bridgwater, Dunster and Taunton. Architectural fashions changed in England, and by the 18th century some castles had been redeveloped as grand houses, their grounds reused to hold new mansions, as at Storgursey, while the ruins of Newton St Loes were used as romantic curiosities. As the century progressed, sites such as Bridgwater were redeveloped altogether and the remains of the castles destroyed. In the late 19th century and early 20th century. Somerset's castles were protected by a variety of legislation, eventually as scheduled monuments and listed buildings. Castles under state control through the Ministry of Works were transferred to the heritage agency English Heritage in 1983, who now run Nunney, and Farleigh Hungerford Castles, and the National Trust acquired Dunster in 1976. Other castles have found alternative uses, such as Storgursey, renovated by the Landmark Trust between 1981 and 1982 for use as a holiday property.

== Castles ==
List of castles in Somerset
Site Name Alternative name(s)	Constructed	Scheduling Number	Listed building grade	Plan	Image	Location or parish	Description
Ballands Castle	After 1066	202580	–	–	–	Penselwood; 51.0782°N 2.3533°W	A motte and bailey castle, probably built after the Norman conquest of England in 1066. The castle sits close to the contemporary Norman castles of Cockroad Wood and Castle Orchard, and may have been built as part of a system of fortifications to control the surrounding area. The motte of the castle is now around 5 m high, and up to 9 m wide. The bailey lies to the south, and both the motte and the bailey are surrounded by ditches.
Bishop's Palace	c. 1210	–	I	–		Wells; 51.2093°N 2.6426°W	The building was begun around 1210 by Bishop Jocelin of Wells but principally dates from 1230. It was restored, divided and the upper storey added by Benjamin Ferrey between 1846 and 1854. The north wing (now the Bishop's residence) was added in the 15th century by Bishop Beckington, with further modifications in the 18th century, and in 1810 by Bishop Beadon.
Bridgwater Castle	1202	190958	II*	–		Bridgwater; 51.1357°N 2.9983°W	Bridgwater Castle was a substantial structure built in Old Red Sandstone, covering a site of 8 or 9 acres (32,000 to 36,000 m^{2}). A tidal moat, up to 65 feet (20 m) wide in places, flowed about along the current streets of Fore Street and Castle Moat, and between Northgate and Chandos Street. The moat was filled from Durleigh brook, a tributary of the River Parrett.
Bury Castle	Late 1130s	36765	–		–	Brompton Regis; 51.0321°N 3.5152°W	During the Anarchy between the supporters of King Stephen and the Empress Matilda, a motte and bailey castle was built on the site of an earlier Iron Age hillfort, probably by William de Say. The motte measures 23 metres (75 ft) and was placed on the southern tip of the promontory, with the bailey beyond around 60 metres (197 ft) across.
Cary Castle		200127	–	–		Castle Cary; 51.0880°N 2.5140°W	Motte and bailey castle was built either by Walter of Douai or by his son Robert. Besieged by King Stephen during The Anarchy By 1468 the castle had been abandoned. Around that time a manor house was built on or adjacent to the site of the castle, possibly by Baron Zouche. It was largely demolished at the end of the 18th century.
Castle Batch	–	192666	–	–		Weston-super-Mare; 51.3688°N 2.9182°W	Castle Batch was a motte constructed by the Normans in the 11th or 12th century. It was built on a ridge above the surrounding area, with a mound that is now 3 metres (9.8 ft) high and 42 metres (138 ft) across, surrounded by a ditch up to 10 metres (33 ft) wide. A possible bailey has been identified alongside the motte.
Castle Neroche	11th century	190295	–			Curland; 50.9365°N 3.0362°W	Motte-and-bailey castle on the site of an earlier hill fort, probably built by Robert, Count of Mortain. Archaeological evidence suggests it was built in several stages during the first a rampart enclosing 7.5 acres (3.0 ha) was built. Soon after the Norman Conquest a smaller inner ringwork was constructed. The site was later converted into a motte and bailey, with a corner of the 20 feet (6.1 m) high motte serving as a barbican.
Cockroad Wood Castle	After 1066	202650	–	–		Charlton Musgrove; 51.0881°N 2.3633°W	A motte and bailey castle, probably built after the Norman conquest of England in 1066. The castle sits close to the contemporary Norman castles of Ballands and Castle Orchard, and may have been built a system of fortifications to control the surrounding area. The castle was built with a motte and two baileys, running along a north–south ridge, with a possible entrance to the east. The motte today is 13.5 wide, up to 7.5 m high and is surrounded by a 1.25 m deep ditch. The two baileys were probably linked to the motte by wooden bridges.
Crewkerne Castle Castle Hill Croft Castle Crow Castle	Norman motte or 13th century manor house	–	–	–		Crewkerne; 50.89287°N 2.8246°W	Possibly a Norman motte and bailey castle on a 450 feet (140 m) high outcrop that since at least 1839 has been termed a castle site. Archaeological and geophysical research has found a ditch around the hilltop, with a masonry square within it, while fragments of 12th century pottery have been found on the site. One theory is that this is a Norman motte; another that it is a 13th-century manor house; alternatively it may be simply have been a local folly.
Culverhay Castle Englishcombe Castle	Late 11th century to the early 13th century	204528	–	–		Englishcombe; 51.3658°N 2.4037°W	A ringwork design with a ditch and bank, up to 5 feet (1.5 m) deep. During the first half of the 13th century a stone circular keep and low curtain wall was built at the castle, along with one or two other stone buildings within the ringwork. A medieval deer park may have been attached to the castle.
Down End Castle Downend Castle Chisley Mount Chidley Mount	–	192333	–	–	–	Down End, Dunball, Puriton; 51.1674°N 2.9921°W	Probably a motte-and-bailey castle, although there has been some debate about its origin and purpose. The motte has two baileys to the north. The inner bailey has one bank and the outer one a double bank. Norman and later pottery and iron objects were found during excavations in 1908. The mound measures 30 metres (98 ft) across the top.
Dunster Castle	–	36863	I			Dunster; 51.1814°N 3.4444°W	The historical home of the Luttrell family. A motte-and-bailey castle fortified since Saxon times. The castle was able to withstand a siege by the forces of King Stephen in 1138. In the 17th century the building was expanded into a fortified manor house but was still able to resist Royalist forces in the English Civil War. It was further modified during the 18th and 19th centuries. In the 20th century it was sold to the nation and is now owned and operated by the National Trust as a tourist attraction.
Farleigh Hungerford Castle Farleigh Castle Farley Castle	c. 1370	207732	I			Farleigh Hungerford; 51.3172°N 2.2847°W	Built in the 14th century, the castle was originally a manor house for the Montfort family having been granted to them by William Rufus. Originally a manor house overlooking the River Frome it was fortified and developed over hundreds of years with a barbican, and polygonal outer court. It played a role in the English Civil War before falling into ruin.
Fenny Castle		197243	–	–		Wookey; 51.1894°N 2.7053°W	The remains of a motte and bailey castle sited on a natural hillock of Lias approximately 20 metres (66 ft) above the surrounding flat land on the edge of the Somerset Levels. Little remains of the stonework, and there is evidence of extensive quarrying. The mound is now covered in grass and scrub with a few trees.
Hales Castle	–	202864	–			Selwood; 51.1971°N 2.2910°W	A circular ringwork 120 feet (37 m) in diameter, on the northern slope of Roddenbury Hill, comprising bank and outer ditch and an unfinished bailey.
Locking Castle	–	–	–	–	–	Locking; 51.3434°N 2.9147°W	A motte and bailey on Carberry Hill. The origin of the castle is unclear. It may have been part of the manor of Kewstoke or alternatively Hutton. The two manors were combined and given by Henry I to Geoffrey de Dun. In 1214 Locking was given to Woodspring Priory and would have ceased to have military significance.
Montacute Castle	After 1066	193150	–			Montacute (St Michael's Hill); 50.9497°N 2.7224°W	Montacute Castle was built after the Norman Conquest of England in 1066 by Robert of Mortain. The natural features of the hill were used to form an oval-shaped motte and an inner bailey, surrounded by an outer bailey beyond. A park for hunting was established alongside the castle and the village. The castle was unsuccessfully besieged in 1068 during a major Anglo-Saxon revolt against Norman rule, but the rebels were defeated by Geoffrey de Montbray, the Bishop of Coutances.
Newton St Loe Castle	12th century	–	I	–		Newton St Loe; 51.3728°N 2.4397°W	Newton St Loe Castle was originally built as a fortified manor house, probably in the 12th century, surrounded by Newton Park, then a medieval deer park. At the start of the 14th century, a keep was built on the site. In the 19th century the castle and the surrounding park were heavily landscaped to produce the current country house and gardens; only the renovated keep and the gatehouse survive intact, although a nearby mound marks one of the corner towers of the 14th-century castle. Today the site is leased by Bath Spa University.
Nunney Castle	14th century	202784	–			Nunney; 51.2103°N 2.3786°W	Built in the late 14th century by Sir John Delamare on the profits of his involvement in the Hundred Years War, the moated castle's architectural style, possibly influenced by the design of French castles. Remodelled during the late 16th century, Nunney Castle was damaged during the English Civil War and is now ruined. English Heritage maintain the site as a tourist attraction. The architectural historian Nikolaus Pevsner has described Nunney as "aesthetically the most impressive castle in Somerset."
Richmont Castle	After 1066	197292	–	–		East Harptree; 51.2991°N 2.6283°W	Built probably soon after the Norman conquest of England in 1066, possibly making use of an existing Iron Age fortification. Later versions of the castle involved the creation of an inner bailey within the first, and a circular keep on the highest point on the spur. During the 12th century, Richmont Castle was involved in the civil war known as the Anarchy. The castle was ruined and abandoned by the 1540s, with the stone being reused to build local houses. The site was mined extensively between the 17th and 19th centuries for lead and calamine, used at the foundries at Bristol.
Stogursey Castle	Late 11th or early 12th century	–	II*	–		Stogursey; 51.1756°N 3.1417°W	Stogursey Castle was built by the family of the De Courcys. The castle was a motte-and-bailey design with a 60 metres (200 ft) wide, 2 metres (6.6 ft) tall motte and two bailey enclosures, surrounded by a water-filled moat, fed from the nearby Stogursey Brook. The castle was controlled by King John of England during the First Barons' War, and was ordered destroyed in 1215, but survived; John's lieutenant Falkes de Breauté took control of the castle, and after his death a second order to destroy the property was given in 1228, again apparently ignored. The castle was extended in stone in 1300 by the Fitzpayne family, but was destroyed in the 1450s by the Yorkist faction during the War of the Roses. A house was built within the castle grounds in the 17th century and was restored in the 1870s, but by the late 20th century had itself become ruined.
Stowey Castle	11th century	189462	–			Nether Stowey; 51.1485°N 3.1625°W	A Norman motte-and-bailey castle, sited on a small isolated knoll of Leighland Slates of the Devonian series, about 390 feet (119 m) high. It consisted of a square keep, (which may have been stone, or a wooden superstructure on stone foundations) and its defences, and an outer and an inner bailey. The mount is 29 feet (9 m) above the 6 feet (2 m) wide ditch, which itself is 7 feet (2 m) deep. The motte has a flat top with two large and two small mounds as the edge. These may be sites of towers. The central area is occupied by approximately square foundations, 33 feet (10 m) by 33 feet (10 m) with internal divisions. The castle was destroyed in the 15th century, which may have been as a penalty for the local Lord Audley's involvement in the Second Cornish Uprising of 1497 led by Perkin Warbeck. Some of the stone was used in the building of Stowey Court in the village.
Taunton Castle	1107-1129	–	I	–		Taunton; 51.0153°N 3.1138°W	It has origins in the Anglo Saxon period and was later the site of a priory. Between 1107 and 1129 William Giffard the Chancellor of King Henry I, converted the bishop's hall into a castle. It was his successor, Henry of Blois, who transformed the manor-house here into a mighty castle in 1138, during the Civil War that raged during the reign of his brother, King Stephen. Taunton Castle had fallen into ruin by 1600 but it was repaired during the Civil War. The current heavily reconstructed buildings are the inner ward, which now houses the county museum, and the Michelin Guide starred Castle Hotel on the site of one of the previous gate houses.
Wimble Toot	Bronze Age, or between 1067 and 1069	1015279	–	–		Babcary; 51.0501°N 2.6284°W	Wimble Toot is generally interpreted as a typical Bronze Age barrow. An alternative interpretation is that it was possibly a motte built between 1067 and 1069. Today the site forms a circular earthwork, 27.47 m across and 2.74 m high, with a ditch on the north-west and south-east sides, on the top of a ridge that overlooks a brook that runs into the River Cary, and the old Roman road of the Fosse Way.

== See also ==
- Castles in Great Britain and Ireland
- List of castles in England
- List of hill forts and ancient settlements in Somerset

== Bibliography ==
- Adkins, Lesley and Roy (1992). A field Guide to Somerset Archeology. Stanbridge: Dovecote press. ISBN 0-946159-94-7.
- Brown, G. (2008) Richmont Castle, East Harptree: An Analytical Earthwork Survey, English Heritage Research Department Report No. 73. London: English Heritage.
- Creighton, Oliver Hamilton (2005). Castles and Landscapes: Power, Community and Fortification in Medieval England. London: Equinox. ISBN 978-1-904768-67-8.
- Dunning, Robert (1995). Somerset Castles. Tiverton: Somerset Books. ISBN 978-0-86183-278-1.
- Dunning, Robert (2001). Somerset Monasteries. Stroud: Tempus. ISBN 0-7524-1941-2.
- Emery, Anthony. (2006) Greater Medieval Houses of England and Wales, 1300–1500: Southern England. Cambridge: Cambridge University Press. ISBN 978-0-521-58132-5.
- Friar, Stephen (2003). The Sutton Companion to Castles. Stroud: Sutton Publishing. ISBN 978-0-7509-3994-2.
- Grimsditch, Brian; Nevell, Mike & Redhead, Norman (September 2007). "Buckton Castle: An Archaeological Evaluation of a Medieval Ringwork – an Interim Report". University of Manchester Archaeological Unit.
- Landmark Trust. (2006) The Landmark Trust Handbook. Maidenhead, UK: The Landmark Trust. ISBN 978-0-9533124-5-0.
- Liddiard, Robert. (2005) Castles in Context: Power, Symbolism and Landscape, 1066 to 1500. Macclesfield, UK: Windgather Press. ISBN 0-9545575-2-2.
- Mackenzie, J.D. (1896) Castles of England. New York: Macmillan.
- Pettifer, Adrian. (2002) English Castles: a Guide by Counties. Woodbridge, UK: Boydell Press. ISBN 978-0-85115-782-5.
- Pevsner, Nikolaus. (1958) North Somerset and Bristol. London: Penguin Books. OCLC 459446734.
- Prior, Stuart. (2006) The Norman Art of War: a Few Well-Positioned Castles. Stroud, UK: Tempus. ISBN 0-7524-3651-1.
- Rigold, Stuart. (1975) Nunney Castle: Somerset. London: HMSO. ISBN 0-11-670005-X.
- Rowley, Trevor (1997). Norman England. Batsford and English Heritage. ISBN 0-7134-8060-2.
- Waite, Vincent (1964). Portrait of the Quantocks. London: Robert Hale. ISBN 0-7091-1158-4.
- Youngs, Susan M. and John Clark. (1981) "Medieval Britain in 1980," Medieval Archaeology 25,
