= John Adams (cartographer) =

English cartographer (died 1690)

- Born: 1643; Shropshire
- Died: 1690 (Note: Most modern sources conflate the cartographer with an instrument maker of the same name, giving an erroneous death date of 1738.); Ireland
- Education: Shrewsbury School; Inner Temple
- Occupations: cartographer, barrister
- Notable work: Index Villaris
- Spouse: Jane Wrottesley

John Adams (c.1643–1690) was an English cartographer responsible for an elaborate map of England and Wales (1677) and an exceptionally large gazetteer known as his Index Villaris (1680). (Note: The suggestion that Adams was "Joannes Adamus Transylvanus", the author of a Latin poem describing the city of London, has been shown to be incorrect.)

== Early life and education ==
John Adams was born in Shropshire and in 1653 followed his four older brothers in attending Shrewsbury School. His eldest brother, William, was admitted to Gray’s Inn in 1655 but never progressed to the bar, and settled back in Shropshire where he would later assist John as a surveyor; another brother, Robert, was rector of Shrawardine from 1666 until 1710. (Note: In 1683 William produced a map showing ways leading from Robert's parish.) Their parents, William and Ann, also had four daughters. Following his marriage in about 1665, John became embroiled in litigation with his brother-in-law concerning his wife’s dowry, an experience of the law which may ultimately have led to his admission to the Inner Temple in 1672, where he was called to the bar in 1680.

== Map of England and Wales, 1677 ==
Map of England & Wales by John Adams (1677), updated by Philip Lea (1692)

Map of England & Wales by John Adams (1679)

In July 1677 it was announced in the London Gazette that John Adams "of the Inner-Temple" had produced "A New Large Map of England full six foot square", enabling merchants and armchair travellers for the first time to see at a glance the "computed and measured miles" between market towns and other significant places. Thomas Palmer had produced a somewhat sketchy roadmap of England and Wales in 1668, but this was based on surveys undertaken by Christopher Saxton (in the 1570s) and John Norden, and errors had accrued with the publication of each successive "new" map, including those of John Speed. Also, as Adams observed, "The Space of One hundred years, and the late Civil War hath much altered the face of the Kingdom; many Castles and Ancient Seats have been demolished, and several considerable Houses since erected, Market Towns disused, and others new made". Following an extensive survey, John Ogilby published in 1675 the first detailed strip-maps showing the country's principal roads, (Note: See Ogilby's Britannia (Atlas.4.67.6) in Cambridge Digital Library) but Adams seems to have perceived a need for a more comprehensive and spatially-representative map. Having witnessed in London the publication of Ogilby's maps, Adams engaged one of Ogilby's surveyors, Gregory King, to engrave his 1677 map, which was printed over twelve separate sheets. Two years later, King was again engaged to engrave a smaller version of the map (spread over just two 'Imperial' sheets), to which were added "the Rivers and an Alphabetical Table of all the Cities and Market-Towns, with Letters referring to the Map, the Distance of every Town from London, and their several Latitudes and Longitudes".

== Index Villaris ==
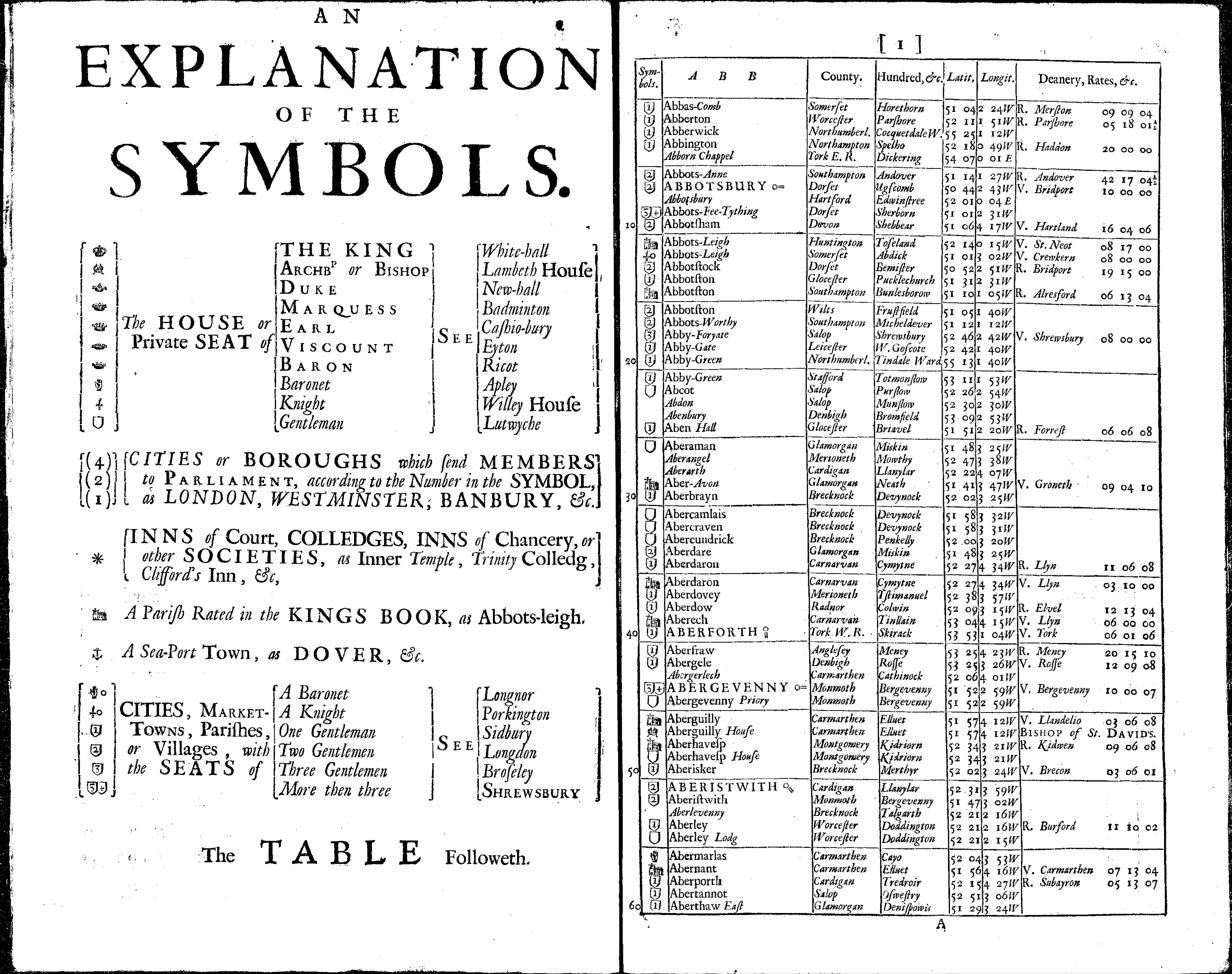
Index Villaris: page 1 and "Explanation of the Symbols"

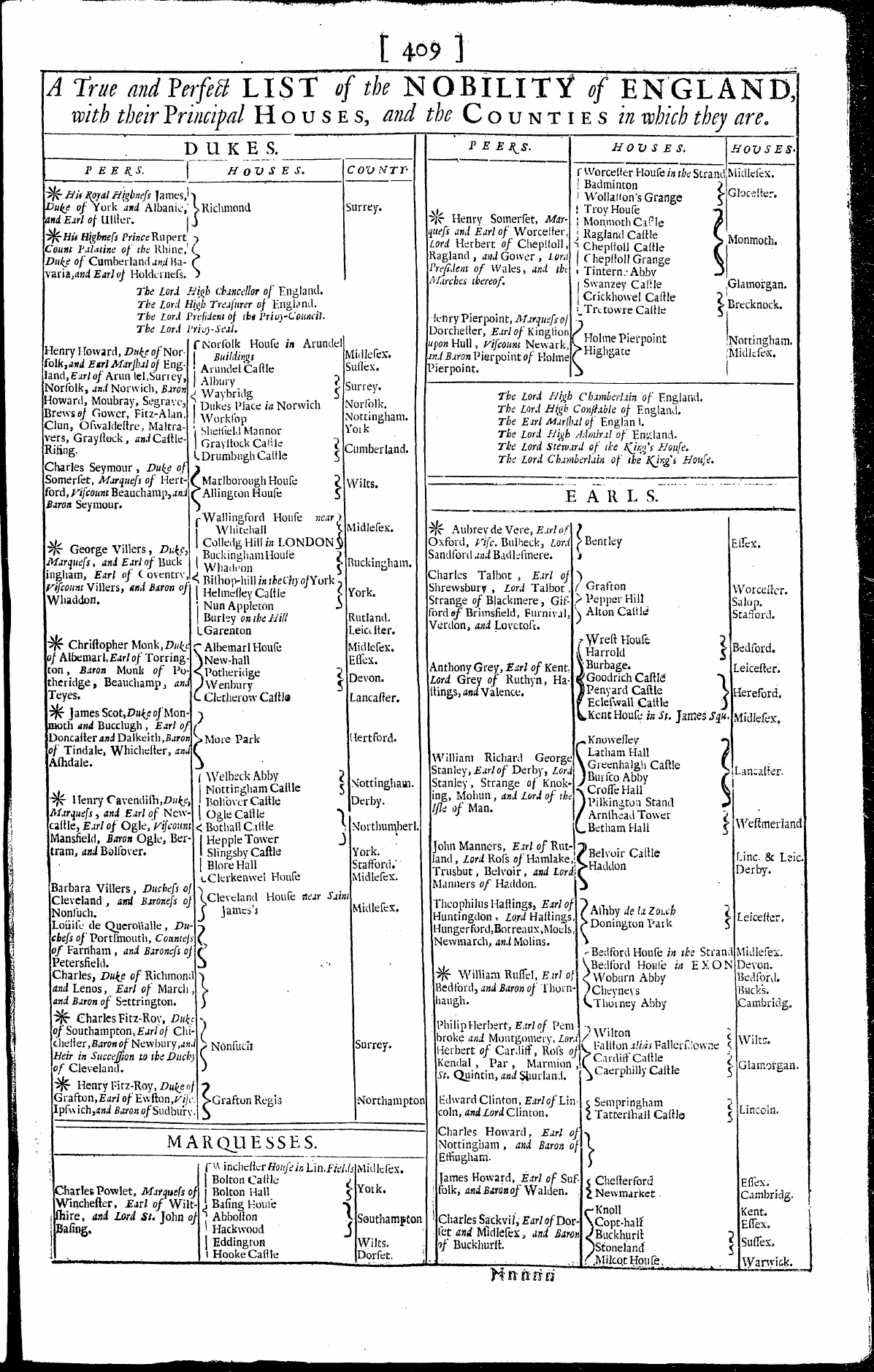
Index Villaris: "List of the Nobility of England"

Aware that he had needed to omit a great many places shown on Saxton's and Norden's county maps, Adams began to compile a list of them, and engaged King to supplement this list by extracting place-names from the recently collected records of the Hearth Tax surveyors. The resulting Index Villaris, or an Alphabetical Table of all Cities, Market-towns, Parishes, Villages, Private Seats in England and Wales, published in 1680, contains no fewer than 24,000 entries detailing key information about each place; the publication included a copy of the reduced 1679 map. In the Preface, Adams described how, before coming to London, he had tabulated the distances between market towns in north Wales in order to calculate the potential market for fish landed at Aberdovey; on his arrival in London and recognising the economic value of such distance tables he had extended them across the whole of England and Wales. The inclusion of geographical coordinates for every place, calculated by triangulating the distances between places reported by his correspondents and between points indicated on earlier maps (taking as a basis the coordinates of county towns published by Speed), is testament to Adams' vision and tenacity. (Note: A fuller list of resources at Adams's disposal is discussed by William Ravenhill.) Index Villaris was so successful that it was reprinted in 1690 and again in 1700, (Note: These later editions bear different subtitles from the first edition, "Or a Geographical Table..." and "or an exact register, alphabetically digested..." respectively. The appendices were updated, but the table of place-names was reprinted from the original plates without correction or other alteration.) and numerous copies remain in the local collections of the National Trust.

== Enlarged map of England and Wales ==
Within months of being called to the bar in November 1680, and having decided that his triangulation calculations were inadequately exact, Adams was soliciting subscriptions for an "Actual Survey of all the Counties in England and Wales", which was to be done "in a more particular manner than has ever hitherto been attempted". He was encouraged by Robert Hooke, Isaac Newton, Nehemiah Grew, John Flamsteed, and other members of the Royal Society: in January 1681 Christopher Wren "Acquainted the society wth the vndertaking of Mr. Iohn Adams to suruey all england by the measuring taking of angles and also of taking the Latitudes of Places. and in order to doe this of running 3 seuerall meridians cleer through england. that mr. newton of Cambridge had promised to assist him". (Note: This and other references to Adams's survey can be found in the "Hooke Folio Online".) Charles II proclaimed that Adams was to be helped to "make his observations from all the eminent high lands, hills and steeples for placing the cities, market towns, parishes, villages and private seats in their true positions". By the end of 1681, Adams had set out a baseline about 12 miles long, between Dundon Beacon and the spire of Bridgwater church, the all-important accuracy of distance measurement being facilitated by the flatness of ground between these points. Starting from here he noted the angles between observable points (including Glastonbury Tor), and had already covered 7,000 miles into Devon and Cornwall and to "the top zone of the highest hills in Wales"; he asked Hooke to procure two or three telescopes for him, "7 or 8 foot long". In 1682 Adams was in Lancashire (where he was admitted as a "foreign burgess" in Preston), (Note: Adams Joh'es de Inner Temple Ar' Jur'.) and through his surviving correspondence with Sir Daniel Fleming we learn that by the end of September 1683 he had hoped to have "one or more Counties Compleated". A "Specimen" map of Shropshire at the British Library, resembling in form the 1677 map and again engraved by King, may date from this time, and includes some additional post roads, place-names, and adjusted mileages.

By April 1685 Adams had enlisted the financial backing of several hundred subscribers and "made considerable progress", but needed yet more funds, to which end James II proclaimed his support for "the speedy completing of so good and useful a work". Following a bout of illness, in late April 1687 Adams asked to be excused from his duties at the Inner Temple and gave up his rooms there, perhaps to devote all of his energies to his survey. Evidently struggling to complete his survey and worried by ill-health, in a letter to Archbishop Sancroft in June 1688 Adams wrote that "if I live I resolve ... to do the utmost that lyes in my power for the satisfaction of yor Lordship and the rest of my Encouragers".

== Marriage and children ==
Adams married Jane Wrottesley (d. bef. 15 Aug 1684), daughter of Sir Walter Wrottesley of Wrottesley, first baronet (d.1659). Their children were:

- Wrottesley Adams (bap. 1666 – d. 1685)
- Thomas Adams (bap. 1669)
- Mary Adams (bap. 1671)
- William Adams (bap. 1672 – d. 1714). Rector of Staunton-upon-Wye, Herefordshire, from 26 Jul 1712; a highly esteemed preacher; published an edition of Cornelius Nepos, 1697; fifteen of his sermons before the University of Oxford were published by Henry Sacheverell in 1716.
- John Adams (bap. 1674)
- Susanna Adams

William, John, and Susanna were all still living in 1687.

== Death and legacy ==
Gregory King recorded that Adams died in 1690 "a Souldier in Ireland", (Note: For context see Battle of the Boyne: Adams' political allegiances are not known, but no likely commission for William III's forces has been identified.) "before he had perfected any thing" of his survey, but William Gilpin suggested in 1694 that "Mr Adams' papers (wch I believ may be retrieved) would improve many of ye Maps". Indeed, it seems quite possible that Adams' papers had already been acquired by Robert Morden, an engraver who, like King, had been an agent for the sale of Adams's original map in 1677. In 1695, without commissioning or undertaking any surveying work himself, Morden published a complete set of English county maps, which ongoing research may show to have benefitted from Adams' work: curiously, his Shropshire map is especially highly detailed.

== Bibliography ==
Adams, John. Index Villaris, or, an Alphabetical Table of All the Cities, Market-Towns, Parishes, Villages, and Private Seats in England and Wales. Printed by A. Godbid and J. Playford for the Author, 1680.
