= Ham Hill =

Ham Hill could refer to:

- Ham Hill, Somerset SSSI, Country Park and Local landmark to Yeovil
  - Ham Hill Hillfort
- Ham Hill SSSI, Wiltshire

There is also a lesser known area to the south of Snodland, Kent that is called Ham Hill. It has always played 'second fiddle' to the larger town of Snodland, which has absorbed Ham Hill into itself, but still keeps the name as a reference.
