= Church of St Michael and All Angels, Penselwood =

Church in Somerset, England

Church of St Michael and All Angels
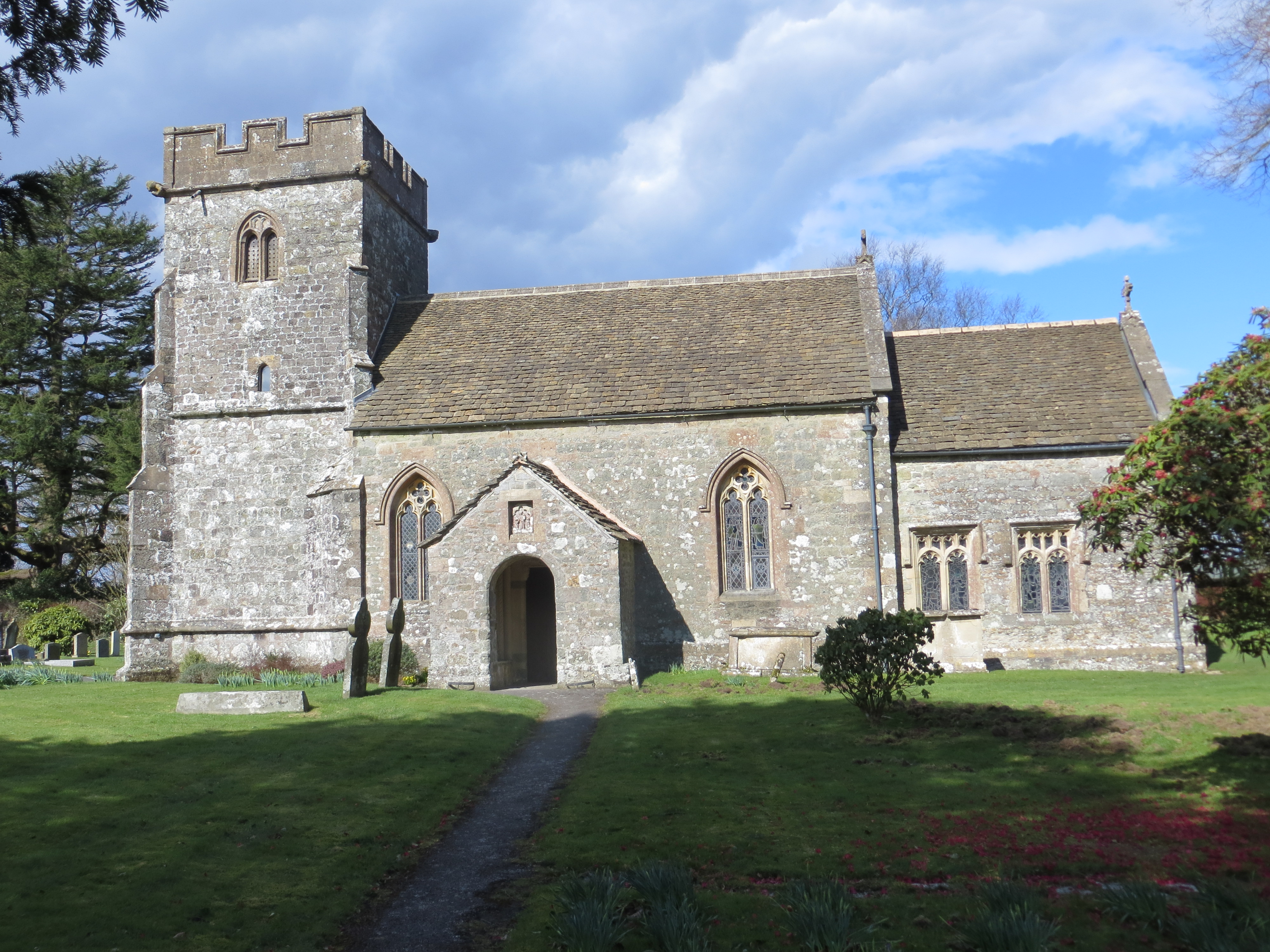

- Location within Somerset
- 51.0817°N 2.3494°W
- Location: Penselwood, Somerset, England

History
- Built: 15th century

Listed Building – Grade II*
- Official name: Church of St Michael and All Angels
- Designated: 24 March 1961
- Reference no.: 1238353

The Anglican Church of St Michael and All Angels in Penselwood, Somerset, England was built in the 15th century. It is a Grade II* listed building.

== History ==
The church was largely built in the 15th century undergoing Victorian restoration in the 19th.

Between 2006 and 2008, the church roof was replaced.

The parish and benefice of Penselwood is part of the Diocese of Bath and Wells.

== Architecture ==
The stone building has stone slate roofs. It consists of a three-bay nave, a two-bay chancel and a north aisle which was added in 1848. The two-stage west tower is supported by diagonal buttresses and has a hexagonal stair turret. The tower has a peal of six bells, the oldest of which was cast in 1520.

A niche above the south door contains a sculpture of the Virgin and two kneeling figures. This is believed to date from around 1400 and was brought from Italy in the mid 19th century by the incumbent Rev Samuel Marindin.

The interior fittings are largely from the 19th century, however there is a font from the 11th century. There is a piscina from the 14th century.

== See also ==
- List of ecclesiastical parishes in the Diocese of Bath and Wells
