= Kenwalch's Castle =

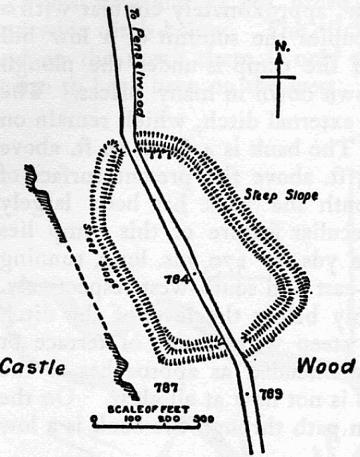
- Plan of the earthworks at Kenwalch's Castle

- Location within Somerset
- 51°06′02″N 2°21′42″W
- Location: Penselwood, Somerset, England

History
- Built: Iron Age

Site notes
- Area: 1.6 hectares (4.0 acres)

Scheduled monument
- Reference no.: 202653

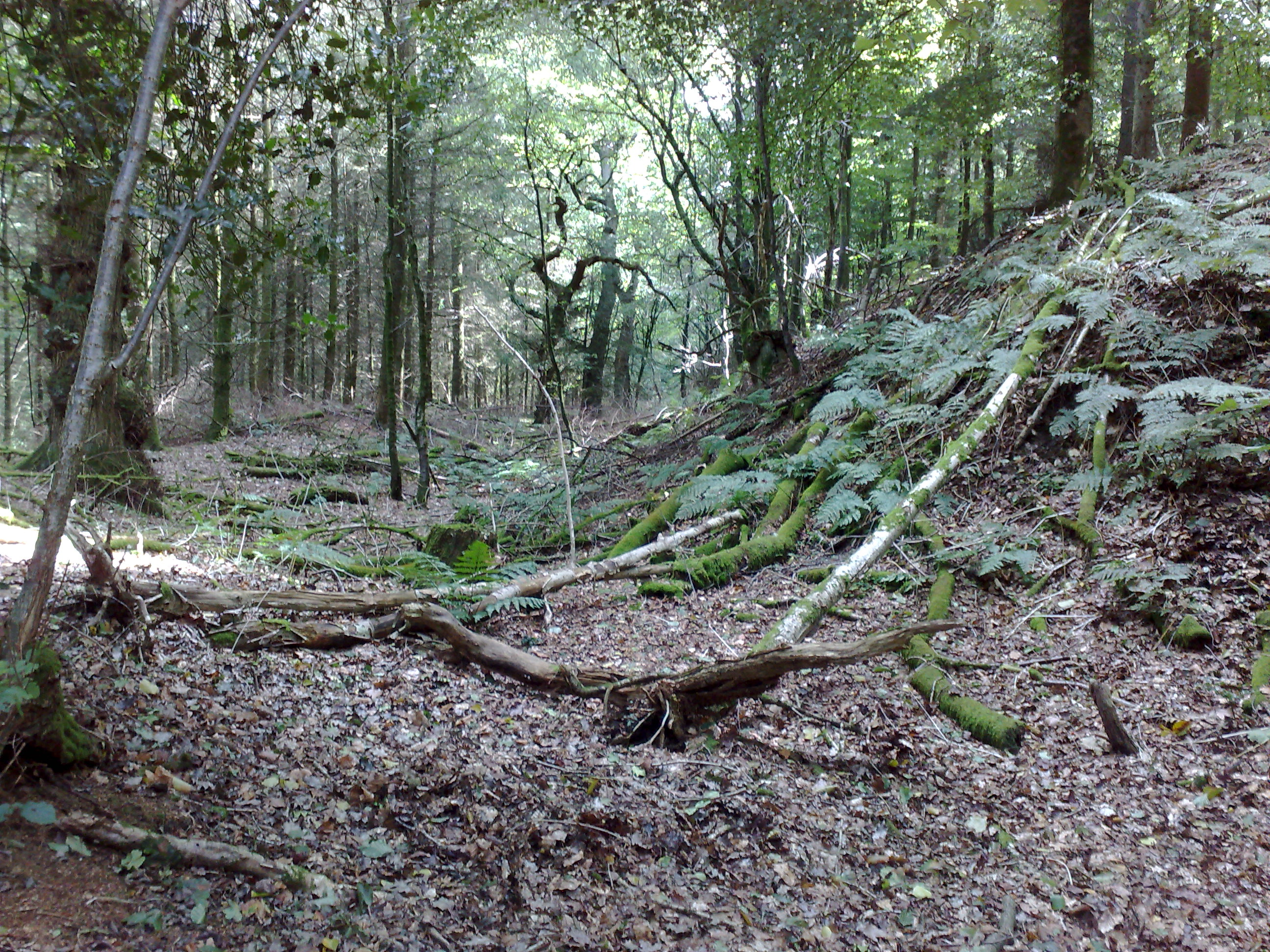

Kenwalch's Castle is probably an Iron Age hill fort that may have been converted into a Roman fortress, near Penselwood, Somerset, England, 6.6 kilometres (4 mi) east south east of Bruton at grid reference ST747335. It is a Scheduled Ancient Monument. It is believed to be named after Cenwalh of Wessex.

The site straddles the modern border between Somerset and Wiltshire, and is within Castle Wood which covers its defences and interior. The latter has an area of 1.6 hectares (4.0 acres). There is a single rampart and ditch which are well preserved in places. The earthwork bank is up to 2 metres (6 ft 7 in) high and accompanied by a 2 metres (6 ft 7 in) ditch in places. The road north from Penselwood village crosses the hill fort and probably passes through the original entrances.

It is believed to be the site of the Battle of Peonnum.

== Background ==
Hill forts developed in the Late Bronze and Early Iron Age, roughly the start of the first millennium BC. The reason for their emergence in Britain, and their purpose, has been a subject of debate. It has been argued that they could have been military sites constructed in response to invasion from continental Europe, sites built by invaders, or a military reaction to social tensions caused by an increasing population and consequent pressure on agriculture. The dominant view since the 1960s has been that the increasing use of iron led to social changes in Britain. Deposits of iron ore were located in different places to the tin and copper ore necessary to make bronze, and as a result trading patterns shifted and the old elites lost their economic and social status. Power passed into the hands of a new group of people. Archaeologist Barry Cunliffe believes that population increase still played a role and has stated "[the forts] provided defensive possibilities for the community at those times when the stress [of an increasing population] burst out into open warfare. But I wouldn't see them as having been built because there was a state of war. They would be functional as defensive strongholds when there were tensions and undoubtedly some of them were attacked and destroyed, but this was not the only, or even the most significant, factor in their construction".

== See also ==
- List of hill forts and ancient settlements in Somerset
