= Bruton Museum =

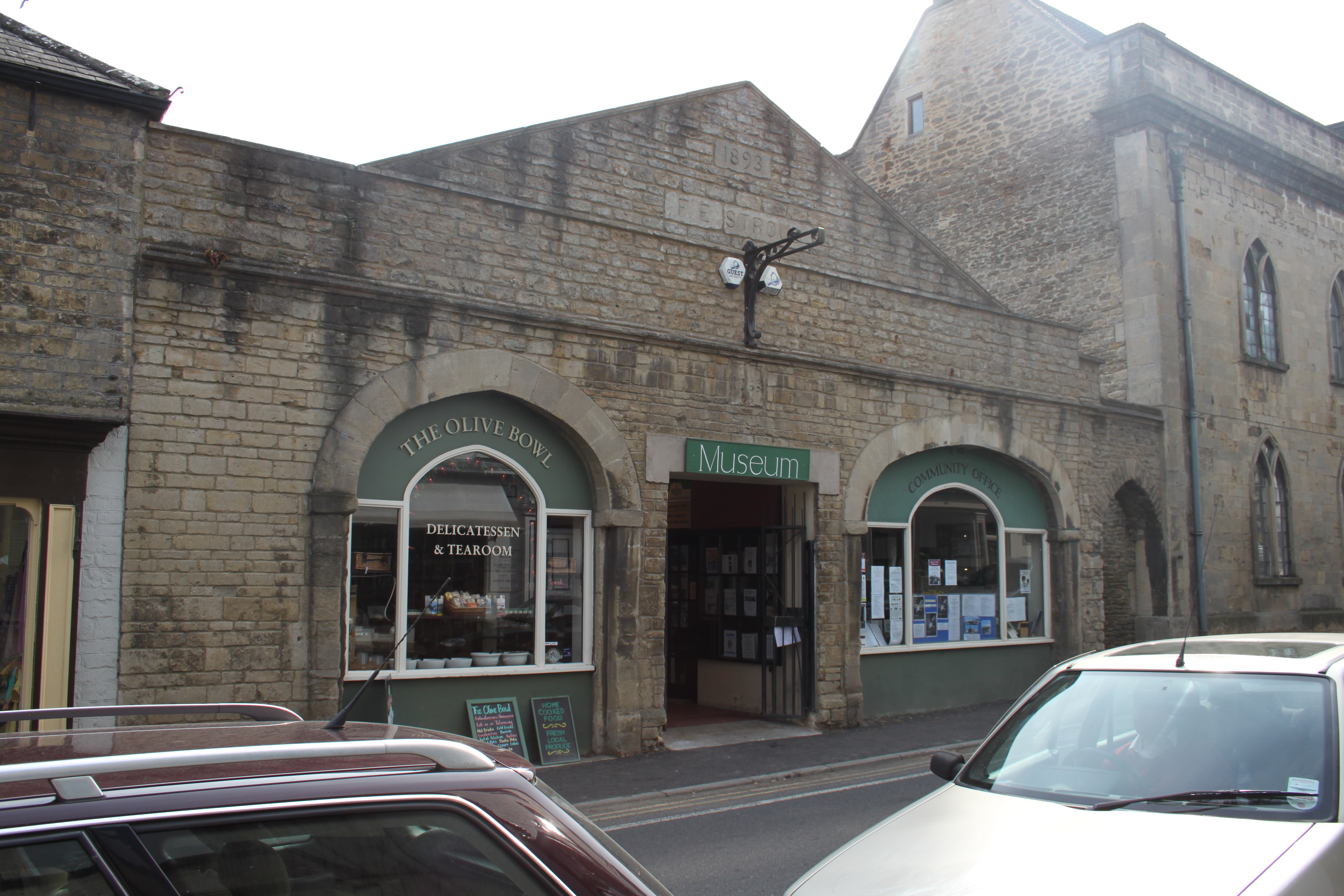

- Shown within Somerset
- Established: 1989
- Location: Bruton, Somerset, England
- Coordinates: 51.1120°N 2.4540°W
- President: Douglas Learmond

Bruton Museum is a small local museum in Bruton, Somerset, England.

The museum is housed in the Dovecote Building, in the towns High Street. The building also contains a tourist information office.

The Bruton Museum Society was formed in 1989 and involved the community and local schools in the development of the collection of local artefacts. It was initially housed in the basement of the Co-Op and then in a disused Coach House owned by the National Westminster Bank. The museum moved to its current location in 1999 after it was jointly purchased by South Somerset District Council and Bruton Town Council.

The time spent in the town by John Steinbeck is commemorated in the museum. They have also organised exhibitions at King's School including one in 2008 of the work of Ernst Blensdorf.

In 2010 an anonymous donor agreed to pay the rent on the building, removing earlier doubts about the future viability of the museum.
