= South Somerset Hydropower Group =

The South Somerset Hydropower Group (SSHG) is a group of 10 owners of former watermills in the South Somerset area of England who are installing micro-hydro turbines for electricity generation. The Group was founded as a result of an initiative by South Somerset District Council, and was the first of its kind in the United Kingdom. The Group won one of the 2005 Ashden Awards, and the concept has been adopted by a number of other similar groups.

The South Somerset Hydropower Project was begun in 2001 and the first turbine, at Gants Mill (Pitcombe), was commissioned in 2003. It now produces up to 12 kW of electricity from a 300 mm cross-flow turbine. Other sites in the Project include Clapton Mill (Clapton), Cole Manor (Bruton), Cary's Mill (Martock) and Cutterne Mill (Evercreech). When all the mills are in operation it is expected that they will collectively generate around 600 MWh per year, sufficient to supply about 150 homes and avoid the production of 260 tonnes of carbon dioxide emissions.

The SSHG estimates that there are about 40,000 mill sites that might be suitable for micro-hydropower in the United Kingdom. It has been calculated that harnessing the power from all the streams and rivers in the UK could generate 10,000 GWh per year, enough to supply 3% of national generating capacity.

== See also ==
- Category:Community electricity generation in the United Kingdom
- Energy use and conservation in the United Kingdom
- Energy policy of the United Kingdom
- Energy conservation
- Renewable energy
