= Bow Bridge, Plox =

Bow Bridge
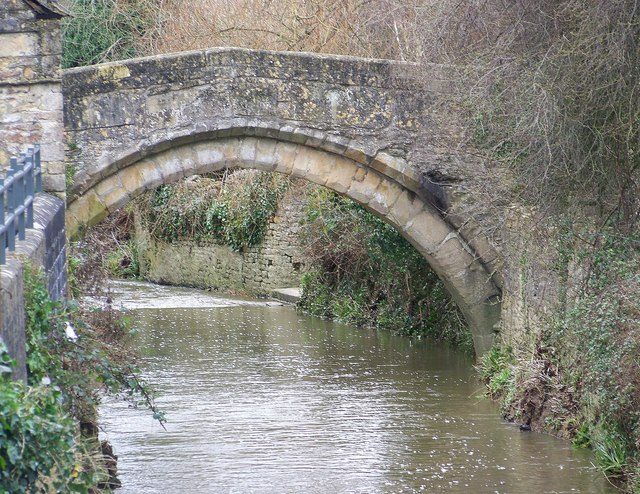

- Location within Somerset
- 51°06′43″N 2°27′18″W
- Location: Plox, Bruton, Somerset, England

History
- Built: 15th century

Listed Building – Grade I
- Designated: 24 March 1961
- Reference no.: 1176195

Scheduled monument
- Designated: 29 August 1984
- Reference no.: 1019894

Bow Bridge is a 15th-century packhorse bridge over the River Brue in Plox, Bruton, Somerset, England. It has been designated as a Grade I listed building, and Scheduled Ancient Monument.

The bridge may have been built as a link between the former Bruton Abbey, and its courthouse in the High Street. On the parapet on the western side of the bridge the remains of a carved shield can still be seen. It had acquired the name Bow Bridge by 1707.

The narrow bridge of three arches is 42 inches (1,100 mm) wide. The main arch of the bridge is built from chamfered blocks of dressed stone.

The bridge was restored after floods on 12 July 1982.

== See also ==
- List of Grade I listed buildings in South Somerset
