= Bruton Dovecote =

Limestone tower in Bruton, Somerset, United Kingdom

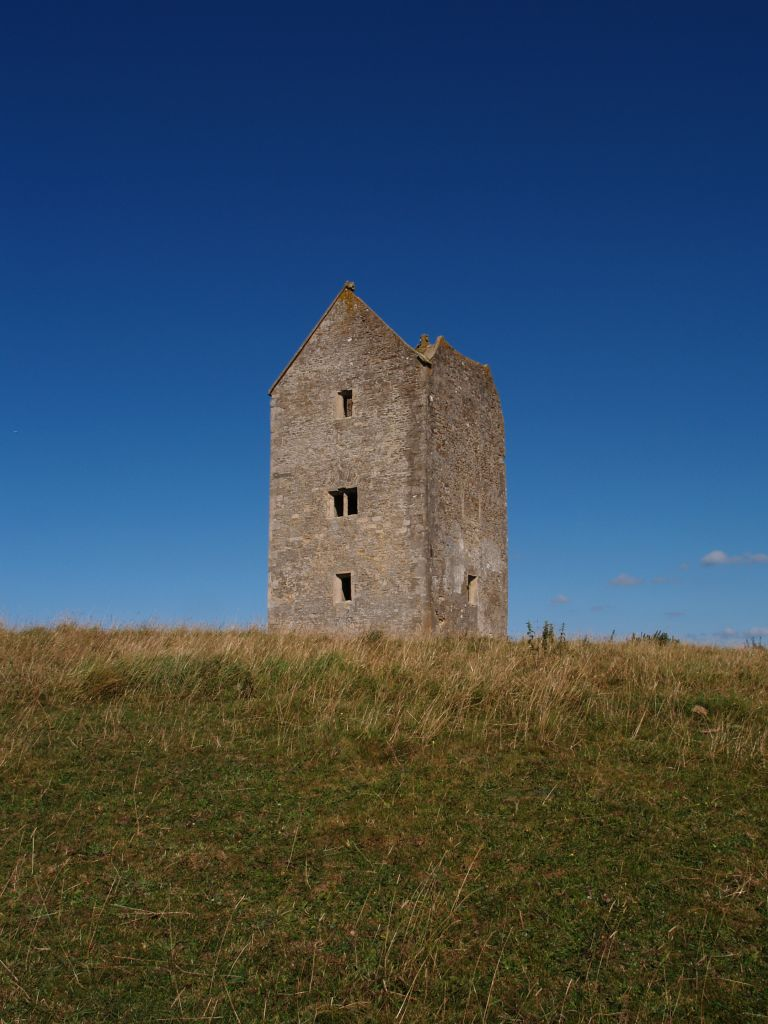

- Location within Somerset
- 51°06′29″N 2°27′11″W
- Location: Bruton, Somerset, England

History
- Built: 16th or 17th century

Site notes
- Area: 6 square metres (65 sq ft)
- Owner: National Trust

Listed Building – Grade II*
- Official name: Dovecote about 370 metres South of Bruton Church (also known as Pigeon Tower)
- Designated: 24 March 1961
- Reference no.: 1056424

Scheduled monument
- Official name: Prospect tower 230 m south of King's School
- Designated: 14 February 1953
- Reference no.: 1019895

The Bruton Dovecote is a limestone tower that was built between the 15th and 17th century in Bruton in the English county of Somerset. The structure was once used as a dovecote, and may have been a watchtower or prospect tower prior to this. It is a Grade II* listed building and scheduled monument.

It has been associated with Bruton Abbey and the Berkley family who owned the estate after the dissolution. It is known that the conversion to house pigeons and doves took place around 1780. It was acquired by the National Trust in 1915 and they have managed the site since then undertaking restoration work.

== History ==
Though the Bruton Dovecote's date of construction is not known precisely, the structure was built some time between the 15th and 17th century. Architectural historian Lydia Greeves suggests that the building was once within the deerpark of Bruton Abbey and was adapted by the monks from a gabled Tudor tower. However, John and Pamela McCann, authors of The Dovecotes of Historical Somerset, claim that the structure was not built until after the Dissolution of the Monasteries in the 1530s. The authors claim that the Berkley family, who acquired the lands of the Abbey, constructed the building as a prospect tower. Dendrochronological dating commissioned by the National Trust found that timber in the door and window frames came from trees felled between 1554 and 1586.

The conversion to be a dovecote took place around 1780. Pigeons and doves were an important food source historically kept for their eggs, flesh, and dung. Although it is now a roofless ruin with some of the windows blocked up, it previously had a chimney and the fireplace can still be seen. The National Trust acquired the freehold from Sir Henry Hugh Arthur Hoare of the Hoare baronets, whose family seat was at Stourhead, in 1915. The tower was subsequently designated as a scheduled monument in 1953 and a listed building (Grade II*) in 1961.

In the 1980s the dovecote was inspected as part of an investigation into an outbreak of psittacosis (also known as parrot disease or parrot fever), a zoonotic infectious disease caused by the bacterium Chlamydophila psittaci, at the adjoining King's School. No cause was found for the infection. In 2010 restoration work was undertaken including repairs to the tops of the walls; these are exposed as the building no longer has a roof. Wall ties were used on the south west corner where the masonry was bulging. In addition, car parking and educational signage was provided. This was partially funded by South Somerset council, Bruton Town Council and the Heritage Lottery Fund to a total of £105,000.

== Location ==
The dovecote stands on Lusty Hill to the south of Bruton overlooking the town. It is approximately 370 metres (1,210 ft) south of the Church of St Mary, and 230 metres (750 ft) south of King's School. It is on the Leland Trail.

== Architecture ==
The square tower was built of local coursed oolitic limestone with Doulting stone dressings. The walls are 2 feet 8 inches (0.81 m) thick at the base, and the tower is 6 square metres (65 sq ft) in plan. The doorway has an ovolo moulded arch which is 5 feet 9 inches (1.75 m) high. This suggests a construction date in the late 16th or early 17th century. Another entrance was made for cattle to enter at a later date but this has been blocked up. Several of the windows have also been filled with stone. On the north-east face there were two-light chamfered mullioned windows on each floor while on the north-west wall they were one- and two-light windows.

It has over 200 pigeon holes, which were installed after the original construction, possibly before 1780. Six tiers of nest boxes remain; however there were previously several more, possibly as many as 850. They are made of regular blocks of tufa each around 8 inches (200 mm) square and 16 inches (410 mm) deep.

== See also ==
- Grade II* listed buildings in South Somerset
- List of scheduled monuments in South Somerset
