= Crewkerne Castle =

Castle in Somerset, England

- Crewkerne, Somerset
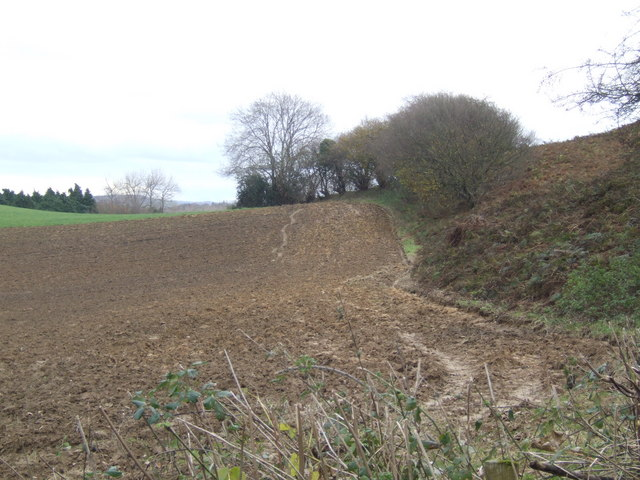
- Possible earthwork ramparts of Crewkerne Castle

Site information
- Type: Possible motte and bailey

Location
- Shown within Somerset and the British Isles
- Coordinates: 50.8929°N 2.8260°W
- Grid reference: grid reference ST420107

Site history
- Demolished: This castle was never finished

Crewkerne Castle (which is also known as Castle Hill or Croft Castle) was possibly a Norman motte and bailey castle on a mound that is situated north-west of the town of Crewkerne in Somerset, England.

== Details ==
Crewkerne Castle a 450 feet (140 m) high outcrop that since at least 1839 has been termed a castle site. Archaeological and geophysical research has found a ditch around the hilltop, with a masonry square within it, while fragments of 12th century pottery have been found on the site. One theory is that this is a Norman motte; another that it is a 13th-century manor house; alternatively it may be simply have been a local folly.

The manor had been granted to Richard de Redvers by Henry I by the year 1107 and it is thought that his son Baldwin built on the hill. In 1150 the Bishop of Salisbury was given the services of knights associated with the castle.

The location was investigated by Time Team in 2012 Series 19 episode 253 - "How to lose a castle"

== See also ==
- Castles in Great Britain and Ireland
- List of castles in Somerset
