= Rawlins Dring =

English physician

Rawlins Dring (fl. 1688), was an English physician.

== Overview ==
Dring, son of Samuel Dring, born at Bruton, Somersetshire, was educated at Wadham College, Oxford, of which he became first scholar and a fellow in 1682. He proceeded B.A. 27 June 1679, M.A. 24 May 1682. Then entering on the physic line, he practised at Sherborne, Dorset.

He was the author of Dissertatio Epistolica ad amplissimum virum & clarissimum pyrophilum J. N. Armigerum conscripta; in qua Crystallizationem Salium in unicam et propriam, uti dicunt, figuram, esse admodum incertam, aut accidentalem ex Observationibus etiam suis, contra Medicos & Chymicos hodiernos evincitur, 16mo, Amsterdam, 1688. According to Wood, "the reason why 'tis said in the title that it was printed at Amsterdam is because the College of Physicians refused to license it, having several things therein written against Dr. Martin Lister".
