= Gants Mill =

Watermill in Pitcombe, Somerset, England

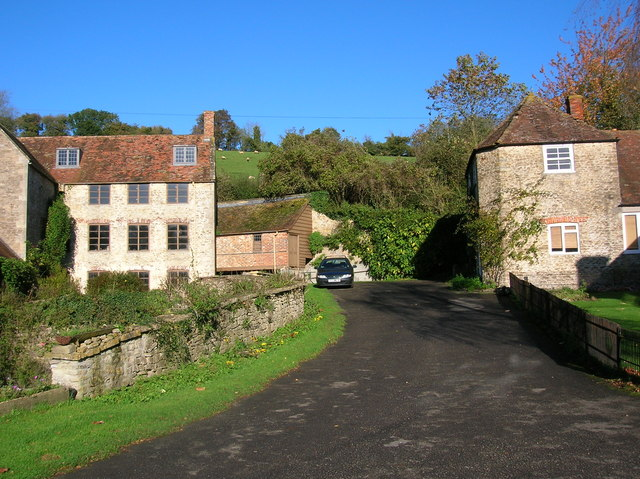

- Location within Somerset

General information
- Location: Pitcombe, Somerset, England
- Coordinates: 51.1064°N 2.4669°W
- Completed: 1810

Gants Mill is a watermill on the River Brue in Pitcombe near Bruton, Somerset, England.

Much of the current mill was built in 1810 but includes parts of the 18th-century building and possibly some material from earlier mills, as there has been a mill on the same site since about 1290 which was originally a fulling mill. It is a grade II* listed building, and takes its name from John le Gaunt who owned it in 1290. The mill was owned for four centuries by the Weston family and papers relating to the mill are now held in the Somerset Record office.

Most of the machinery, including the grindstones, conveyors, sackhoist and grain bins, date from 1888 and is still used for grinding animal feed and occasionally whole wheat flour. A 20 inches (51 cm) British Empire turbine by Armfields of Ringwood was also installed. Steam power was introduced in 1883, and replaced by semi-diesel in 1914.

The South Somerset Hydropower Group was begun in 2001 and the first turbine, at Gants Mill, was commissioned in 2003. It was turned on by Adam Hart Davis on Friday 23 April 2004. It now produces up to 12 kW (16 hp) of electricity from a 300 millimetres (12 in) crossflow turbine made by Valley Hydro of Cornwall, and has a maximum flow rate of 495 litres (109 imp gal; 131 US gal) per second.

Brian Shingler is the sixth generation of his family to act as the miller.

The water garden includes seasonal displays of iris, roses, delphiniums, day lilies, clematis, and dahlias.
