= Penselwood =

Village and civil parish in Somerset, England

Coordinates: 51.082°N 2.351°W

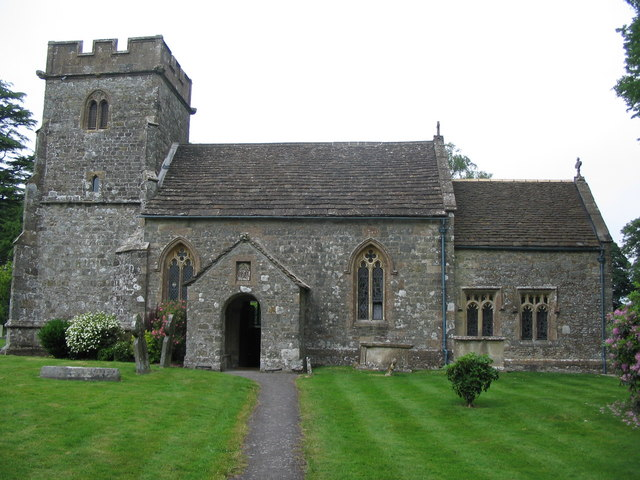
- St Michael's Church, Penselwood

- Location within Somerset
- Population: 314 (2021)
- OS grid reference: ST754314
- Unitary authority: Somerset Council
- Ceremonial county: Somerset
- Region: South West
- Country: England
- Sovereign state: United Kingdom
- Post town: Wincanton
- Postcode district: BA9
- Police: Avon and Somerset
- Fire: Devon and Somerset
- Ambulance: South Western
- UK Parliament: Glastonbury and Somerton
- Website: Parish Council

Penselwood or Pen Selwood is a village and civil parish in the English county of Somerset. It lies 4 miles (6 km) north east of Wincanton, 4 miles (6.4 km) south east of Bruton, 4 miles (6.4 km) west of Mere, and 5 miles (8.0 km) north west of Gillingham. The south-east of the parish borders Zeals and Stourhead in Wiltshire, and Bourton in Dorset. At the 2021 census, the parish had a population of 314.

== Name ==
The medieval form of the name was "Penn in Selwood", where pen (Brittonic for "head") probably referred to a hill and Selwood was the Selwood Forest which once surrounded the area. David Nash Ford associated nearby Ilchester with the Cair Pensa vel Coyt listed among the 28 cities of Britain by the History of the Britons on the basis that it should be read as an Old Welsh form of 'Penselwood' (coit being Welsh for "forest"), although others view it as three separate words: Pensa or Coyt. Bishop Ussher believed the listing referred to Exeter instead.

== History ==
A couple of miles north of the village amidst the trees are the remains of Kenwalch's Castle, an Iron Age hill fort which may be the location of the Battle of Peonnum in 658, mentioned in the Anglo-Saxon Chronicle. The English also made a stand here against the Viking invader Cnut the Great in 1016.

Pen Pits quern quarries north of Combe Bottom are a series of bowl shaped pits which were used as stone quarries during the Iron Age, Romano-British and Middle Ages.

The parish of Penselwood was part of the Norton Ferris Hundred, and from the early fifteenth century until 1609 and the death of Nicholas Wadham (1531-1609), co-founder of Wadham College, Oxford with his wife Dorothy Wadham, the Manor of Penselwood formed part of the estates of the Wadham family.

Just outside the village is the site of the medieval motte and bailey castle known as Ballands Castle.

== Governance ==
The parish council has responsibility for local issues, including setting an annual precept (local rate) to cover the council's operating costs and producing annual accounts for public scrutiny. The parish council evaluates local planning applications and works with the local police, district council officers, and neighbourhood watch groups on matters of crime, security, and traffic. The parish council's role also includes initiating projects for the maintenance and repair of parish facilities, as well as consulting with the district council on the maintenance, repair, and improvement of highways, drainage, footpaths, public transport, and street cleaning. Conservation matters (including trees and listed buildings) and environmental issues are also the responsibility of the council.

For local government purposes, since 1 April 2023, the parish comes under the unitary authority of Somerset Council. Prior to this, it was part of the non-metropolitan district of South Somerset (established under the Local Government Act 1972). It was part of Wincanton Rural District before 1974.

It is also part of a county constituency represented in the House of Commons of the Parliament of the United Kingdom. It elects one member of parliament (MP) by the first past the post system of election.

== Geography and amenities ==
Moldrums Ground includes a dry woodland surrounding unimproved grassland. Ponds on the site provide a habitat for northern crested newt. It is a local nature reserve.

Penselwood is near the start of the Leland trail, a 28-mile (45.1 km) footpath which runs from King Alfred's Tower to Ham Hill Country Park.

== Religious sites ==
The Church of St Michael and All Angels was built in the 15th century. It is a Grade II* listed building.

== In media ==
Penselwood is the setting for James Long's books, Ferney and its sequel The Lives She Left Behind, which mention many of the historical events that took place in or near the village.
