= Pill Bridge =

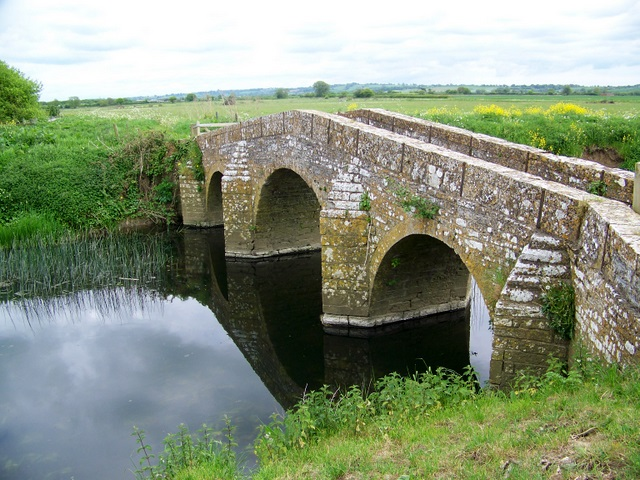
- Coordinates: 51.0077°N 2.7140°W
- Carries: pedestrian
- Crosses: River Yeo
- Locale: Between Ilchester and Long Sutton, Somerset, England
- Heritage status: Scheduled monument

Characteristics
- Design: Arch bridge

Pill Bridge is a stone arch bridge over the River Yeo between the parishes of Ilchester and Long Sutton, in the English county of Somerset. It is a scheduled monument.

The current 17th century packhorse bridge replaced an earlier 13th-century bridge at the same site.

It was the unloading point for goods destined for Ilchester, 1.5 miles (2.4 km) downstream, until the conception of the Ivelchester and Langport Navigation. A warehouse at the site was used from 1699 until 1805.

The bridge consists of three semi-circular arches. It is 48 inches (1,200 mm) wide and has a total span of 54 feet (16 m).
