= Horse Pool Camp =

Iron Age hillfort in Somerset, England

- Location within Somerset
- 50.8763°N 3.0453°W
- Location: Whitestaunton, Somerset, England

History
- Built: Bronze Age – Iron Age

Scheduled monument
- Official name: Croydon Hill

Horse Pool Camp is a univallate Iron Age hill fort enclosure in Somerset, England. It is also known as Whitestaunton Camp.

The hill fort is situated approximately 1 mile (1.6 km) west from the village of Whitestaunton, just off the Devon border. The hill fort is an oval univallate that is 300 metres (980 ft) long and 150 metres (490 ft) wide.

== See also ==
- List of hill forts and ancient settlements in Somerset
