= Cary Castle =

Former castle on Lodge Hill

- Somerset, England
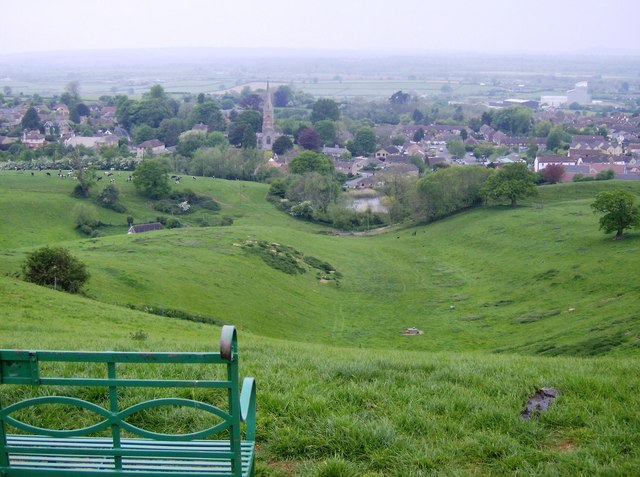
- Earthworks of Cary Castle

Site information
- Type: Motte and bailey
- Condition: Only earthworks remain

Location
- Shown within Somerset
- Coordinates: 51.0880°N 2.5140°W
- Grid reference: grid reference ST641322

Cary Castle stood on Lodge Hill overlooking the town of Castle Cary, Somerset, England. It is a scheduled monument.

== History ==
The motte and bailey castle was built either by Walter of Douai or by his son Robert who also built Bampton Castle in Devon. During The Anarchy Robert was exiled by King Stephen and the castle given to Ralph Lovel who then sided with Robert, 1st Earl of Gloucester against the king. King Stephen abandoned his siege of Bristol in 1138 and besieged Cary Castle with fire and showers of stones from siege engines. This lasted until the garrison surrendered due to hunger.

In 1143 Stephen lost control of the West Country after the Battle of Wilton. Henry de Tracy gained control of Cary Castle and built another stronghold in front of the older castle, however this was demolished when William Fitz Robert, 2nd Earl of Gloucester and his troops arrived to take the castle. The Lovels later achieved the return of the castle, and their descendants were lords of the manor until the 14th century.

By 1468 the castle had been abandoned. Around that time a manor house was built on or adjacent to the site of the castle, possibly by Baron Zouche. It later passed to Edward Seymour, 1st Duke of Somerset but by the 1630s it was occupied by Edward Kirton. It was largely demolished at the end of the 18th century.

== Investigations and preservation ==
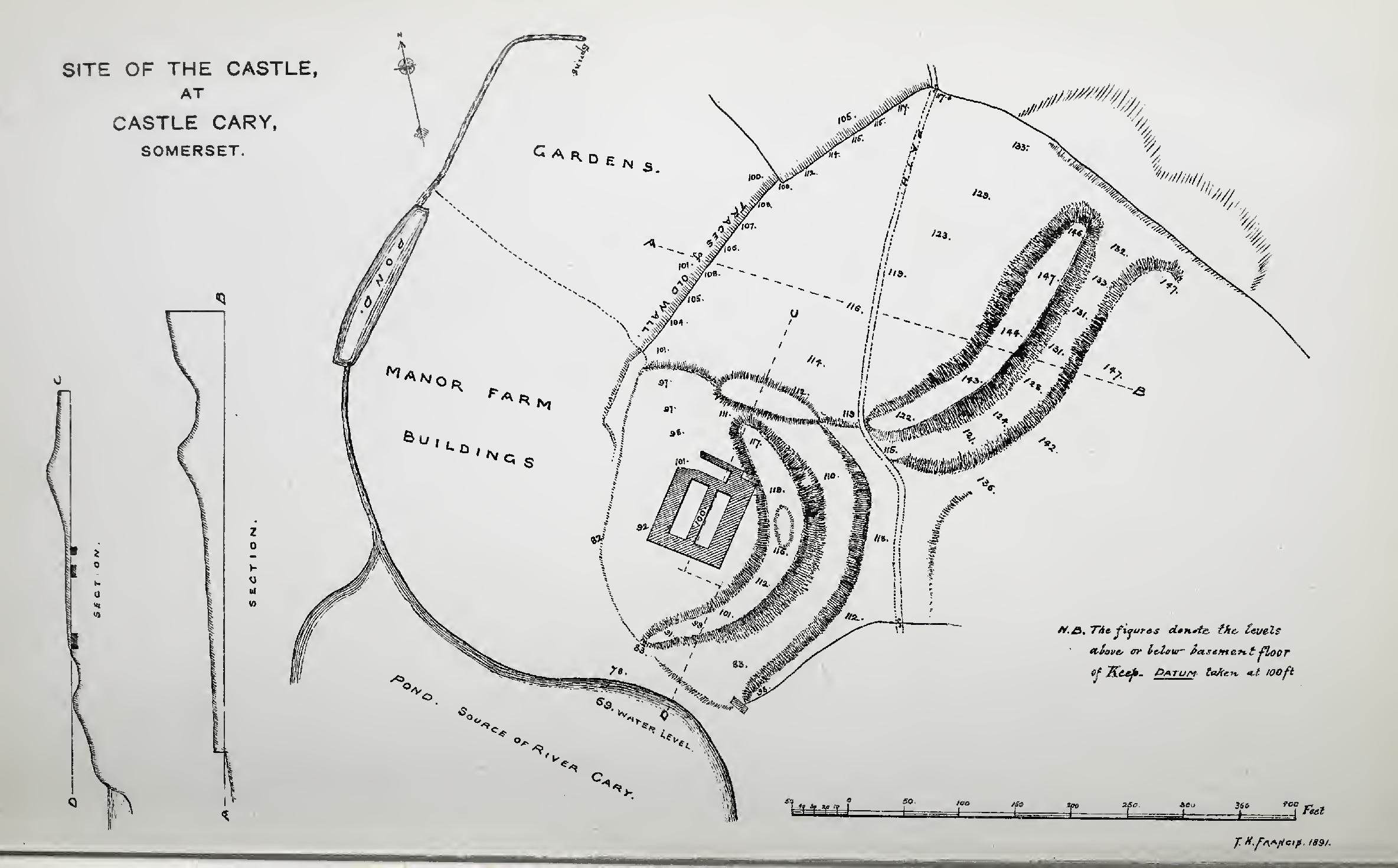
A plan of the castle remains in 1890

The earliest known excavations took place in 1856 and were carried out by Rev. R. J. Meade on the lower mound, though "resulted in nothing". J. H. Francis and Rev. J. A. Bennett led excavations at the castle in 1890. The cost of the work was funded by the town's inhabitants. The investigation demonstrated the foundations of a 24-metre square stone keep and an inner and outer bailey. Geophysical surveys were carried out at the castle in 2011. The keep was re-excavated in 2023 by Cotswold Archaeology as part of a programme of reinterpretation.

All that remains are the earthworks. Some of the castle's stonework may be seen in the town's buildings, and the Castle Cary and District Museum has a display about its history.

== Architecture ==
In its complete form, the castle consisted of a stone keep surrounded by a small enclosure (the inner bailey) with a second larger enclosure (the outer bailey) to the north. The stone keep was built using local Hadspen stone, as well as Hamstone and Doulting stone. A lack of weathering on the plinth around the forebuilding to the keep was interpreted as evidence that the castle was relatively short lived after the construction of the keep. In places, the castle ditch was 17 metres (56 ft) wide and 6 metres (20 ft) deep.

== See also ==
- Castles in Great Britain and Ireland
- List of castles in England

== Sources ==
- Fry, Plantagenet Somerset, The David & Charles Book of Castles, David & Charles, 1980. ISBN 0-7153-7976-3
