= Ballands Castle =

Former castle in Somerset, England

- Penselwood, Somerset

Site information
- Type: Motte and bailey
- Condition: Earthworks remain

Location
- Shown within Somerset and the British Isles
- Coordinates: 51.0778°N 2.3540°W
- Grid reference: grid reference ST753310

Ballands Castle was a castle near the village of Penselwood, Somerset, England.

== History ==
Balland Castle was a motte and bailey castle, probably built after the Norman Conquest of England in 1066, near the village of Penselwood in Somerset. The castle sits close to the contemporary Norman castles of Cockroad Wood and Castle Orchard, and may have been built as part of a system of fortifications to control the surrounding area.

The motte of the castle is now around 5 m high, and up to 9 m wide. The bailey lies to the south, and both the motte and the bailey are surrounded by ditches.

Today the castle site is a scheduled monument.

== See also ==
- Castles in Great Britain and Ireland
- List of castles in England

== Bibliography ==
- Creighton, Oliver Hamilton. (2005) Castles and Landscapes: Power, Community and Fortification in Medieval England. London: Equinox. ISBN 978-1-904768-67-8.
