= Montacute Castle =

Castle in Somerset, England

- Montacute, Somerset
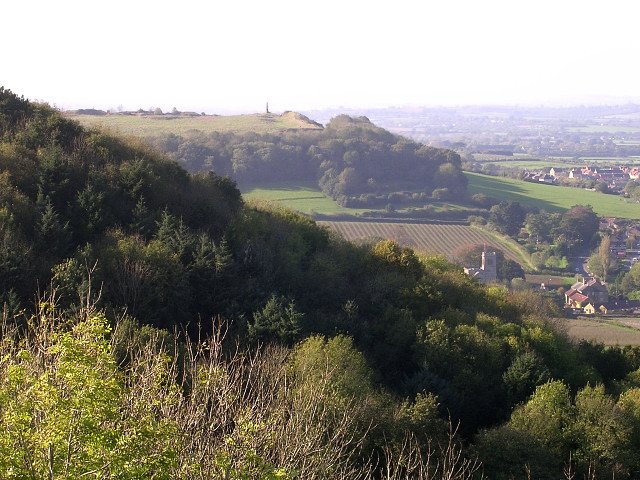
- View from the site of Monacute Castle

Site information
- Type: Motte and bailey
- Owner: National Trust
- Open to the public: Yes

Location
- Shown within Somerset and the British Isles
- Coordinates: 50.9493°N 2.7231°W
- Grid reference: grid reference ST493169

Site history
- Battles/wars: 1068 uprising

Montacute Castle was a castle built on a hill overlooking the village of Montacute, Somerset, England.

== Details ==
Montacute Castle was built after the Norman Conquest of England in 1066 by Robert of Mortain. The castle was named Mons Acutus – literally, sharp hill – built on land within the Saxon settlement of Bishopston that Robert had acquired from Athelney Abbey in exchange for the manor of Purse Caundle, an expensive exchange for Robert. The natural features of the hill were used to form an oval-shaped motte and an inner bailey, surrounded by an outer bailey beyond. Village tradition is that a wooden keep was originally built, followed later by a stone castle. A park for hunting was established alongside the castle and the village. Bishopston later adopted the Norman name.

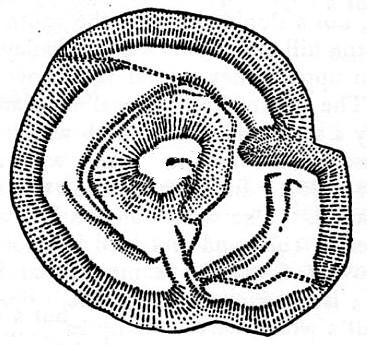
Plan of Montacute Castle

The castle is strategically placed to overlook and control traffic on the Fosseway Roman road and the Somerset levels, so hampering any military movements, The location for the castle is also thought to have been a deliberate political statement by Robert: before the battle of Hastings, the Anglo-Saxons had discovered what they believed to be a holy cross on the hill. Taken into battle by Harold Godwinson who held it in great esteem, "the holy cross" had also been used as the battle cry of the Anglo-Saxon army against the Normans.

Robert made Montacute Castle the caput, or main castle, of his honour, abandoning another castle he built in Somerset, Castle Neroche. The castle was unsuccessfully besieged in 1068 during a major Anglo-Saxon revolt against Norman rule, but the rebels were defeated by Geoffrey de Montbray, the Bishop of Coutances. In 1102, however, William of Mortain (Robert's son) gave the castle and the surrounding lands to the Cluniac order, who founded Montacute Priory there.

The castle was no longer of military value and was left to decline, although the castle chapel, dedicated to Saint Michael, continued in use until at least 1315. The antiquarian John Leland described the castle in 1540 as "party fell to ruin", and by this period it was being quarried for its stone, ultimately resulting in its disappearance. The castle chapel was eventually rebuilt after the destruction of the surrounding castle.

Today the site is a scheduled monument. An 18th century folly, St. Michael's Hill Tower, named after the castle chapel, stands on the site today, making use of part of the castle chapel's foundations. The site is owned by the National Trust and is open to the public. English Heritage staff surveyed the site for the National Trust in April 2000.

== See also ==
- Castles in Great Britain and Ireland
- List of castles in England

== Bibliography ==
- Adkins L. and R. A. Adkins. (1989) "Excavation on St. Michael’s Hill," Proceedings of the Somerset Archaeological and Natural History Society 133, pp. 125–129.
- Creighton, Oliver Hamilton. (2005) Castles and Landscapes: Power, Community and Fortification in Medieval England. London: Equinox. ISBN 978-1-904768-67-8.
- Liddiard, Robert. (2005) Castles in Context: Power, Symbolism and Landscape, 1066 to 1500. Macclesfield, UK: Windgather Press. ISBN 0-9545575-2-2.
- Mackenzie, J. D. (1896) Castles of England. New York: Macmillan.
- Pounds, Norman John Greville. (1994) The Medieval Castle in England and Wales: a social and political history. Cambridge: Cambridge University Press. ISBN 978-0-521-45828-3.
- Richardson, Miranda. (2003) English Heritage Somerset Extensive Urban Survey: an Archaeological Assessment of Montacute. Somerset: Somerset County Council.
