= Wimble Toot =

Burial mound or motte

- Babcary, Somerset
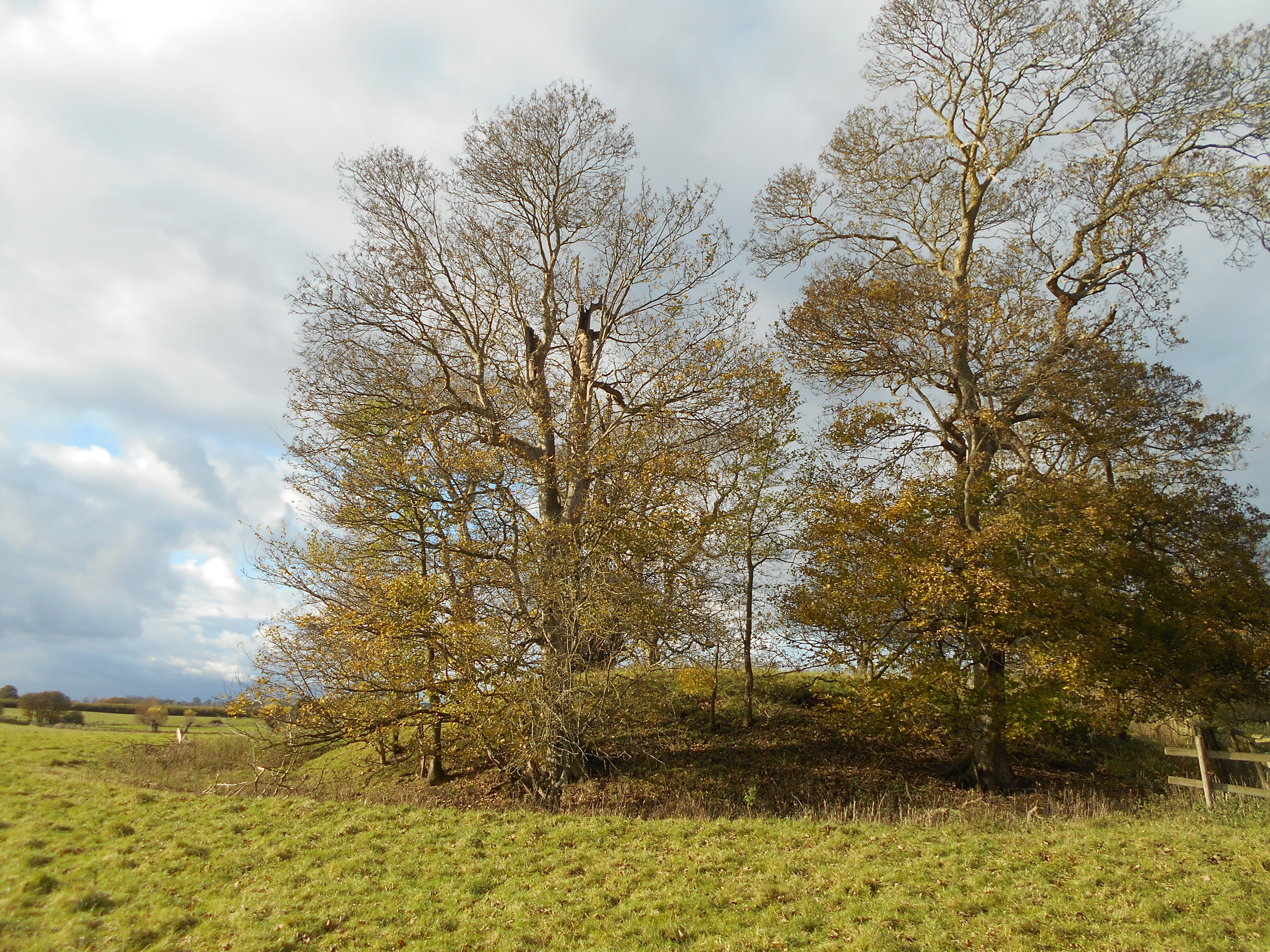

Site information
- Type: tumulus or motte

Location
- Shown within Somerset and the British Isles
- Coordinates: 51.0497°N 2.6291°W
- Grid reference: grid reference ST560280

Wimble Toot is a burial mound or, possibly, a motte built near the village of Babcary, Somerset, England. It is a scheduled ancient monument with a list entry number of 1015279.

== Etymology ==
Toot is derived from Old English tōt, meaning a lookout point.

== Details ==
Wimble Toot is generally interpreted as a typical bowl barrow dating to the Bronze Age, between 2600 and 700 BC. Today the site forms a circular earthwork, 27.47 metres (90.1 ft) across and 2.74 metres (9.0 ft) high, with a ditch on the north-west and south-east sides, on the top of a ridge, overlooking a brook which runs into the River Cary and the old Roman road of the Fosse Way. The site is of an undetermined age, and appears to have been a part of the Romano-British landscape. In Roman times, Wimble Toot was situated at a crossroads.

An alternative interpretation is that the monument is a possible motte built between 1067 and 1069. According to this view, Wimble Toot was probably built by the Norman lord Robert of Mortain to protect the River Cary and the nearby settlement of Ilchester.

Today the site is a scheduled monument.
