= Cockroad Wood Castle =

Castle in Somerset, England

- Charlton Musgrove, Somerset
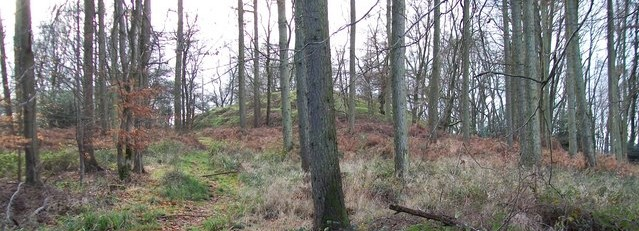
- Motte of Cockroad Wood Castle

Site information
- Type: Motte and bailey
- Condition: Earthworks remain

Location
- Shown within Somerset and the British Isles
- Coordinates: 51.0881°N 2.36374°W
- Grid reference: grid reference ST746321

Cockroad Wood Castle was a castle near Wincanton but now in the parish of Charlton Musgrove, Somerset, England.

== History ==
Cockroad Wood Castle was a motte and bailey castle, probably built soon after the Norman Conquest of England in 1066. The castle sits close to the contemporary Norman castles of Ballands and Castle Orchard, and may have been built a system of fortifications to control the surrounding area. By 1086 the surrounding land was held by Walter of Douai, although no documentary evidence of the castle remains.

The castle was built with a motte and two baileys, running along a north–south ridge, with a possible entrance to the east. The motte today is 13.5m wide, up to 7.5m high and is surrounded by a 1.25m deep ditch. The two baileys were probably linked to the motte by wooden bridges.

Today the castle site is a scheduled monument.

== See also ==
- Castles in Great Britain and Ireland
- List of castles in England

== Bibliography ==
- Creighton, Oliver Hamilton. (2005) Castles and Landscapes: Power, Community and Fortification in Medieval England. London: Equinox. ISBN 978-1-904768-67-8.
