= Walter of Douai =

Norman knight

Walter of Douai (Old Norman: Wautier de Douai) (born c.1046, died: c.1107) was a Norman knight, probably at the Battle of Hastings, and a major landowner in South West England after the Norman Conquest, being feudal baron of Bampton in Devon and of Castle Cary in Somerset. He is given various names and titles in different sources including: Walter (or Walschin or Walscin) de Douai. Douai is sometimes written as Dowai. He has also been called Gautier de Douai and later Walter the Fleming.

== Family ==
Walter was the son of Urso of Douai, that was then a fiefdom of the counts of Flanders and now is a commune in the Nord département in northern France. Located on the river Scarpe some 40 km from Lille and 25 km from Arras.

He married Emma (or Eddeva) of Devon, and may have had two children: Richilde de Douai and Ralph (of Tintinhull) Lovel. He also had a second wife. His son Robert built Bampton Castle in Devon.

== Norman Conquest ==
Walter likely fought at the Battle of Hastings in 1066, though he is not among those for whom proof of participation has been found.

In the aftermath of the victory, William the Conqueror entrusted the conquest of the south-west of England to his half-brother Robert of Mortain. Expecting stiff resistance, Robert marched west into Somerset, supported by forces under Walter of Douai, who entered from the north; a third force, under the command of William de Moyon, landed by sea along the Somerset coast.

== Post Conquest ==
Following the defeat of the Saxons by the Normans in 1066, various castles were set up in Somerset by the new lords such as that at Dunster, and the manors were awarded to followers of William the Conqueror such as William de Moyon and Walter of Douai.

Walter of Douai was feudal baron of Bampton in Devon and of Castle Cary in Somerset.

After the Norman invasion the land on which Bridgwater stands was given to Walter of Douai, hence becoming known variously as Burgh-Walter, Brugg-Walter and Brigg-Walter, eventually corrupted to Bridgwater. An alternative version is that it derives from "Bridge of Walter" (i.e. Walter's Bridge).

In the Domesday Book of 1086 Walter was described as holding land in Worle, Somerset, Weare, Sparkford and Bratton Seymour.

Others holdings in Somerset and Devon included: Allerton, Alstone, Alston Sutton, Ansford, Badgworth, Bathealton, Bawdrip, Bradney, Bratton Seymour, Brean, Burnham on Sea, Chilcompton, Crook, Dunwear, Horsey, Huntspill, Pawlett, Sparkford, Stretcholt, Tarnock, Walpole, Watchet, Wembdon Wincanton, Berrynarbor, Coleridge (Stokenham), Combe Raleigh, Dipford, Dunsford, Goodrington, Greenway, Kerswell (Hockworthy), Knowstone, Little Rackenford, Luppitt, Mohuns Ottery, Shapcombe, Spurway, Stoke Fleming, Townstal, Uffculme, Woodcombe and Holacombe. Many of these were let to tenants.

Cary Castle, a motte and bailey castle was built either by Walter of Douai or by his son Robert who also built Bampton Castle in Devon. He was also holder of the land on which Cockroad Wood Castle was built.

== See also ==
- https://archive.org/details/lafodalitdansle00brasgoog La féodalité dans le Nord de la France. Histoire du château & de la châtellenie de Douai. (French language). Author: Félix Brassart. Published 1877.

== Bibliography ==
- Bush, Robin (1994). Somerset: The Complete Guide. Dovecote Press. pp. 214. ISBN 1-874336-26-1.
- Dunning, Robert (1995). Somerset Castles. Tiverton, UK: Somerset Books. ISBN 978-0-86183-278-1.
- Dunning, Robert (2001). Somerset Monasteries. Stroud, UK: Tempus. ISBN 0-7524-1941-2.
- Farr, Grahame (1954). Somerset Harbours. London: Christopher Johnson.
- Fleming, Robin (2003). Domesday Book and the Law: Society and Legal Custom in Early Medieval England. Cambridge University Press. ISBN 978-0-521-52846-7.
- Green, Judith A. (2002). The Aristocracy of Norman England. Cambridge University Press. p. 66. ISBN 978-0-521-52465-0.
- Keats-Rohan, K. S. B. (1999). Domesday People: Prosopography of persons occurring in English documents, 1066-1166. Boydell & Brewer. ISBN 978-0-85115-722-1.
- Prior, Stuart. (2006) The Norman Art of War: a Few Well-Positioned Castles. Stroud, UK: Tempus. ISBN 0-7524-3651-1.
- Robinson, Stephen (1992). Somerset Place Names. Wimbourne, UK: Dovecote Press. ISBN 1-874336-03-2.
