= Dundon Hill Hillfort =

Iron Age hillfort in Somerset, England

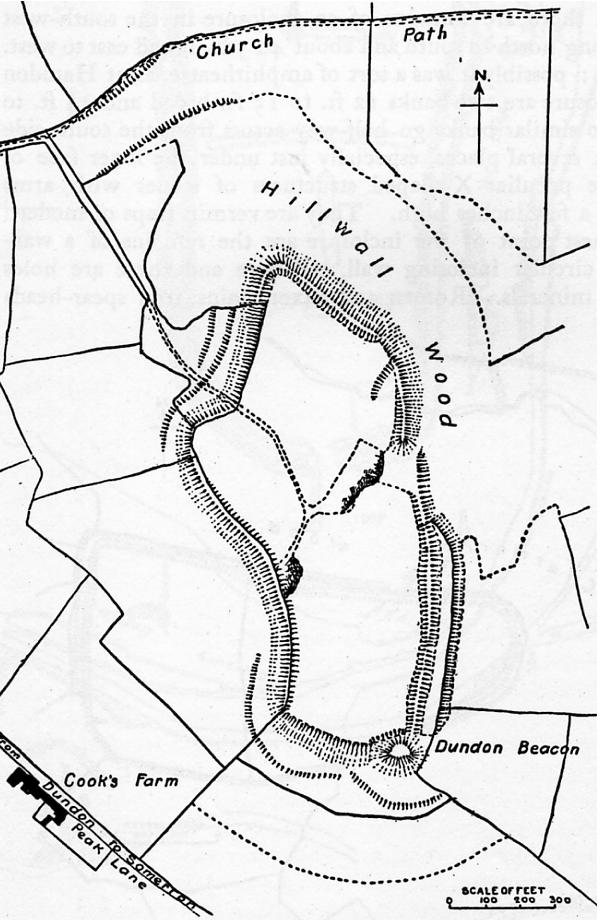
- Plan of the site

- Location within Somerset
- 51°05′13″N 2°44′13″W
- Location: Compton Dundon, Somerset, England

History
- Built: Iron Age

Scheduled monument
- Designated: 1996
- Reference no.: 22076

Dundon Hill Hillfort is an Iron Age hillfort in Compton Dundon, Somerset, England. It has been designated as a Scheduled Ancient Monument. South east of the site is a Bronze Age bowl barrow which, it has been suggested, was later modified as a Norman Motte, known as Dundon Beacon.

The 5 hectares (12 acres) site is guarded by a single bank ranging from 0.5 metres (1.6 ft) to 2.5 metres (8.2 ft) high, however parts of the site have been damaged by quarrying. Flint flakes, Bronze Age pottery, and Iron Age pottery have also been found, which are now in the Museum of Somerset.

Dundon Hill, also sometimes called Dundon Beacon, stands out prominently in the flat country of King's Sedgemoor, rising to a height of 270 feet. One writer on ancient earthworks notes that it "looks like a respectable mountain and is in fact a natural island fortress". The whole of the hilltop is enclosed by the single bank of stones and earth.

== See also ==
- List of hill forts and ancient settlements in Somerset
