= Bruton =

Town in Somerset, England

Coordinates: 51.113411°N 2.452801°W

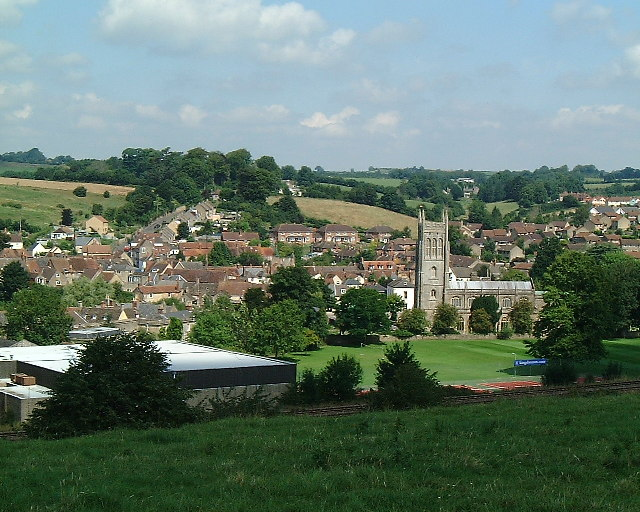
- Bruton viewed from the Dovecote

- Location within Somerset
- Population: 2,907 (2011)
- OS grid reference: ST684350
- Unitary authority: Somerset Council
- Ceremonial county: Somerset
- Region: South West
- Country: England
- Sovereign state: United Kingdom
- Post town: BRUTON
- Postcode district: BA10
- Dialling code: 01749
- Police: Avon and Somerset
- Fire: Devon and Somerset
- Ambulance: South Western
- UK Parliament: Glastonbury and Somerton
- Website: Town Council

Bruton (/ˈbruːtən/ BROO-tən) is a small market town, and civil parish in Somerset, England, on the River Brue and the A359 between Frome and Yeovil. It is 7 miles (11 km) south-east of Shepton Mallet, just south of Snakelake Hill and Coombe Hill, 10 miles (16 km) north-west of Gillingham and 12 miles (19 km) south-west of Frome. The town and ward have a population of 2,907. The parish includes the hamlets of Wyke Champflower and Redlynch.

Bruton has a museum of items from the Jurassic period onwards. It includes a table used by the author John Steinbeck on a six-month stay.

The Brue is flood-prone – in 1768 it wrecked a stone bridge. The 242.8 mm of rain that fell on 28 June 1917 left a river watermark on a pub wall 20 feet above the mean. In 1984 a protective dam was built upstream.

== History ==
The Church of St Mary, Bruton was founded by Ine of Wessex in the 7th century,

Bruton was listed in the Domesday Book of 1086 as Briuuetone, meaning "Vigorously flowing river" from the Old English tor and Celtic briw meaning vigour. The river has been the site of several watermills and in 2003 the South Somerset Hydropower Group installed their first hydroelectric turbine at Gants Mill at nearby Pitcombe.

Bruton Abbey, a medieval Augustinian priory from which a wall remains in the Plox close to Bow Bridge, was sold after the dissolution of the monasteries to the courtier Sir Maurice Berkeley (died 1581), whose Bruton branch of the Berkeley family converted it into a mansion, which was demolished in the late 18th century.

The Dovecote which overlooks Bruton dates from the 16th century. It was at one time used as a house, possibly as a watchtower and as a dovecote. It is a Grade II* listed building, and an ancient monument, and is managed by the National Trust. The building was once within the deerpark of the Abbey. It was adapted by the monks from a gabled Tudor tower. The conversion to a dovecote took place around 1780. It has over 200 pigeonholes.

Bruton was part of the hundred of Bruton.

The town is referenced in a folk song "The Bramble Briar", which is also known by the title "Bruton Town". A rare copy of an inspeximus of Magna Carta was found in Bruton in the 1950s and claimed by King's School. The sale of the copy to the Australian National Museum paid for much building work at the school.

Much of the town's history appears in the Bruton Museum's Dovecote Building in the High Street. It includes a tourist information office. Bruton Museum Society, formed in 1989, involves the community and local schools in developing the collection of local artefacts. It moved in 1999 to its current location, which was jointly purchased by South Somerset District Council and Bruton Town Council. The museum also marks the time spent in the town by John Steinbeck. It has organised exhibitions at King's School, including one in 2008 on the work of Ernst Blensdorf. In 2010, an anonymous donor agreed to pay the rent on the building, removing earlier doubts about its viability.

In 2014, Hauser & Wirth opened a gallery and arts centre at a derelict farm outside Bruton.

== Governance ==
The first tier of local government is the parish council, which styles itself as Bruton Town Council. The body sets an annual precept (local rate) to cover its operating costs and produces annual accounts for public scrutiny. The town council is responsible for the town's cemetery and allotments, and maintains St Mary's churchyard. It is consulted on local planning applications and works with local police, district council officers and neighbourhood watch groups on matters of crime, security and traffic. It initiates projects for maintaining and repairing parish facilities, and consults with the district council on maintenance, repair and improvement of highways, drainage, footpaths, public transport and street cleaning. Conservation matters (including trees and listed buildings) and environmental issues are also covered.

For local government purposes, since 1 April 2023, the village comes under the unitary authority of Somerset Council. Prior to this, it was part of the non-metropolitan district of South Somerset, which was formed on 1 April 1974 under the Local Government Act 1972, having previously been part of Wincanton Rural District.

For elections to Parliament, Bruton is within the Glastonbury and Somerton county constituency.

== Transport ==
Bruton station is on the Reading–Taunton line, a branch of the Great Western Main Line, between Westbury and Taunton. The route is the most direct between London (Paddington) and the West Country (ending at Penzance), but is slower for geographical reasons. The stretch between Westbury and Castle Cary is also part of the Heart of Wessex line, served by Great Western Railway services between Bristol Temple Meads and Weymouth.

In December 2015, South West Trains introduced a service between London Waterloo, Salisbury and Yeovil Pen Mill, giving Bruton its first direct London service for some years.

Bus services are operated by South West Coaches and Somerset Council.

== Geography ==
Work to build the railway at Bruton Railway Cutting exposed geology of the epoch of the Middle Jurassic. It is among the best places in England to display the stratigraphic distinction of fossil ammonites in the Subcontractus and Morrisi zones.

The nearby Godminster Lane Quarry and Railway Cutting is another geological Site of Special Scientific Interest, for study of the Inferior Oolite limestones, of the Middle Jurassic age, laid down in a warm shallow sea some 175 million years ago. The site is unique in that the limestones seen are more closely comparable with rocks of similar age found in the Cotswolds than with rock sequences elsewhere in Somerset. However, the rocks contain the rich assemblage of ammonites typical of the north Dorset/south Somerset area. This feature, along with the unusual limestone sequence, makes the site unique. It is also important as a reference for three sub-divisions (zones) of the Inferior Oolite – the laeviscula, discites and concavum zones.

== Churches ==
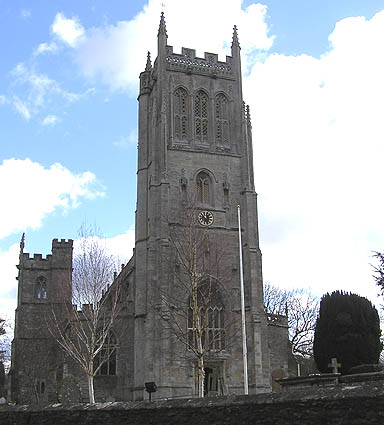
St Mary's Church, Bruton

Both the 14th-century Church of St Mary, and the Church of the Holy Trinity in Wyke Champflower, dated at 1623, are Grade I listed buildings.

John Wesley preached in Bruton in 1776. A Methodist chapel at West End was opened in 1848. The congregation was served by the Somerset Mission Circuit and more recently by the Somerset Mendip Circuit.

== Schools ==
Bruton is known for two long-standing secondary schools: King's School (founded 1519) and Sexey's School (founded 1889). Both have a sixth form, and a tradition of boarding.

One of Bruton's notable historic characters was Hugh Sexey (1556–1619), who was born locally and attended Bruton Grammar School. By the age of 43 he was appointed as royal auditor of the Exchequer to Queen Elizabeth I and later King James I. After his death, his trustees established Sexey's Hospital in Bruton as an institution to care for the elderly. Sexey's trust was mainly involved with educational causes. The politician behind the Education Act 1902, Henry Hobhouse (1854–1937), was involved in the founding of Sexey's School as well as Sunny Hill school (later Bruton School for Girls, open from 1901 to 2022).

== Notable residents ==
- Sir Maurice Berkeley (by 1514–1581), built a mansion house on the site of Bruton Priory
- Stephen Batman (died 1584), an English translator and author.
- Maurice Berkeley (c. 1576–1617), landowner and gentleman, MP at various times between 1597 and 1614.
- Richard Towgood (c.1595–1683), an English royalist churchman, Dean of Bristol from 1667.
- Charles Berkeley, 2nd Viscount Fitzhardinge (1599–1668), politician and MP at various times between 1621 and 1668.
- Sir William Berkeley (1605–1677), an English colonial administrator.
- Rawlins Dring (fl. 1688), an English physician.
- Richard Michell (1805–1877), churchman and academic, first principal of Hertford College, Oxford.
- Michael Bennett (1909–1982), cricketer, played 109 first-class cricket games for Somerset
- Cameron Mackintosh (born 1946), knight bachelor, musical theatre producer
- Koos Bekker (born 1952), businessman
- Mariella Frostrup (born 1962), newspaper columnist, lives nearby.
- Iwan Wirth (born 1970), art dealer
- George Osborne (born 1971), former politician and newspaper editor
- Joe Wright (born 1972), director and Haley Bennett (born 1988), actress
- Sarah Beeny (born 1972), property developer and TV personality
- Caroline Corr (born 1973), musician
- Haley Bennett (born 1988), an American actress, lives locally.
- Aaron Taylor-Johnson (born 1990), actor and Sam Taylor-Johnson (born 1967), artist and director
