= Poolamacca Station =

Pastoral lease in New South Wales

Coordinates: 31.505°S 141.472°E

Location in New South Wales

Poolamacca Station is a pastoral lease that operates as a sheep station in the outback of New South Wales.

It is situated about 50 kilometres (31 mi) north of Broken Hill and 174 kilometres (108 mi) north east of Mannahill at the eastern end of the Barrier Range adjoining Sturts Meadows. The station currently occupies an area of 40,000 acres (16,187 ha). The abandoned township of Tarrawingee is situated within the boundaries of the station.

The property was established in the 1860s with the first owners of the run being Messrs Jones and Goode. In 1867 a shepherd staged a hoax with a white quartz gold find that lead to an aborted gold rush to the area. The first property in the area was Mount Gipps Station in 1865, with Corona, Mundi Mundi and Poolamacca being established shortly afterwards.

Sidney Kidman worked at Poolamacca during the 1870s as a boundary rider and stockman.

In 1877 the property was put up for auction by the trustees of the estate of Messrs E. M. Bagot and G. Bennett. At this stage the property was approximately 900 square miles (2,331 km^{2}) in size along with a flock of 34,906 sheep. The property comprised ten separate runs including the 64,000 acre Bijerkerno run to the 25,000 acre Torrowangee run.

John Brougham acquired a half share in Poolamacca in 1889 and later secured the lease outright. Brougham remained at Poolamacca until 1915 when he moved to Adelaide. In 1892 approximately 50 Aboriginal people, were moved to Poolamacca station which "under the regime of the late owner, Mr J. Brougham, constituted a sanctuary for the last remaining Aboriginal inhabitants of the Barrier Ranges and adjacent areas".

The lease was later split into two properties: Poolamacca and Wilangee in the 1920s.

Moss Smith sold the property in 1927 to the Pastoral company of Adelaide following the death of his daughter whose body was found buried in a warren in Poolamacca late the year before after she had gone missing for four months.

In 2002 the property was acquired by the Indigenous Land Corporation with the title holders being the Wilyakali Aboriginal Corporation when the property occupied an area of 507 square kilometres (196 sq mi).

== See also ==
- List of ranches and stations
