= Museum of Somerset =

Museum in Taunton, Somerset

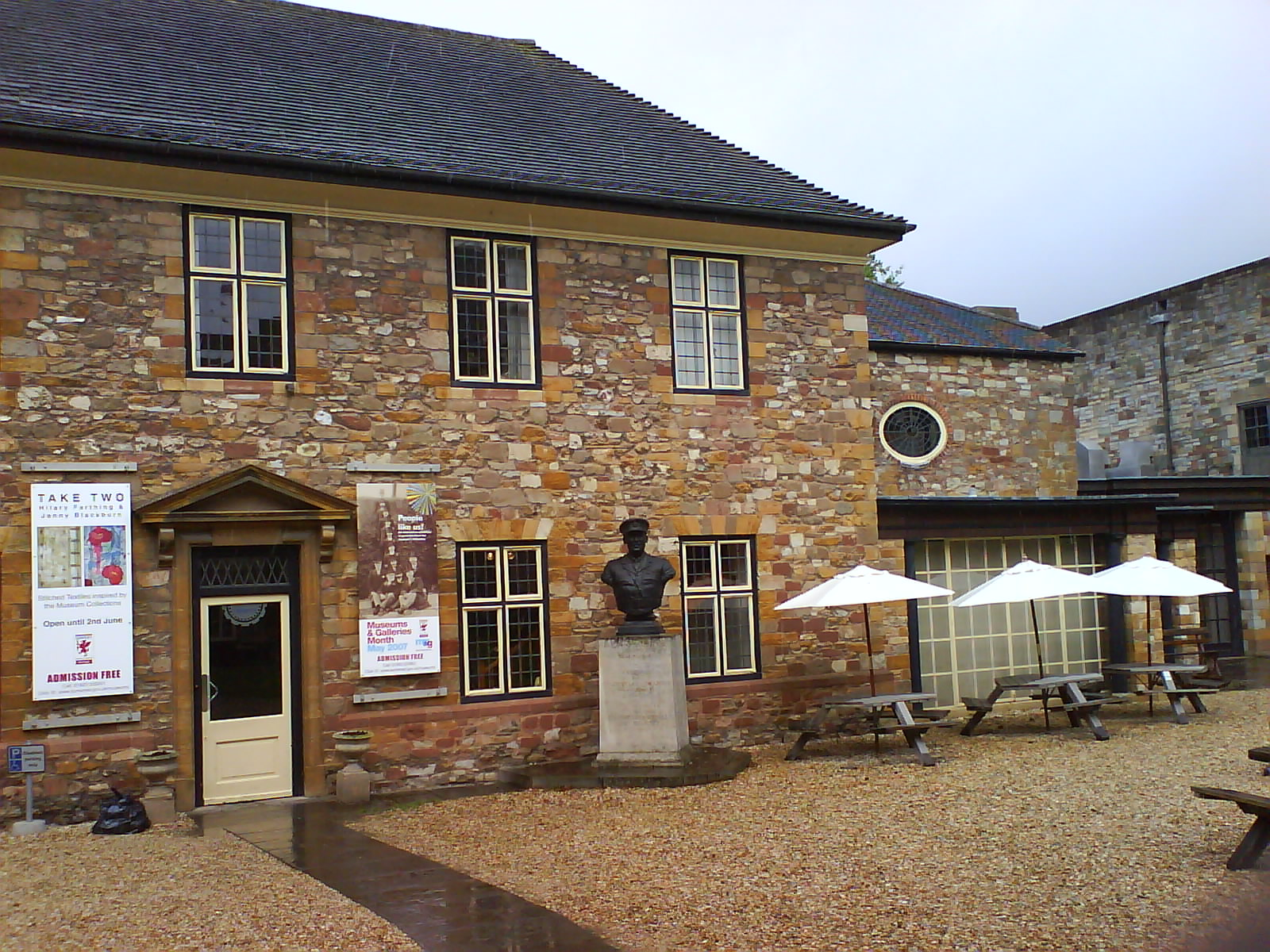

- Location within Somerset and the United Kingdom
- Location: Taunton, Somerset
- Coordinates: 51°00′57″N 3°6′18″W
- Website: swheritage.org.uk/museum-of-somerset

The Museum of Somerset is located in the 12th-century great hall of Taunton Castle, in Taunton in the county of Somerset, England. The museum is run by South West Heritage Trust, an independent charity, and includes objects initially collected by the Somerset Archaeological and Natural History Society who own the castle.

Until 2008 the museum was known as the Somerset County Museum. Heritage Lottery Fund support was obtained to improve the museum, and the new museum reopened at the end of September 2011.

Exhibits include the Frome Hoard, the Low Ham Roman Mosaic, the bronze-age South Cadbury shield and a range of other objects relating to the history of the county. The collections also includes material collected by self-taught archaeologist Mary Harfield.

== History ==
In 1874 the castle was bought by the Somerset Archaeological and Natural History Society and between 1899 and 1900 the Great Hall was repaired and refitted as their chief museum space. In 1908-9 the Adam Library was created to house the society's growing collection of books. The society now leases it to Somerset County Council to house the Museum of Somerset. A substantial proportion of the items held by the Museum were originally collected by the Society.

Queen Elizabeth II, accompanied by the Duke of Edinburgh, visited the museum on 8 May 1987.

In October 2007, plans for a £6.5 million improvement to the museum and the castle were submitted by Somerset County Council to the Heritage Lottery Fund. It closed to the public on 18 April 2008 for a two-year refit, and reopened as the Museum of Somerset on 29 September 2011. Central to the new museum is the Tree of Somerset, a sculpture carved from oak from the Quantock Hills, which depicts events from Somerset's history.

== Exhibits ==
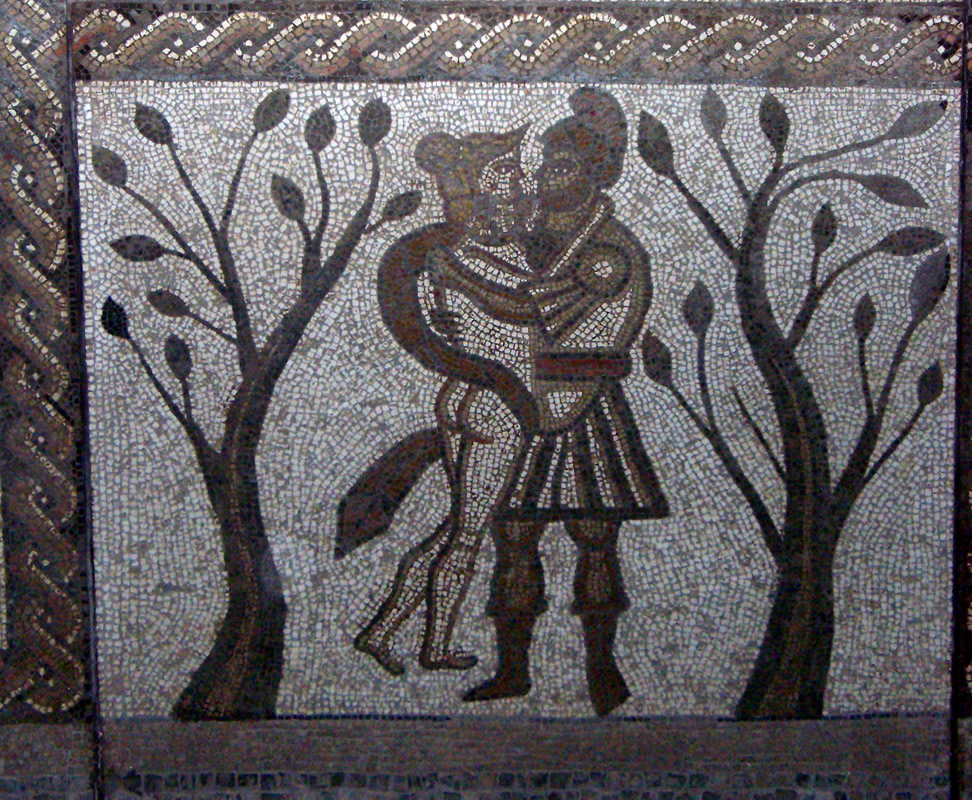
One of the five panels in the mosaic from Low Ham Roman Villa. This panel depicts Dido and Aeneas.

The museum hosts a collection of toys and dolls, sculpture, natural history, fossils, fine silver, remains of pottery, and it also contains a collection of archaeological items, including the mosaic found at the Low Ham Roman Villa. Also included is the Somerset Military Museum where visitors are enabled to follow the fortunes of the Somerset Light Infantry as they carried out their campaigns across the world.

Exhibits include the Frome Hoard, a hoard of 52,503 Roman coins found in April 2010 by metal detectorist Dave Crisp near the town of Frome. The coins were contained in a ceramic pot 45 cm (18 in) in diameter, and date from AD 253 to 305. Most of the coins are made from debased silver or bronze. The hoard is one of the largest ever found in Britain, and is also important as it contains the largest group ever found of coins issued during the reign of Carausius, who ruled Britain independently from 286 to 293 and was the first Roman emperor to strike coins in Britain. The Museum of Somerset acquired the hoard in 2011, using a grant from the National Heritage Memorial Fund.
