= Corona Station =

Corona Station or Corona station may refer to:

- Corona Station (pastoral lease), a pastoral lease in Australia
- Corona station (Edmonton), a light rail transit station in Canada
- Corona station (LIRR), a station stop on the Long Island Rail Road in the United States

== See also ==
- Corona (disambiguation)
