= Frome Hoard =

Hoard of Roman coins found in Somerset, UK

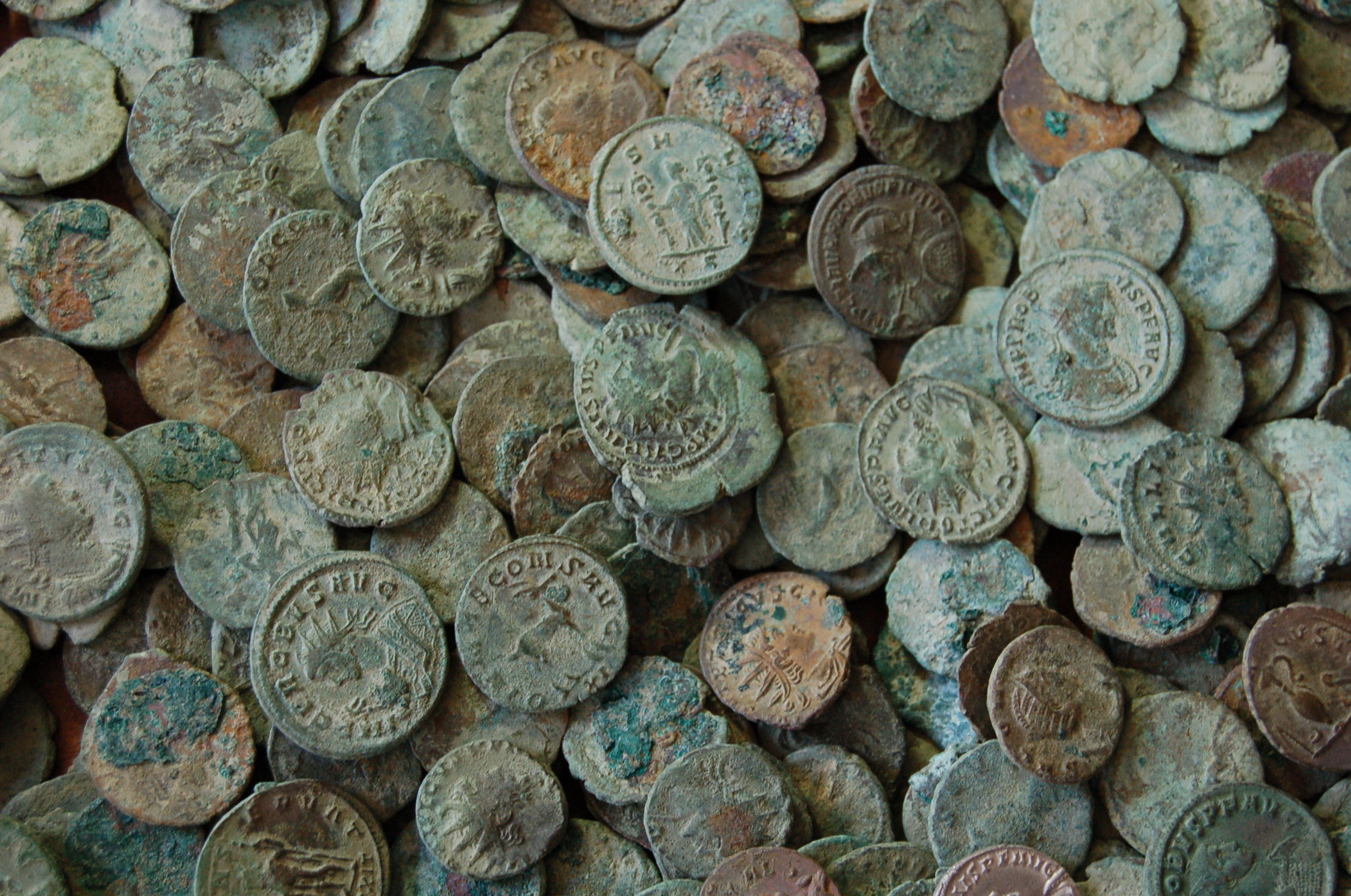
- Coins from the hoard
- Material: Silver and bronze coins
- Size: 52,503 coins
- Created: early 4th century
- Period/culture: Romano-British
- Discovered: April 2010; Near Frome, Somerset, 51.228°N 2.282°W
- Discovered by: Dave Crisp
- Present location: Museum of Somerset, Taunton, England

The Frome Hoard is a hoard of 52,503 Roman coins found in April 2010, by metal detectorist Dave Crisp near Frome in Somerset, England. The coins were contained in a ceramic pot 45 cm (18 in) in diameter, and date from AD 253 to 305. Most of the coins are made from debased silver or bronze. The hoard is one of the largest ever found in Britain, and is also important as it contains the largest group ever found of coins issued during the reign of Carausius (who ruled Britain independently from 286 to 293, and was the first Roman Emperor to strike coins in Britain). The Museum of Somerset in Taunton, using a grant from the National Heritage Memorial Fund (NHMF), acquired the hoard in 2011 for a value of £320,250.

== Discovery and excavation ==
=== Discovery ===
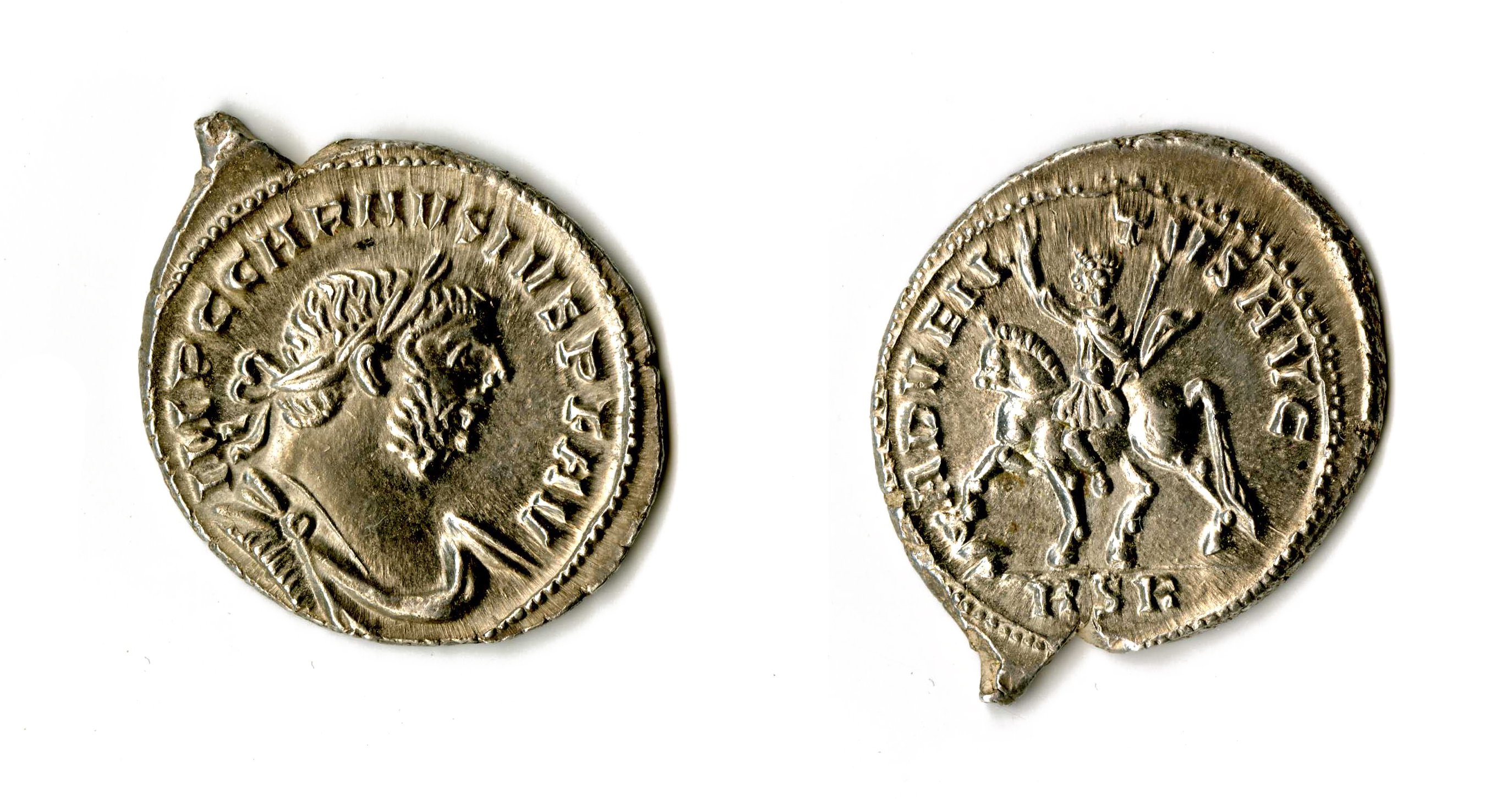
Silver denarius of Carausius Adventus

The hoard was discovered on 11 April 2010 while Crisp was metal detecting in a field near Frome where he had previously found late Roman silver coins. The late Roman coins, eventually totalling 62, were probably the remnants of a scattered hoard, 111 of which had been found on the same farm in 1867. Whilst searching for more coins from the scattered hoard he received what he called a "funny signal" and on digging down about 35 cm (14 in) he found a small radiate coin, and the top of a small pot. Realising that this must be an intact coin hoard he stopped digging and filled in the hole he had made. In 22 years of detecting Crisp had never made such a significant find.

Section drawing of the pot in situ, showing the pit in which the pot was placed, the smaller pot used to form a lid over the mouth of the larger pot, the organic matter and the small hole dug by Crisp.

=== Excavation ===
On 15 April, Crisp notified Katie Hinds, the Portable Antiquities Scheme Finds Liaison Officer for Wiltshire, that he had found the hoard of coins. On 22 April Hinds, together with Anna Booth (Finds Liaison Officer for Somerset) and Alan Graham—an independent archaeologist contracted by Somerset County Council—visited the site to carry out an emergency excavation. The excavation, led by Graham and assisted by Hinds, Booth, Crisp and members of the landowner's family, was performed over three days, from 23 to 25 April.

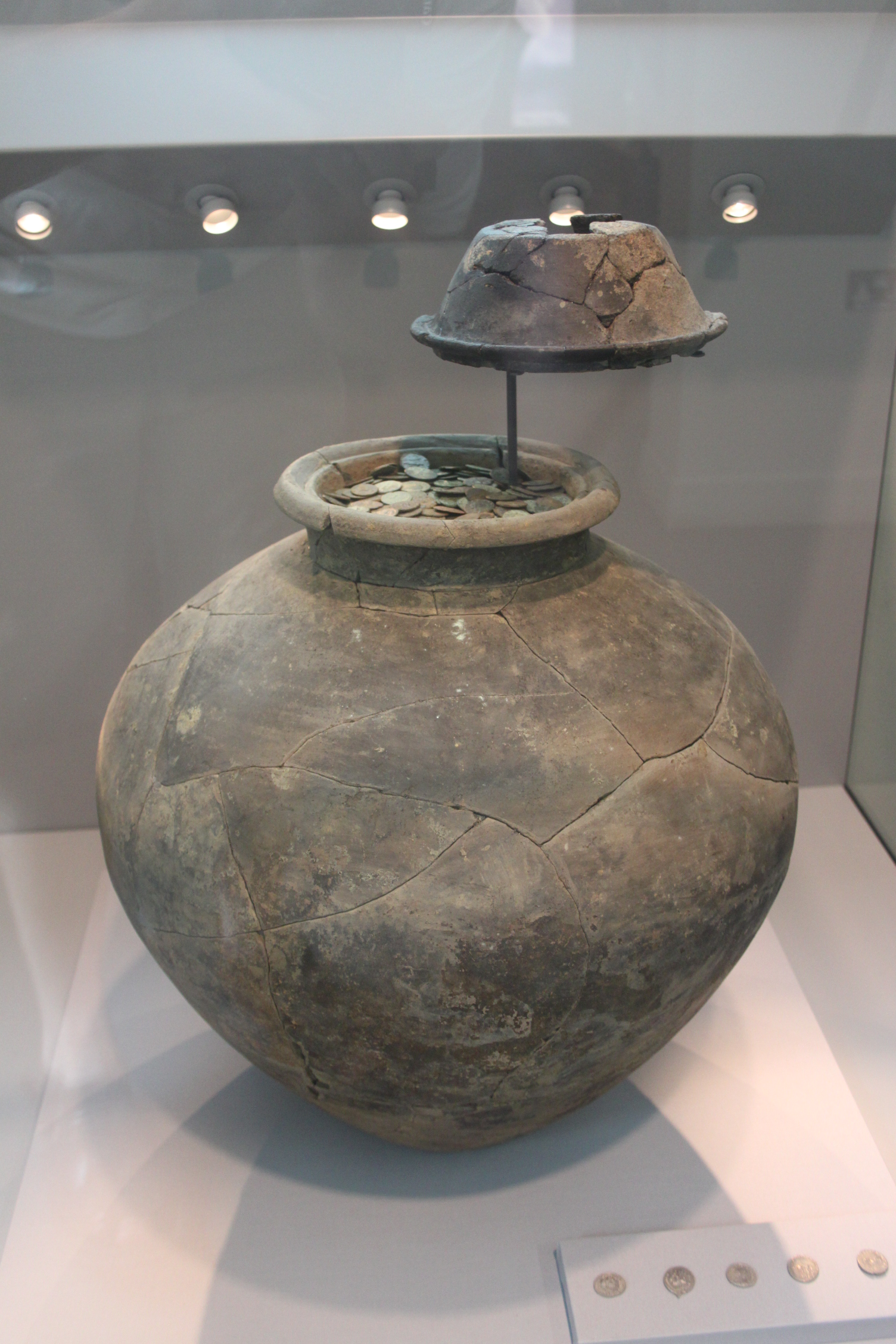
The Frome Hoard at the Museum of Somerset in Taunton Castle

Graham initially excavated a 1.5 metres (4.9 ft) trench around the small hole that Crisp had dug, and identified the pit in which the pot had been deposited. A small black-burnished ware bowl had been inverted over the mouth of the larger pot, to form a lid. First he excavated the pit fill around the exterior of the pot, identifying organic matter which might represent packing material to protect it, and determined that the pot had been broken in situ long before its discovery in 2010. He then excavated the pot itself. Due to the weight of the contents, the need for speedy excavation due to security concerns and the difficulty in lifting the broken pot with the contents still inside—which would be the preferred archaeological method, so that the contents could be excavated in controlled, laboratory conditions—the decision was taken to excavate the coins in the field. The coins were removed in layers (Note: The Portable Antiquities Scheme blog states that there were 12 layers, but the section drawing of the pot shows only 10 layers.), by which method it was hoped to determine if there was any chronological pattern in the deposition of the coins; that is, whether the earliest coins were at the bottom and latest coins at the top. The coins were collected in 66 labelled bags, and in total weighed approximately 160 kg (350 lb). Graham excavated and recorded the finds, and the others bagged the coins as Graham lifted them out.

Given the weight of the coins and the relatively thin walls of the pot, it is thought that it would not have been possible to carry the filled pot to the site: the pot would probably have been buried in the ground first, then the coins were poured in before it was sealed and covered over.

After the hoard had been lifted, an archaeological geophysics team was contracted to investigate the area around the hoard but failed to find any evidence of settlement.

=== Conservation ===
On 26 April, Sam Moorhead, Finds Advisor for Iron Age and Roman coins at the British Museum, and Roger Bland, Head of the Department of Portable Antiquities and Treasure at the British Museum, drove to Frome to collect the excavated coins, and drove them back to the British Museum in London. Over the next six weeks Metals Conservator Pippa Pearce washed and dried all the coins in order to stabilise them, but did not perform a full conservation, which would have cost an additional £35,000.

== Items discovered ==
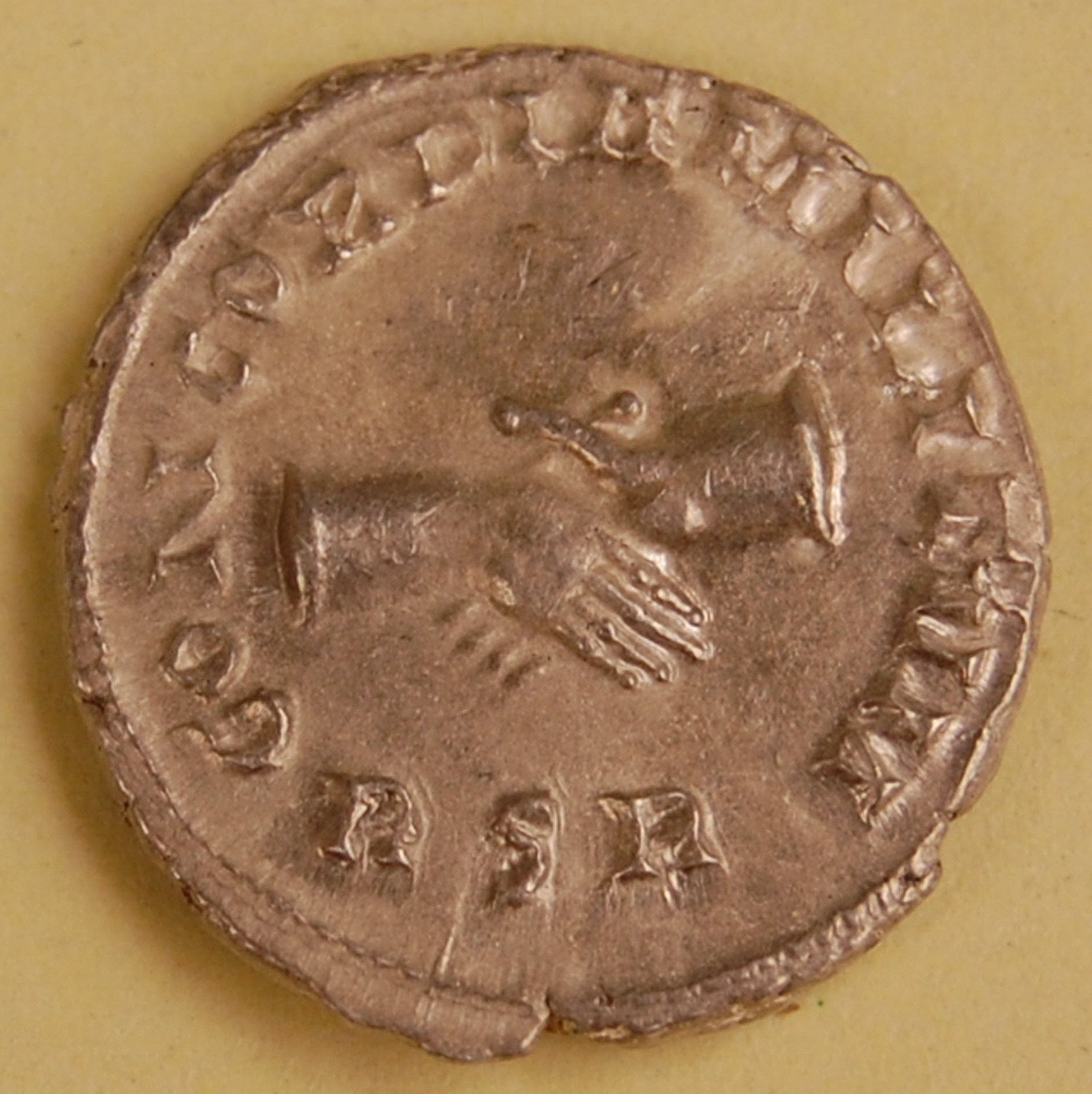
Reverse of a Carausius silver denarius from the Hoard, showing two clasped hands (symbolising the unity of the ruler and the army), alongside the abbreviation 'RSR'. This alludes to a line from Virgil's Eclogues - Redeunt Saturnia Regna or "The Golden Ages have returned".

The coins comprise 67 separate types, and date from the period 253 to 305. The vast majority of coins are made from bronze, but five are made from solid silver.

Of the 52,503 coins found, 44,245 have been identified, and the remainder are classified provisionally as "illegible" until cleaning and conservation has been completed. Of the identifiable coins, 14,788 were minted under the central Roman Empire, 28,377 were minted under the breakaway Gallic Empire, and 766 were minted under the Britannic Empire of Carausius, as shown in the table below. About 5% of the coins identified so far are from the period of Carausius, who ruled Britain from 286 to 293, and the hoard includes five silver denarii issued by Carausius, which were the only type of silver coin to be struck anywhere in the Roman Empire at that time.

Table of coins
Reign	Date	Number of coins	Empire
Valerian & Gallienus (joint reign)	253–260	46	Central Empire
Gallienus (sole reign)	260–268	6,091	Central Empire
Salonina (wife of Gallienus)	260–268	404	Central Empire
Claudius II	268–270	5,421	Central Empire
Divus Claudius	270–271	1,227	Central Empire
Quintillus	270	333	Central Empire
Aurelian	270–275	266	Central Empire
Severina (wife of Aurelian)	270–275	13	Central Empire
Tacitus	275–276	252	Central Empire
Florian	276	10	Central Empire
Probus	276–282	619	Central Empire
Carus	282–283	8	Central Empire
Divus Carus	283	5	Central Empire
Magnia Urbica (wife of Carus)	282–283	2	Central Empire
Carinus	282–285	19	Central Empire
Numerian	283–284	12	Central Empire
Diocletian	285–305	38	Central Empire
Maximian	286–305	22	Central Empire
Postumus	260–269	257	Gallic Empire
Laelian	269	4	Gallic Empire
Marius	269	35	Gallic Empire
Victorinus	269–271	7,494	Gallic Empire
Divus Victorinus	271	14	Gallic Empire
Tetricus I	271–274	12,416	Gallic Empire
Tetricus II	272–274	5,203	Gallic Empire
Uncertain		2,954	Gallic Empire
Carausius	286–293	766	British Empire

== Purpose ==
Most Roman coin hoards are traditionally believed to have been buried by their owners for safe-keeping, with the intention of being eventually recovered, but Sam Moorhead of the Portable Antiquities Scheme suggests that in this case the pot was so large and fragile that it could not have been easily recovered without breaking it, and so the hoard may represent communal votive offerings to the gods.

== Inquest and valuation ==
A coroner's treasure inquest was held on 22 July 2010. The inquest declared that the coins were treasure, and hence property of the Crown. However, under the terms of the 1996 Treasure Act, a museum may purchase the hoard at an officially-determined price, with half of the proceeds going to the finder and half to the landowner. Somerset County Council Heritage Service indicated that it wished to acquire the hoard, and to put the coins on display in the new Museum of Somerset in Taunton when it re-opened in 2011.

In October 2010, the hoard was valued by the Treasure Valuation Committee at £320,250, and a public appeal was launched by the Art Fund. The Art Fund itself provided an initial £40,250, while the British Museum donated 50p for each copy sold of its book on the hoard (see Further Reading, below). Ultimately, with the help of a grant from the National Heritage Memorial Fund, including £105,000 for conservation work, the Museum of Somerset in Taunton acquired the hoard in 2011.

== Display ==
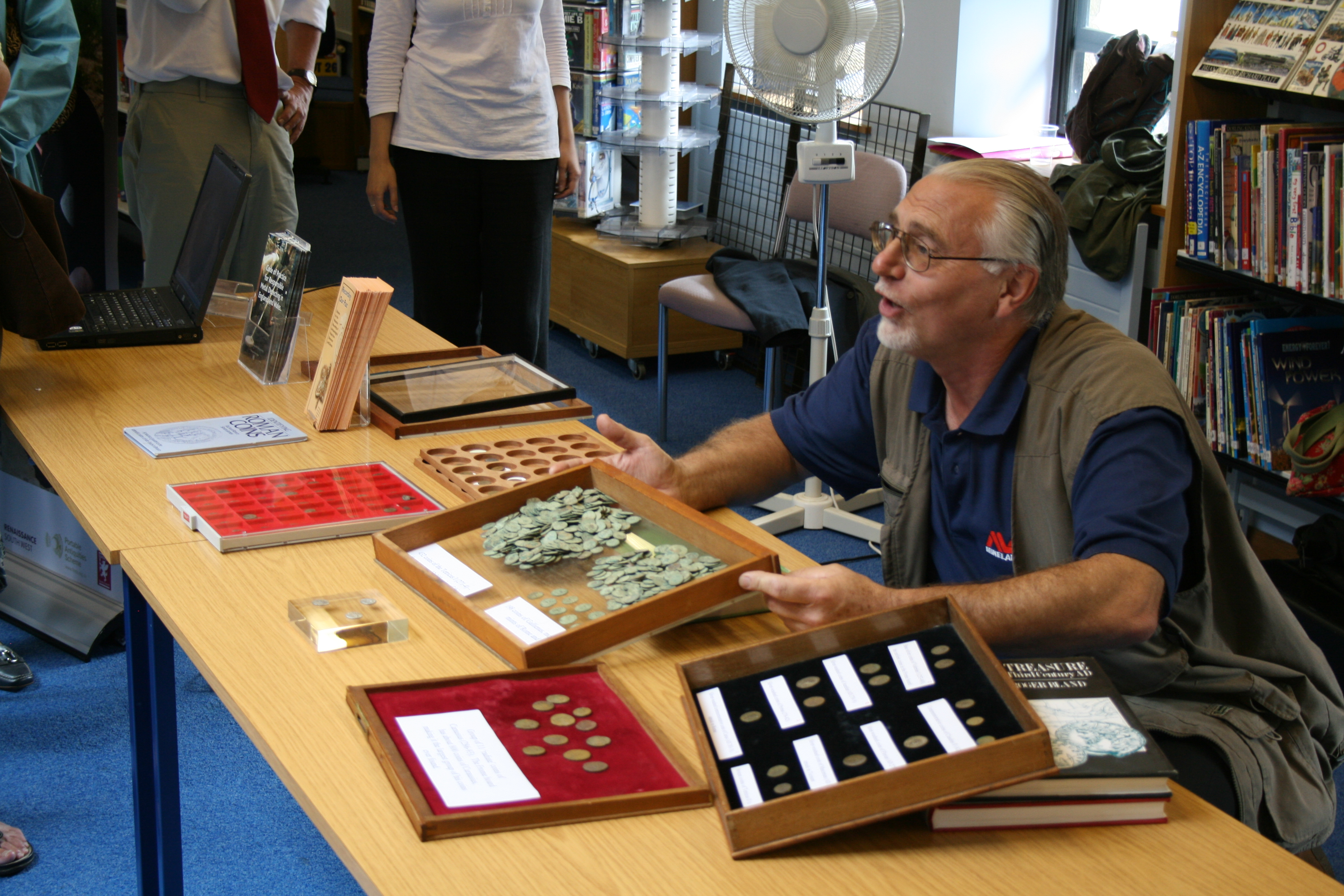
Dave Crisp at Frome Library on 22 July 2010, holding a tray of coins from his find

A selection of the coins were initially on display at the British Museum on 8 July 2010 for a press photocall, and the entire hoard was subsequently displayed at the British Museum between 15 July and 31 August 2010. Some of the coins were exhibited at Frome Library on 22 July 2010, and again on 23 October 2010.

The find was included as part of a BBC Two television programme, Digging for Britain, presented by Alice Roberts in August 2010.

The hoard was put on permanent display at the Museum of Somerset when it reopened on 29 September 2011.

== See also ==
- List of hoards in Great Britain
- Roman currency
