= Low Ham Roman Villa =

Coordinates: 51°03′26″N 02°48′19″W

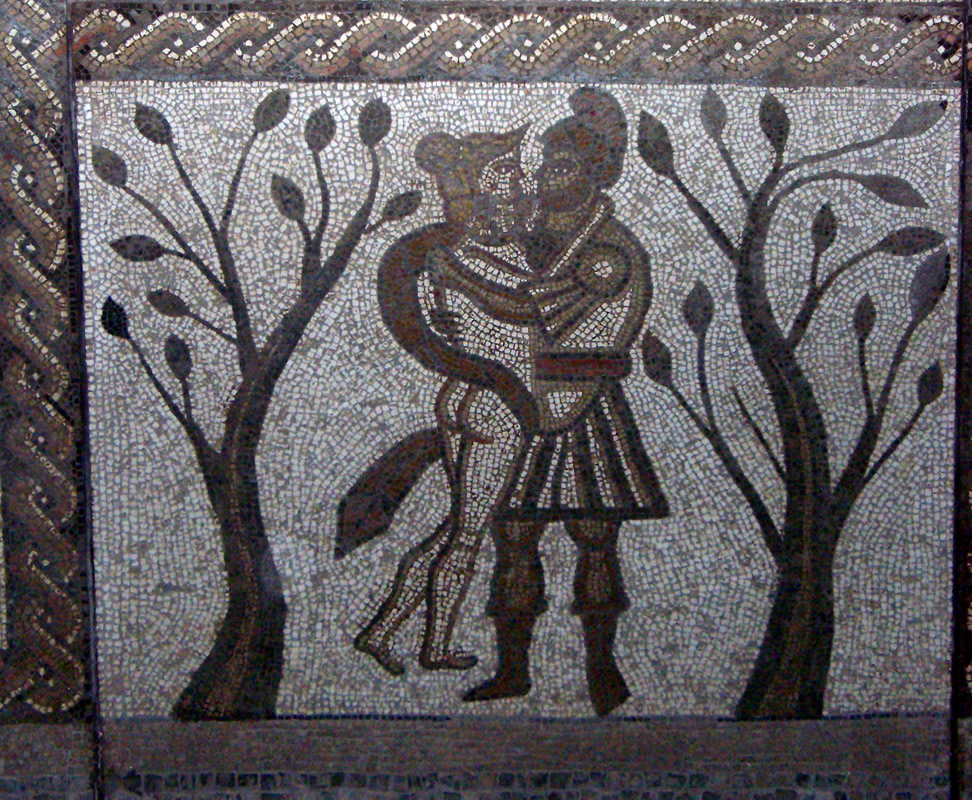
Aeneas and Dido on the mosaic

The Low Ham Roman Villa was a Roman courtyard villa located near Low Ham in the civil parish of High Ham in the English county of Somerset. It is best known for the extraordinary figured mosaic depicting the story of Aeneas and Dido.

The site is a scheduled ancient monument. It has been placed on the Heritage at Risk Register due to the risks from extensive animal burrowing.

== Discovery ==
The villa was discovered by a local farmer, Herbert Cook, in 1938, whilst digging a hole to bury a dead sheep. Protected from deep ploughing during World War II, it was excavated from 1946 to 1955 by H. S. L. Dewar and C. A. Ralegh Radford.

== Villa ==
The villa appears to have been constructed around AD 340 on a gentle slope facing north-east, only about a mile from other villas at High Ham and Pitney. Aerial photography has shown that there are a number of farm buildings around a large courtyard, although the excavations concentrated on the residential west wing and bath house. The baths were particularly impressive. They featured the usual suite of rooms with a deep cold plunge bath and beautiful mosaic floor along its approach.

== Mosaic floor ==
The large 14-foot (4.3m) square mosaic from the floor of the frigidarium depicts the story of Aeneas and Dido, as told in the 1st century BC by the Roman poet, Virgil. Like the villa, it dates to the mid-4th century. The Low Ham mosaic is unique in Roman Britain in providing a narrative story in five panels. First is a scene of Aeneas sailing to Carthage, with Achates lifting from a ship the crown described as a gift to Dido in Aeneid Book I. The next shows Aeneas meeting Dido, with his son Ascanius and his mother Venus. There follow scenes of the couple out hunting, of the couple embracing, and either of Venus, or else of Dido left alone after Aeneas' departure. It is the earliest piece of narrative art in the country. It was lifted in 1953 and is now on display in the Museum of Somerset.
