= St Andrew's Church, High Ham =

Church in Somerset, England

Church of Saint Andrew
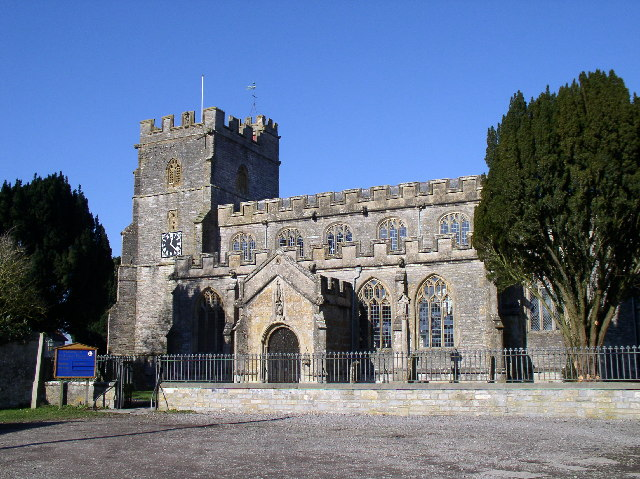

- Location within Somerset
- 51°04′35″N 2°49′18″W
- Location: High Ham, Somerset, England

History
- Built: 1476

Listed Building – Grade I
- Designated: 17 April 1959
- Reference no.: 1227591

The Church of Saint Andrew is an Anglican parish church located on Turnhill Road, in High Ham, Somerset, England. It shows evidence of 12th- and 14th-century building and was largely rebuilt in 1476. On 17 April 1959, it was designated as a Grade I listed building.

== History ==
The church is built in the Perpendicular style. The date 1474 is recorded in an inscription on the tomb of the rector who re-built it. The rebuilding of the church in 1476 took about one year, and was performed under John Selwood, then Abbot of Glaston, who was also the patron and donor of the rectory. The rector John Dyer built the present chancel in 1476.

The rector Adrian Schall wrote a memoir about the church in 1598. Some 19th-century restoration work was done by John Norton.

== Architecture ==
=== Structure ===
The design is a four-cell plan with a three-bay chancel, and five-bay nave. There are north and south aisles, a south porch, and a west tower. Building materials include local lias stone and hamstone. The main roofs are composed of Welsh slate with moulded coped gables, battlemented parapets. The aisle and porch roofs are of sheet lead.

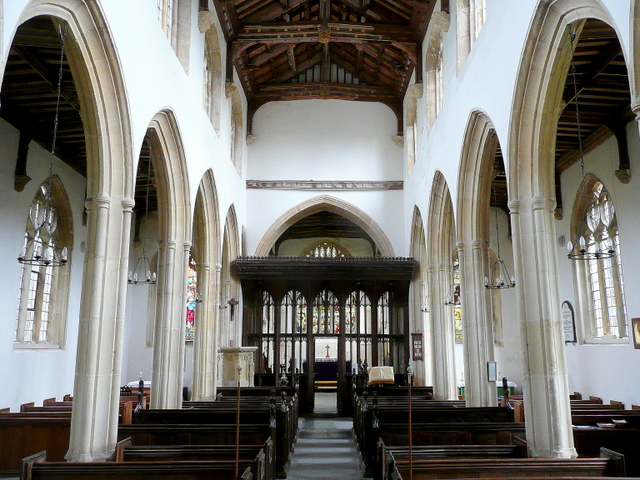
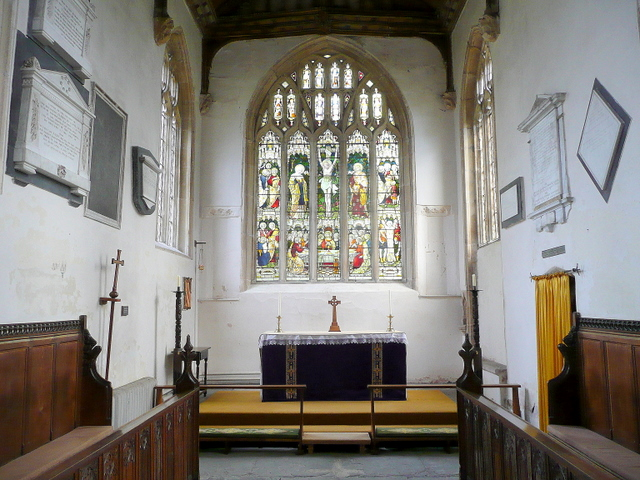
Interior

The tower dates from the early 14th century, and is in three stages. It is squat with triple plinth bands, parapets, corner gargoyles, angled and straight buttresses.

The chancel was built in 1499. It has a double plinth course, gargoyles, parapets, coped gables, and angled buttresses. Each buttress had an east window of five-light panes; the north and south sections had three-light windows. The chancel was built with a moulded king post truss roof and many rosettes, angels and other carvings. The wide panelled chancel arch has a well preserved Devon-style timber screen.

The north aisle has similar features as the chancel with double plinth eaves course, gargoyles, battlements, buttresses, and three-light windows of standard tracery in hollowed pointed-arched recesses. The nave dates from 1476; it is visible as a clerestorey and includes three-light windows. 15th-century stained glass fragments are found in the east window tracery, and there are also late-17th-century windows resembling those of Low Ham Church. There is a small, almost triangular, arched, moulded doorway, an arched chamfered doorway, and a near semi-circular arched doorway with 19th-century wrought iron gates. Other features of note include a canopied statue niche with a 19th-century figure and an empty statue niches along the east wall.

=== Fittings and furniture ===
Choir stalls are of the 15th century, as are many of the pew bench ends. The pulpit and lectern are also of the 19th century. There is a canopied stoup, and a 12th-century lead-lined tulip bowl font on a stem with rope moulding. The church has five bells cast in ca.1500, 1641, 1763, 1795, and 1877. A brass engraving in the chancel floor is dedicated to the rector John Dyer (died 1499) who paid for the rebuilding of the chancel.

== Churchyard ==
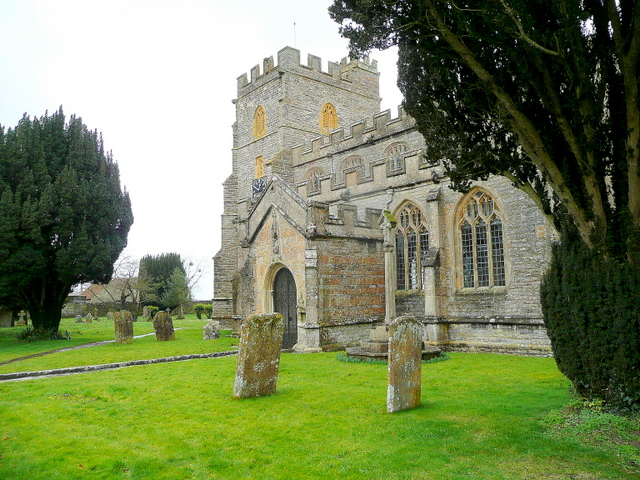
Churchyard

There are several Grade II listed structures, enlisted 7 February 1986, in and by the churchyard. The Gillet Monument is a late-18th-century altar tomb with an obelisk made of hamstone and it is located in the churchyard, 17 m (56 ft) southwest of the tower. The Swain Travers Monument is also located in the churchyard, just east of the chancel; it is a 19th-century chest tomb, a possibly reuse of an 18th-century tomb. An unidentified late-17th-century monument in the churchyard is located just south of the chancel.

Adding to the setting of the churchyard which it abuts is a portion of the east boundary wall, to Ham Court, 15 m (49 ft) south of the church. Also historically important is the section of the south boundary wall with railings, 15 m (49 ft) south of the church, with cast iron railings and patterned with cross/Fleur-de-lis caps.

== See also ==
- List of Grade I listed buildings in South Somerset
- List of towers in Somerset
- List of ecclesiastical parishes in the Diocese of Bath and Wells
