= Matilda Wallace =

Australian pioneer and biographer (born 1838)

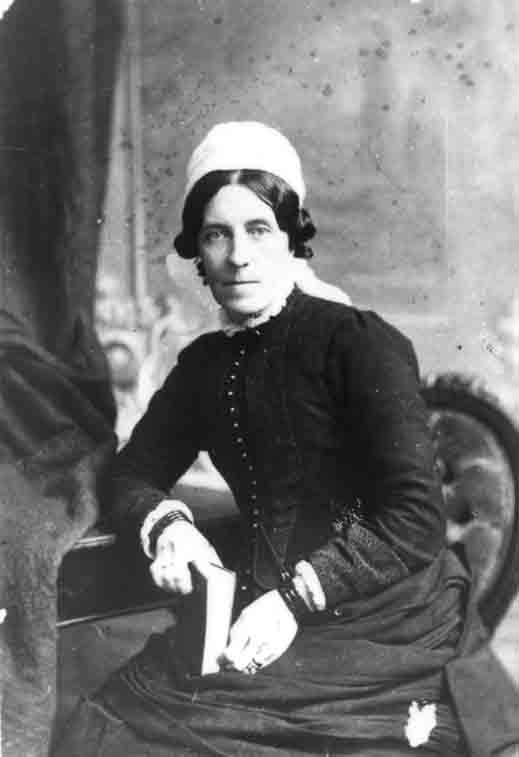
- Wallace c. 1880
- Born: Matilda Hill; November 1838; High Ham, Somerset, England
- Died: 21 January 1898 (aged 59)

Matilda Wallace (November 1838 – 21 January 1898) was a 19th-century pioneer Australian pastoralist. Born in High Ham, Somerset, England to Sarah and George Hill. She emigrated to Australia departing Liverpool on 31 October 1858, joining members of her family in Coromandel Valley, in the Colony of South Australia. She was a twenty-year old (dairy maid) sponsored by brother, Robert Hill. Wallace and her husband Abraham were for many years frontier sheep and cattle farmers, which she documented in a memoir. Her account provides a view into the place of women in society at the time, the hardships of frontier settlers and their interactions with Indigenous people.

== Her early life and journey to Australia ==
Matilda Hill's family lived in the hamlet of Henley in the Parish of High Ham, Somerset. George Hill married Sarah Meaker on 13 January 1827 at St Andrews Church, High Ham. They had five children, the youngest being Matilda. Matilda was baptised in St Andrew's Church of England at High Ham on 11 November 1838 a short time after her birth. She attended the village school attached to St Andrew's Church until the age of 11 and, at the age of 12, she was employed as a glove maker, or glover. When Matilda emigrated, she was described on the passenger list as a dairy maid.

At the time young people from rural Somerset were affected by substantial poverty and a reduction in the need for farm labourers. Many were destined for Australasia as was the case for members of Matilda's family.

Three of Matilda's siblings, Mary, Robert and Jeffrey, emigrated to the Colony of South Australia and she decided to follow them. Matilda's sister, Mary Elliot Hill, married Samuel Bartlett.They emigrated on the ship Himalaya on 1 August 1849 from Southampton. They settled at St Mary's Coromandel Valley in the Adelaide Hills.Samuel's brother, James Bartlett, married Elizabeth Culiford emigrated and arrived on the Sultana on 7 October 1852 from Plymouth. Matilda's brother, Robert Hill, married and travelled on the Nimrod, arriving in February 1856 In 1857 Matilda's other brother, Jeffrey Hill, and his wife Mary 23 sailed from Liverpool on the Tantivy to join them. The men worked on the land. In 1874 Robert was described as a market gardener at Scott's Creek.

As a nominated emigrant, Matilda's passage in steerage on the ship, North, was subsidised. Subsidies were used to encourage migrants and thus provide much needed labour. For steerage passengers, life aboard ship, was characterised by poor hygiene and a lack of privacy for ablutions with limited access to fresh water and toilet facilities. Washing facilities were also communal and basic. During severe storms in the Southern Ocean passengers were confined below, sometimes for days, sick and tossed around, often in complete darkness, and fearing for their lives, as water swept across the decks.

The barque North departed from Liverpool on 1 November 1858 and arrived in Adelaide on 28 January 1859. The 1,238 tons North carried a full complement of 417 passengers, including 51 young married couples with 34 boys and 49 girls including 15 babies, five of whom were born on ship, 74 single men, 156 single women. Matilda was fortunate as passengers were generally satisfied 'with the conduct of officers and crew, as well as the quality and quantity of provisions served out.'

== Early years in Australia ==
When Matilda Elliot Hill arrived in Port Adelaide on 28 January 1859 she was met by her brother, Robert, and travelled via Adelaide to Coromandel Valley to meet her sister Mary, brother-in-law Samuel, and her nieces, Ann Matilda and Mary Elliot. She stayed with her sister Mary and brother Robert. She later recalled: "I had made up my mind on leaving 'home' to make the best of everything, so now was the time to begin. I need not tell you how thankful I was for my bed, for when you think of it, walking, railway journey, coaching, and lastly riding 20 miles, was not so bad on the day of arrival, after three months cooped up on board ship. My waking thoughts were varied, and scenery I beheld on rising was most charming; and after a very hearty breakfast, two of my little nieces took me for a stroll, during which I came to the conclusion that life in Australia could be endured." Matilda later reflected on her arrival in the colony: 'I, then a girl of twenty-one, having left my native land (Somersetshire), father and mother. What for? I used often to ask myself'.

While in Coromandel Valley, Matilda became acquainted with Australian farming and travelled around the colony for about two and a half years staying with friends and relations in almost every inhabited part of South Australia and finally settled in Mt Gambier in early 1861, where she met her future husband Abraham Wallace who had arrived in Australia on 24 November 1850 on the Joseph Somes from Plymouth.

Abraham first settled at Mt Gambier but went to the Victorian goldfields, where he engaged in hawking goods. He returned to the Southeast where he met Matilda. Matilda and Abraham were married on 9 December 1861. The couple stayed in Mt Gambier for 18 months. During that time Matilda helped in the Wallace's shop and the couple's first child, a boy, died.

The couple left for Queensland equipped with a waggon and pair of horses, bedding and provisions. They travelled up the Darling River to Mount Murcheson. Matilda wrote: "I not being strong enough to travel, we stayed here and opened a store. After sending to Adelaide for goods, my husband then applied to the New South Wales Government for land to purchase; in four months' time we received an answer that we could buy land, and that a surveyor had instructions to survey it, in the meantime my husband put up a house 28 by 18, divided into two rooms, in which we had to pack our stores as well as ourselves, but as the surveyor never made his appearance, of course we could not open a store. My husband got discontented having nothing to do, and started hawking to dispose of his goods." Matilda was still unwell when Abraham left her to dispose of the stock. The second child, a boy, of the marriage was born here but did not survive.""Upon his wife's recovery, Mr Wallace left her alone again for another month, and at the end of that period decided that hawking was not his forte, and that he would continue the journey to Queensland. The remaining stores were sold to a pioneer from the Paroo, and the waggon was headed into Queensland. After having travelled 200 miles beyond the border it was learned that the government would not allow stock to cross from any other colony, and so a return was made to Mount Murchison.On his return it was resolved to proceed to Adelaide via the Barrier Ranges.This was breaking new ground, and everybody at Menindie said the Wallaces were mad to face the perils involved."

However, they did get through, risking death from thirst on what would have been a hot dry journey to Mingary, 80 miles over the South Australian border. From there pushed on to Adelaide. Late in 1863, they returned with 25 horses, 1,400 sheep, 18 months' provisions, and two men in order to settle on some country on the other side of the ranges, travelling via Boolcoomatta Station. From there they probably went north along the border area between the colonies of South Australia and New South Wales, crossing the Barrier Ranges near Byjerkerno in early January 1864.Local Aborigines showed them a waterhole in the creek where they camped. The Wallaces were on land to the north east of Boolcoomatta and became squatters. They were now at the remote front of European settlement in a locality named Sturt's Meadows in honour of Sturt's 1844-5 journey in which he followed the Darling River to the point that gave the shortest plains crossing to the southern end of the Barrier Range.

== Becoming settlers ==
Once the Wallaces had decided to settle, they entered a nomadic phase, shepherding their sheep throughout the Fowlers Gap area to meet their need for water and feed. Early properties were not fenced, and it was the job of the shepherds to prevent stock from wandering, being lost and ensuring they were safe and had adequate shade, food and water. Finding water was often difficult in arid areas of the Barrier region. The Wallaces were often helped in shepherding by Aboriginal people as they moved from one place to another.

The first station in the Barrier region was Mt Gipps, established around 1865, followed shortly after by Poolamacca Station and then Sturt's Meadows The latter property was formally leased in September 1869 and the prior occupant, squatter George Raines, displaced. He was a landless bushman who roamed about with his stock, squatting on the unfenced runs wherever he found good feed. Within 'ten years the property had increased to an area of, about 251,000 acres (102,000 ha).'

Matilda managed the property independently during her husband's frequent absences, relying on Aboriginal people, men as stockmen and women for home help, to source local food and as midwives. At Sturt's Meadow, Matilda had more contact with Aboriginal people than Europeans. Fortunately, some of the Indigenous people she met "could speak English and understand it. I, of course, then was perfectly ignorant of their 'lingo'". Over time, Matilda becomes familiar with terms such as "mob" to refer to a group of Aboriginal people, "lubra" to refer to a girl or woman, and "wadie" ("waddy"), a multi-purpose wooden club. She could understand what was said, for example, "Bel more pull away allabout yarra man tumble down", she interpreted as meaning "the country was so rough we could go no further".

The environment at Sturt's Meadows as depicted in her memoir, contrasted with the green and well-watered pastures of Somerset. Flies, mosquitoes, rats, loneliness, isolation and shortages of water and fodder for stock were a constant battle. Some hardships were minor and short-lived.

Grazing had a significant impact on creeks, soaks, and waterholes as a result of extensive trampling and fouling by stock. Matilda reported facing many other challenges including extreme heat, droughts, plagues of rabbits and rats, dust storms and floods.’

The Darling River largely flows through plains and relatively flat land, having an average gradient of just 16 mm per kilometre. After significant rainfalls it becomes flooded, and the floodwaters recede slowly. Matilda describes a downpour in which they lost most of their sheep as they did not move them to higher ground. At another time their home overlooking Eight Mile Creek was flooded, so they built a new one on higher ground. At Sturt’s Meadows, Matilda was often left on her own to manage the sheep, horses, and staff. At one time she and Abraham were entrusted to protect a number of Aboriginal women from men from another tribe at the request of their husbands. After the women were guarded overnight ‘the Murray blacks went away next morning and the husbands returned and performed Corrobborees for some days after’ to express their thanks.

== Wool ==
In the early days of sheep farming in Australia, 'shearing was done out in the open which is less than ideal. As their sheep numbers increased, the Wallaces needed a woolshed to provide a better environment for both the sheep and the shearers. Corrugated iron was used extensively for constructing woolsheds in Australia from the mid 19th century due to its strength, light weight, and cost and was a crucial material in the expansion of the wool industry, especially in frontier regions.

Each year shearers came to Sturt's Meadows to shear the sheep by blade. When Abraham was away, Matilda not only fed but also supervised the shearers. At one shearing the menfolk sustained injuries and so Matilda, despite her diminutive stature, ‘shore the last five sheep herself’, a physically demanding task that involves catching and positioning a 40 kg sheep, then skillfully removing its wool using hand shears.

In the Barrier region most stations were leased from the Crown. In 1880 rentals were raised placing the individual squatter without capital at a considerable disadvantage. Many of them left the newly occupied areas in the dry years after 1865, particularly during the period of depressed wool prices from 1868 to 1870. The Wallaces from Sturt's Meadows were among them. In the 1880s large company holdings began consolidating small pastoral runs. Parts of Sturt's Meadows and Cobham Station then became part of what is now Fowler's Gap Station. In 1884 most of western New South Wales was made up of vast Pastoral Holdings, each Holding being divided into runs. Sturt's Meadows Station was divided into four leasehold areas or runs.

The Sydney Morning Herald, Fri 4 November 1870, reported that a parcel of greasy wool had reached a high of 12d/lb or about £32 /bale. In her memoir, Matilda recalled scouring her wool before it was sent for sale. As greasy wool contains as much as 50 percent dirt and other matter, woolgrowers could save on freight by having their wool scoured before being sent for export. By that time Australia had become the world's largest producer of wool. In that year Sturt's Meadows is reputed to have produced in the order of 250 bales. The first river boat travelled up the Darling in 1859.

The wool travelled down the Darling River to Wentworth, at the junction of the Darling and Murray Rivers, and by 1870 Wentworth had become a bustling port with paddle steamers carrying goods to and from towns on the Darling and Murray Rivers and the outside world. In 1895,485 vessels passed through this port. Large barges of wool were often moored at the wharf.

Sheep graziers became prosperous during the 1880s and this period is often called the Golden Age of Wool. Wool became a major export contributing to Australia's economy and helped establish a wealthy class of sheep graziers, built on land which is now considered to have been illegally taken from the Indigenous owners. Prosperous woolgrowers often constructed imposing and architecturally significant station homesteads, many of which are now heritage-listed. These grand residences reflected the immense wealth generated by the colonial wool industry, particularly during the 19th and early 20th centuries. This prosperity was often also reflected in the lives they led. Many residences had ballrooms that were central to the social life of the time and designed for hosting large events, dances, and receptions. Examples of Historic Australian Homesteads include Glengallan Homestead, a significant residence near Warwick. This building is a testament to the wealth and architectural ambitions of the era's graziers.

However, the golden age did not last long in the Fowlers Gap district. Both settlers and governments grossly over estimated the long term stocking capacity. By the 1890s conditions were critical and this led to the Royal Commission of 1901 by New South Wales. The Commission recognised that the region was unsuited for close settlement and made changes to land tenure. The assessed carrying capacity was halved to about a sheep per 10 ha and rents were also lowered.' After Matilda had begun to manage Sturt's Meadows She would have experienced this downturn and had to mortgage her Sturt's Meadows property to the Australian Land and Finance Company' after Abraham died.

== A New Home ==
In 1871 a start was made on substantial homestead above flood level at Sturt's Meadows. The homestead and stock were to be supplied with water from a permanent well sunk on the creek near their original camp, sited with the help of local Aboriginal people. By 1883, a flock of 18,000 sheep occupied the run and, as substantial improvements to the property had been made, it was referred to as a station. Further improvements were made by the time the property was advertised for sale again. A description of Sturt's Meadows in the Barrier Miner on Thursday 27th Nov 1890, p. 2 includes some important details including a realistic estimate of its sheep-carrying capacity. Sturt's Meadows has leasehold area of 109,720 acres, about 54 miles from Broken Hill; loamy soil with slate; level and undulating country; with ranges of stony country running through; gums along water courses; stock on holding, including resumed area, 37,000 sheep; inspector's estimate, 54 acres per sheep; rainfall average for 5 years, 11.46in; water supply afforded by soakage in Caloola Creek, in which two bottomless tanks are sunk to keep back sand, fit to water 5,000 sheep in 24 hours; wells near station afford unlimited supply, and tanks have cubic capacity of 20,000 yards; rabbits numerous on watercourse and thicker than in any place in the district.

== Birth of Annie ==
Matilda was several hours from Menindee, so she gave birth to her four sons at home with the help of Aboriginal midwives, whose care and hygiene she regarded highly. Even so, when she was due to give birth in late 1870, Matilda left home by buggy to go about 150 km to Menindee with her husband. This was one of the few times Matilda left Sturt's Meadows. In her memoir she later wrote: ‘this was the first-time I had seen civilisation in its entirety for seven years.’ Menindee was in fact a small township at that time.

On 28 January 1871, her daughter Mary Ann Sarah Wallace was born at Menindee. After returning home Matilda took her three-week old baby to their old camp. "In the morning my husband said he had something wonderful to show me, and when I went out he pointed out the ground covered' with rat tracks. The rats had passed in thousands during the night, all travelling south... I may mention this rat invasion happened in March, 1871. My husband is now started for Adelaide with some fat sheep, leaving me and my little baby alone. He was to have been away ten weeks; but it's quite three months before he arrives back. In July 1872, I arrived at what was to be my permanent home. We had splendid rains, and a very good supply of good stock water in the new well."

== Later years ==
"After getting my home nicely arranged, in about four months I started with my little daughter for Adelaide, which is the first visit I had paid that city for twelve years." Pregnant again, after having lost five sons, one at Mt Gambier, one on the way to Paroo and three buried at Sturt's Meadows Matiilda travelled to Adelaide late in 1872 for family support, giving birth to Alfred Abey Tom Whitfield Wallace, on 24 January 1873. The name ‘Abey’ was an affectionate name that Matilda called her husband, and Whitfield was the maiden name of Abraham's mother. Both children were baptized at Holy Trinity Church, the first Anglican Church in Adelaide. After her sixth son died in early infancy, she began writing her memoir, "Twelve Years' Life in Australia, from 1859 to 1871". She concluded her memoir: ‘I have now recorded the most stirring incidents of my life in the bush, so I will say good-bye to my readers. She never returned to Sturt's Meadows or to England.

On 21 January 1880, Abraham Wallace set out from Sturt's Meadows for the Northern Territory where he established Elsey Station in 1881. Abraham returned to Sturt's Meadows soon after.

By 1882. Sturt's Meadow Station shore 32,000 sheep, so the Wallaces at last were doing well. However, Abraham Wallace, like all the other pastoralists who ventured into the Territory during the first wave of pastoral settlement, threw it all away in the north. Elsey was small with only about 1,500 cattle and was a marginal business proposition that became a drain on Abraham's finances. The first Elsey Station homestead was built soon after at Warlock Ponds and transported to Red Lily Lagoon in 1909. The lagoon was the site of a massacre after Duncan Campbell, who had been appointed first head stockman in June 1881, was murdered on Elsey Station on 15 July 1882. There were many other negative interactions with local Indigenous people.

After retiring in 1884, Wallace re-joined his wife and bought a substantial home at Reynella, The Braes, designed by the eminent Adelaide architect, Sir Charles S Kingston, and built in 1868.It was heritage listed in 1984. Proximity of The Braes to Coromandel Valley, ten miles away, was one of the main reasons the Wallaces chose to retire here so as to be close to the Hill and Bartlett families, and to receive their support and schooling for her daughter.

Shortly after, Abraham died by his own hand after an accident in which his buggy had collided with a hay van. On 27 April 1884 his coachman found him lying with his throat cut. At his inquest it was found that he had committed suicide while in an unsound state of mind. An inquest was held.

Abraham had died intestate and Matilda was appointed administratrix. Matilda carried out her duties as administratrix and was left to oversee two properties, Elsey River Station and Sturt's Meadows, each having a resident manager. It was reported in the Evening Journal, Mon 29 Sept 1884,that there were significant losses in connection with these properties at the time of Abraham's death. Matilda set about the task of returning her estate to profitability and stability after this period of volatility and losses.

It took a considerable time for Matilda to be granted ownership of both station properties. At the time it was uncommon for women to be managers but some did assume such roles often a result of widowhood. Few had training, experience or skills in this role and had to learn to manage when cast in that role.

The Elsey property was sold several years after Abraham's death to Victorian investors: W H Osmond and J A Panton. However, Matilda still owned property in NSW in 1891, Waverley No. 1 holding and Sturt's Meadow holding No. 141.

In 1892, Matilda sold her home and moved to a rented cottage at Walker Street Port Adelaide to be closer to family. The clearing sale notice in the Adelaide Advertiser on 13 August 1892 included "a hooded buggy by Duncan & Fraser, pole and shafts, a lady’s side-saddle, 2 cows, 2 heifers, 1 steer,15 Southdown ewes and lambs, all in splendid condition." Following a period of illness, starting in 1896, she moved in with her daughter, living on the Esplanade Largs Bay, South Australia, where she died on 21 January 1898, at the age of 60. . She was buried in St. Jude's Cemetery, Brighton. Probate for her substantial estate was granted in Melbourne on 15 August 1898. Her solicitor was Ernest E, Keep of Hopetoun Chambers. Matilda was a relatively wealthy woman. She left all her estate to her daughter Mary Ann (Annie) Sarah Woodhead. After her death, Matilda's typeset memoir found its way to the South Australian Public Library where it sat for years waiting to be discovered.

== Recognition ==
Matilda is recognised as a Barrier region pioneer settler in a Matilda Wallace Barrier Ranges Lookout is located at Lat: -31.386975 Lng: 141.611988 and a silhouette statue near Sturts Meadows Station It is a feature on the Sturt's Steps Touring Route that approximates the path taken by Charles Sturt when his Inland Expedition came into the Corner Country in 1845. He reported that there was a wide plain on the other side of the Barrier Range with good grass across the plains near the ranges and cypress pine on the sandy country further to the east. It was this plain that attracted settlers including Abraham and Matilda. The Wallace's are recognised as pastoral pioneers.

Matilda is recognised at the Milparinka Heritage Precinct in the Pioneer Women's Room os a pioneer. The room features A portrait of a young woman and child, representing Matilda Wallace of Sturt's Meadows Station, was painted by award-winning artist Jodi Daley.

== Memoir ==
In 1922 Alfred Thomas Saunders (1854–1940) wrote to The Register (Adelaide, 23 Jan) drawing attention to a pamphlet, ‘Twelve Years’ Life in Australia. From 1859 to 1871’, which he had found in the Public Library: ‘There is no date on the pamphlet, nor is the author's name given, and I have failed to trace her and appealed to the public to help him identify the author, her husband, and the name of their property, noting clues from the text about its author.

A week later the Hon John Lewis replied that he thought that the author of the pamphlet was the late Mrs Alexander Wallace, who had gone with her husband to NSW at the time mentioned by Mr Saunders and settled at Sturt’s Meadows. He had, in fact, met Abraham and Matilda in 1867 at an eating house in Mingary when he was based at Burra. In a paragraph published in The Register on Monday 5 June 1922, Saunders corrected the name of Matilda’s husband, Abraham, and indicated that his research had: ‘discovered the author of the above good account of what a plucky young and small 'Pommy' woman did in South Australia and New South Wales in the early days. Her name was Matilda Hill; she arrived here in the ship North, and her name is in The Register passenger list (29/1/59, p. 2, c. 1), she being then under 21.' Mr Lewis also paid a tribute to the wonderful pluck of the woman. 'It is a big thing to say, but it is questionable whether the annals of the Australian bush reveal a more courageous character among the women pioneers, than was Mrs Abraham Wallace. Her self-told story is indeed an inspiration.' Her memoir recounts her experiences since arriving in Australia and was retold and later reprinted in the Mt Gambier South Eastern Times in 1927. Like many other narratives written at that time, this retelling had an emphasis on the role of Abraham and down-played Matilda's role.

Her biographical account has found a place in various collections. Matilda is included as Mrs Abraham Wallace (Matilda Hill), in the Australian Autobiographical Narratives: An Annotated Bibliography, Volume 2. The authors recognised that the ‘revolutionary event of coming to Australia’ inspired some immigrants to become autobiographers. Often the primary reason for this was to explain to those left at home ‘the extraordinary differences of Australia’ from their native land. Individually and collectively ‘these narratives form a remarkably rich cultural resource, providing multiple perspectives on the early European settlement of Australia. Given the specific details, such as dates, in her memoir, it seems likely that Matilda kept a diary during her years in the bush.

She is also recognised by her inclusion in the Settler Literature Archive digital collection of the English Department of the University of North Dakota and cited in a number of other publications. In Barbara Dawson's PhD thesis, In the Eye of the Beholder: Representations of Australian Aborigines in the Published Works of Colonial Women Writers, she refers to Matilda's memoir in reference to Indigenous people helping or protecting settlers and women's ready access to guns.
