= Somerset Military Museum =

Museum in Taunton, United Kingdom

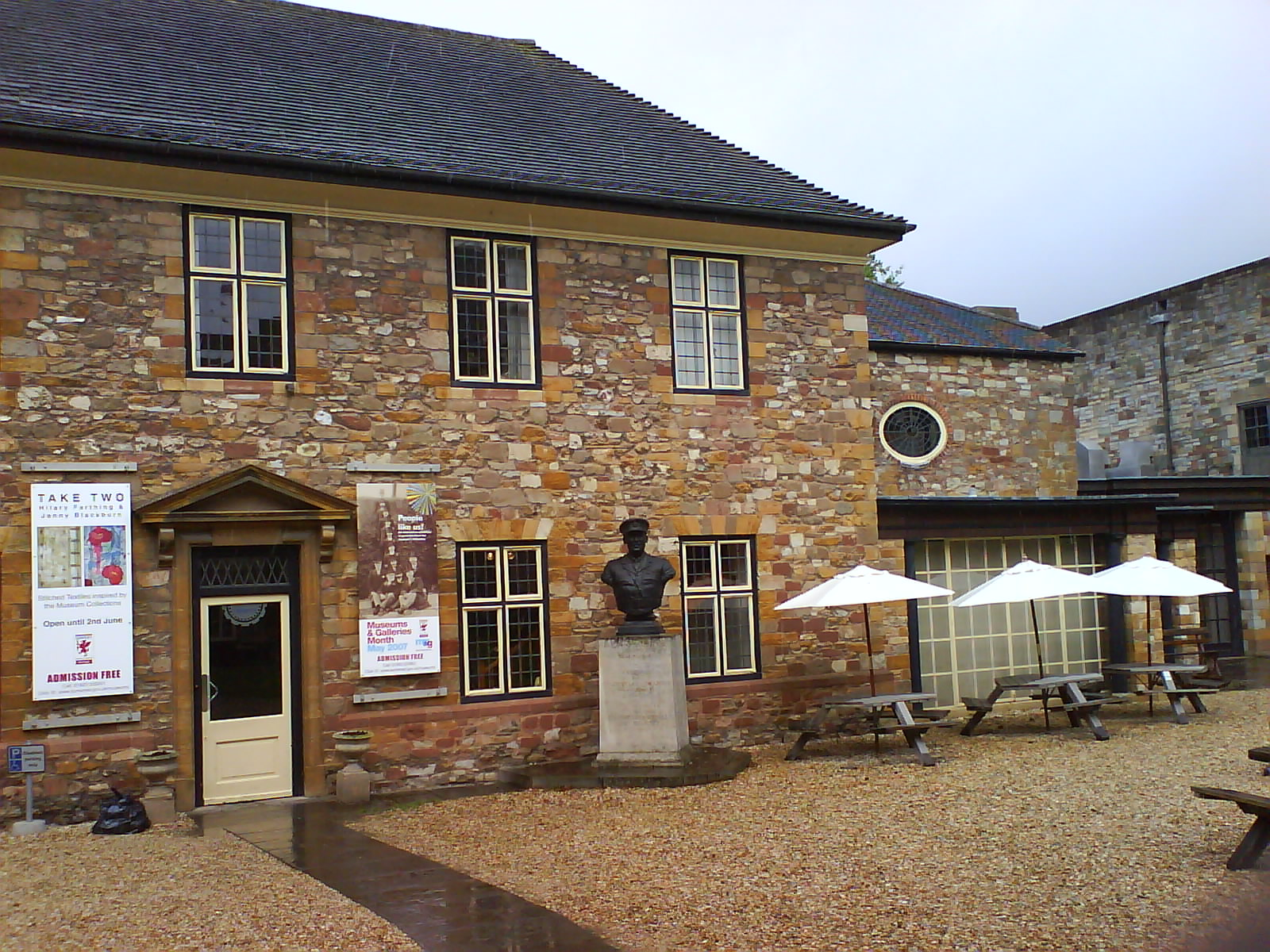

- Location within Somerset and the United Kingdom
- Established: 1974
- Location: Taunton, Somerset
- Coordinates: 51.0191°N 3.1000°W
- Website: www.sommilmuseum.org.uk

The Somerset Military Museum is part of the Museum of Somerset located in the 12th century great hall of Taunton Castle, in Taunton, Somerset. It is a "registered and accredited museum" with the British Museums, Libraries, and Archives Council, and is a part of the Museum of Somerset. The museum covers Somerset's military history from 1685 onward. It received a £10,000 grant from the Somerset Military Museum Trust for the restoration project.

== History ==
The Somerset Military Museum was established to accommodate the collections of the Somerset Light Infantry and the Somerset Volunteers at the Somerset County Museum in Taunton. It was officially opened by Queen Elizabeth The Queen Mother on 7 May 1974. Queen Elizabeth II, accompanied by the Duke of Edinburgh, visited the museum on 8 May 1987.

== Exhibitions ==
The main exhibitions in the Somerset Military Museum are being designed to show the history of Somerset's military regiments. They are being organized into two groups: a group of exhibitions on conflicts and another group of exhibitions on life in the regiments.

The Somerset Military Museum contains exhibitions for objects such as a silver model of the Gateway of India. In 1948, the Somerset Light Infantry was the last British brigade to leave India, and they were given the model. Another exhibition is of Prince Albert's Somerset Light Brigade. This exhibition discusses the unit's involvement in the Battle of Jellalabad and the First Anglo-Afghan War. Other exhibitions include ones on the Somerset and Cornwall Light Infantry, West Somerset Yeomanry, North Somerset Yeomanry, and the Somerset Rifles.
