= Pippa Pearce =

British conservator

Pippa Pearce MBE
- Pearce outside the British Museum in 2010

Academic work
- Discipline: Archaeology
- Sub-discipline: Conservation; coin hoards
- Institutions: British Museum

Philippa Mary Pearce, MBE is a British archaeologist and conservator. She is a senior conservator at the British Museum. She is particularly known for her work on coin hoards found in England and was awarded an MBE for services to metal conservation in 2018. She has worked on most of the coin hoards found in recent years as part of the Treasure process.

== Career ==
Pearce has led conservation work on many of the most famous coin hoards of recent years, including the Watlington Hoard, Tetbury Hoard, Yeovil Roman Hoard, Lenborough Hoard, and Seaton Down Hoard. Most famously, she has worked on the Frome Hoard.

Due to the large number of coin hoards discovered needing preliminary conservation at the British Museum, Pearce has changed metal conservation processes in order to manage the large volume of coins, particularly Roman coins.

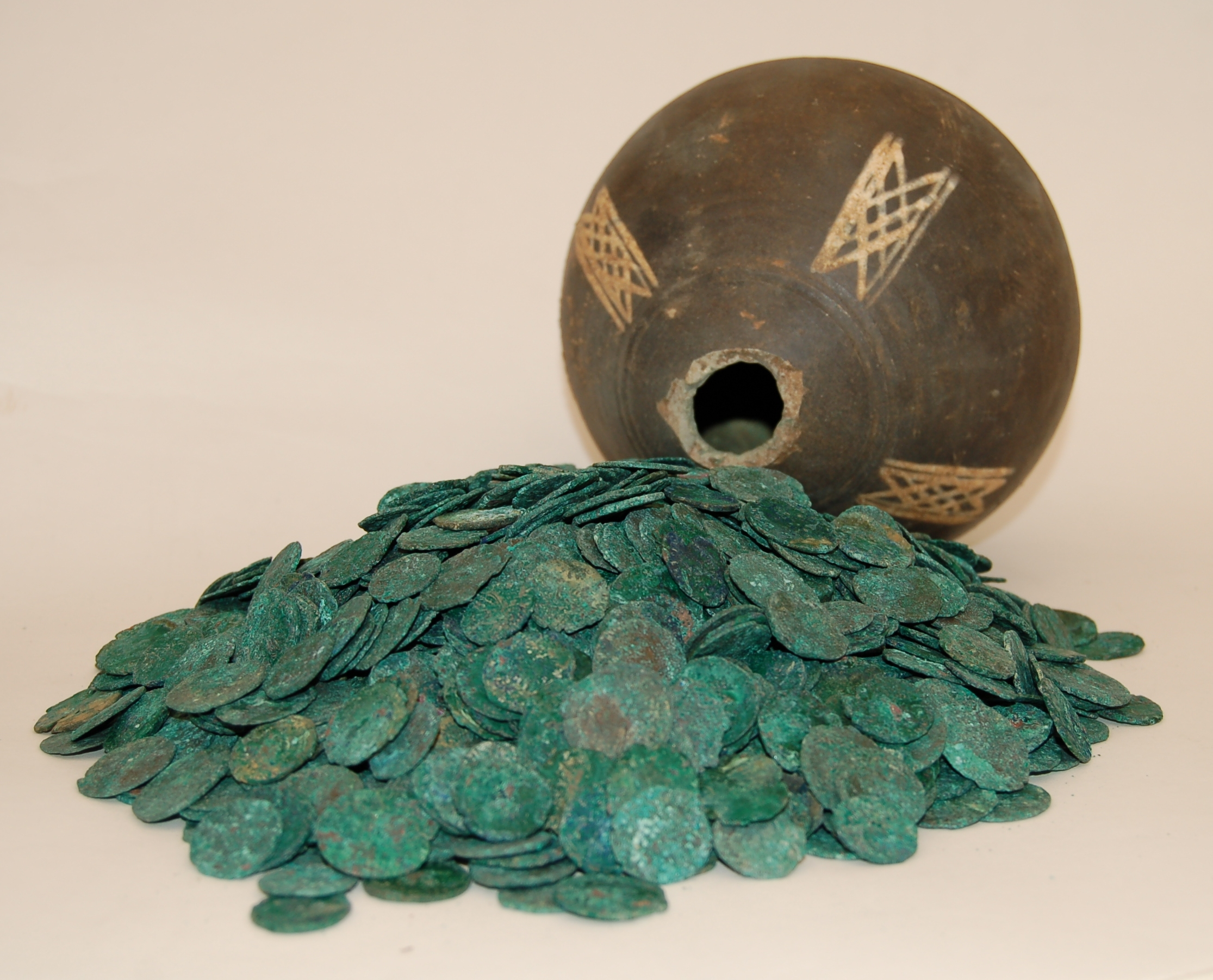
Tetbury Hoard: Cleaned pot and coins (FindID 515068)

Pearce is the conservator for excavations at Sidon conducted by the British Museum and the Lebanese Department of Antiquities. She works as a small finds and site conservator on a number of excavations including the sites of Kamenica, Butrint, and Apollonia in Albania, and the sites of Kawa and the Northern Dongala Reach in Sudan.

== Publications ==
- "We do it indoors and sitting down, but still call it archaeology – unravelling and recording blocklifted hoards" in Encounters, Excavations and Argosies: Essays for Richard Hodges eds John Mitchell, John Moreland and Bea Leal (Archaeopress 2017) 236-9
- "Practicable Solutions' in Festschrift for Prof Korkuti: New Directions in Albanian Archaeology eds L. Bejko and R. Hodges, International Centre for Albanian archaeology (Monograph Series No.1, Tirana, 2006) 356-367
