= Taunton Castle =

Fortified castle in Somerset, England

- Taunton, Somerset, England
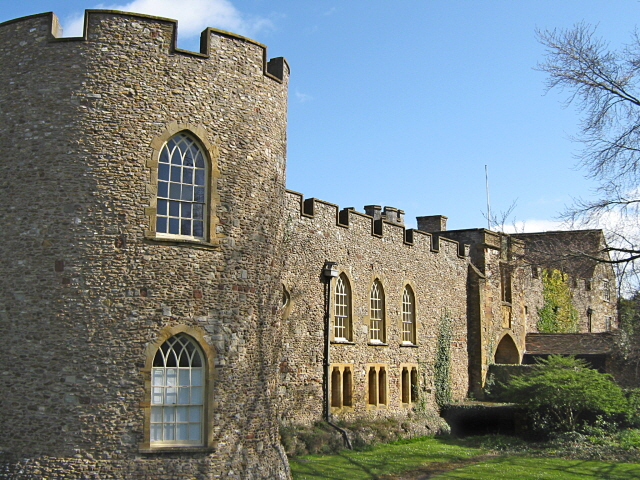
- Taunton Castle

Site information
- Type: Norman

Location
- Shown within Somerset
- Coordinates: 51°00′57″N 3°06′17″W

Site history
- Built: 1129
- Built by: William Giffard
- Materials: Stone

Scheduled monument
- Official name: Taunton Castle: a motte and bailey castle, part of the outer bailey, an Anglo-Saxon cemetery and a Civil War artillery platform
- Designated: 25 July 1923
- Reference no.: 1013541

Taunton Castle is a castle built to defend the town of Taunton, Somerset, England. It has origins in the Anglo Saxon period and was later the site of a priory. The Normans then built a stone structured castle, which belonged to the Bishops of Winchester. The current heavily reconstructed buildings are the inner ward, which now houses the Museum of Somerset and the Somerset Military Museum. The building was designated a grade I listed building in 1952.

== Anglo Saxon origins ==
The earliest fortification of Taunton started for King Ine of Wessex and Æthelburg, in or about the year 710. However, according to the Anglo-Saxon Chronicle this was destroyed twelve years later, however it is unlikely this was on the site of the current castle. An ecclesiastical minster is traditionally said to have been founded at Taunton, only a few years later, by Queen Frithugyth, wife of King Æthelheard of Wessex, and the Bishops of Wessex appear to have built a manor house, adjoining it.

== Medieval and Tudor eras ==
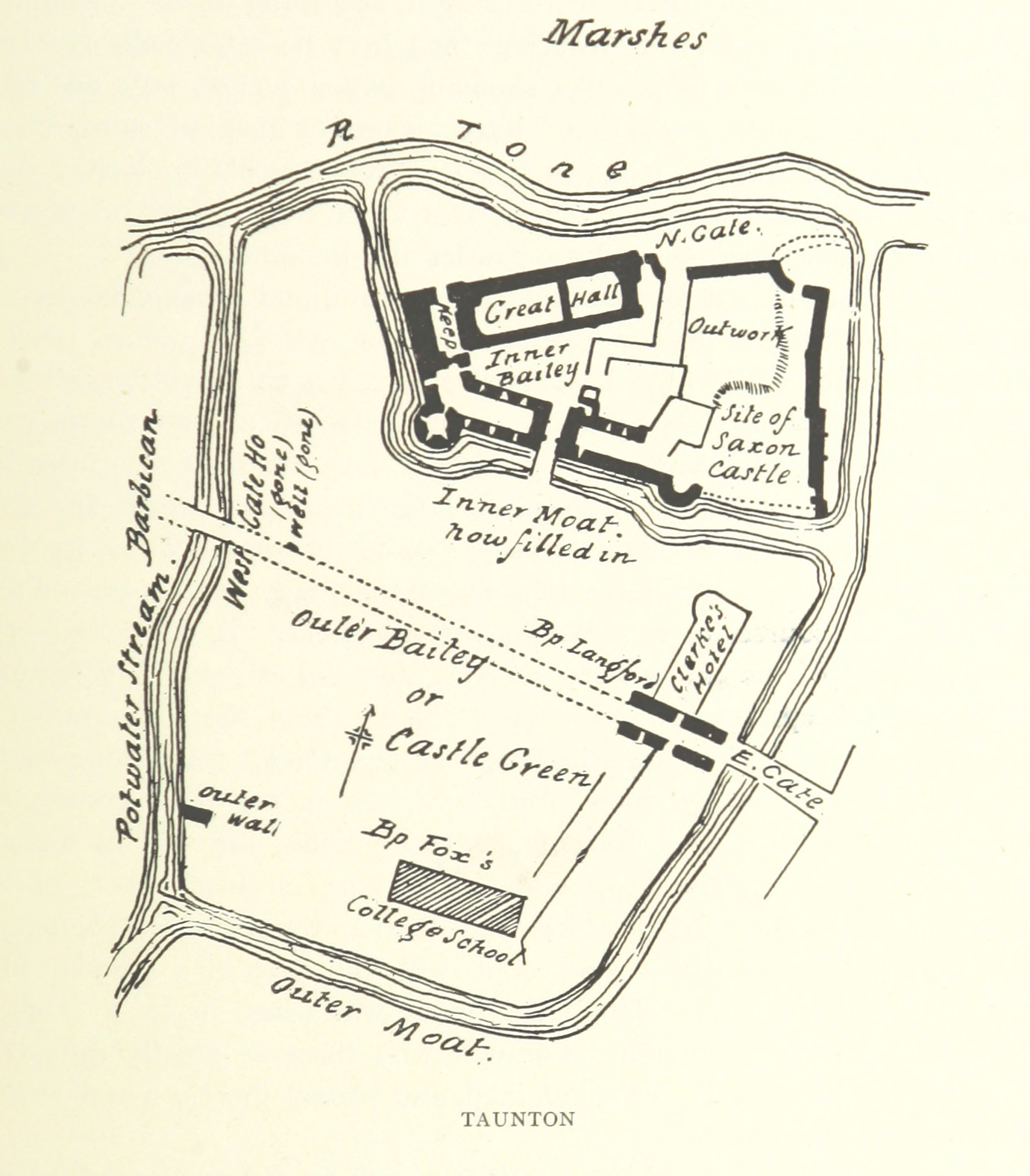
A plan of the castle from J. D. Mackenzie's The Castles of England: their story and structure

At the time of the Domesday Book in 1086, Taunton belonged to the Bishop of Winchester, who had a minster or Augustinian Priory on the site. Between 1107 and 1129 William Giffard, the Chancellor of King Henry I, converted the bishop's hall into a castle. In 1216, Bishop Peter des Roches, a supporter of King John, defended the castle during a barons' revolt. By the late 12th century the keep measured 65 feet (20 m) by 98 feet (30 m) with a first floor great hall over a stone vaulted undercroft. During the Second Barons' War it was used as a prison for the son of Simon de Montfort who was held here until 1282. In 1451, when the Earl of Devon besieged the castle which was held by Lord Bonville, it was arranged around two baileys.

The gate-house of the inner ward was probably of Edward I's date (1239–1307), but it was changed by Bishop Walter Langton in 1496. He inserted a large two-lighted Tudor window and placed a tablet bearing his own arms, supported by angels, above it and the Royal Coat of King Henry VII below. The Great Hall, which stands just opposite the gateway, is 120 feet (37 m) by 31 feet (9 m), with walls apparently, in part, Norman, but much changed by later generations. Bishop Langton inserted Tudor windows but all of them, save two in the north front, have been replaced by seventeenth- or eighteenth-century substitutes. The last building erected within the walls was a schoolhouse, paid for by Bishop Richard Foxe in the 1520s.

== Stuart era and Civil War ==
Taunton Castle had fallen into ruin by 1600 but it was repaired during the Civil War. Taunton had been captured by the Parliamentarian army under the Earl of Essex in June 1644 making it the only Parliamentary enclave in the South West of the country. After Essex's army was forced to surrender at Lostwithiel in Cornwall in September, the Royalists maintained a Siege of Taunton. From July 1644 to July 1645 Parliamentary forces commanded by Colonel Robert Blake were besieged by Royalist forces under Lord Goring, although the town was briefly relieved by Sir William Waller in late November. A relief column under Colonel Ralph Weldon made it to Taunton on 11 May, but the combined forces were still besieged. The two generals held out until help arrived on 14 June after the troops could be spared from the Battle of Naseby.

It was in the Great Hall, in 1685, that Judge Jeffreys held the Bloody Assizes following the Monmouth Rebellion. Of more than 500 supporters of James Monmouth brought before the court on 18 and 19 September, 144 were hanged and their remains displayed around the county to ensure people understood the fate of those who rebelled against the king.

== Architecture ==
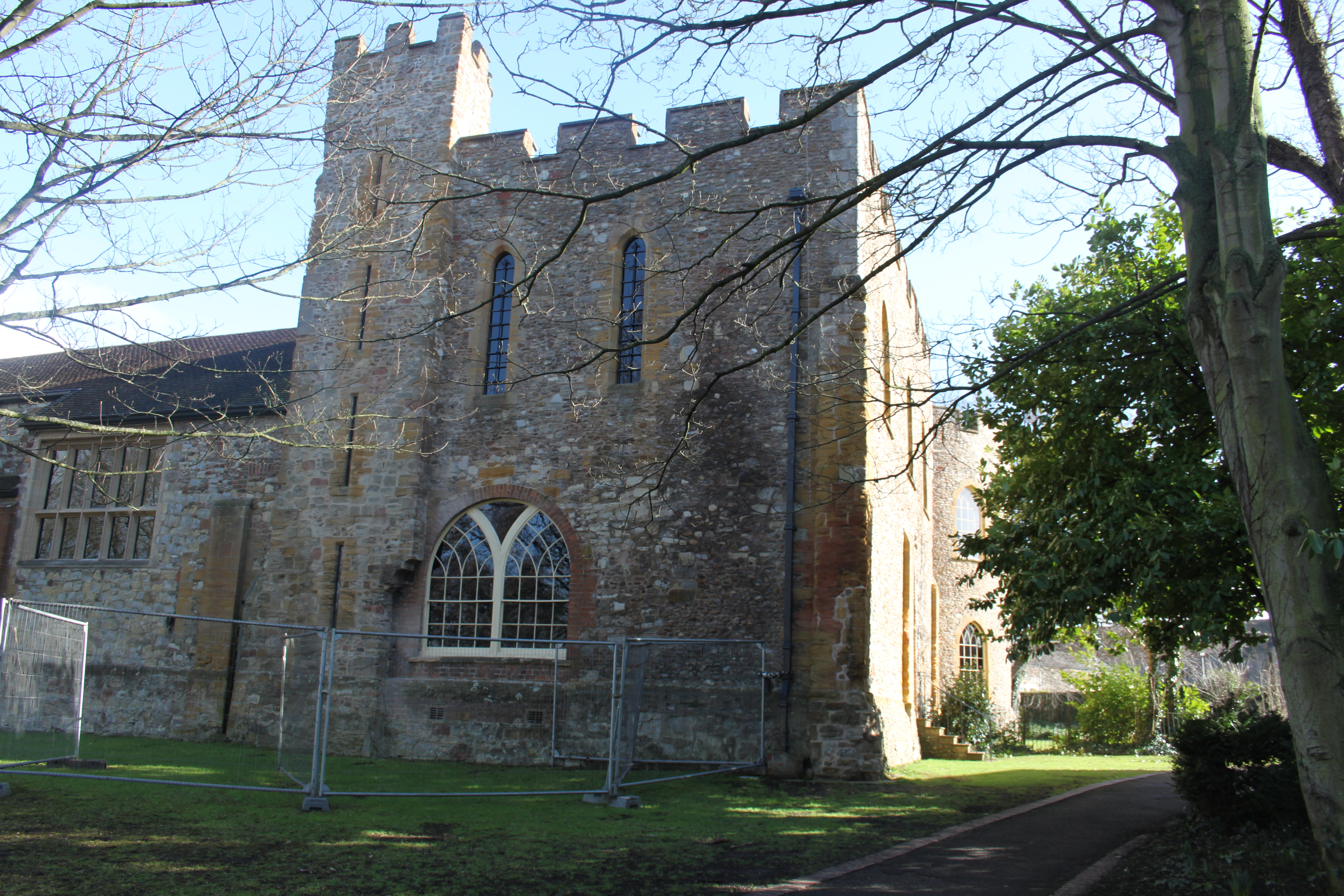
Rear of the castle

Taunton was a typical Norman keep of the first half of the twelfth century, 50 feet (15 m) long by 40 feet (12 m) wide, in three stories, with walls some 13 feet (4 m) thick. This was let into the walls of an inner ward with a stone enceinte and, there was an outer bailey represented by the modern "Castle Green". Until the late 17th century the castle was still used as a prison.

By 1780, many parts of the castle had fallen into a bad condition and were repaired in a Georgian style by Sir Benjamin Hammet, a banker of Lombard Street, London, and the Member of Parliament for Taunton. In 1786 he purchased the grant as bailiff and keeper of Taunton Castle in the names of his sons and his nephew. He put on a new roof, inserted many windows and recast many other details all round the castle. During the 18th and 19th centuries the Great Hall was used for public meetings.

The outer ward is now occupied by two hotels, which have been crenellated, in order to be in keeping with the genuine battlements of the inner ward. But the great gate, opening into the enclosure, where they stand, is in part a genuine antique, having the arches of an "Early Decorated " gate-house of about the time of Edward I, though the superstructure is a restoration of 1816. In 1873 it was bought by the Somerset Archaeological and Natural History Society and between 1899 and 1900 the Great Hall was repaired and refitted as their chief museum space. In 1908–9 the Adam Library was created to house the society's growing collection of books.

== Modern era ==
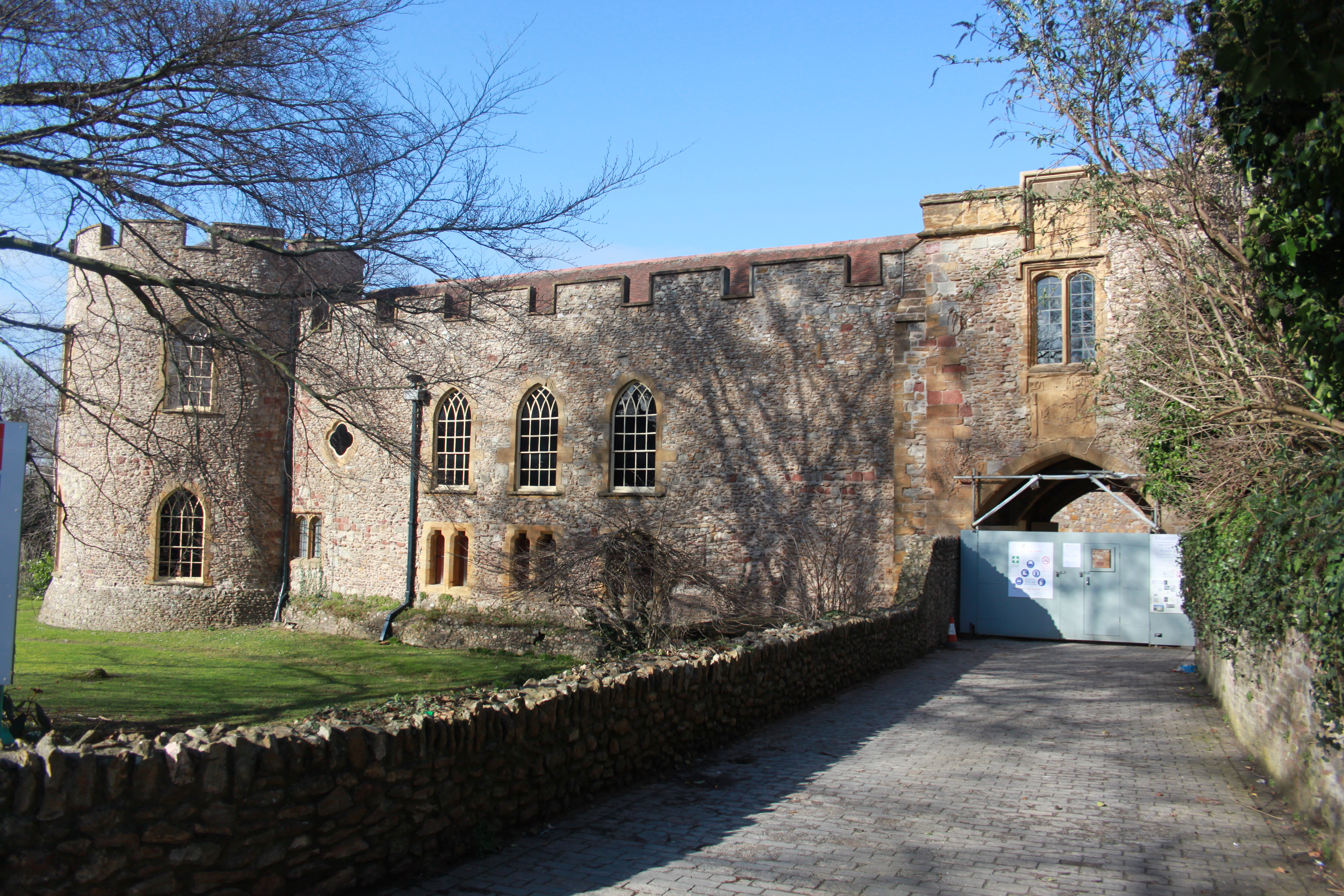
The closed entrance

The great hall and inner ward of the original castle make up the Museum of Somerset which opened in September 2011 after a £7 million refurbishment, partially funded by the Heritage Lottery Fund.

The 17th-century Castle House has been designated as an Ancient Monument. Due to its condition it was placed on the Heritage at Risk Register and underwent necessary repairs, but as of 2013 is still unoccupied.

== See also ==
- Castles in Great Britain and Ireland
- List of castles in England
