= Abraham Wallace =

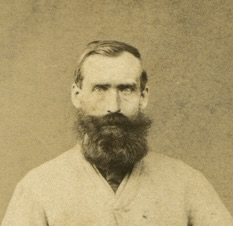
Wallace c. 1875

Abraham Wallace (1828 – 27 April 1884), was a 19th-century Australian pastoralist. Born in County Offaly, Ireland, to Jeremiah and Anne Wallace, he emigrated with his family to Australia aboard the Joseph Soames, a 780 ton barque, arriving in Adelaide in the Colony of South Australia, on 23 November 1850. Abraham was 20. His family settled in the Mount Gambier district. Wallace and his wife Matilda (née Matilda Hill) were for many years frontier sheep and cattle farmers, which she documented in a memoir.

== Sheep and cattle farming ==
After a short time on the Victorian goldfields, Abraham returned to Mt Gambier, where he married Matilda Hill. Following the death of their first child, Abraham and his wife departed from Mount Gambier in 1863 with a wagon, two horses, bedding, and provisions to search for land in Queensland. Their journey led them to Mount Murchison, 16 kilometres from Wilcannia on the Darling River, where they briefly opened a store. Due to governmental entry restrictions for livestock into Queensland, they returned to Adelaide. A year later, they returned to the Barrier region of the Colony of New South Wales with two men, 25 horses, 1,400 sheep, and supplies for 18 months. They crossed the Barrier Ranges near Byjerkerno, intending to settle at the frontier of white settlement.

Instead, they entered a nomadic phase, moving throughout the Fowlers Gap area to meet their livestock's need for water and feed. Regularly they walked the sheep from one waterhole to another returning to their old camp when the rains came. Often local Aboriginal people travelled with them, scouting ahead for water and helping to shepherd the sheep. The teenage Blore brothers, Fred and George, also gave assistance. Despite the arid climate, wool production proved economically viable.

The Wallaces were some of the earliest settlers in the region, with a pastoral run, Sturts Meadows, located approximately 110 kilometres north of Broken Hill. The property was formally leased in September 1869 and the prior occupant, squatter George Raines, displaced.

The main water source at Sturts Meadows was the intermittent Caloola Creek and thus the Wallaces had to frequently relocate during droughts, seeking water at locations such as Cobham Lake. The Wallaces observed the presence of rock art on their property. It has been the subject of study in recent times and the handprints at nearby Mootwingee were of interest to Matilda's nephew,Tom, who is frequently mentioned in her memoir. In 1871 Abraham built a substantial stone homestead above flood level. The homestead and stock were then supplied with water from a permanent well sunk on the creek near their original camp, sited with the help of local Aboriginal people.

Pregnant Matilda left Sturts Meadows and travelled to Adelaide late in 1872, leaving Abraham to manage their property which by 1876, was 40,469 ha in area and had significant improvements and by 1882 32,000 sheep were shorn. Some time after, she began writing her memoir, "Twelve Years' Life in Australia, from 1859 to 1871", which was typeset and posthumously deposited in the Adelaide Public Library.[8] Abraham later retold the story.

On 21 January 1880 Abraham set out for the Northern Territory, where he had secured a lease for a cattle-run, and established Elsey Station. He travelled from Sturts Meadows with several wagons and about 100 horses. The route was via Blackall and Aramac, where 2,700 head of cattle were purchased, then by way of the Flinders, Leichardt and Albert Rivers to Bourke and on to the Nicholson River. His journey was approximately 3300 km and had taken 18 months. Elsey Station was founded in partnership with his nephews, Jeremiah and John Wallace, and John Henry Palmer. Shortly after arriving, Abraham returned to Sturt's Meadows, leaving John Palmer as manager of Elsey Station. Elsey was small with only about 1,500 cattle. It was a marginal business proposition that appears to have been a drain on Abraham’s finances as noted in his obituary. The establishment of Elsey Station was not without conflict as introducing cattle to the area reduced access to resources by local Aboriginal people.

The Elsey National Park honours explorer Joseph Ravenscroft Elsey, who accompanied Augustus Charles Gregory on an 1856 expedition from Victoria River to Queensland via the Roper River. The park was also made famous by Jeannie Gunn's novel "We of the Never-Never," which depicted life at Elsey Station, the third Station in NT, which commenced with Abraham Wallace's lease application in 1877, taken-up in 1879.

== Retirement and death ==
After retiring in 1884, Wallace re-joined his wife and bought a substantial home at Reynella, The Braes, designed by the eminent Adelaide architect, Sir Charles S Kingston, and built in 1868. Shortly after, he died by his own hand after an accident. He was buried in St. Jude's Cemetery, Brighton. Elsey Station and Sturts Meadows were left in charge of their resident managers. The Elsey property was sold several years after Abraham's death. Following Abraham Wallace’s death in 1884, Elsey Station had several owners before being purchased in 1901 by a group that included Aeneas Gunn. He managed the property until his death in March 1903. The story of Aeneas Gunn, and his wife Jeannie Gunn was the subject of her 1908 autobiographical novel We of the Never Never. An 1875 photograph of Abraham Wallace has been archived in the South Australian library collection. In 1998 the title deeds of the property were handed over to the traditional owners.

== Memoir ==
In 1922, A. T. Saunders, with the help of John Lewis, who had met Abraham and Matila at Mingary, South Australia in 1867, identified her as the author of an anonymous memoir previously posthumously deposited in the Adelaide Public Library. The memoir was retold and later reprinted in the Mt Gambier South Eastern Times in 1927. Like many other narratives written at that time, this retelling had an emphasis on the role of Abraham. The memoir is available online.
