= High Ham =

Village and civil parish in Somerset, England

Coordinates: 51.0765°N 2.8203°W

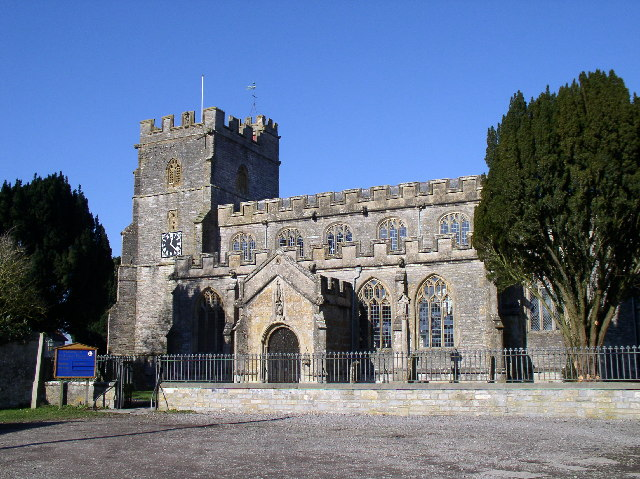
- Church of Saint Andrew, High Ham

- Location within Somerset
- Population: 909 (2011)
- OS grid reference: ST425310
- Unitary authority: Somerset Council
- Ceremonial county: Somerset
- Region: South West
- Country: England
- Sovereign state: United Kingdom
- Post town: LANGPORT
- Postcode district: TA10
- Dialling code: 01458
- Police: Avon and Somerset
- Fire: Devon and Somerset
- Ambulance: South Western
- UK Parliament: Glastonbury and Somerton

High Ham is a village and civil parish in Somerset, England. Within the parish of High Ham, there are the villages of High Ham and Low Ham and the hamlets of Bowdens, Henley, Paradise and Picts Hill.

== History ==
Within the parish of High Ham, there have been two Roman villas discovered: Low Ham Roman Villa and another in High Ham.

The parish of High Ham was part of the Whitley Hundred.

== Governance ==
The parish council has responsibility for local issues, including setting an annual precept (local rate) to cover the council's operating costs and producing annual accounts for public scrutiny. The parish council evaluates local planning applications and works with the local police, district council officers, and neighbourhood watch groups on matters of crime, security, and traffic. The parish council's role also includes initiating projects for the maintenance and repair of parish facilities, as well as consulting with the district council on the maintenance, repair, and improvement of highways, drainage, footpaths, public transport, and street cleaning. Conservation matters (including trees and listed buildings) and environmental issues are also the responsibility of the council.

For local government purposes, since 1 April 2023, the parish comes under the unitary authority of Somerset Council. Prior to this, it was part of the non-metropolitan district of South Somerset (established under the Local Government Act 1972). It was part of Langport Rural District before 1974.

It is also part of the Glastonbury and Somerton county constituency represented in the House of Commons of the Parliament of the United Kingdom. It elects one Member of Parliament (MP) by the first past the post system of election.

== Geography ==
Eastfield, Sedgemoor Hill is a grassland with orchids and butterflies which has been designated as a local nature reserve.

== Landmarks ==
Stembridge Tower Mill is the only remaining thatched windmill in England and is under the care of the National Trust. Constructed in 1822 it was damaged by storms and left running via steam by 1897/8 and last used commercially in 1910. In 1969 Professor H. H. Bellot left the windmill, cottage and garden to the National Trust in his will. The mill has four floors, a thatched cap and is constructed of local limestone known as Blue Lias.

== Education ==
High Ham Primary School is a voluntarily controlled Church of England school.

== Religious sites ==
High Ham Church is dedicated to St Andrew. There is documentary evidence for a church in High Ham in 1168 although the current buildings are later in date. The tower dates from the early 14th century, the nave from 1476 and chancel from 1499. It has been designated by English Heritage as a Grade I listed building.

There is also a church without dedication, which was formerly private chapel to the manor. It stands on the site of an earlier church, and was started in the early 17th century, damaged in the English Civil War, and completed in 1690.

== Notable people from High Ham ==
- Ned Sherrin, broadcaster, author and stage director
- Simon Brint, musician and composer
- Matilda Wallace, 19th century pioneer Australian pastoralist
