= Sturts Meadows Station =

Pastoral lease in New South Wales

Coordinates: 31.294°S 141.71°E

Location in New South Wales

Sturts Meadows Station, most commonly known as Sturts Meadows, is a pastoral lease that has operated as a cattle station and a sheep station in outback New South Wales.

It is situated about 77 kilometres (48 mi) north east of Broken Hill and 140 kilometres (87 mi) west of White Cliffs.

The station was established by Abraham and Matilda Wallace in a locality named Sturt's Meadows in honour of Sturt's 1844-5 journey in which he followed the Darling River to the point that gave the shortest plains crossing to the southern end of the Barrier Range. The property became known as Sturt's Meadows Station.In 1863 Matilda and Abraham left Mt Gambier with a wagon, a pair of horses, bedding and provisions to look for land in Queensland.They reached Mt Murchison 16 km from Wilcannia and opened a store which closed after some months. Abraham then continued his journey to Queensland, only to find that the government would not allow stock to enter from other colonies. He returned to Mt Murchison, and they later moved to Adelaide, travelling, against advice, over the Barrier Ranges, risking death from thirst on what would have been a hot dry journey to Mingary (South Australia). A year later, they returned from Adelaide across the Barrier Range with two men, 25 horses, 1,400 sheep and 18 month's supplies, in order to settle on some country 'on the other side of the ranges' in the Colony of New South Wales.

The Wallaces then began a nomadic period in which they moved about the area around Fowlers Gap with their stock seeking water and feed. After almost five years of moving around, the Wallaces decided to return to Sturt's Meadow.

George Raines was a landless bushman "who roamed the bush with his stock, squatting on the unfenced runs wherever he found good feed". When Abraham Wallace arrived back at Sturts Meadow in 1868, he found Raines there. Raines was forced to move on when Abraham Wallace took up a lease at Sturt's on Caloola Creek in September 1869. Raines later settled at nearby Mootwingee sheep station.

However, a continued lack of water meant the Wallaces stayed on the move. By 1876 a well on the creek near their original camp was providing permanent water and the station was 100,000 acres (40,469 ha) in size.

Wallace embarked on a trek from Sturts Meadow in January 1880 heading north to the properties he had acquired leases to in the Northern Territory along the Roper River in 1879. On arriving in Longreach, some 750 miles (1,207 km) from Sturts Meadows, he bought 2,728 head of cattle and continued his journey eventually arriving in July 1881 after covering a distance of about 2,000 miles (3,219 km). The property was later named Elsey Station and Wallace left the next day to return to Sturts Meadows.

By 1882 the station shore 32,000 sheep, and by 1883 the owners had spent £24,080 on improvements.

Wallace retired in 1884 and appointed a manager to run the property.

Matilda Wallace anonymously published a pamphlet Twelve years' life in Australia, from 1859 to 1871, which was discovered and identified by Alfred Thomas Saunders in 1922. Saunder's informant, Hon John Lewis, had met Matilda at Mingary in 1867. Sackville Kidman, the brother and business partner of Sidney Kidman, once worked at Sturts Meadow as the station manager until silver was discovered at the Barrier Range and he started a butchering business in Silverton. Kidman acquired the property some time prior to 1924 and was making plans to build up a flock of 100,000 sheep across his properties in the area including Sturts Meadows, Morden, Longawirra and Corona Stations. By 1924 the area was being plagued by dingos, Sturts Meadows had been carrying flocks of up to 100,000 sheep but since the pest arrived numbers had dropped substantially.

The property was on the market again in 1928 when the trustees of the late W.H. Williams put the property up for auction. The property now occupied an area of 196,000 acres (79,318 ha) and was divided in 14 paddocks. A stone house with seven rooms, men's quarters and a ten stand shearing shed were among the improvements. The homestead well had 16 tanks and could water 7,000 sheep and the land was described as being made up of grasslands and salt bush country.

Bijerkerno Gorge, where Eight Mile Creek breaks through the Barrier Ranges, is situated on the property. On April 3, 2004, The Sydney Morning Herald reported that 5,600 hectares around this gorge had been fenced off to protect the environment and the remains of a tin mine.

== See also ==
- List of ranches and stations
