= Carausius =

Emperor in Britain and northern Gaul from 286 to 293

- Augustus of Gaul and Britannia
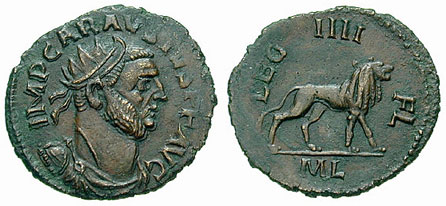
- Carausius coin from Londinium mint. On the reverse, the lion, symbol of Legio IV Flavia Felix.

Emperor of Britannia
- Reign: c. 286 AD–c. 293 AD
- Predecessor: None
- Successor: Allectus
- Born: c. 3rd century AD; Gallia Belgica
- Died: c. 293 AD; Britain
Names
- Marcus Aurelius Mausaeus Carausius
Regnal name
- Imperator Caesar Marcus Aurelius Mausaeus Carausius Augustus

Marcus Aurelius Mausaeus Carausius (born c. 3rd century AD - died c. 293 AD) was a military commander of the Roman Empire in the 3rd century. He was a Menapian from Belgic Gaul, who usurped power in 286, during the Carausian Revolt, declaring himself emperor in Britain and northern Gaul (Imperium Britanniarum). He did this only 13 years after the Gallic Empire was ended in 273. He held power for seven years, fashioning the name "Emperor of the North" for himself, before being assassinated by his finance minister Allectus.

== Early life and assumption of Imperial title ==
Carausius was of humble origin, a Menapian who distinguished himself during Maximian's campaign against the Bagaudae rebels in northern Gaul in 286. This success, and his former occupation as a pilot, led to his appointment to command the Classis Britannica, a fleet based in the English Channel, with the responsibility of eliminating Frankish and Saxon pirates who had been raiding the coasts of Armorica and Belgica. He was suspected of allowing pirates to carry out raids and collect loot before attacking them, then keeping captured treasure for himself, and Maximian ordered his execution. In late 286 or early 287 Carausius learned of this sentence and responded by declaring himself Emperor in Britain and northern Gaul. His forces comprised not only his fleet, augmented by new ships he had built and the three legions stationed in Britain, but also a legion he had seized in Gaul, a number of foreign auxiliary units, a levy of Gaulish merchant ships, and barbarian mercenaries attracted by the prospect of booty.

British historian and archaeologist Sheppard Frere wonders how Carausius was able to win support from the army when his command had been sea-based, and speculates that he had perhaps been involved in an unrecorded victory in Britain, connected with Diocletian's assumption of the title Britannicus Maximus in 285, and signs of destruction in Romano-British towns at this time. The campaign against the Bagaudae, however, was evidently land-based and may have been responsible for Carausius's popularity with the army. Equally, if the accusations of larceny are true, he could perhaps have afforded to buy their loyalty.

Maximian prepared an invasion of Britain in 288 or 289 to oust him, but it failed. A panegyric delivered to Constantius Chlorus attributes this failure to bad weather, but notes that Carausius claimed a military victory. Eutropius says that hostilities were in vain thanks to Carausius's military skill, and peace was agreed. Carausius began to entertain visions of legitimacy and official recognition.

It has been suggested that Carausius may have been responsible for the series of fortifications on both sides of the English Channel known as the Saxon Shore, another factor that could explain the failure of Maximian's invasion.

== Overthrow and death ==
This situation continued until 293, when Constantius Chlorus (Constantius I), now the western Caesar, marched into Gaul and reclaimed it for the empire. He isolated Carausius by besieging the port of Gesoriacum (Boulogne-sur-Mer) and invading Batavia in the Rhine delta, securing his rear against Carausius's Frankish allies. He could not yet mount an invasion of Britain until a suitable fleet could be built. Nevertheless, Carausius's grip on power was fatally undermined. Allectus, whom he had put in charge of his treasury, assassinated him and assumed power himself. His reign would last only three years, after which he was defeated and killed by Constantius's subordinate Julius Asclepiodotus.

== Coinage and inscriptions ==
Coinage is the main source of information about the rogue emperor; his coinage was issued from mints in Londinium, Rotomagus (Rouen) and a third site, possibly Colonia Claudia Victricensis (Colchester). He also used them for sophisticated propaganda. He issued the first proper silver coins that had appeared in the Roman Empire for generations, knowing that good quality bullion coinage would enhance his legitimacy and make him look more successful than Diocletian and Maximian.

In April 2010 a large hoard of over 52,500 Roman coins was unearthed in a field near Frome, Somerset. 766 of these coins were determined to have been produced during Carausius's reign, of which only 5 were silver denarii. This find roughly equates to four years' pay for a Roman legionary, but the presence of later coin issues implies that the group was not deposited until after Carausius's death.

In the Welsh village of Penmachno the Carausius stone was found in 1856 beneath the church. It dates to the 5th or 6th century and bears the name Carausius as well as the Chi Rho symbol. It has been suggested that it is his gravestone.

He is very likely the namesake of the Welsh town of Tregaron, whose church, St Caron is likely named after him.

=== Character portrayal ===
His initial issues show him as rough and thuggish, though the technical standard of die cutting on good specimens can be seen to be excellent. The intention was to portray a rough and thuggish man; his later coins show him as trim and beneficent.

=== Claims of Imperial legitimacy ===
He struck coins that showed three portrait heads on the reverse instead of the usual one, and a legend on the obverse including PAX AVGGG, the peace of three Augusti. This would imply that he was recognized by the other two current Augusti, Diocletian and Maximian, but their own coins of the time proclaim the attributes of only two Augusti, PAX AVGG. Carausius also had himself depicted as a member of the Tetrarchy's college of emperors, issuing coins with the legend CARAVSIVS ET FRATRES SVI, 'Carausius and his brothers' with portraits of himself with Diocletian and Maximian.

=== Virgilian and other literary references ===
Carausius appears to have appealed to native British dissatisfaction with Roman rule; he issued coins with legends such as Restitutor Britanniae (Restorer of Britain) and Genius Britanniae (Spirit of Britain). Some of these silver coins bear the legend Expectate veni, "Come long-awaited one", recognised to allude to a messianic line in the Aeneid by the Augustan poet Virgil, written more than 300 years previously.

Some of the silver coins bear the legend RSR in the exergue (an area on a coin below the legend). This was considered a mystery for some time. Three Carausian copper-alloy medallions, now in the British Museum, have also survived. One has the reverse legend VICTOR CARAVSIUS AVG GERM MAX with RSR in the exergue; the second has the reverse legend VICTOR CARAVSI AVG ('The Victory of Carausius Augustus') with INPCDA in the exergue; and the third is too damaged for an exergue legend to be visible but bears the reverse legend PACATOR ORBIS 'Peace-bringer to the world'. The medallions depict Carausius in consular garb and are around 34-35 mm, weighing ~22 g. The medals appeared on the market in the twentieth century and reached the British Museum in 1972, 1967 (this one was first shown to the Museum in 1931) and 1997 respectively. All bear evidence of chemical corrosion resulting from burial of some sort as can be seen from their present appearance.

Since 1998 these letters have been recognised as representing the sixth and seventh lines of the Fourth Eclogue of Virgil, which reads Redeunt Saturnia Regna, Iam Nova Progenies Caelo Demittitur Alto, meaning "The Golden Ages are back, now a new generation is let down from Heaven above". Virgil's works, or at any rate quotations from them, were current in Roman popular culture. Suetonius cites three instances in which Virgilian lines were quoted. Cassius Dio cites an instance of a praetorian tribune quoting Virgil as a means of criticising Septimius Severus after an attack on Hatra went badly in 199.

Copper-alloy medallions already existed in the contemporary repertoire of imperial Roman coinage so Carausius's production should not be considered exceptional. Numerian (283-4) and his brother Carinus (283-5) both issued copper-alloy medallions of similar size and weight to those of Carausius, often depicting the three Monetae (goddesses of the mint). Another depicts Numerian in consular garb and on the reverse himself and his father Carus in a quadriga pulled by Victory with the legend TRIVNF.QVADOR, 'the triumph over the Quadi tribe', and is clearly similar in tone to the Carausian INPCDA medallion.

Although the Virgilian reference might seem remarkable in the context of late third century Roman Britain it is apparent from other contemporary literature that the Tetrarchy legitimist regime was utilising Virgilian allusions and references in its propaganda, and claiming itself to have restored a Golden Age. 'The rule of Saturn over a golden age is a literary commonplace ... as is the association of any emperor's reign with the same thing'.

An imperial panegyric to Maximian states 'Indeed, as the fact is, those golden ages which once flourished briefly in the reign of Saturn, are now reborn under the perpetual guidance of Jove and Hercules.' Lactantius, a Christian writer of the period and opponent of the Tetrarchs, makes a number of disparaging references to the Tetrarchs and their Saturnian pretensions which seem to be a refutation of official propaganda.

Carausius was claiming to represent a revival of traditional Roman virtues and the great traditions of the Empire as established by Augustus in the last decades of the first century BC, not in Rome but in Britain. However, he appears to have adopted a propaganda theme that was already current in Tetrarchal publicity which corresponds with the use of similar literary allusions.

An alternative school of thought exists which argues the medallions must be eighteenth-century fantasy pieces on the basis that such arcane literary allusions would have been too obscure to Carausius and his army. This argument contends that the antiquarian William Stukeley or someone like him found the RSR on Carausius's silver coinage, and noted that this matched the Redeunt Saturnia Regna (RSR) of the 6th line of the Fourth Eclogue. Thus inspired, the medallions were created with the next line of the Eclogue included on one of them. The central points of this argument are that Stukeley had published a detailed book on Carausius and his coinage, and that the medallions have no known provenance. However, this published argument does not offer any evidence to support Stukeley's involvement or motives (since Stukeley never mentions the medals or a Virgilian expansion of the RSR coins known to him), or include discussion of the literary evidence of the contemporary panegyrics or any of the scholarly publications concerning them, or explain why the medallions appear on the basis of their present appearance to have been buried and why they were unknown until 1931 when the INPCDA one was first brought to the British Museum.

=== Milestones ===
A milestone from Carlisle with his name on it suggests that the whole of Roman Britain was in Carausius's grasp. The inscription reads (with expansions in square brackets) "IMP[eratori] C[aesari] M[arco] | AVR[elio] MAVS[aeo] | CARAVSIO P[io] F[elici] | INVICTO AVG[usto]", this translates as "For the Emperor Caesar Marcus Aurelius Mausaeus Carausius Pius Felix Invictus Augustus". The title indicates he considered himself equal to the Tetrarchy's senior emperors (Augusti), rather than their subordinate junior emperors (Caesares). The milestone was reused in about 306, burying the first inscription and adding a new one at the other end, which translates as "For Flavius Valerius Constantinus, most noble Caesar" and refers to Marcus Flavius Valerius Constantius Herculius Augustus (Constantius I). Some more text on the stone, probably a continuation of the Carausius inscription after a gap because it is orientated the same way, was chiselled away, presumably when the stone was reused; the traces remaining suggest it included (translated) "... the Emperor ...".

== In medieval legend ==
In Geoffrey of Monmouth's History of the Kings of Britain (1136) Carausius is a Briton of humble birth, who by his courage persuades the Roman Senate to give him command of a fleet to defend Britain from barbarian attack. Once given the fleet, however, he sails around Britain stirring up unrest and raises an army against Bassianus, the historical Caracalla, here a king of Britain. Carausius defeats Bassianus by persuading his Pictish allies to desert him in exchange for grants of land in Scotland and sets himself up as king. Hearing of Carausius's treachery, the Romans send Allectus to Britain with three legions. Allectus defeats Carausius, kills him, and sets himself up as king in his place.

Hector Boece later built on this to make "Carantius" a Scottish prince, exiled on suspicion of involvement in his brother's murder, who entered Roman service passing himself off as a commoner, and later allied with his nephew King Crathlinthus against the Romans.

Legendary titles
Vacant Interregnum Title last held by Bassianus	King of Britain	Succeeded by Allectus
