= Somerset Archaeological and Natural History Society =

- Abbreviation: SANHS
- Formation: 1849
- Headquarters: Somerset Heritage Centre
- Region served: Historic County of Somerset
- Website: sanhs.org

Somerset Archaeological and Natural History Society (SANHS) is a learned society established in 1849 to encourage the study of archaeology, natural history and history relating to the historic county of Somerset. In 1874 the society acquired Taunton Castle, subsequently restoring and adapting the building for use as a museum, library and venue for meetings. Since 2010 the society's administrative base has been at the Somerset Heritage Centre in Norton Fitzwarren.

During the first half of the 20th century the society expanded its activities under the leadership of Harold St George Gray, whose excavations and curatorial work influenced the development of the collections and raised the society's profile. In 1958 financial pressures led to the leasing of Taunton Castle, with the museum collections, to Somerset County Council (now Somerset Council). The society works collaboratively with Somerset Council and the South West Heritage Trust, and continues its activities through lectures, research, conservation initiatives and publications, as well as through its ownership of Taunton Castle and extensive collections.

== Origins of the society ==
Somerset Archaeological and Natural History Society was founded in 1849 following discussions among several residents of Taunton and its surrounding area. Individuals associated with its establishment and early development included the Revd Francis Warre of Cheddon Fitzpaine, the architect Charles Edmund Giles, and the Revd W. A. Jones of Taunton. The society was one of several comparable organisations established in the west of England during the 19th century, among them Bristol Literary and Philosophical Society (1821), Dorset Natural History and Archaeological Society (1846), and Wiltshire Natural History and Archaeological Society (1853).

The first meeting of the society took place in the Market House, Taunton, on 26 September 1849 and was attended by 350 people. The president, Sir Walter Calverley Trevelyan of Nettlecombe, outlined the society's objectives as the preservation, collection and dissemination of information relating to the county's antiquities and natural history, together with the establishment of a museum and library. By 1851 the society had grown to 420 members and had published the first volume of its annual Proceedings. At the same time it began to assemble museum and library collections.

A temporary museum arranged for the inaugural meeting included parts of a limestone reredos, dating from about 1380, discovered in 1848 in the church of St John the Baptist, Wellington. The reredos was formally presented to the society in 1850.

Initially the society was based in rented premises at the Taunton Literary Institution in the New Market House, Taunton. In 1862 William Bidgood, a farmer's son from Skilgate, was appointed curator, and in 1873 he also assumed the role of assistant secretary. Described as accomplished, intelligent and genial, Bidgood remained a central figure in the society's development until his death in 1901.

== Purchase of Taunton Castle ==
In June 1874 the society acquired Taunton's medieval castle as its headquarters. Historically the castle had served as the administrative centre of the manor of Taunton Deane, owned by the bishops of Winchester, and was notably associated with the Bloody Assizes held there in 1685 following the Monmouth Rebellion. Although parts of the building had been adapted to judges' lodgings in the late 18th century, by the 1870s it was in very poor condition and being offered for sale.

A paper on the history of the castle was presented at the society's annual general meeting in 1872, and soon afterwards a decision was taken to purchase it. Funds were raised by public subscription, including £2,850 for the acquisition itself and further sums for alterations, furniture and fittings. The property comprised the castle's inner bailey and adjacent land, together with two neighbouring buildings known as Ine's Cottage and Castle Lodge.

The Great Chamber of the castle, later known as the Somerset Room, was reroofed in 1884. Between 1899 and 1900 the Great Hall was repaired and adapted for use as the society's principal museum space, and in 1908-1909 the Adam Library was created to accommodate the expanding book collection.

By 1920 membership had reached 1,015, although rising costs led to an increase in the annual subscription to 21s.

== Harold St George Gray ==
Harold St George Gray served as assistant secretary, curator and librarian from 1901 until 1949 and played a central role in the society's activities during that period. He began his career in Wiltshire as assistant to Lt Gen. Augustus Pitt-Rivers and from 1904 worked in Somerset with Arthur Bulleid on the excavation of the Iron Age lake villages at Glastonbury and Meare.

Often assisted by his wife Florence, Gray directed numerous excavations across Somerset, including work at the Iron Age fortifications at Ham Hill and South Cadbury, the lron Age and early Roman site at Kingsdown Camp, and the Norman defences at Castle Neroche. Between 1924 and 1929 he also led excavations in the Keep Gardens at Taunton Castle. The results of this work were reassessed and published in 2016.

In addition to his work in Somerset, Gray undertook excavations at sites including at Arbor Low in Derbyshire and Avebury in Wiltshire. From 1926 to 1929 he worked at Windmill Hill, Avebury, with the archaeologist Alexander Keiller. Reports on many of Gray's excavations appeared in the society's Proceedings and elsewhere.

As curator, Gray was responsible for cataloguing and conserving the museum collections and oversaw several important acquisitions, including of a Middle Bronze Age gold torc discovered at Hendford Hill, Yeovil. Under Gray's supervision, and with funding from William Wyndham, the Wyndham Hall was built in 1927 to provide a venue for lectures and meetings. Further additions to the museum complex before the Second World War, also funded by Wyndham, included a new entrance block and galleries designed by Sir George Oatley to house the lake village collections.

== Later history ==
Following Gray's retirement in 1949, Wilfred Seaby was appointed as his successor. During Seaby's short tenure the collections were returned from wartime storage, the library was reorganised and additional office accommodation was created. In 1952 major repairs to the castle began, focusing on the Great Hall, and by the end of the year negotiations had been completed for bringing the recently-discovered Low Ham Roman mosaic to the museum.

Although visitor numbers and educational use increased during the mid-20th century, financial pressures also intensified. Castle Lodge and Ine's Cottage were sold, and in 1958 the society ended its direct management of the museum by leasing Taunton Castle, together with the museum collections, to Somerset County Council. Since 2014 responsibility for the management of the museum and the collections has rested with the South West Heritage Trust.

The society was a partner with Somerset County Council in a major project, supported by the Heritage Lottery Fund, to refurbish and redisplay the museum. It reopened in 2011 as the Museum of Somerset. In 2013 the society worked with Somerset Buildings Preservation Trust and the County Council on a Lottery-funded project to repair Castle House, part of the Taunton Castle complex. A further project to conserve Castle Gardens was completed in 2021.

In 2022 the society resumed control of the Wyndham Hall and began a programme of repair and refurbishment. The hall is now used for society events and is also hired by other organisations, including for film sceenings.

While retaining a presence at Taunton Castle, the society's headquarters have been based since 2010 at the Somerset Heritage Centre, Norton Fitzwarren. Built by Somerset County Council for its heritage services, the centre is now managed by the South West Heritage Trust and houses extensive reserve and reference collections belonging to the society.

== Museum collection ==
The society began assembling museum collections soon after its foundation. Active collecting largely came to an end in 1958 when responsibility for the museum was transferred to Somerset County Council.

The geological collection contains approximately 40,000 rocks, minerals, and fossils, largely originating from Somerset and neighbouring counties. Among its most notable elements is an Ice Age mammal collection containing about 18,000 fossils from the Mendip caves and other sites. The biological collection contains about 250,000 specimens, encompassing birds, mammals, insects, shells, and plants. The herbarium contains over 30,000 specimens, including material gathered by the 19th-century botanists Hewett C. Watson and Isabella Gifford.

The archaeological collection ranges from the Palaeolithic to the 19th century. It includes material from the Glastonbury and Meare lake villages and from excavations throughout Somerset, including at Ham Hill and South Cadbury. Individual objects of note include the Low Ham and East Coker Roman mosaics, the Kewstoke reliquary, the Wellington reredos, and artefacts associated with the Monmouth Rebellion.

The textile collection contains over 2,000 examples of lace, much of it collected by Miss Babcock. The collection of Somerset-made ceramics includes examples from Donyatt, Brislington and Wincanton, as well as of Elton ware and other craft pottery.

The museum collection formerly contained a significant amount of ethnographic material, including objects given by Frederick Thomas Elworthy and Edward Burnett Tylor. While most of this material was transferred to other museums in the 1940s, a small collection was retained.

== Library and archive collections ==
The society's library holds approximately 18,000 books and pamphlets, among them more than 500 dating from the 17th century and over 3,000 volumes assembled by Charles Tite. It also includes extensive runs of periodicals. A significant modern addition is the library and photographic slide collection bequeathed by the archaeologist Mick Aston.

The library collection holds thousands of Somerset watercolours and other illustrations by artists including Samuel Hieronymus Grimm, Francis Danby, Samuel Jackson, John Buckler, John Chessell Buckler and William Walter Wheatley. Most were commissioned by John Hugh Smyth-Piggot and George Weare Braikenridge.

The society also assembled an extensive archive, in part to support the preparation of a comprehensive history of Somerset. Early acquisitions included a charter attributed to King Ine, dated AD 705, and large quantities of material rescued from the Diocesan Registry at Wells. Among other acquisitions were cartularies, manorial records, maps and parish records. From 1935 onwards the archive was transferred to the Somerset Record Office and is now preserved at the Somerset Heritage Centre.

== Governance and activities ==
The society completed the process of becoming a Charitable Incorporated Organisation in 2025. Its aims are to advance the study of archaeology, natural history and history, particularly in relation to the historic county of Somerset. These aims are pursued through publications, digital resources, grant giving, and a programme of talks and events. The society is governed by a board of trustees, supported by specialist committees concerned with archaeology, natural history, local history, historic buildings, publications, and the library.

Since 1851 the Society has published its annual Proceedings, which contain scholarly papers on the archaeology, history and ecology of Somerset. The volumes are available online.

== Prominent people ==
The landscape archaeologist Mick Aston, who achieved prominence through appearances on the television programme Time Team, served as president of the society. He left it a legacy and his personal library. In his memory the society helped to establish Mick Aston's Young Archaeologists (MAYA), a club for young archaeologists that later became an independent organisation.

Robin Bush, the archivist and historian, served as chairman of the society in 1983-1984.
