= Church without dedication, High Ham =

Church in Somerset, England

Church without dedication
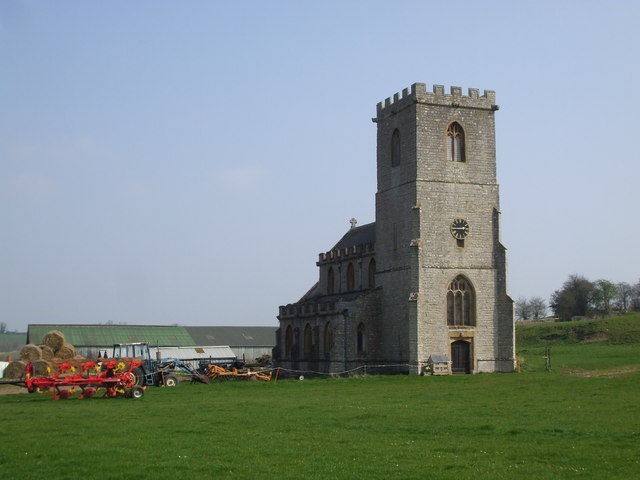

- Location within Somerset
- 51°03′30″N 02°48′40″W
- Location: Low Ham, High Ham, Somerset, England

History
- Built: 17th century

Listed Building – Grade I
- Official name: Church in the Field
- Designated: 17 April 1959
- Reference no.: 1346080

The Church without dedication (also known as Church in the Field) at Low Ham in the parish of High Ham, Somerset, England was formerly a private chapel to the manor. It stands on the site of an earlier church, and was started in the early 17th century, damaged in the English Civil War, and completed in 1690. It has been designated as a Grade I listed building.

== History ==
The church was built around 1600, on the site of an earlier church, which was probably in existence in the 13th century, but may have been built by Serlo de Burci.

The new church was built by Sir Edward Hext and completed by Baron Stawell to be the chapel for a new manor house, however the house was never completed. The gateway which was built was moved to Hazlegrove House.

== Architecture ==
The church was built of local stone with Hamstone dressings, in a Gothic style. It has a three-bay nave and two-bay chancel. The three stage tower has corner buttresses and gargoyles. It contains two bells one of which was cast before 1350 and the other around 1500. There are still some remnants of 15th century stained glass in the windows. The windows have decorative tracery.

The interior includes monuments to Sir Edward Hext and to several generations of the Stawell family. There is a wooden chancel screen and a stone screen which was brought from St Mark's Church, Bristol. The pulpit is Jacobean.

The parish of High Ham is within the Langport Area Team Ministry benefice which is part of the Diocese of Bath and Wells.

== See also ==
- List of Grade I listed buildings in South Somerset
- List of towers in Somerset
