= Low Ham =

Human settlement in Somerset, England

Coordinates: 51.0600°N 2.8110°W

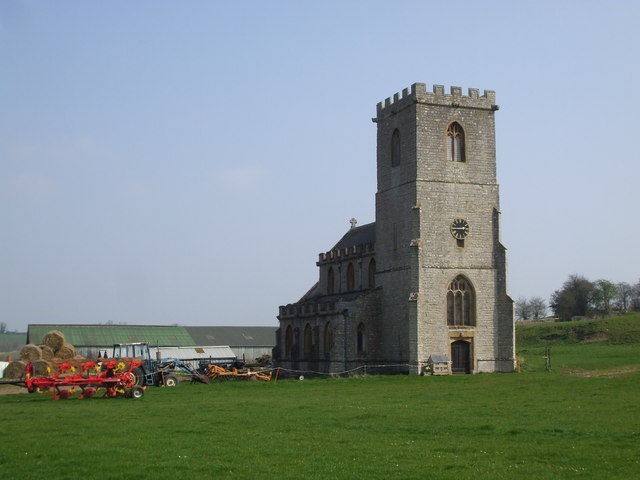
- Church without dedication, Low Ham

- Location within Somerset
- OS grid reference: ST432292
- Unitary authority: Somerset Council
- Ceremonial county: Somerset
- Region: South West
- Country: England
- Sovereign state: United Kingdom
- Post town: LANGPORT
- Postcode district: TA10 9
- Dialling code: 01458
- Police: Avon and Somerset
- Fire: Devon and Somerset
- Ambulance: South Western
- UK Parliament: Glastonbury and Somerton

Low Ham is a village in the civil parish of High Ham in the English county of Somerset.

At the time of the Domesday Book Low Ham was part of the estate of Serlo de Burcy, and was later known as Ham Burcy and Nether Ham.

== Roman villa ==
There is evidence of occupation from Roman times with a large Roman villa which was excavated in 1946. The bath block contained a 4th-century mosaic showing the story of Aeneas and Dido. It is the earliest piece of narrative art in the country and is a unique find from Roman Britain.

== Church ==
English Heritage lists a church, without dedication to any saint, on the site of an earlier church, which was started in the early 17th century, and damaged in the Civil War, and completed in 1690. It is a Grade I listed building.

In the 17th century the local Lord of the manor, Baron Stawell, intended to build a palatial mansion next to the church but it was never completed. The original gateway was moved to Hazelgrove House (now Hazlegrove Preparatory School) in the early 19th century.

== Site of Special Scientific Interest ==
Low Ham
- Site of Special Scientific Interest
- Location of Low Ham.
- Area of search: Somerset
- Grid reference: ST440290
- Interest: Geological
- Area: 5 ha (12 acres)
- Notification date: 1988
- Location map: English Nature

The Low Ham SSSI at grid reference ST440290, lies on lowest slopes of Woodbirds Hill in the adjoining civil parish of Pitney, just above the Low Ham Rhyne. It is a 12.4 acres (5.0 ha) geological Site of Special Scientific Interest in Somerset, notified in 1988. It is a Geological Conservation Review site.

This site contains a Pleistocene sedimentary sequence of sands, silts and peats, laid down in the Early Devensian. The site forms a rare example of deposits of 'interstadial' facies associated with a high sea level; these are of critical importance for British Pleistocene geology.
