= Corona Station (pastoral lease) =

Pastoral lease in New South Wales

Coordinates: 31.291°S 141.444°E

Location in New South Wales

Corona Station is a pastoral lease that operates as a sheep station in the outback of New South Wales, Australia.

It is situated about 74 kilometres (46 mi) north of Broken Hill and 164 kilometres (102 mi) west of White Cliffs. Corona is one of the four original stations in the Barrier Range settled through the early 1870s along with Mount Gipps, Mundi Mundi and Alberta Stations. The station currently occupies an area of 52,000 acres (21,044 ha) and is able to carry a flock of about 13,000 sheep.

== History ==
Daniel Harvey Patterson acquired Corona in 1875 along with Menamurtree station near Wilcannia. Patterson soon took an interest in the Broken Hill mine and later became a director and chairman of BHP. By 1883 the owners had spent £75,374 on improvements.

Corona produced over 2,090 bales of wool in 1890.

Patterson sold off his pastoral interests including Corona in 1894. During the depression of the 1890s, with falling wool prices and drought, many of the properties in the area including Corona, Sturts Meadows, Mount Arrowsmith, Langwirra, Elsinora and Thurloo Downs fell into the hands of finance companies. Corona was acquired by Goldsbrough Mort & Co.

The Corona Pastoral Company sold the property in 1911 to Messrs. T. L. Browne and H. H. Dutton. The station was stocked at this time with a flock of 60,000 sheep, 280 cattle and 190 horses. In 1912 when shearing was in full swing the men went on strike over a butter allowance, which was not resolved until an Australian Workers' Union representative travelled to Corona to settle the strike.

Sidney Kidman acquired the property in 1917.

In 1925 Corona had a flock of over 42,000 sheep.

In the 1930s leases in the area were adjusted to give owners financial certainty so long as part of the lease was surrendered. Kidman did not exercise this option and the leasehold remained the same.

Fowler's Gap, which now operates as a research station, was an out-station of Corona until 1947 when it was resumed and became a station in its own right.

In 1995 the property was fully stocked with 13,000 head of sheep.

Soft Rolling Skin sheep were introduced to Corona in 2001 by Peter and Tracy Botten, who owned the station at the time. In the drought of 2002 the flock was down to about 300. By 2005 the wool price was over A$200 a bale more than previous years and the flock was approximately 6,500.

In 2013 the station was still owned by the Bottens, who were running 7,000 sheep on the property. Corona was awarded organic certification earlier the same year. It was gained in two years rather than the normal three, because the Bottens had not used chemicals for the previous three years prior to starting certification. As a result, the wool clip attained prices or up to A$1 per kilogram of wool and were fetching up to A$1,050 per bale.

== See also ==
- List of ranches and stations
