= Cadbury Castle, Somerset =

Hillfort in Somerset, England

Cadbury Castle
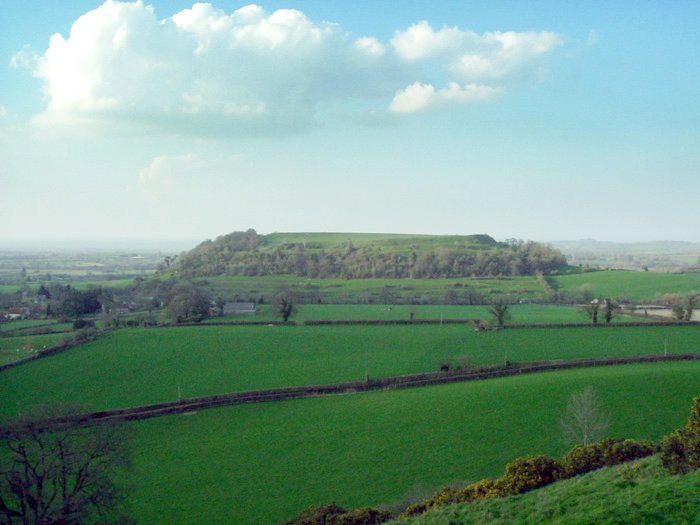

- Location of the site in Somerset
- 51°01′27″N 2°31′54″W
- Type: Hillfort
- Periods: Iron Age
- Location: Near South Cadbury and Yeovil, Somerset, England

Site notes
- Condition: Some damage

Cadbury Castle is a Bronze and Iron Age hillfort in the parish of South Cadbury in the English county of Somerset. It is a scheduled monument and has been associated with King Arthur's legendary court at Camelot.

The hillfort is formed by a 7.28 hectares (18.0 acres) plateau surrounded by ramparts on the surrounding slopes of the limestone Cadbury Hill. The site has been excavated in the late 19th and early 20th century by James Bennett and Harold St George Gray. More recent examination of the site was conducted in the 1960s by Leslie Alcock and since 1992 by the South Cadbury Environs Project. These have revealed artifacts from human occupation and use from the Neolithic through the Bronze and Iron Ages. The site was reused by the Roman forces and again from c. 470 until some time after 580. In the 11th century, it temporarily housed a Saxon mint. Evidence of various buildings at the site has been unearthed, including a "Great Hall", round and rectangular house foundations, metalworking, and a possible sequence of small rectangular temples or shrines.

== Etymology ==
The suffix -bury (from byrig, an Anglo-Saxon word meaning "fort" or "town") is frequently, but not exclusively, used to refer to hillforts. The first part of the name may come from the River Cam, as with the nearby villages of West Camel and Queen Camel. Other scholars suggest a derivation from some figure named "Cador" or "Cada". It is one of three sites in Somerset to include the Cadbury name, the others being Cadbury Camp, near Tickenham, and Cadbury Hill, which is also known as Cadbury-Congresbury to distinguish it from the other sites.

== Background ==
Hillforts developed in the Late Bronze and Early Iron ages, around the start of the 1st millennium BC. The reason for their emergence in prehistoric Britain and their purpose has been a subject of debate. It has been argued that they could have been military sites constructed in response to invasion from continental Europe, sites built by invaders, or a military reaction to social tensions caused by an increasing population and consequent pressure on agriculture. The dominant view since the 1960s has been that the increasing use of iron led to social changes in Britain. Deposits of iron ore were located in different places from the tin and copper ore necessary to make bronze and, as a result, trading patterns shifted. The old elites lost their economic and social status and power passed into the hands of a new group of people.

Archaeologist Barry Cunliffe believes that population increase still played a role and has stated that

the forts provided defensive possibilities for the community at those times when the stress of an increasing population burst out into open warfare. But I would not see them as having been built because there was a state of war. They would be functional as defensive strongholds when there were tensions and undoubtedly some of them were attacked and destroyed, but this was not the only, or even the most significant, factor in their construction.

== Location ==
Cadbury Castle is located 5 miles (8.0 km) north east of Yeovil. It stands on the summit of Cadbury Hill, a limestone hill situated on the southern edge of the Somerset Levels, with flat lowland to the north. The summit is 153 m (500 ft) above sea-level on lias stone.

The hill is surrounded by terraced earthwork banks and ditches and a stand of trees. On the north west and south sides there are four ramparts, with two remaining on the east. The summit plateau covers 7.28 hectares (18.0 acres), and is surrounded by the inner bank which is 1.2 kilometres (0.75 mi) long. The hillfort is overlooked by Sigwells, a rural plateau rich in archaeological remains. Due to scrub and tree growth the site has been added to the Heritage at Risk Register. Further information on the dig and hillfort can be found a short walk down the road on Somerset Heritage Panels which have been erected in the local pub The Camelot Inn.

== History ==
=== Early occupation of the site ===
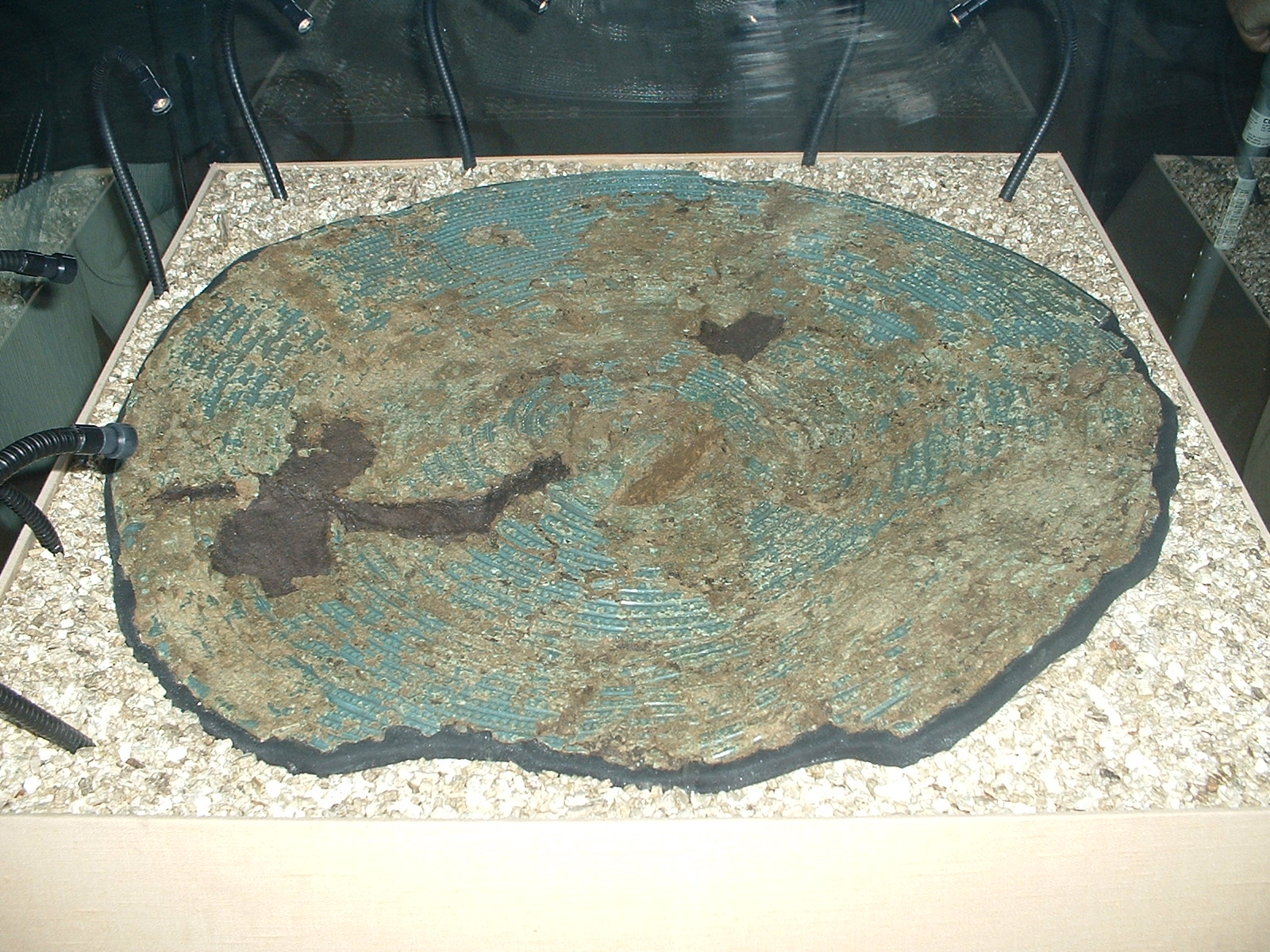
Yetholm-type shield from South Cadbury. Displayed at the Museum of Somerset, Taunton.

The earliest settlement on the site is represented by pits and post holes dated with Neolithic pottery and flints. These are the remains of a small agricultural settlement which was unenclosed. Bones recovered from the site have been radiocarbon dated to 3500 and 3300 BC. A bank under the later Iron Age defences is likely to be a lynchet or terrace derived from early ploughing of the hilltop. The site was also occupied in the Late Bronze Age, from which ovens have been identified. Radical revisions of the Bronze Age archaeology on the lower slopes resulted from discoveries during excavations and survey work by the South Cadbury Environs Project. Finds include the first Bronze Age shield from an excavation in northwest Europe, an example of the distinctive Yetholm-type. The shield dates from the period 1350–1150 BC. A metal-working building and associated enclosure were discovered 2 km (1.2 mi) south east of the hillfort, roughly contemporary with the period of manufacture. Some of the diagnostic pottery for the early phases of the site were discovered by Mary Harfield.

Human occupation continued throughout the Iron Age. A stone enclosure was constructed around 300 BC with timber revetting, and ploughing ceased within the hilltop site. Excavations have shown the signs of four and six post rectangular buildings which were gradually replaced with roundhouses. Large ramparts and elaborate timber defences were constructed and refortified over the following centuries. Excavation revealed round and rectangular house foundations, metalworking, and a possible sequence of small rectangular temples or shrines of Celtic polytheism, indicating permanent oppidum-like occupation. Excavations were undertaken by local clergyman James Bennett in 1890 and Harold St George Gray in 1913, followed by major work led by archaeologist Leslie Alcock from 1966 to 1970. He identified a long sequence of occupation on the site and many of the finds are displayed in the Museum of Somerset in Taunton. The finds from the Late Bronze Age to the Early Iron Age, exploring the ramparts and southwestern gate structure, represent one of the deepest and most complex Iron Age stratigraphic sequences excavated in southern Britain.

=== Hillfort ===
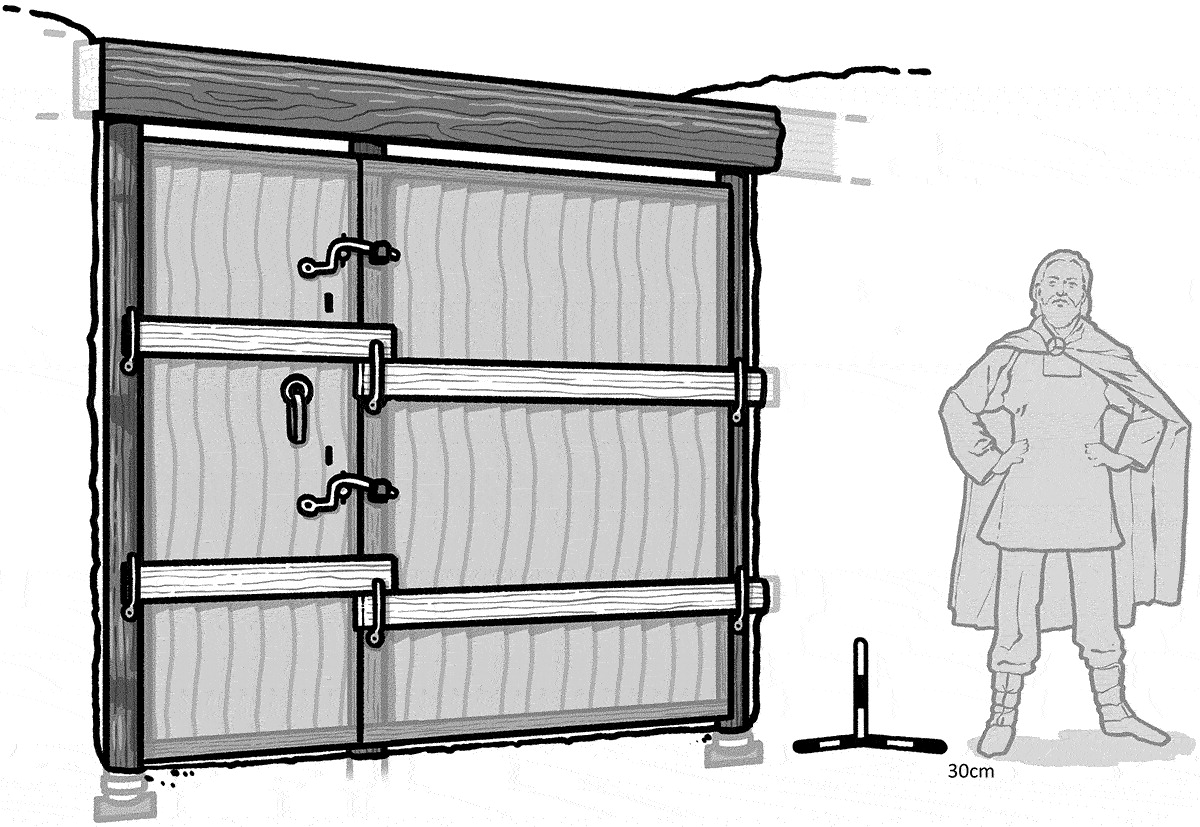
Reconstruction of an Iron Age gate at Cadbury Castle

During the first century BC, additional lines of bank and ditch were constructed, turning it into a hillfort which is now known as the castle. There is evidence that the fort was violently taken around AD 43 and that the defences were further slighted later in the first century after the construction of a Roman army barracks on the hilltop. Excavations of the southwest gate in 1968 and 1969 revealed evidence for one or more severe violent episodes associated with weaponry and destruction by fire. Leslie Alcock believed this to have been dated to around AD 70, whereas Richard Tabor argues for a date associated with the initial invasion around AD 43 or 44. Michael Havinden states that it was the site of vigorous resistance by the Durotriges and Dobunni to the second Augusta Legion under the command of Vespasian. There was significant activity at the site during the late third and fourth centuries, which may have included the construction of a Romano-British temple.

=== Post-Roman occupation ===
Following the withdrawal of the Roman administration, the site is thought to have been in use from c. 470 until some time after 580. Alcock revealed a substantial "Great Hall" 20 by 10 metres (66 ft × 33 ft) and showed that the innermost Iron Age defences had been refortified, providing a defended site double the size of any other known fort of the period. Shards of pottery from the eastern Mediterranean were also found from this period, indicating wide trade links. It therefore seems probable that it was the chief fort of a major Brythonic ruler, with his family, his warband, servants, and horses. Between 1010 and 1020, the hill was reoccupied for use as a temporary Saxon mint, standing in for that at Ilchester.

=== Medieval period ===
According to the Domesday Book, Cadbury Castle appears to have been part of the feudal barony of North Cadbury held by Turstin FitzRolf in 1086. Some small-scale fortification of the site may also have occurred in the 13th century.

== Arthurian interpretation ==
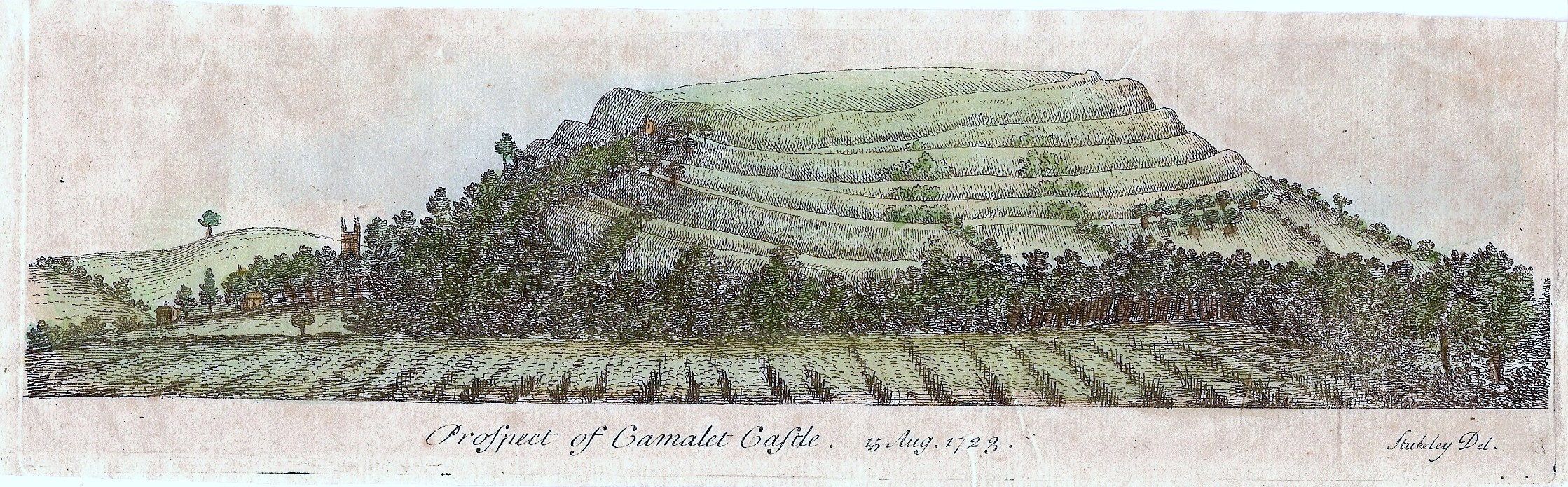
Engraving of Cadbury Castle, drawn in 1723 by William Stukeley and captioned "Prospect of Camalet Castle"

Local tradition, first written down by John Leland in 1542, holds that Cadbury Castle was King Arthur's Camelot. The site and the Great Hall are extensive, and the writer Geoffrey Ashe argued that it was the base for the Arthur of history. His opinion has not been widely accepted by students of the period.

Militarily, the location makes sense as a place where refugees and the southwestern Brythons of Dumnonia could have defended themselves against attacks from the east. If Arthur was indeed conceived at Tintagel, as tradition asserts, he may have been a prince of Dumnonia and used Cadbury as a stronghold on his eastern frontier.

== South Cadbury Environs Project ==
Recent work on the archaeology of the site and the surrounding area has been carried out by the South Cadbury Environs Project. Since 1992 the project team, which included local volunteers South East Somerset Archaeological and Historical Society and the Yeovil Archaeology and Local History Society, have carried out geophysical surveys including gradiometry and electrical resistivity tomography, ploughzone (disturbed topsoil) sampling, test pits, deeper excavations and geographic information system (GIS) approaches. The project had input from academics and archaeologists from the universities of Bristol, Glasgow, Birmingham and Oxford, funded by the Leverhulme Trust and Arts and Humanities Research Council. The project studies the castle and surrounding area up to 8 kilometres (5.0 mi) away, using landscape sampling,

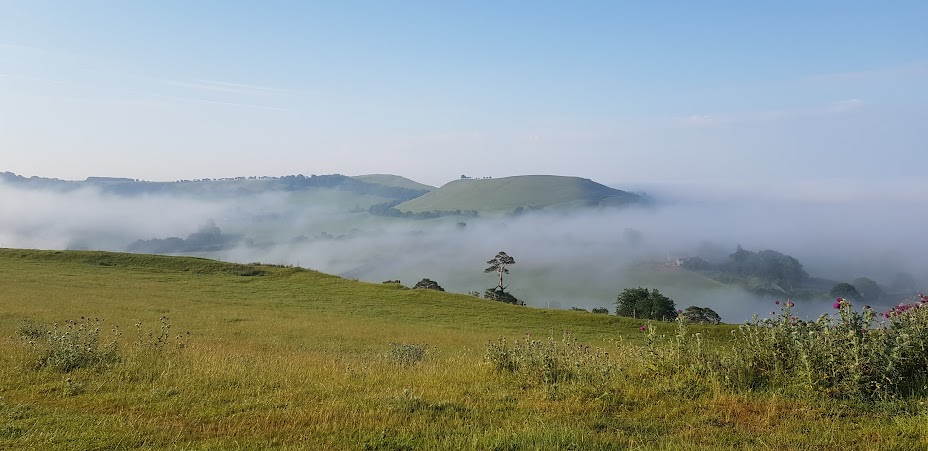
View from the hill

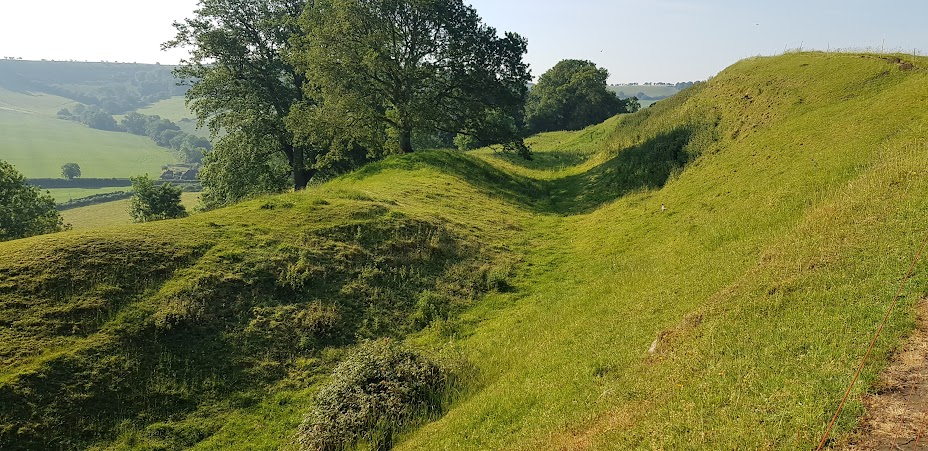
Westerly earthworks and rampart defences

== See also ==
- List of hillforts and ancient settlements in Somerset
- List of scheduled monuments in South Somerset
- History of Somerset
- Tintagel Castle

== Bibliography ==
- Adkins, Lesley; Adkins, Roy (1992). A Field Guide to Somerset Archaeology. Wimborne, Dorset: Dovecote Press. ISBN 978-0946159949.
- Alcock, Leslie (1972). Was that Camelot? Excavations at Cadbury Castle 1966–70. London: Thames and Hudson. ISBN 978-0812815054.
- Aston, Michael; Burrow, Ian (1991). The Archaeology of Somerset. Somerset County Council. ISBN 978-0861830282.
- Barrett, John; Freeman, P. W. M.; Woodward, Ann, eds. (2000). Cadbury Castle, Somerset: The Late Prehistoric and Early Historic Archaeology. English Heritage. ISBN 978-1850747161.
- Barrett, John (2000). "Writing the Iron Age" (PDF). In Barrett, John; Freeman, P. W. M.; Woodward, Ann (eds.). Cadbury Castle, Somerset: The Late Prehistoric and Early Historic Archaeology. English Heritage. ISBN 978-1850747161.
- Bush, Robin (1994). Somerset: The complete guide. Wimborne: The Dovecote Press Ltd. ISBN 978-1874336266.
- Dunning, Robert (1995). Somerset Castles. Somerset: Somerset Books. ISBN 978-0861832781.
- Dunning, Robert (2003). A History of Somerset. Chichester: Phillimore & Co. ISBN 978-0861834761.
- Ekwall, Eilert (1960). The Concise Oxford Dictionary of English Place Names. Oxford University Press. ISBN 978-0-19-869103-7.
- Haslett, Simon K. (2010). Somerset Landscapes: Geology and landforms. Usk: Blackbarn Books. ISBN 9781456416317.
- Havinden, Michael (1981). The Somerset Landscape. The making of the English landscape. London: Hodder and Stoughton. ISBN 978-0340201169.
- Leach, Peter (2001). Roman Somerset. Dovecote Press. ISBN 978-1874336938.
- Metcalf, David Michael (1998). An Atlas of Anglo-Saxon and Norman Coin Finds, C.973-1086. Ashmolean Museum. ISBN 9781854441102.
- Payne, Andrew; Corney, Mark; Cunliffe, Barry (2007). The Wessex Hillforts Project: Extensive Survey of Hillfort Interiors in Central Southern England. English Heritage. ISBN 978-1-873592-85-4.
- Reno, Frank D. (1996). The Historic King Arthur: Authenticating the Celtic Hero of Post-Roman Britain. McFarland. p. 205. ISBN 9780786402663. "Arthur prince of Dumnonia Cadbury."
- Sharples, Niall M (1991). English Heritage Book of Maiden Castle. London: B. T. Batsford. ISBN 978-0713460834.
- Tabor, Richard (2008). Cadbury Castle: The hillfort and landscapes. Stroud: The History Press. ISBN 978-0-7524-4715-5.
