= Timeline of Somerset history =

Key dates in the history of Somerset

- 43–47 – Roman invasion and occupation
- 491 – Battle of Mons Badonicus (may have been fought in Somerset) (uncertain date)
- 537 – Battle of Camlann (sometimes located at Queen Camel) (uncertain date)
- 577 – Battle of Deorham (Dyrham, Gloucestershire) – Saxons occupied Bath
- 658 – Battle of Peonnum (Penselwood ?) – Saxons then occupied most of Somerset
- 710 – Battle of Llongborth (? Langport)
- 845 – First documentary reference to "Somersæte"
- 878 – Battle of Cynwit – Saxon victory over the Danes by Ealdorman Odda
- 878 – Battle of Ethandun – West Saxon victory over the Danes (uncertain whether in Somerset or Wiltshire)
- 878 – Treaty of Wedmore – after defeat of Danes by King Alfred the Great
- c900 – Kings of Wessex hold court at Cheddar
- 973 – King Edgar of England crowned at Bath
- 988 – St Dunstan buried at Glastonbury
- 1013 – Danish king Sweyn Forkbeard received submission of western thegns at Bath
- 1088 – Siege of Ilchester
- 1191 – Discovery of "King Arthur's" tomb at Glastonbury
- 1497 – Perkin Warbeck's rebellion supported by Somerset men
- 1643 – Battle of Lansdowne
- 1645 – Siege of Taunton during the English Civil War
- 1685 – Battle of Sedgemoor – Duke of Monmouth defeated
- 1685 – Judge Jeffries holds the "Bloody Assizes" at Taunton
- 1770 – Start of major enclosures of Somerset Levels
- 1805 – Somerset Coal Canal Opened
- 1827 – Bridgwater and Taunton Canal opened
- 1875 – Formation of Somerset County Cricket Club
- 1898 – County boundaries altered
- 1956 – Chew Valley Lake opened by Queen Elizabeth II
- 1974 – Formation of County of Avon, reducing the area of the County of Somerset
- 1996 – Abolition of the County of Avon, creating the unitary authorities of North Somerset and Bath and North East Somerset
