= Limebreach Wood =

Woodland in Somerset, England

Coordinates: 51.44985°N 2.76984°W

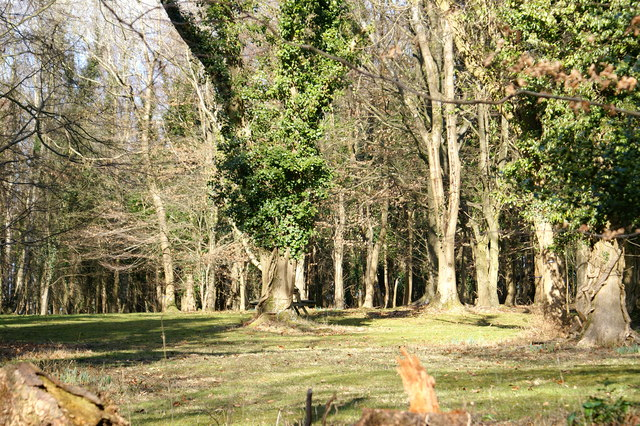
- Interactive map of Limebreach Wood

Geography
- Location: North Somerset, England

Ecology
- Lesser flora: Limacella ochraceolutea, Tilia cordata
- Fauna: Salebriopsis albicilla

Limebreach Wood (sometimes written as Lime Breach Wood) is a woodland on the south side of the Tickenham Ridge, between Clevedon and Bristol. It is very close to the site of Cadbury Camp.

It is an ancient woodland, with a high proportion of Small-leaved Lime trees. The mushroom-forming fungi Limacella ochraceolutea is found in the wood.

Part of the wood is managed as a nature reserve by Avon Wildlife Trust.

The pyralid moth Salebriopsis albicilla occurs here.
