= History of Somerset =

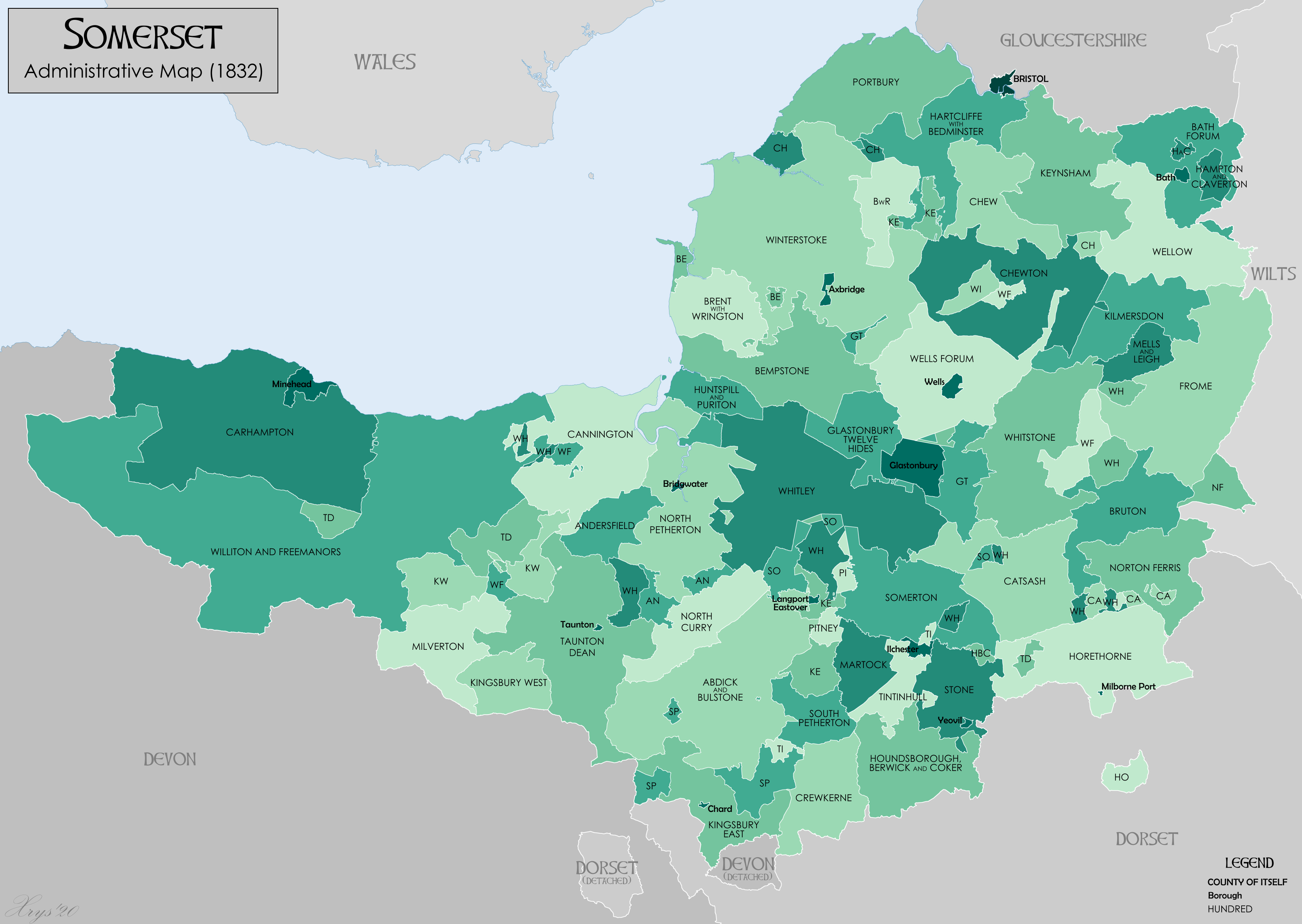
Ancient County of Somerset

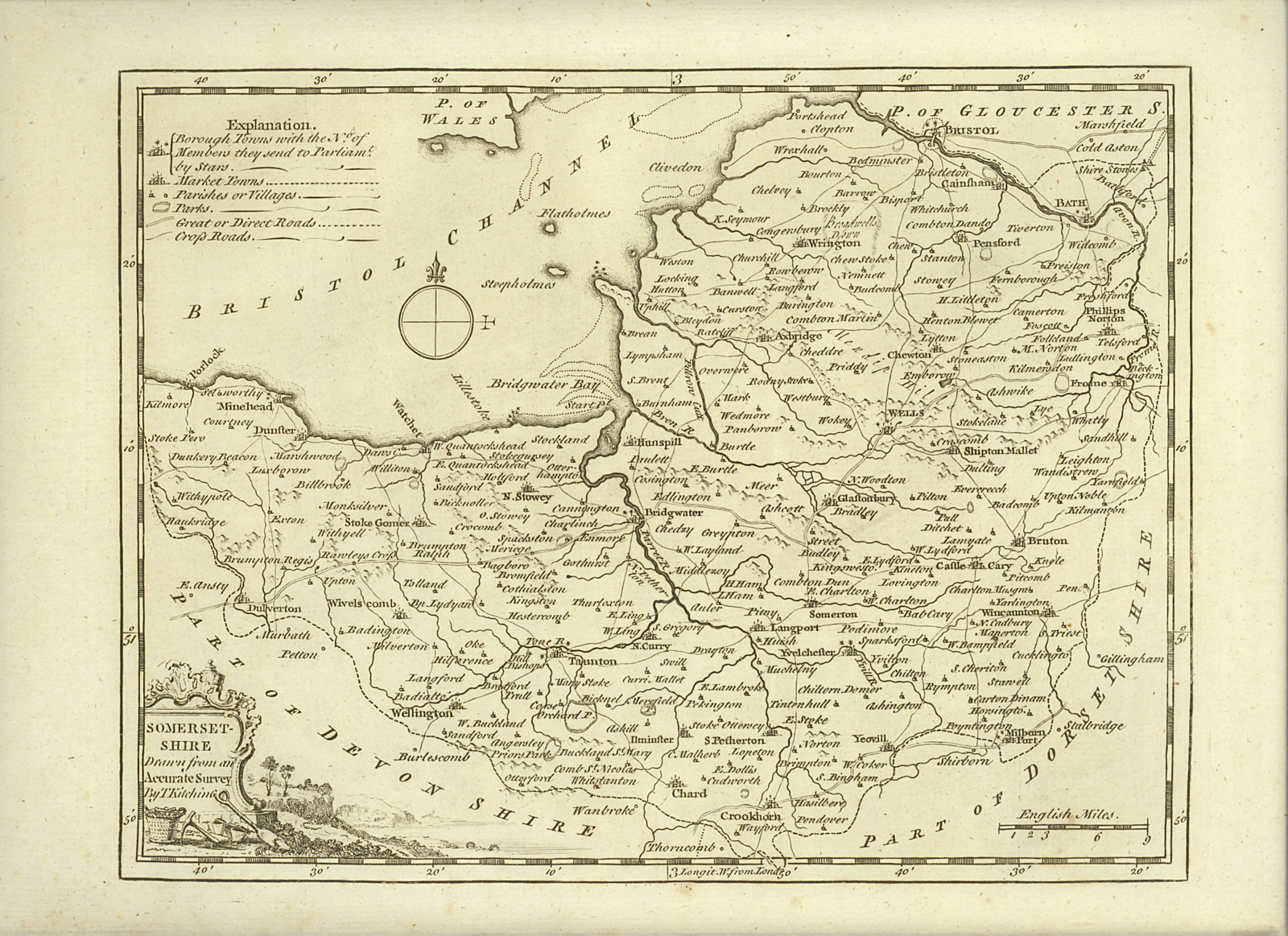
Map of "Somersetshire" from 1786, from: Boswell, Henry: "The Antiquities of England and Wales" (1786)

Somerset is a historic county in the south west of England. There is evidence of human occupation since prehistoric times with hand axes and flint points from the Palaeolithic and Mesolithic eras, and a range of burial mounds, hill forts and other artefacts dating from the Neolithic, Bronze and Iron Ages. The oldest dated human road work in Great Britain is the Sweet Track, constructed across the Somerset Levels with wooden planks in the 39th century BCE.

Following the Roman Empire's invasion of southern Britain, the mining of lead and silver in the Mendip Hills provided a basis for local industry and commerce. Bath became the site of a major Roman fort and city, the remains of which can still be seen. During the Early Medieval period Somerset was the scene of battles between the Anglo-Saxons and first the Britons and later the Danes. In this period it was ruled first by various kings of Wessex, and later by kings of England. Following the defeat of the Anglo-Saxon monarchy by the Normans in 1066, castles were built in Somerset.

Expansion of the population and settlements in the county continued during the Tudor and more recent periods. Agriculture and coal mining expanded until the 18th century, although other industries declined during the industrial revolution. In modern times the population has grown, particularly in the seaside towns, notably Weston-super-Mare. Agriculture continues to be a major business, if no longer a major employer because of mechanisation. Light industries are based in towns such as Bridgwater and Yeovil. The towns of Taunton and Shepton Mallet manufacture cider, although the acreage of apple orchards is less than it once was.

== Palaeolithic and Mesolithic ==
The Palaeolithic and Mesolithic periods saw hunter-gatherers move into the region of Somerset. There is evidence from flint artefacts in a quarry at Westbury that an ancestor of modern man, possibly Homo heidelbergensis, was present in the area from around 500,000 years ago. There is still some doubt about whether the artefacts are of human origin but they have been dated within Oxygen Isotope Stage 13 (524,000 – 478,000 BP). Other experts suggest that "many of the bone-rich Middle Pleistocene deposits belong to a single but climatically variable interglacial that succeeded the Cromerian, perhaps about 500,000 years ago. Detailed analysis of the origin and modification of the flint artefacts leads to the conclusion that the assemblage was probably a product of geomorphological processes rather than human work, but a single cut-marked bone suggests a human presence." Animal bones and artefacts unearthed in the 1980s at Westbury-sub-Mendip, in Somerset, have shown evidence of early human activity approximately 700,000 years ago.

Homo sapiens sapiens, or modern man, came to Somerset during the Early Upper Palaeolithic. There is evidence of occupation of four Mendip caves 35,000 to 30,000 years ago. During the Last Glacial Maximum, about 25,000 to 15,000 years ago, it is probable that Somerset was deserted as the area experienced tundra conditions. Evidence was found in Gough's Cave of deposits of human bone dating from around 12,500 years ago. The bones were defleshed and probably ritually buried though perhaps related to cannibalism being practised in the area at the time or making skull cups or storage containers. Somerset was one of the first areas of future England settled following the end of Younger Dryas phase of the last ice age c. 8000 BC. Cheddar Man is the name given to the remains of a human male found in Gough's Cave in Cheddar Gorge. He is Britain's oldest complete human skeleton. The remains date from about 7150 BC, and it appears that he died a violent death. Somerset is thought to have been occupied by Mesolithic hunter-gatherers from about 6000 BCE; Mesolithic artefacts have been found in more than 70 locations. Mendip caves were used as burial places, with between 50 and 100 skeletons being found in Aveline's Hole. In the Neolithic era, from about 3500 BCE, there is evidence of farming.

At the end of the last ice age the Bristol Channel was dry land. However, the sea level later rose, particularly between 1220 and 900 BC and between 800 and 470 BCE, resulting in major coastal changes. The Somerset Levels became flooded, but the dry points such as Glastonbury and Brent Knoll have a long history of settlement, and are known to have been occupied by Mesolithic hunters. The county has prehistoric burial mounds (such as Stoney Littleton Long Barrow), stone rows (such as the circles at Stanton Drew and Priddy) and settlement sites. Evidence of Mesolithic occupation has come both from the upland areas, such as in Mendip caves, and from the low land areas such as the Somerset Levels. Dry points in the latter such as Glastonbury Tor and Brent Knoll, have a long history of settlement with wooden trackways between them. There were also "lake villages" in the marsh such as those at Glastonbury Lake Village and Meare. One of the oldest dated human road work in Britain is the Sweet Track, constructed across the Somerset Levels with wooden planks in the 39th century BC, partially on the route of the even earlier Post Track.

== Neolithic, Bronze and Iron Ages ==
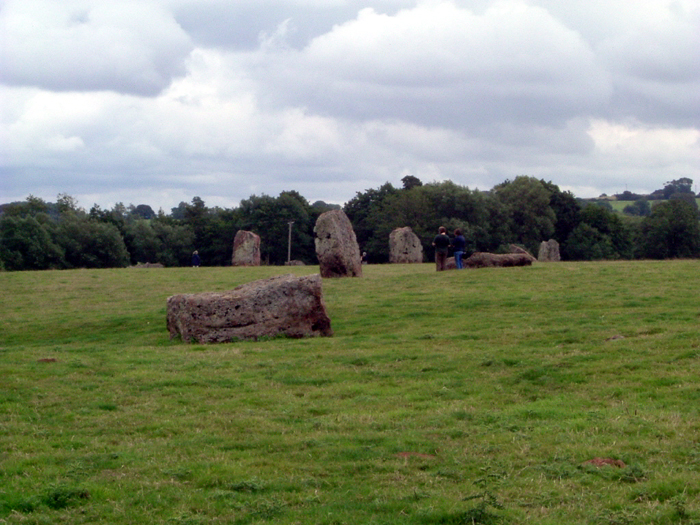
Stanton Drew stone circles

There is evidence of Exmoor's human occupation from Mesolithic times onwards. In the Neolithic period people started to manage animals and grow crops on farms cleared from the woodland, rather than act purely as hunter gatherers. It is also likely that extraction and smelting of mineral ores to make tools, weapons, containers and ornaments in bronze and then iron started in the late Neolithic and into the Bronze and Iron Ages.

The caves of the Mendip Hills were settled during the Neolithic period and contain extensive archaeological sites such as those at Cheddar Gorge. There are numerous Iron Age Hill Forts, which were later reused in the Dark Ages, such as Cadbury Castle, Worlebury Camp and Ham Hill. The age of the henge monument at Stanton Drew stone circles is unknown, but is believed to be from the Neolithic period. There is evidence of mining on the Mendip Hills back into the late Bronze Age when there were technological changes in metal working indicated by the use of lead. There are numerous "hill forts", such as Small Down Knoll, Solsbury Hill, Dolebury Warren and Burledge Hill, which seem to have had domestic purposes, not just a defensive role. They generally seem to have been occupied intermittently from the Bronze Age onward, some, such as Cadbury Camp at South Cadbury, being refurbished during different eras. Battlegore Burial Chamber is a Bronze Age burial chamber at Williton which is composed of three round barrows and possibly a long, chambered barrow.

The Iron Age tribes of later Somerset were the Dobunni in north Somerset, Durotriges in south Somerset and Dumnonii in west Somerset. The first and second produced coins, the finds of which allows their tribal areas to be suggested, but the latter did not. All three had a Celtic culture and language. However, Ptolemy stated that Bath was in the territory of the Belgae, but this may be a mistake. The Celtic gods were worshipped at the temple of Sulis at Bath and possibly the temple on Brean Down. Iron Age sites on the Quantock Hills, include major hill forts at Dowsborough and Ruborough, as well as smaller earthwork enclosures, such as Trendle Ring, Elworthy Barrows and Plainsfield Camp.

== Roman ==
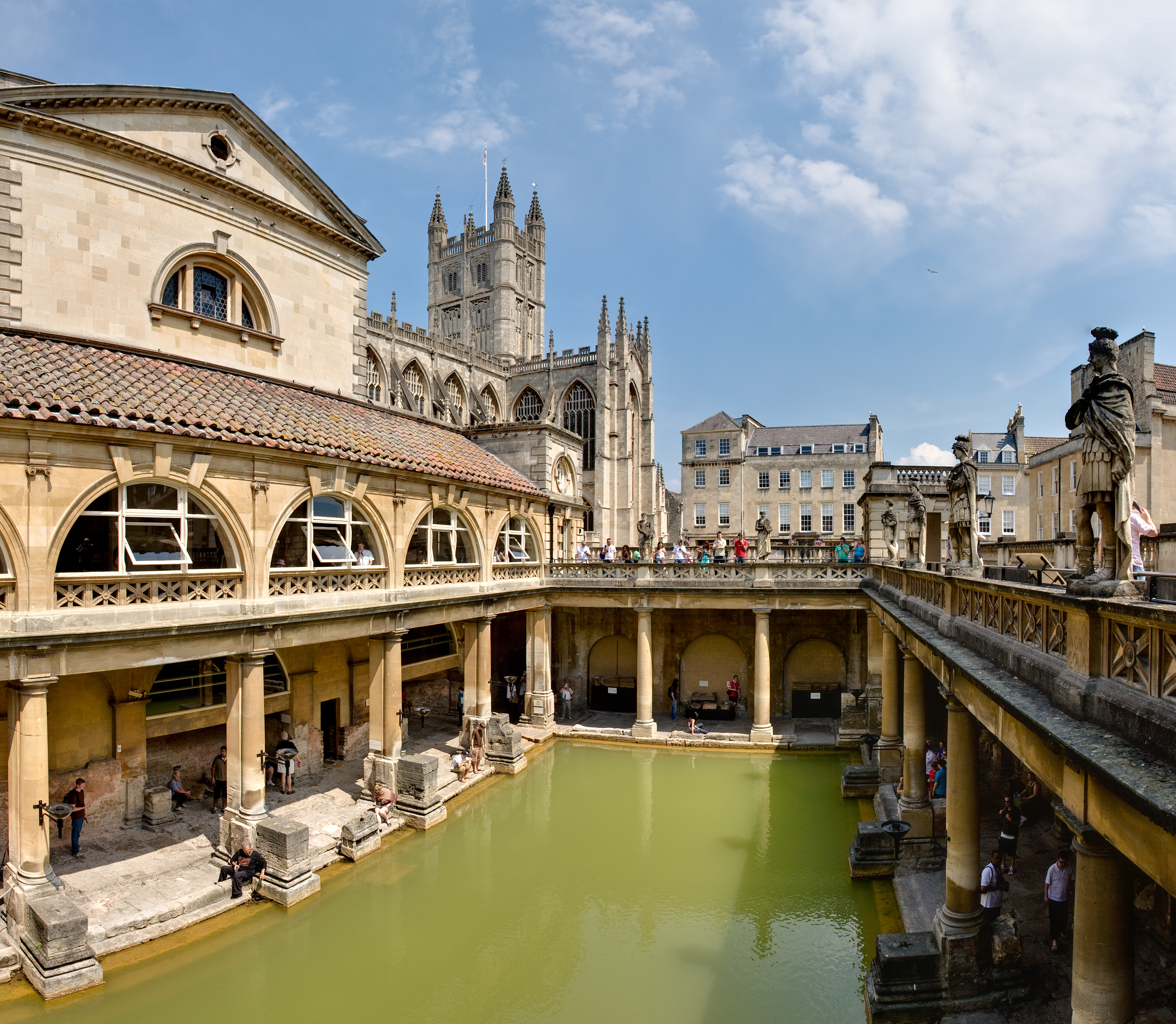
Roman public baths in Bath

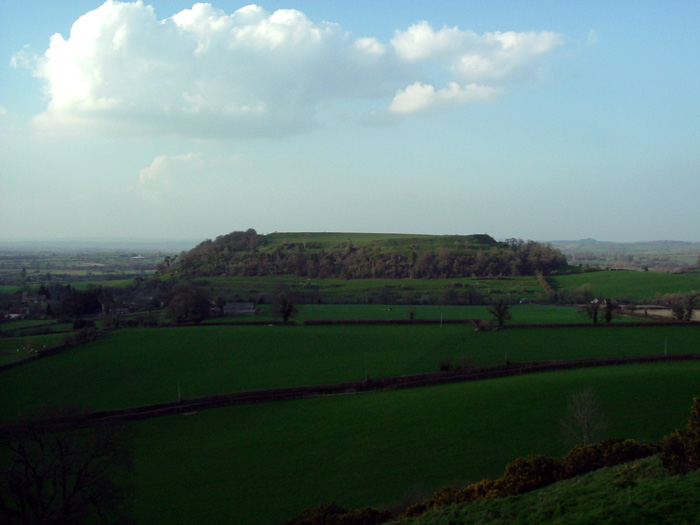
Cadbury Castle

Somerset was part of the Roman Empire from 47 AD to about 409 AD. However, the end was not abrupt and elements of Romanitas lingered on for perhaps a century.

Somerset was invaded from the south-east by the Second Legion Augusta, under the future emperor Vespasian. The hillforts of the Durotriges at Ham Hill and Cadbury Castle were captured. Ham Hill probably had a temporary Roman occupation. The massacre at Cadbury Castle seems to have been associated with the later Boudiccan Revolt of 60–61 AD. The county remained part of the Roman Empire until around 409 AD.

The Roman invasion, and possibly the preceding period of involvement in the internal affairs of the south of England, was inspired in part by the potential of the Mendip Hills. A great deal of the attraction of the lead mines may have been the potential for the extraction of silver.

Forts were set up at Bath and Ilchester. The lead and silver mines at Charterhouse in the Mendip Hills were run by the military. The Romans established a defensive boundary along the new military road known the Fosse Way (from the Latin fossa meaning ditch). The Fosse Way ran through Bath, Shepton Mallet, Ilchester and south-west towards Axminster. The road from Dorchester ran through Yeovil to meet the Fosse Way at Ilchester. Small towns and trading ports were set up, such as Camerton and Combwich. The larger towns decayed in the latter part of the period, though the smaller ones appear to have decayed less. In the latter part of the period, Ilchester seems to have been a "civitas" capital and Bath may also have been one. Particularly to the east of the River Parrett, villas were constructed. However, only a few Roman sites have been found to the west of the river. The villas have produced important mosaics and artifacts. Cemeteries have been found outside the Roman towns of Somerset and by Roman temples such as that at Lamyatt. Romano-British farming settlements, such as those at Catsgore and Sigwells, have been found in Somerset. There was salt production on the Somerset Levels near Highbridge and quarrying took place near Bath, where the Roman Baths gave their name to Bath.

Excavations carried out before the flooding of Chew Valley Lake also uncovered Roman remains, indicating agricultural and industrial activity from the second half of the 1st century until the 3rd century AD. The finds included a moderately large villa at Chew Park, where wooden writing tablets (the first in the UK) with ink writing were found. There is also evidence from the Pagans Hill Roman Temple at Chew Stoke. In October 2001 the West Bagborough Hoard of 4th century Roman silver was discovered in West Bagborough. The 681 coins included two denarii from the early 2nd century and 8 Miliarense and 671 Siliqua all dating to the period AD 337 – 367. The majority were struck in the reigns of emperors Constantius II and Julian and derive from a range of mints including Arles and Lyon in France, Trier in Germany and Rome.

In April 2010, the Frome Hoard, one of the largest-ever hoards of Roman coins discovered in Britain, was found by a metal detectorist. The hoard of 52,500 coins dated from the 3rd century AD and was found buried in a field near Frome, in a jar 14 inches (36 cm) below the surface. The coins were excavated by archaeologists from the Portable Antiquities Scheme.

== Sub-Roman period ==
This is the period from about 409 AD to the start of Saxon political control, which was mainly in the late 7th century, though they are said to have captured the Bath area in 577 AD. Initially the Britons of Somerset seem to have continued much as under the Romans but without the imperial taxation and markets. There was then a period of civil war in Britain though it is not known how this affected Somerset. The Western Wandsdyke may have been constructed in this period but archaeological data shows that it was probably built during the 5th or 6th century. This area became the border between the Romano-British Celts and the West Saxons following the Battle of Deorham in 577 AD. The ditch is on the north side, so presumably it was used by the Celts as a defence against Saxons encroaching from the upper Thames Valley. According to the Anglo-Saxon Chronicle, the Saxon Cenwalh achieved a breakthrough against the British Celtic tribes, with victories at Bradford-on-Avon (in the Avon Gap in the Wansdyke) in 652 AD, and further south at the Battle of Peonnum (at Penselwood) in 658 AD, followed by an advance west through the Polden Hills to the River Parrett.

The Saxon advance from the east seems to have been halted by battles between the British and Saxons, for example; at the siege of Badon Mons Badonicus (which may have been in the Bath region e.g. at Solsbury Hill), or Bathampton Down. During the 5th, 6th and 7th centuries, Somerset was probably partly in the Kingdom of Dumnonia, partly in the land of the Durotriges and partly in that of the Dobunni. The boundaries between these is largely unknown, but may have been similar to those in the Iron Age. Various "tyrants" seem to have controlled territories from reoccupied hill forts. There is evidence of an elite at hill forts such as Cadbury Castle and Cadbury Camp; for example, there is imported pottery. Cemeteries are an important source of evidence for the period and large ones have been found in Somerset, such as that at Cannington, which was used from the Roman to the Saxon period. The towns of Somerset seem to have been little used during that period but there continued to be farming on the villa sites and at the Romano-British villages.

There may have been effects from plague and volcanic eruption during this period as well as marine transgression into the Levels.

The language spoken during this period is thought to be Southwestern Brythonic, but only one or two inscribed stones survive in Somerset from this period. However, a couple of curse tablets found in the baths at Bath may be in this language. Some place names in Somerset seem to be Celtic in origin and may be from this period or earlier, e.g. Tarnock. Some river names, such as Parrett, may be Celtic or pre-Celtic. The religion of the people of Somerset in this period is thought to be Christian but it was isolated from Rome until after the Council of Hertford in 673 AD when Aldhelm was asked to write a letter to Geraint of Dumnonia and his bishops. Some church sites in Somerset are thought to date from this period, e.g., Llantokay Street.

Most of what is known of the history of this period comes from Gildas's On the Ruin of Britain, which is thought to have been written in Durotrigan territory, possibly at Glastonbury.

The earliest fortification of Taunton started for King Ine of Wessex and Æthelburg, in or about the year 710 AD. However, according to the Anglo-Saxon Chronicle this was destroyed 12 years later.

== Early Medieval ==
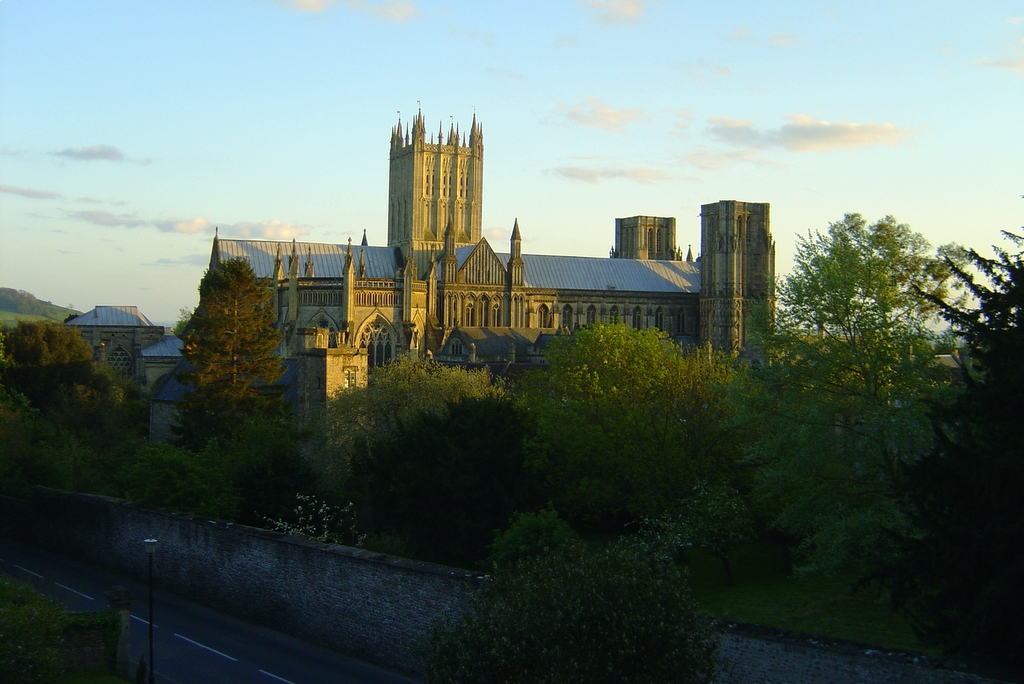
Wells Cathedral – the first church on this site was built in 705 AD

This is the period from the late 7th century (for most of Somerset) to 1066, though for part of the 10th and 11th centuries England was under Danish control. Somerset, like Dorset to the south, held the West Saxon advance from Wiltshire/Hampshire back for over a century, remaining a frontier between the Saxons and the Romano-British Celts.

The Saxons conquered Bath following the Battle of Deorham in 577, and the border was probably established along the line of the Wansdyke to the north of the Mendip Hills. Then Cenwalh of Wessex broke through at Bradford-on-Avon in 652, and the Battle of Peonnum possibly at Penselwood in 658, advancing west through the Polden Hills to the River Parrett. In 661 the Saxons may have advanced into what is now Devon as a result of a battle fought at Postesburh, possibly Posbury near Crediton.

Then in the period 681–85 Centwine of Wessex conquered King Cadwaladr and "advanced as far as the sea", but it is not clear where this was. It is assumed that the Saxons occupied the rest of Somerset about this time. The Saxon rule was consolidated under King Ine, who established a fort at Taunton, demolished by his wife in 722. It is sometimes said that he built palaces at Somerton and South Petherton but this does not seem to be the case. He fought against Geraint in 710. In 705 the diocese of Sherborne was formed, taking in Wessex west of Selwood. Saxon kings granted land in Somerset by charter from the 7th century onward. The way and extent to which the Britons survived under the Saxons is a debatable matter. However, King Ine's laws make provision for Britons. Somerset originally formed part of Wessex and latter became a separate "shire". Somersetshire seems to have been formed within Wessex during the 8th century though it is not recorded as a name until later. Mints were set up at times in various places in Somerset in the Saxon period, e.g., Watchet.

Somerset played an important part in defeating the spread of the Danes in the 9th century. The Anglo-Saxon Chronicle records that in 845 Alderman Eanwulf, with the men of Somersetshire (Sumorsǣte), and Bishop Ealstan, and Alderman Osric, with the men of Dorsetshire, conquered the Danish army at the mouth of the Parret. This was the first known use of the name Somersæte. The Anglo-Saxon Chronicle reports that in January 878 the King Alfred the Great fled into the marshes of Somerset from the Viking's invasion and made a fort at Athelney. From the fort Alfred was able to organize a resistance using the local militias from Somerset, Wiltshire and Hampshire.

Viking raids took place for instance in 987 and 997 at Watchet and the Battle of Cynwit. King Alfred was driven to seek refuge from the Danes at Athelney before defeating them at the Battle of Ethandun in 878, usually considered to be near Edington, Wiltshire, but possibly the village of Edington in Somerset. Alfred established a series of forts and lookout posts linked by a military road, or Herepath, so his army could cover Viking movements at sea. The Herepath has a characteristic form which is familiar on the Quantocks: a regulation 20 m wide track between avenues of trees growing from hedge laying embankments. The Herepath ran from the ford on the River Parrett at Combwich, past Cannington hill fort to Over Stowey, where it climbed the Quantocks along the line of the current Stowey road, to Crowcombe Park Gate. Then it went south along the ridge, to Triscombe Stone. One branch may have led past Lydeard Hill and Buncombe Hill, back to Alfred's base at Athelney. The main branch descended the hills at Triscombe, then along the avenue to Red Post Cross, and west to the Brendon Hills and Exmoor. A peace treaty with the Danes was signed at Wedmore and the Danish king Guthrum the Old was baptised at Aller. Burhs (fortified places) had been set up by 919, such as Lyng. The Alfred Jewel, an object about 2.5 inch long, made of filigree gold, cloisonné-enamelled and with a rock crystal covering, was found in 1693 at Petherton Park, North Petherton. Believed to have been owned by Alfred the Great it is thought to have been the handle for a pointer that would have fit into the hole at its base and been used while reading a book.

Monasteries and minster churches were set up all over Somerset, with daughter churches from the minsters in manors. There was a royal palace at Cheddar, which was used at times in the 10th century to host the Witenagemot, and there is likely to have been a "central place" at Somerton, Bath, Glastonbury and Frome since the kings visited them. The towns of Somerset seem to have been in occupation in this period though evidence for this is limited because of subsequent buildings on top of remains from this period. Agriculture flourished in this period, with a re-organisation into centralised villages in the latter part in the east of the county.

In the period before the Norman Conquest, Somerset came under the control of Godwin, Earl of Wessex, and his family. There seems to have been some Danish settlement at Thurloxton and Spaxton, judging from the place-names. After the Norman Conquest, the county was divided into 700 fiefs, and large areas were owned by the crown, with fortifications such as Dunster Castle used for control and defence.

This period of Somerset's history is well documented, for example in the Anglo-Saxon Chronicle and Asser's Life of Alfred.

== Later Medieval ==
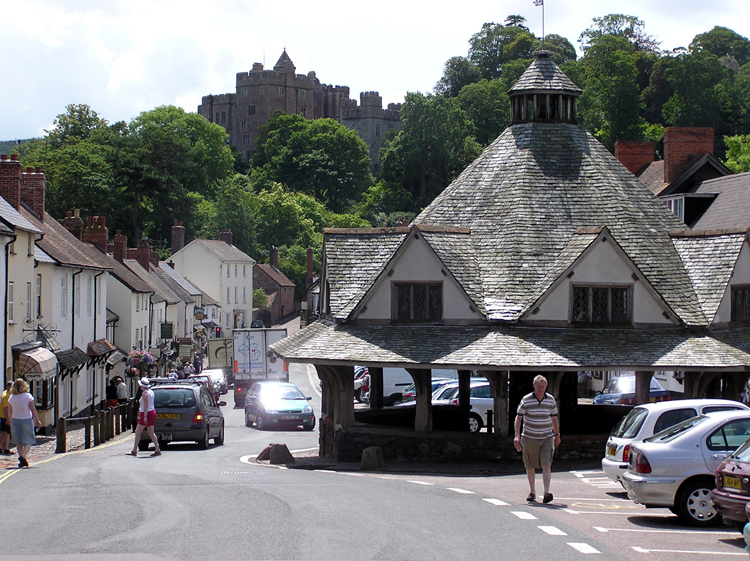
Dunster yarn market and castle

This is the period from 1066 to around 1500. Following the defeat of the Saxons by the Normans in 1066, various castles were set up in Somerset by the new lords such as that at Dunster, and the manors was awarded to followers of William the Conqueror such as William de Moyon and Walter of Douai. Somerset does not seem to have played much part in the civil war in King Stephen's time, but Somerset lords were main players in the murder of Thomas Becket.

A good picture of the county in 1086 is given by Domesday Book, though there is some difficulty in identifying the various places since the hundreds are not specified. The total population given for the county, which had different boundaries to those today, was 13,399, however this only included the heads of households, so with their families this may have been around 67,000. Farming seems to have prospered for the next three centuries but was severely hit by the Black Death which in 1348 arrived in Dorset and quickly spread through Somerset, causing widespread mortality, perhaps as much as 50% in places. It re-occurred, resulting in a change in feudal practices since the manpower was no longer so available.

Reclamation of land from marsh in the Somerset Levels increased, largely under monastic influence. Crafts and industries also flourished, the Somerset woollen industry being one of the largest in England at this time. "New towns" were founded in this period in Somerset, i.e. Newport, but were not successful. Coal mining on the Mendips was an important source of wealth while quarrying also took place, an example is near Bath.

The towns grew, again often by monastic instigation, during this period and fairs were started. The church was very powerful at this period, particularly Glastonbury Abbey. After their church burnt down, the monks there "discovered" the tomb of "King Arthur" and were able rebuild their church. There were over 20 monasteries in Somerset at this period including the priory at Hinton Charterhouse which was founded in 1232 by Ela, Countess of Salisbury who also founded Lacock Abbey. Many parish churches were re-built in this period. Between 1107 and 1129 William Giffard the Chancellor of King Henry I, converted the bishop's hall in Taunton into Taunton Castle. Bridgwater Castle was built in 1202 by William Brewer. It passed to the king in 1233 and in 1245 repairs were ordered to its motte and towers. During the 11th century Second Barons' War against Henry III, Bridgwater was held by the barons against the King. In the English Civil War the town and the castle were held by the Royalists under Colonel Sir Francis Wyndham. Eventually, with many buildings destroyed in the town, the castle and its valuable contents were surrendered to the Parliamentarians. The castle itself was deliberately destroyed in 1645.

During the Middle Ages sheep farming for the wool trade came to dominate the economy of Exmoor. The wool was spun into thread on isolated farms and collected by merchants to be woven, fulled, dyed and finished in thriving towns such as Dunster. The land started to be enclosed and from the 17th century onwards larger estates developed, leading to establishment of areas of large regular shaped fields. During this period a Royal Forest and hunting ground was established, administered by the Warden. The Royal Forest was sold off in 1818.

In the medieval period the River Parrett was used to transport Hamstone from the quarry at Ham Hill, Bridgwater was part of the Port of Bristol until the Port of Bridgwater was created in 1348, covering 80 miles (130 km) of the Somerset coast line, from the Devon border to the mouth of the River Axe. Historically, the main port on the river was at Bridgwater; the river being bridged at this point, with the first bridge being constructed in 1200 AD. Quays were built in 1424; with another quay, the Langport slip, being built in 1488 upstream of the Town Bridge. A Customs House was sited at Bridgwater, on West Quay; and a dry dock, launching slips and a boat yard on East Quay. The river was navigable, with care, to Bridgwater Town Bridge by 400 to 500 tonnes (440 to 550 tons) vessels. By trans-shipping into barges at the Town Bridge the Parrett was navigable as far as Langport and (via the River Yeo) to Ilchester.

== Early Modern ==
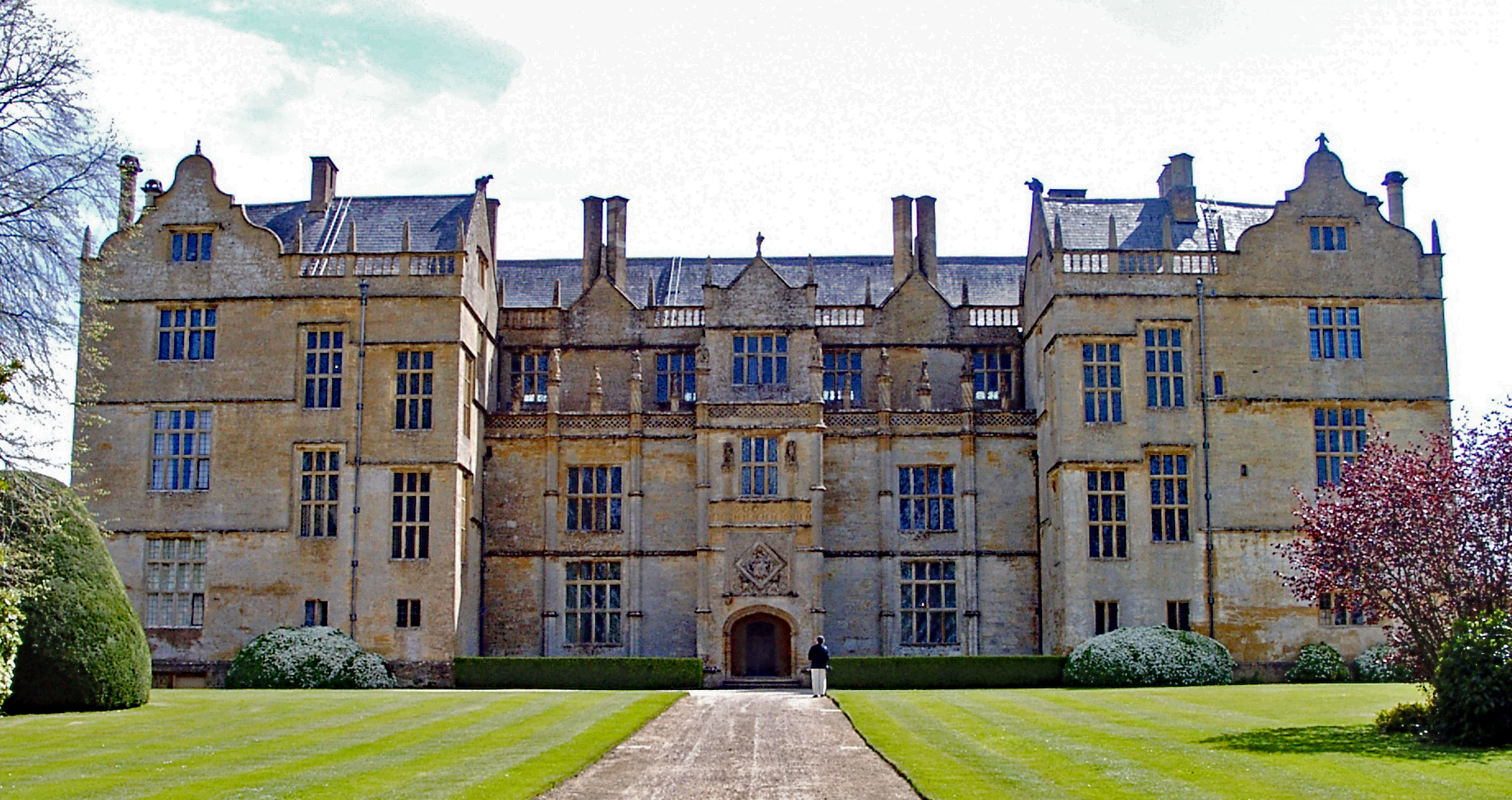
Montacute House

This is the period from around 1500 to 1800. In the 1530s, the monasteries were dissolved and their lands bought from the king by various important families in Somerset. By 1539, Glastonbury Abbey was the only monastery left, its abbot Richard Whiting was then arrested and executed on the orders of Thomas Cromwell. From the Tudor to the Georgian times, farming specialised and techniques improved, leading to increases in population, although no new towns seem to have been founded. Large country houses such as at Hinton St George and Montacute House were built at this time.

The Bristol Channel floods of 1607 are believed to have affected large parts of the Somerset Levels with flooding up to 8 feet (2 m) above sea level. In 1625, a House of Correction was established in Shepton Mallet and, today, HMP Shepton Mallet is England's oldest prison still in use.

During the English Civil War, Somerset was largely Parliamentarian, although Dunster was a Royalist stronghold. The county was the site of important battles between the Royalists and the Parliamentarians, notably the Battle of Lansdowne in 1643 and the Battle of Langport in 1645. The castle changed hands several times during 1642–45 along with the town. During the Siege of Taunton it was defended by Robert Blake, from July 1644 to July 1645. This war resulted in castles being destroyed to prevent their re-use.

In 1685, the Duke of Monmouth led the Monmouth Rebellion in which Somerset people fought against James II. The rebels landed at Lyme Regis and travelled north hoping to capture Bristol and Bath, puritan soldiers damaged the west front of Wells Cathedral, tore lead from the roof to make bullets, broke the windows, smashed the organ and the furnishings, and for a time stabled their horses in the nave. They were defeated in the Battle of Sedgemoor at Westonzoyland, the last battle fought on English soil. The Bloody Assizes which followed saw the losers being sentenced to death or transportation.

The Society of Friends established itself in Street in the mid-17th century, and among the close-knit group of Quaker families were the Clarks: Cyrus started a business in sheepskin rugs, later joined by his brother James, who introduced the production of woollen slippers and, later, boots and shoes. C&J Clark still has its headquarters in Street, but shoes are no longer manufactured there. Instead, in 1993, redundant factory buildings were converted to form Clarks Village, the first purpose-built factory outlet in the United Kingdom.

The 18th century was largely one of peace and declining industrial prosperity in Somerset. The Industrial Revolution in the Midlands and Northern England spelt the end for most of Somerset's cottage industries. However, farming continued to flourish, with the Bath and West of England Agricultural Society being founded in 1777 to improve methods. John Billingsley conducted a survey of the county's agriculture in 1795 but found that methods could still be improved.

Arthur Wellesley took his title, Duke of Wellington from the town of Wellington. He is commemorated on a nearby hill with a large, spotlit obelisk, known as the Wellington Monument.

In north Somerset, mining in the Somerset coalfield was an important industry, and in an effort to reduce the cost of transporting the coal the Somerset Coal Canal was built; part of it was later converted into a railway. Other canals included the Bridgwater and Taunton Canal, Westport Canal, Grand Western Canal, Glastonbury Canal and Chard Canal. The Dorset and Somerset Canal was proposed, but very little of it was ever constructed.

== Late Modern ==
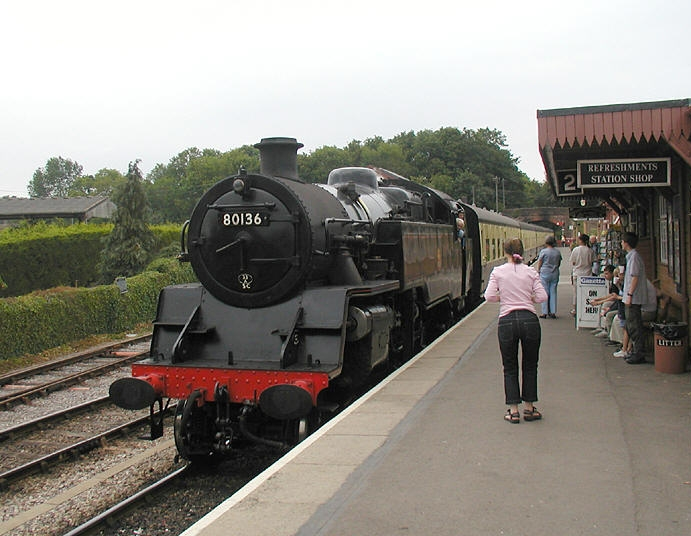
West Somerset Railway

The 19th century saw improvements to Somerset's roads with the introduction of turnpikes and the building of canals and railways. The usefulness of the canals was short-lived, though they have now been restored for recreation. The railways were nationalised after the Second World War, but continued until 1965, when smaller lines were scrapped; two were transferred back to private ownership as "heritage" lines.

In 1889, Somerset County Council was created, replacing the administrative functions of the Quarter Sessions.

The population of Somerset has continued to grow since 1800, when it was 274,000, particularly in the seaside towns such as Weston-super-Mare. Some population decline occurred earlier in the period in the villages, but this has now been reversed, and by 1951 the population of Somerset was 551,000.

Chard claims to be the birthplace of powered flight, as it was here in 1848 that the Victorian aeronautical pioneer John Stringfellow first demonstrated that engine-powered flight was possible through his work on the Aerial Steam Carriage. North Petherton was the first town in England (and one of the few ever) to be lit by acetylene gas lighting, supplied by the North Petherton Rosco Acetylene Company. Street lights were provided in 1906. Acetylene was replaced in 1931 by coal gas produced in Bridgwater, as well as by the provision of an electricity supply.

Around the 1860s, at the height of the iron and steel era, a pier and a deep-water dock were built, at Portishead, by the Bristol & Portishead Pier and Railway to accommodate the large ships that had difficulty in reaching Bristol Harbour. The Portishead power stations were coal-fed power stations built next to the dock. Construction work started on Portishead "A" power station in 1926. It began generating electricity in 1929 for the Bristol Corporation's Electricity Department. In 1951, Albright and Wilson built a chemical works on the opposite side of the dock from the power stations. The chemical works produced white phosphorus from phosphate rock imported, through the docks, into the UK. The onset of new generating capacity at Pembroke (oil-fired) and Didcot (coal-fired) in the mid-1970s brought about the closure of the older, less efficient "A" Station. The newer of the two power stations ("B" Station) was converted to burn oil when the Somerset coalfields closed. Industrial activities ceased in the dock with the closure of the power stations. The Port of Bristol Authority finally closed the dock in 1992, and it has now been developed into a marina and residential area.

During the First World War hundreds of Somerset soldiers were killed, and war memorials were put up in most of the towns and villages; only a few villages escaped casualties. There were also casualties – though much fewer – during the Second World War, who were added to the memorials. The county was a base for troops preparing for the 1944 D-Day landings, and some Somerset hospitals still date partly from that time. The Royal Ordnance Factory ROF Bridgwater was constructed early in World War II for the Ministry of Supply. It was designed as an Explosive ROF, to produce RDX, which was then a new experimental high-explosive. It obtained water supplies from two sources via the Somerset Levels: the artificial Huntspill River which was dug during the construction of the factory and also from the King's Sedgemoor Drain, which was widened at the same time. The Taunton Stop Line was set up to resist a potential German invasion, and the remains of its pill boxes can still be seen, as well as others along the coast. A decoy town was constructed on Black Down, intended to represent the blazing lights of a town which had neglected to follow the black-out regulations. Sites in the county housed Prisoner of War camps including: Norton Fitzwarren, Barwick, Brockley, Goathurst and Wells. Various airfields were built or converted from civilian use including: RNAS Charlton Horethorne (HMS Heron II), RAF Weston-super-Mare, RNAS Yeovilton (HMS Heron), Yeovil/Westland Airport, RAF Weston Zoyland, RAF Merryfield, RAF Culmhead and RAF Charmy Down.

Exmoor was one of the first British National Parks, designated in 1954, under the 1949 National Parks and Access to the Countryside Act. and is named after its main river. It was expanded in 1991 and in 1993 Exmoor was designated as an Environmentally Sensitive Area. The Quantock Hills were designated as an Area of Outstanding Natural Beauty (AONB) in 1956, the first such designation in England under the National Parks and Access to the Countryside Act 1949. The Mendip Hills followed with AONB designation in 1972.

Hinkley Point A nuclear power station was a Magnox power station constructed between 1957 and 1962 and operating until ceasing generation in 2000. Hinkley Point B is an Advanced Gas-cooled Reactor (AGR) which was designed to generate 1250 MW of electricity (MWe). Construction of Hinkley Point B started in 1967. In September 2008 it was announced, by Électricité de France (EDF), that a third, twin-unit European Pressurised Reactor (EPR) power station known as Hinkley Point C is planned, to replace Hinkley Point B which was due for closure in 2016, but has now has its life extended until 2022.

Somerset today has only two small cities, Bath and Wells, and only small towns in comparison with other areas of England. Tourism is a major source of employment along the coast, and in Bath and Cheddar for example. Other attractions include Exmoor, West Somerset Railway, Haynes Motor Museum and the Fleet Air Arm Museum as well as the churches and the various National Trust and English Heritage properties in Somerset.

Agriculture continues to be a major business, if no longer a major employer because of mechanisation. Light industries take place in towns such as Bridgwater and Yeovil. The towns of Taunton and Shepton Mallet manufacture cider, although the number of apple orchards has reduced.

In the late 19th century the boundaries of Somerset were slightly altered, but the main change came in 1974 when the county of Avon was set up. The northern part of Somerset was removed from the administrative control of Somerset County Council. On abolition of the county of Avon in 1996, these areas became separate administrative authorities, "North Somerset" and "Bath and North East Somerset". The Department for Communities and Local Government was considering a proposal by Somerset County Council to change Somerset's administrative structure by abolishing the five districts to create a Somerset unitary authority. The changes were planned to be implemented no later than 1 April 2009. However, support for the county council's bid was not guaranteed and opposition among the district council and local population was strong; 82% of people responding to a referendum organised by the five district councils rejected the proposals. It was confirmed in July 2007 that the government had rejected the proposals for unitary authorities in Somerset, and that the present two-tier arrangements of Somerset County Council and the district councils will remain.

== See also ==
- Somerset
  - List of tourist attractions in Somerset
  - Timeline of Somerset history
- Somerset Victoria County History
- Category:Hill forts in Somerset
- Category:History of Somerset
- Geology of Somerset
- History of England
- Timeline of the Anglo-Saxon invasion and takeover of Britain.
- List of places in Somerset
- List of Sites of Special Scientific Interest in Somerset
- William Fitz Reynold
