= Battle of Peonnum =

7th century battle between Saxons and Britons

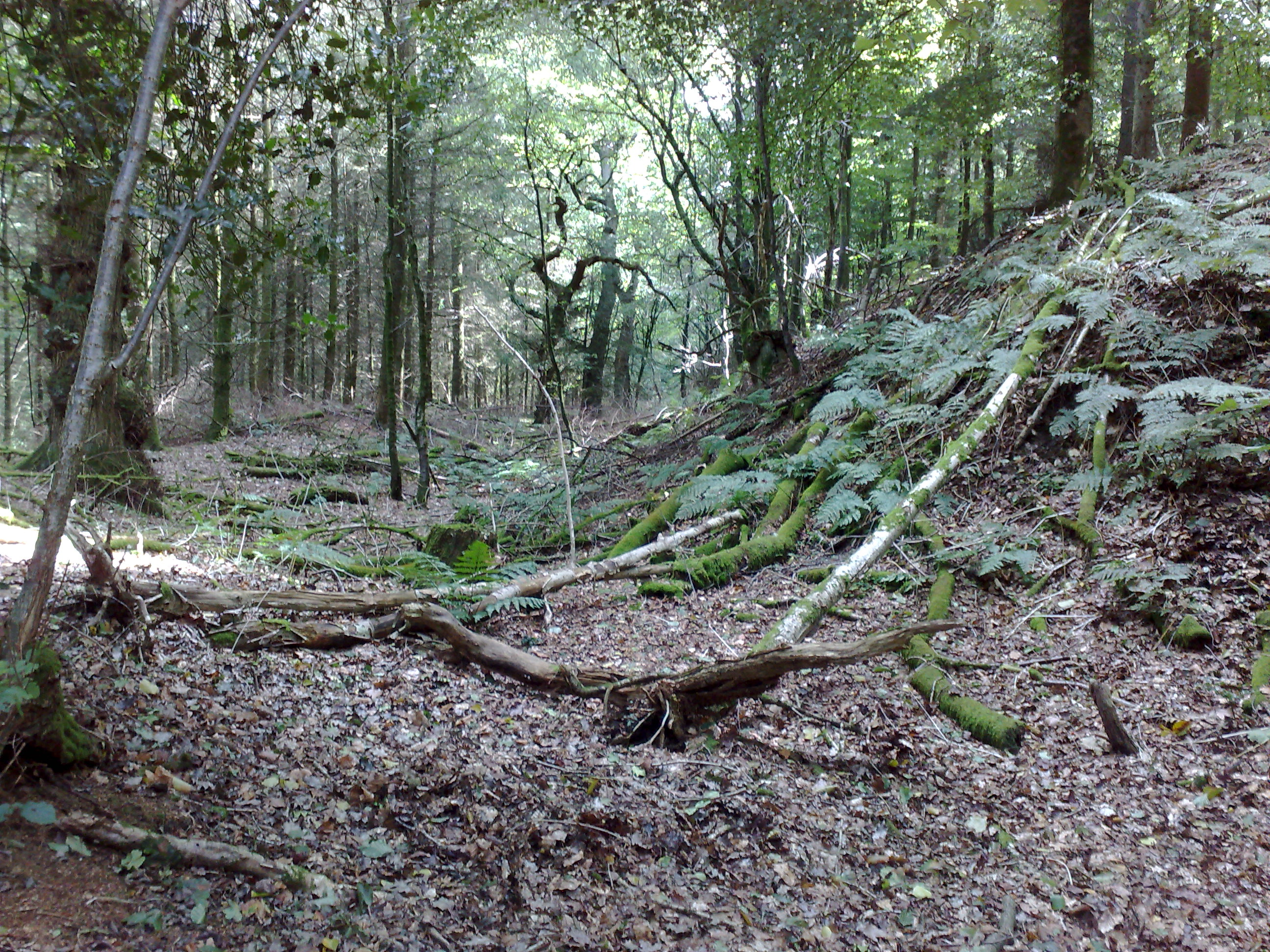
- Remains of the reconditioned Roman Fort north of Penselwood known as Kenwalch's Castle showing residual banks and ditches
Date	c. 660
Location	Somerset
Result	Saxon victory

Belligerents
West Saxons	Britons

Commanders and leaders
Cenwalh	

The Battle of Peonnum was fought about AD 660 between the West Saxons under Cenwalh and the Britons of what is now Somerset in England. It was a decisive victory for the Saxons, who gained control of Somerset as far west as the River Parrett. The location of the battle is uncertain.

== Saxon conquest ==
The border between the West Saxons and the Britons of Somerset had been set at the Wansdyke along the ridge of the Mendip Hills following the Battle of Deorham and the Saxon occupation of Bath in 577. Then, in 652, Cenwalh broke through at the Battle of Bradford on Avon.

Relief for the Britons came when Cenwalh was exiled to East Anglia after a squabble with Penda of Mercia. Some time after his return he renewed the attack on the British tribes and in 658 his army met the Britons for a climactic battle at Peonnum. The Saxons were victorious, and Cenwalh advanced west through the Polden Hills to the River Parrett, annexing eastern and central Somerset. The territory gained was modest in size; Geoffrey Ashe suggests that Cenwalh's ultimate goal may have been gaining control over the valuable Glastonbury Abbey within it.

The border remained at the Parrett until 681–685, when Centwine of Wessex defeated King Cadwaladr of Gwynedd and his local allies, allowing them to occupy the rest of Somerset west and north to the Bristol Channel. West Saxon rule was consolidated and extended into Devon by King Ina.

== Location ==
The battle is said to have happened æt peonnum, which means "at the penns". Penn is the Brittonic Celtic word for "head" or "top", widely used for "hill" or "peak". An element 'Pen' in modern place-names in this area is found in Penselwood (Pen Selwood), near Wincanton which is called Penna in the Domesday Book, Pinhoe or Pen Beacon in Devon, and Penn (near Yeovil). One of the highest points of the Mendip Hills is named Pen Hill.

== See also ==
- History of Somerset
- Timeline of conflict in Anglo-Saxon Britain
