= Mary Harfield =

Self-taught archaeologist

Mary Harfield (28 February 1889 - 1970) was a self-taught, Australian-British archaeologist, whose understanding of Cadbury Castle through field survey influenced the work and interpretations of the site by others, including Ralegh Radford.

== Biography ==
Harfield was born on Shark Island in Australia. Her father died before she was born and her mother returned with her children to England, where Harfield and her two brothers were fostered by the extended family. This later involved her living with family in Canada. In 1910 she returned to England to study nursing at St Bartholomew's Hospital in London. During the First World War she continued to nurse at the 1st London General Military Hospital.

In later life she moved to Somerset and became interested in the archaeological remains local to her, particularly Cadbury Castle. During the 1950s Harfield's field-walking identified a range of ceramics, including Neolithic pottery and an early medieval sherd. Her work was used by Ralegh Radford to argue that there was significant Neolithic occupation at the site. Her finds archive was subsequently acquired by Taunton Museum.

== Personal life ==
She had a dog called Caesar, who accompanied her on field surveys.
