= Sigwells =

Hamlet in Somerset, England

Coordinates: 51.012°N 2.507°W

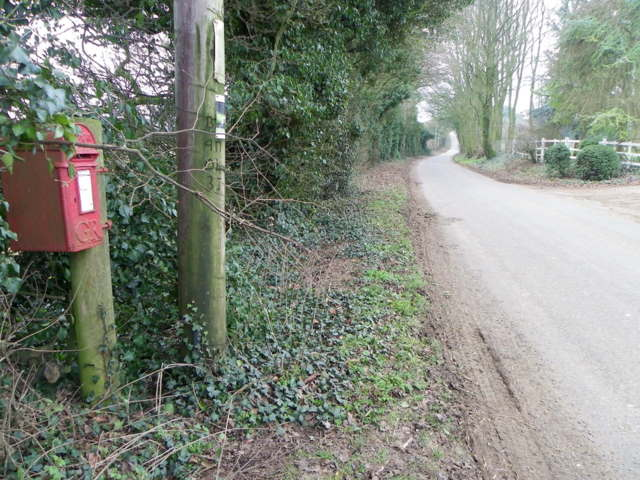
A minor road, Sigwells

Sigwells is a hamlet located in an area rich in archaeology remains, overlooking Cadbury Castle in Somerset, England.

It was the target of research by the South Cadbury Environs Project, which produced significant Early Bronze Age and Middle and Late Iron Age archaeology. Of national importance was the identification of the earliest known metalworking building in Britain, dated to Middle Bronze Age (12th century BC). It has been designated as a Scheduled Ancient Monument (No:199838).

== Archaeological research at Sigwells ==
Sigwells, a rural plateau overlooking the Somerset hill fort, Cadbury Castle, was the site of early excavations by one of the fathers of modern archaeology, General Augustus Pitt Rivers (then Lane Fox), in 1877. A geophysical survey that was part of a pilot study by the South Cadbury Environs Project revealed that the three Early Bronze Age barrows he explored were at the centre of a complex, multi-period landscape, which has since been the subject of test pitting and excavation. The most important discovery was the earliest known bronze casting building and associated enclosure in Britain. It has also made an important contribution to Late Iron Age ceramic studies through providing clear evidence that Dorset Black-burnished ware was distributed well beyond its area of production before the 1st century AD.

The outstanding geophysical survey results provide the main data set for an important archaeological application of computerised network analysis.

== Early Bronze Age barrow and linear system ==
Pitt Rivers excavated two over lapping Early Bronze Age round barrows and a single round barrow. The latter was explored again in 1995 and 2005, the second of these excavations revealing that its ring ditch cut through an earlier ditch, one of at least four parallel long linear boundaries identified by the geophysical survey. This places the origins of the linear boundary system as Early Bronze Age or, possibly, Neolithic, hence one of the earliest such systems in mainland Britain.

== Middle Bronze Age metalworking enclosure ==
The enclosure was discovered by the geophysical survey, formed by a rectangular ditch adjoining the south side of one of the earlier linear boundaries. Excavation in 1994 uncovered fragments of clay moulds for the casting of a late Bronze Age socketed spear, a sword and a socketed axe.

Excavations carried out between 2000 and 2005 showed that it had been used and backfilled several times between the 15th and 12th centuries BC. Part of the floor of a circular building in the north of the enclosure was heavily burnt and shallow scoops on the periphery of the building, as well as postholes within it, contained mould fragments from objects of what had been regarded as the later Bronze Age Wilburton metalworking tradition.

Most notable of the fragments were those subsequently refitted to a sword in the Museum of Somerset, which had been found in the 19th century 25 miles north of Sigwells. Cereal grains found in the scoop have been dated to the 12th century BC—the Middle Bronze Age—the earliest date for that tradition, Though Bronze objects have been found that are around a millennium older, the building is the earliest metalworking site in Britain.

Other finds from the site are in the Eton College museum.

== Middle to Late Iron Age enclosures ==
By the Middle Iron Age an extensive patchwork of small, ditch-bounded paddocks and larger fields on the east of the Sigwells plateau were served by a substantial double-ditched track and branches from it. They were separated by two possible roundhouses in an open area from a sequence of enclosure, re-cuts and extensions and several hundred pits to the north west. It is one of three large pit groups on high ground overlooking Cadbury Castle. Within the enclosure whole and partial animal and human burials and Iron Age metalwork deposits were found immediately to the east of a rectangular structure that was interpreted as a shrine comparable with successive structures on the hill fort. recent carbon dating (unpublished) suggests that the activity dates from the 2nd century BC to the first years of the 1st century AD. The dating is of special importance to later Iron Age ceramic studies because it shows that Dorset Black-burnished ware (BB1) was circulating well beyond its area of production by around 100BC. Some researchers had assumed that it did not reach Somerset until after the Roman conquest of Britain, leading to problems in dating a violent episode on Cadbury Castle. The pits and enclosures had been abandoned before the conquest, although an enclosure 200 m to the south may have replaced them during the Late Iron Age. This enclosure may also have been abandoned before or during the conquest but it was in use again by the 2nd century AD.

== Romano-British settlement ==
During the later second or third century AD isolated stone-walled rectangular building were integrated within the refurbished Iron Age field system. The settlement pattern contrasts with a linear “street” arrangement of similarly dated farms at Catsgore, Somerset.

== See also ==
- History of Somerset
- RNAS Charlton Horethorne (HMS Heron II), a former Royal Naval Air Station in Sigwells
