= Geoffrey Ashe =

British cultural historian and lecturer (1923–2022)

Geoffrey Ashe MBE FRSL
- Born: 29 March 1923; London, England
- Died: 30 January 2022 (aged 98); Glastonbury, England
- Education: Cambridge University; University of British Columbia
- Occupations: Historian; author
- Notable work: King Arthur's Avalon: The Story of Glastonbury

Geoffrey Thomas Leslie Ashe MBE FRSL (29 March 1923 – 30 January 2022) was a British cultural historian and lecturer, known for his focus on King Arthur.

== Early life ==
Born in London, Ashe was an only child who excelled all his classmates in academics. Periods of poor health meant that he had ample opportunity to read broadly, or be read to. Through his parents, he developed a life-long enjoyment of Gilbert and Sullivan's operas and Conan Doyles' Sherlock Holmes canon. His mother read some of Conan Doyle's stories to him from the Strand when they were first published; his father took him to see Gilbert & Sullivan performances by some of the cast who had worked with Gilbert himself.

Ashe's father was general manager of Poly Tours, later Lunn-Poly, and travelled to Europe and the British Isles frequently with his parents to the hotels used by the agency, sometimes to correct problems, sometimes to establish business contacts. His favourite childhood memories were of summers spent in the West Highlands of Scotland, at the Highland Hotel in Fort William.

When he was 16, his parents emigrated to Vancouver, British Columbia. He studied English and graduated from the University of British Columbia before continuing at Trinity College, Cambridge.

== Work ==
Many of his historical books are centred on factual analysis of the Arthurian legend, and the archaeological past of King Arthur, beginning with his King Arthur's Avalon: The Story of Glastonbury, in 1957. The book was inspired by what Ashe had read in G. K. Chesterton's Short History of England.

He is a major proponent of the theory that the historical King Arthur was Riothamus, presented in an article in Speculum, April 1981, and expanded in The Discovery of King Arthur (1985) and in various further articles. His fresh idea was to scrutinise Arthur's foreign campaigns in Geoffrey of Monmouth's account and take the material seriously, concluding that, though the legendary Arthur is a composite figure, the career of Riothamus seems to underlie at least a major portion of Geoffrey's account, for which Ashe adduces passages in a Breton text and several chronicles.

Ashe, co-founder (with C. A. Ralegh Radford) and Secretary of the Camelot Research Committee has also helped demonstrate, through a dig directed by Leslie Alcock in 1966–70, that Cadbury Castle, identified as Camelot by the 16th-century antiquary John Leland, was actually refortified in the latter part of the fifth century, in works as yet unparalleled elsewhere in Britain at the time. Ashe's point is that when Leland picked out this hill as Camelot, he picked what seems to be the most plausible candidate; yet even an archaeologist could not have guessed that the fifth-century fortification was embedded in the earthworks, just by looking without digging.

"I would say there must have been a tradition about the hill and its powerful overlord, handed down from the Dark Ages", Ashe has said, and added "In the film of the musical Camelot, you have a brief glimpse of a map of Britain, and Camelot is in Somerset. It's there because I told Warner Brothers to put it there. That is my one contribution to Hollywood."

== Honours ==
Anya Seton put his name forward in 1963 as a Fellow of the Royal Society of Literature after publication of Land to the West: St Brendan's Voyage to America. Declining a nomination for honours for most of his career, nevertheless he was delighted to accept an MBE (Member of the Order of the British Empire) from the Queen in the 2012 New Year Honours for Services to Heritage. In 2015, Ashe was unanimously named an Honorary Freeman of Glastonbury by the Glastonbury Town Council "in recognition of his eminent services to the place as an author and cultural historian." He commented that his honour was most important to him because it symbolised the respect of his own community. Of deep professional and personal gratification to him was the title Eminent Arthurian, bestowed by The International Arthurian Society in the year of his 90th birthday, 2013.

== Personal life ==
He died in Glastonbury on 30 January 2022, at the age of 98.

== Publications ==
- King Arthur's Avalon: The Story of Glastonbury (1957)
- From Caesar to Arthur (1960)
- Land to the West: St Brendan's Voyage to America (1962)
- The Land and the Book: Israel – The Perennial Nation (1965)
- The Quest For Arthur's Britain (1968)
- Gandhi: A Study in Revolution (1968)
- All About King Arthur (1969)
- Camelot and the Vision of Albion (1971)
- King Arthur in Fact and Legend (1971)
- The Art of Writing Made Simple (1972)
- The Finger and the Moon (1973)
- Do What You Will: A History of Anti-Morality (1974)
  - revised as: The Hell-Fire Clubs: A History of Anti-Morality (2000)
- The Virgin (1976)
- The Ancient Wisdom (1977)
- Miracles (1978)
- Gandhi: A Biography (1980)
- A Guidebook to Arthurian Britain (1980)
- The Glastonbury Tor Maze (1982)
- Kings and Queens of Early Britain (1982)
- Avalonian Quest (1982)
- The Discovery of King Arthur (1985)
- The Landscape of King Arthur (1987)
- The Arthurian Handbook (1988) (with Norris J. Lacy)
- King Arthur: The Dream of a Golden Age (1990)
- Mythology of the British Isles (1990)
- Dawn Behind the Dawn: A Search for the Earthly Paradise (1991)
- Atlantis: Lost Lands, Ancient Wisdom (1992)
- Discovering the Goddess: A Personal Testimony (1994)
- The Book of Prophecy: From Ancient Greece to the Millennium (1999)
- Encyclopedia of Prophecy (2001)
- Merlin (2001)
- Labyrinths and Mazes (2003)
- The Offbeat Radicals: The British Tradition of Alternative Dissent (2007)
- Eden in the Altai: The Prehistoric Golden Age and the Mythic Origins of Humanity (2018)
