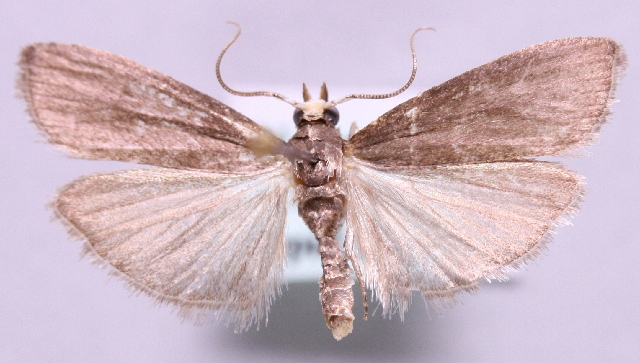

Scientific classification
- Kingdom: Animalia
- Phylum: Arthropoda
- Clade: Pancrustacea
- Class: Insecta
- Order: Lepidoptera
- Family: Pyralidae
- Tribe: Phycitini
- Genus: Salebriopsis; Hannemann, 1965
- Species: S. albicilla

Binomial name
- Salebriopsis albicilla (Herrich-Schäffer, 1849)

Synonyms
- Genus: Postsalebria Hannemann, 1964; Turdoempista Roesler, 1967; Species: Nephopterix albicilla Herrich-Schäffer, 1849

= Salebriopsis =

Species of moth

Salebriopsis is a monotypic snout moth genus erected by Hans-Joachim Hannemann in 1965. Its single species, Salebriopsis albicilla, was first described by Gottlieb August Wilhelm Herrich-Schäffer in 1849. It is found in most of Europe, except Ireland, Portugal, most of the Balkan Peninsula and Ukraine.

The wingspan is 19–21 mm. Adults are on wing from May to July in one generation per year.

The larvae feed on Salix species, Tilia cordata, Corylus and Alnus glutinosa. They feed between rolled leaves of their host plant.
