= Tickenham =

Village in Somerset, England

Coordinates: 51.43976°N 2.79989°W

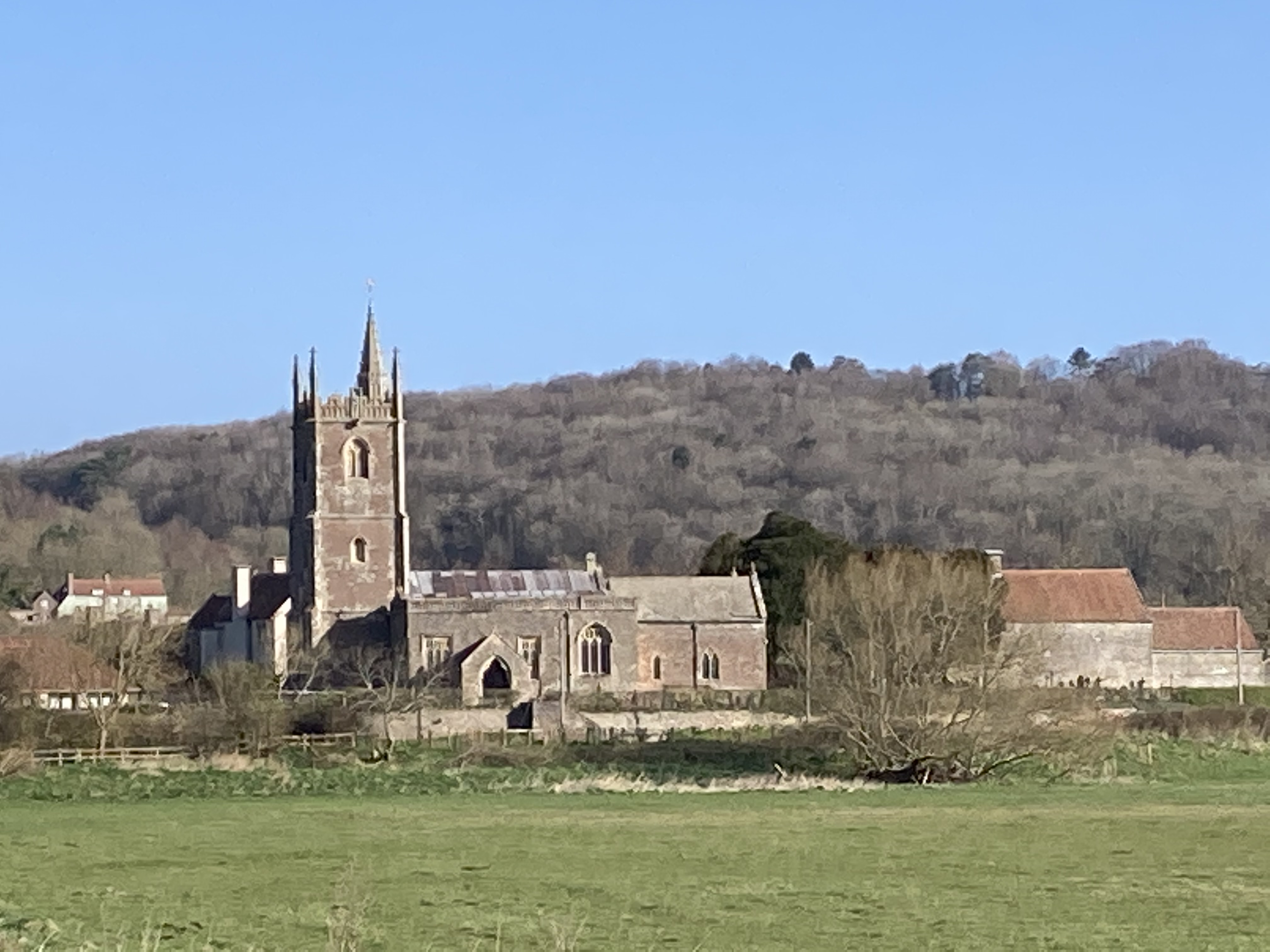
- The Church of SS Quiricus & Julietta, Tickenham, with Cadbury Camp behind it

- Location within Somerset
- Population: 910 (2011)
- OS grid reference: ST445715
- Unitary authority: North Somerset
- Ceremonial county: Somerset
- Region: South West
- Country: England
- Sovereign state: United Kingdom
- Post town: Clevedon
- Postcode district: BS21
- Dialling code: 01275
- Police: Avon and Somerset
- Fire: Avon
- Ambulance: South Western
- UK Parliament: North Somerset

Tickenham is a village and civil parish near Clevedon and Nailsea in North Somerset, England. The parish has a population of 910. It has a primary school, a village hall and a garden centre, but no shops, although it formerly had a post office.

A typical ribbon development, Tickenham extends for approximately two miles along the B3130 road, which runs along the bottom of a ridge of hills between Clevedon and Failand. There are a few short side-roads, but for most of this distance the village consists of detached houses and farmhouses built along the edge of the main road.

== History ==
On a hill to the north of the village is Cadbury Camp, an Iron Age hill fort. It is not uncommon to find ancient pottery shards in the surrounding grassland.

The parish of Tickenham was part of the Portbury Hundred.

The mill on the Land Yeo was established in the middle of the 12th century by Canons of the Abbey of St Augustine, (now Bristol Cathedral) who were granted the patronage of the living of Tickenham by Robert Fitzhardinge. In the 19th century the mill was owned by the Ashton Court Estate and in the 20th century was used as a water pump. It has now been converted into a private house.

== Governance ==
The parish council has responsibility for local issues, including setting an annual precept (local rate) to cover the council's operating costs and producing annual accounts for public scrutiny. The parish council evaluates local planning applications and works with the local police, district council officers, and neighbourhood watch groups on matters of crime, security, and traffic. The parish council's role also includes initiating projects for the maintenance and repair of parish facilities, such as the village hall or community centre, playing fields and playgrounds, as well as consulting with the district council on the maintenance, repair, and improvement of highways, drainage, footpaths, public transport, and street cleaning. Conservation matters (including trees and listed buildings) and environmental issues are also of interest to the council.

The parish falls within the unitary authority of North Somerset which was created in 1996, as established by the Local Government Act 1992. It provides a single tier of local government with responsibility for almost all local government functions within their area including local planning and building control, local roads, council housing, environmental health, markets and fairs, refuse collection, recycling, cemeteries, crematoria, leisure services, parks, and tourism. They are also responsible for education, social services, libraries, main roads, public transport, trading standards, waste disposal and strategic planning, although fire, police and ambulance services are provided jointly with other authorities through the Avon Fire and Rescue Service, Avon and Somerset Constabulary and the Great Western Ambulance Service.

North Somerset's area covers part of the ceremonial county of Somerset but it is administered independently of the non-metropolitan county. Its administrative headquarters are in the town hall in Weston-super-Mare. Between 1 April 1974 and 1 April 1996, it was the Woodspring district of the county of Avon. Before 1974 that the parish was part of the Long Ashton Rural District.

The parish is represented in the House of Commons of the Parliament of the United Kingdom as part of the North Somerset constituency, formerly part of the Woodspring constituency. It elects one Member of Parliament (MP) by the first past the post system of election.

== Geography ==
On the top of the hill accessed from either end of the village is a series of large houses and mansions.

There are several fruit farms and orchards in the village, some operating commercially and some in the gardens of private houses (owners will often sell their fruit when it is in season). The south-facing slopes on the north side of the B3130 make this a good area for horticulture, and is the site of the Limebreach Wood nature reserve. To the south of the B3130 is a large area of flat pasture less than five metres above sea level, known as Tickenham Moor, which is part of the Tickenham, Nailsea and Kenn Moors Site of Special Scientific Interest. This is mainly used for dairy farming.

Parts of the limestone ridge are protected grassland habitats supporting rare plant and wildlife species. Disused quarries and ruined lime kilns remain from former small-scale limestone extraction in the area.

A small river, the Land Yeo, flows through the parish.

== Landmarks ==
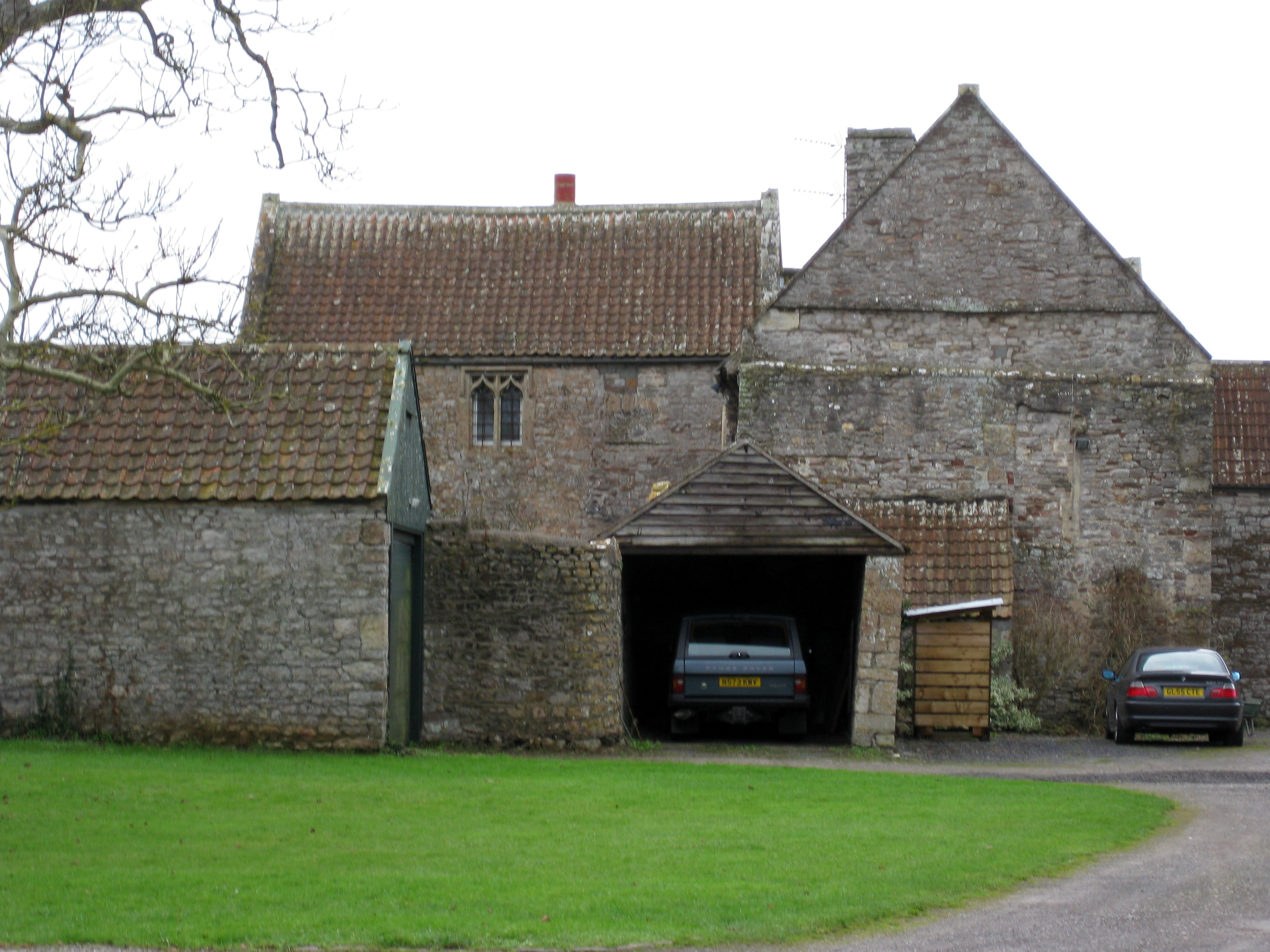
Tickenham Court

Tickenham Court (now a farm) contains a complete hall of around 1400 and parlour/solar wing of 1500 added to the west wing.

Tickenham Court was the home of Lady Eleanor Glanville, the 17th-century English entomologist. The Glanville fritillary butterfly is named after her.

The farm was used by the Home Guard for five years during the war and left in an almost derelict condition. During the second part of the 20th century the estate was farmed by agronomist Dr William Plant whose wife Ruth was an architect who restored the property.

== Twin towns ==
- (France) Aigné in Pays de la Loire which is about 3 miles (4.8 km) north west of Le Mans

== Transport ==
The M5 Motorway runs on the northern side of Tickenham Hill. The noise of the motorway is mostly muffled by the hill and woodland. Where the M5 cuts through the hill in a man made valley, there is a footbridge connecting either side of the hill.

== Education ==
The small village primary school usually has around 100 pupils from the locality. Secondary education is not available in the village and so many of the children living in the village commute daily to the nearby towns of Clevedon and Nailsea to attend secondary schools and sixth forms.

== Religious sites ==
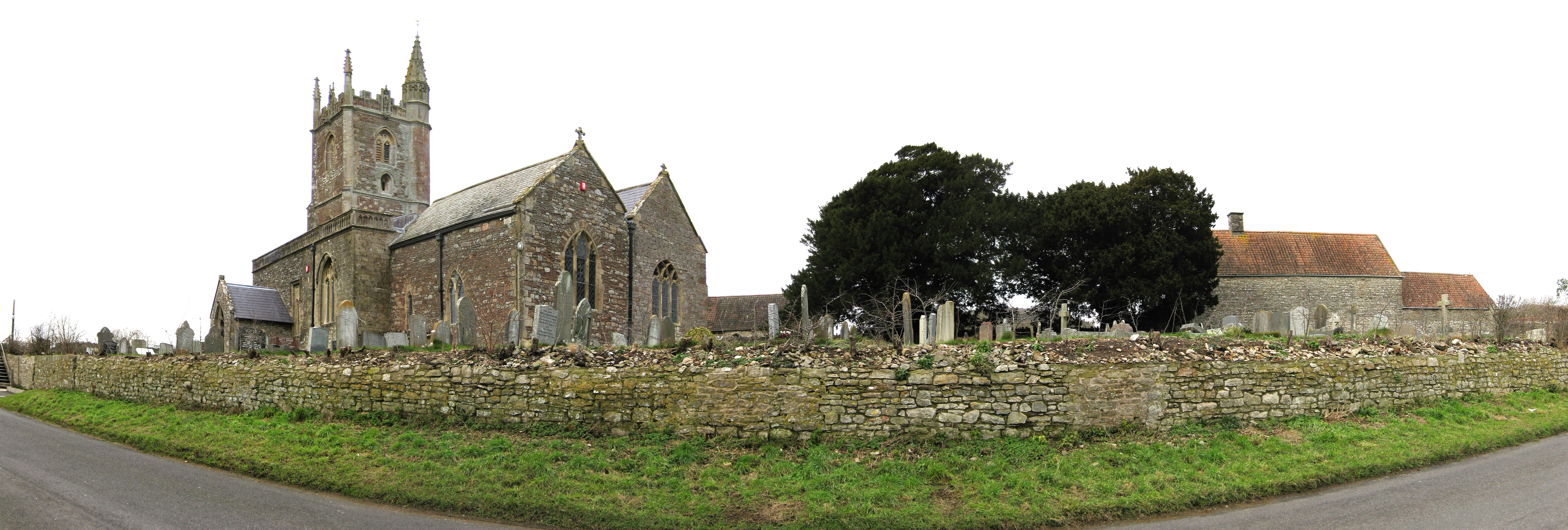
Church of SS Quiricus & Julietta

The parish Church of St. Quiricus and St. Julietta has 11th-century origins, with the nave and chancel being extended by the addition of aisles and the south chapel in the early 13th century. It has been designated as a Grade I listed building.

The church's dedication is extremely unusual — there are three similar dedications in the UK, two in Cornwall, and one at Swaffham Prior, in Cambridgeshire.
