= Cadbury Camp =

Iron Age hillfort in Somerset, England

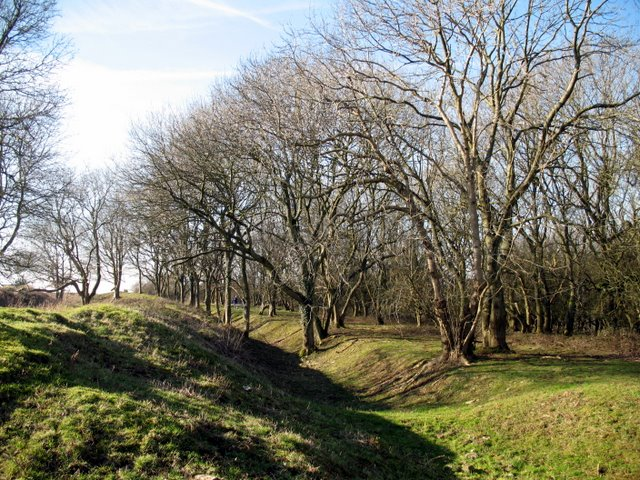
- Tree growth on the ramparts at Cadbury Camp

- Location within Somerset
- 51°26′55″N 2°47′13″W
- Location: Tickenham, Somerset, England
- OS grid reference: ST 45406 72467

History
- Built: Iron Age

Scheduled monument
- Official name: Cadbury Camp
- Designated: 17 October 1930
- Reference no.: 1008295

Cadbury Camp is an Iron Age hill fort in Somerset, England, near the village of Tickenham. It is a scheduled monument. Although primarily known as a fort during the Iron Age it is likely, from artefacts, including a bronze spear or axe head, discovered at the site, that it was first used in the Bronze Age and still occupied through the Roman era into the sub-Roman period when the area became part of a Celtic kingdom. The name may mean "Fort of Cador" - Cado(r) being possibly the regional king or warlord controlling Somerset, Bristol, and South Gloucestershire, in the middle to late 5th century. Cador has been associated with King Arthur, though the only evidence for this is the reference in two hagiographies of Saint Carannog to Arthur and Cador ruling from Din Draithou (perhaps the hillfort at Dundry) and having the power over western Somerset to grant Carantoc's plea to build a church at Carhampton. Geoffrey of Monmouth invented the title 'Duke of Cornwall' for Cador in his misleading History of the Kings of Britain.

The 7-acre (2.8 ha) hill fort is well preserved, and is managed by the National Trust through a Higher Level Stewardship agreement with Natural England which involves tree clearing, including non-native Turkey Oaks, and management of the scrub.

The name Cadbury is derived from "Cada's byrig"; byrig is the Anglo-Saxon word meaning "fort" or "town", which is frequently, but not exclusively, used to refer to hill-forts. It is one of three sites in Somerset to include the Cadbury name, the others being Cadbury Castle, near South Cadbury and Cadbury Hill which is also known as Cadbury-Congresbury to distinguish it from the other sites.

== Location ==
Cadbury Camp is situated on a natural ridge between the Gordano Valley and the North Somerset Levels, next to the Limebreach Wood ancient woodland and nature reserve.

== History ==
The hill fort was constructed during the Iron Age, probably by the local Dobunni tribe, however the details are not fully known. The discovery of a bronze spear or axe head at the site indicates use before the Iron Age. The Bronze Age spearhead is in the Museum of Somerset in Taunton.

Hill forts developed in the Late Bronze and Early Iron Age, roughly the start of the first millennium BC. The reason for their emergence in Britain, and their purpose, has been a subject of debate. It has been argued that they could have been military sites constructed in response to invasion from continental Europe, sites built by invaders, or a military reaction to social tensions caused by an increasing population and consequent pressure on agriculture. The dominant view since the 1960s has been that the increasing use of iron led to social changes in Britain. Deposits of iron ore were located in different places to the tin and copper ore necessary to make bronze, and as a result trading patterns shifted and the old elites lost their economic and social status. Power passed into the hands of a new group of people. Archaeologist Barry Cunliffe believes that population increase still played a role and has stated "the forts provided defensive possibilities for the community at those times when the stress of an increasing population burst out into open warfare. But I would not see them as having been built because there was a state of war. They would be functional as defensive strongholds when there were tensions and undoubtedly some of them were attacked and destroyed, but this was not the only, or even the most significant, factor in their construction".

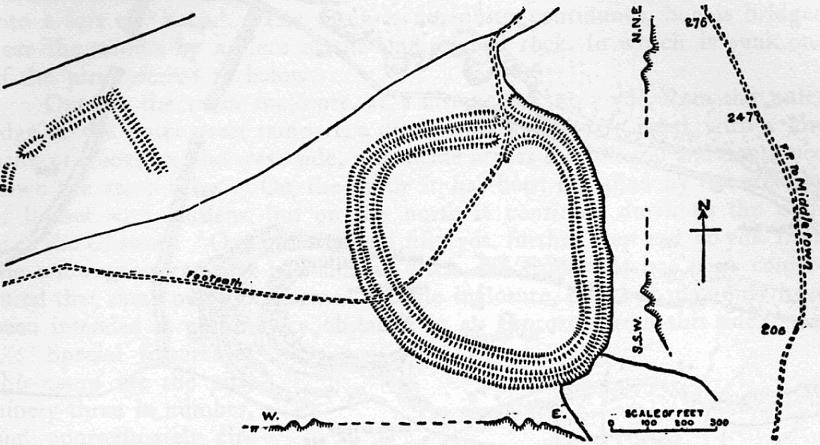
Plan of earthworks at Cadbury Camp, Tickenham

The fort, which covers about 7 acres (2.8 ha), consisted of ditches and earth banks topped with a wooden fence in an elevated position above the marshy land below. The ramparts are 45 feet (14 m) apart. It extends approximately 190 metres (620 ft) from north to south and 160 metres (520 ft) from east to west. The ditch is around 2 metres (6 ft 7 in) deep and the ramparts rise up around 1.5 metres (4 ft 11 in).

After the Iron Age occupation may have continued into the Roman era indicated by the discovery of pottery fragments, a small stone statue of Mars possibly from a Roman temple and coins of Claudius Gothicus and Valentinian II. The site may still have been occupied into the Anglo-Saxon period. Several of the finds were uncovered during excavations by Harold St George Gray in 1922, although the coin dating from around 370 was discovered in 1945 and a Romano-British relief in the inner defensive ditch in 1974. The relief was given to Weston Museum, and loaned to Bristol City Museum and Art Gallery.

During World War II the site was used for bomb disposal and as the location for a searchlight battery.

== Current management ==
The site was once part of the estate linked to Clevedon Court. It is now managed via a Higher Level Stewardship agreement between the National Trust and Natural England. This has involved removing trees whose roots are growing into the earthen banks of the site. In particular non-native Turkey Oaks, which provide a habitat for damaging Gall wasps, are being removed. Cattle are also being used to manage the scrub and encourage the growth of flowers such as orchids.

== Myths and legends ==
Local legends associate it with Arthurian England and Camelot, though these may be due to confusion with the better-known Cadbury Castle, near South Cadbury some 50 miles to the south.

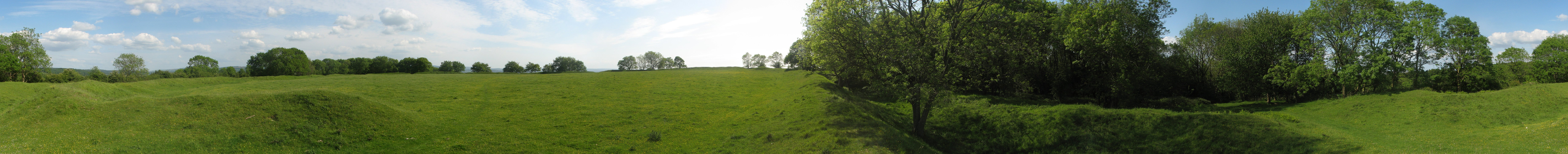
360° Panoramic view of Cadbury Camp. This photograph was taken from the edge of the camp, which caused a distorted perspective.

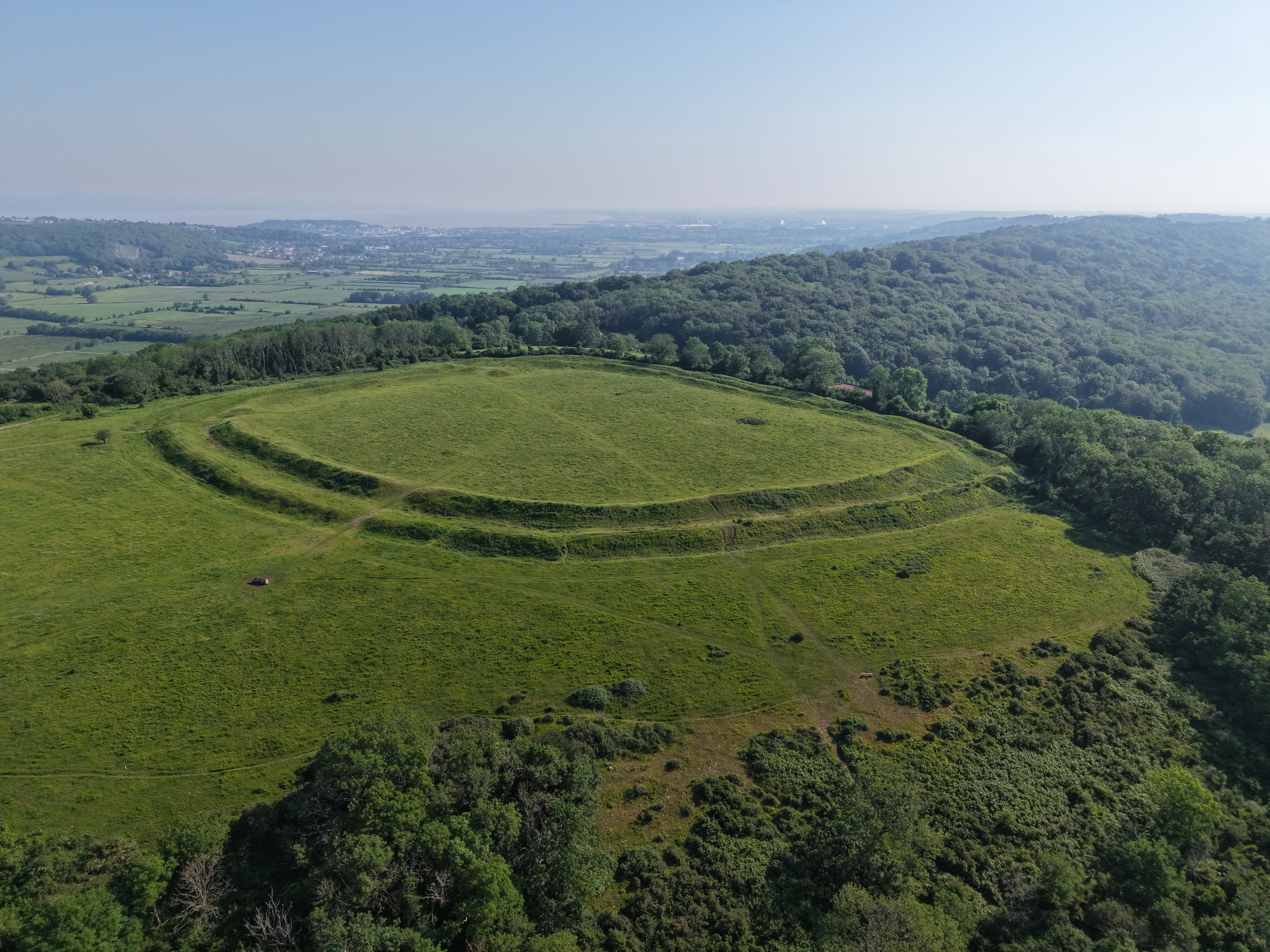
Cadbury Camp from the South West

== See also ==
- List of hillforts and ancient settlements in Somerset
- List of National Trust properties in Somerset
