= List of museums in Somerset =

The English ceremonial county of Somerset contains a wide range of museums, defined here as institutions (including nonprofit organisations, government entities, and private businesses) that collect and care for objects of cultural, artistic, scientific, or historical interest and make their collections or related exhibits available for public viewing. Non-profit art galleries and university art galleries are also included, but museums that exist only in cyberspace (i.e., virtual museums) are not.

Many of the museums are in listed buildings. In the United Kingdom, this signifies a building which has been placed on the Statutory List of Buildings of Special Architectural or Historic Interest. In England and Wales, the authority for listing is granted by the Planning (Listed Buildings and Conservation Areas) Act 1990, and is administered by English Heritage. Listed buildings in danger of decay are included on English Heritage's Heritage at Risk Register. There are three types of listed status: Grade I, for buildings "of exceptional interest, sometimes considered to be internationally important"; Grade II*, for "particularly important buildings of more than special interest"; and Grade II, for buildings that are "nationally important and of special interest".

Many of the museums have been accredited by the Museums, Libraries and Archives Council, which sets national standards for museums in the UK. Several are art galleries providing space for the exhibition of art, or are philatelic, regimental, science, aviation, transport, railway, toy, religious or sports museums, but the majority are local museums. There are also several historic house museums owned or managed by the National Trust or English Heritage.

== Museums ==
Name	Photograph	Town/City	District	Type	Summary
American Museum and Gardens		Claverton; 51.3768°N 2.311°W	Bath and North East Somerset	Art	The house, designed by Jeffry Wyattville and built in 1820, is now a Grade I listed building. The museum was founded by two antique collectors, American Dallas Pratt and British-born John Judkyn, and opened to the public in July 1961. The exhibits cover every period of American history, but because Judkyn was a peace-loving Quaker, the museum contains no militaria. Included are 200 quilts and coverlets, and several pieces of Shaker furniture.
Ashton Windmill		Chapel Allerton; 51.2488°N 2.8402°W	Somerset	Mill	A tower mill dating from the 18th century, it was modernised in 1900 with machinery brought from the demolished Moorlinch mill, and iron hoops were added around the building. It was restored in 1967. The mill has been designated by English Heritage as a Grade II* listed building. Now preserved, it was given to Bristol City Museum in 1966. It is owned by Sedgemoor District Council, and maintained by volunteers. In 2010, Sedgemoor Council decided it could no longer afford to maintain the windmill, and appealed for an independent group of trustees to take on responsibility for the building.
Bakelite Museum		Williton; 51.1648°N 3.3087°W	Somerset	Multiple	The museum is housed in the Orchard Millhouse, which has been designated as a Grade II listed building. It is home to a collection of vintage plastics ranging from radios, cameras and telephones to a Bakelite coffin.
Barrington Court		Barrington; 50.9626°N 2.877°W	Somerset	Historic house	A Tudor manor house begun c. 1538 and completed in the late 1550s, with a vernacular 17th-century stable court (1675), it was the first house acquired by the National Trust, in 1907, and was leased to Col. Lyle of Tate & Lyle in the 1920s. Barrington Court has an Arts and Crafts-style gardens for which garden designer Gertrude Jekyll provided planting plans.
Bath Abbey Heritage Vaults Museum		Bath; 51.3815°N 2.3587°W	Bath and North East Somerset	Religious	Located in the restored 18th century cellars, the museum features artefacts and exhibits about the Bath Abbey's history. Displays include the different buildings on the site and their uses, the Abbey's impact on the community, the construction, architecture and sculptures of the buildings, artefacts and sculptures, and the role of the Abbey in present times.
Bath Postal Museum		Bath; 51.3815°N 2.3587°W	Bath and North East Somerset	Philatelic	The museum was founded in 1979. In 1984 it moved to a home in Broad Street, which was the site of Bath's main Post Office from 1822 to 1854. It has been designated as a Grade II listed building. Artefacts on display included quills and ink wells, stamp boxes, post boxes, post horns, clay tablets, strip maps, model mail coaches, letters and postcards. There is also a replica Victorian post office.
Bath Royal Literary and Scientific Institution		Bath; 51.3836°N 2.3636°W	Bath and North East Somerset	Multiple	The Institution's antiquarian library contains over 7,000 volumes, and includes the Jenyns and the Broome natural history libraries. Its archives contain bound volumes of letters from eminent scientists and naturalists such as Charles Darwin, Professor John Stevens Henslow and Sir Joseph Dalton Hooker. Smaller collections cover theology, government, travel and local history. Four paintings by Andrea Casali and a photography collection by the Reverend Francis Lockey (1796–1869) are also featured. It is housed in 16–18, Queen Square, a Grade I listed Greek Revival building designed by John Pinch the younger in 1830.
Beckford's Tower and Museum		Bath; 51.4066°N 2.3789°W	Bath and North East Somerset	Biographical	The 120-foot (37 m) high Beckford's Tower was completed in 1827. It contains a collection of furniture, paintings and art that belonged to the writer, collector and patron of the arts William Beckford. The tower is owned by the Bath Preservation Trust and managed by the Beckford Tower Trust. It is available to rent as a holiday home through the Landmark Trust, and has been designated as a Grade I listed building.
Bishops Lydeard Mill and Rural Life Museum		Bishops Lydeard; 51.0546°N 3.1855°W	Somerset	Mill	The building dates from the 18th century. It has an overshot waterwheel and has been designated as a Grade II listed building. Since 2000, the building has been renovated. It was opened by the town Mayor in 2003. The water wheel weighs over two tonnes and is driven by water from Back Stream, which originates in the Brendon Hills. The museum focuses on traditional trades and crafts, including a wheelwright's shop, cooper's shop, saddler's shop, blacksmith's shop and a Victorian kitchen.
Bishop's Palace		Wells; 51.2093°N 2.64255°W	Somerset	Historic house	The medieval palace home of the Bishops of Bath and Wells has been designated as a Grade I listed building. The building was begun around 1210 by Bishop Jocelin of Wells, but principally dates from 1230. It was restored, divided, and the upper storey added by Benjamin Ferrey between 1846 and 1854. The chapel was built between 1275 and 1292 for Bishop Robert Burnell. The gatehouse has a bridge over the moat, and dates from 1341. There are 14 acres (5.7 ha) of gardens, including St. Andrew's Spring, from which the city takes its name.
Blagdon Lake Pumping Station and Visitor Centre		Blagdon; 51.209293°N 2.64255°W	North Somerset	Technology	The museum includes science and environment exhibits and hands-on displays as well as a room dedicated to the charity WaterAid. One of the two steam-driven beam engines is still working occasionally. Outside, there is a nature trail and space for picnics. In 1984, it was decided to preserve the two remaining engines and incorporate them as the central feature in the visitor centre, including a museum in the old boiler house, which opened in 1988 and attracts over 30,000 visitors a year. The pumping station is now a Grade II listed building.
Blake Museum		Bridgwater; 51.1285°N 2.9938°W	Somerset	Local	The building is believed to be the birthplace of Robert Blake, General at Sea (1599–1657). It was built in the late 15th or early 16th century, and has been designated as a Grade II* listed building. Particular features of the museum, founded in 1926, are artefacts from Blake's life, including his sea chest.
Blue Anchor Railway Museum		Blue Anchor; 51.1815°N 3.4024°W	Somerset	Railway	The station buildings have been restored and the waiting room on the westbound platform was converted to a railway museum in 1985. It opened in 1986 under the auspices of the West Somerset Railway Steam Trust. Staffing is provided by the Friends of Blue Anchor Railway Museum, who also undertake fundraising activities. The museum now contains around 550 items, mainly related to the Great Western Railway or other West Country lines.
Bruton Museum		Bruton; 51.112°N 2.45°W	Somerset	Local	The museum is housed in the Dovecote Building, in Bruton's High Street.
Castle Cary and District Museum		Castle Cary; 51.0896°N 2.5141°W	Somerset	Local	The museum is housed in the Market House, a Grade II* listed building. There is a varied collection of exhibits; the earliest are local fossils including ammonites, with a display about the discovery of an ichthyosaurus at Alford. Local industry and agriculture are represented by displays on the production of rope and hemp. There are also examples of agricultural implements, tools and relics, with an explanation of the local geology. Information is also provided about Cary Castle, and a room is dedicated to the life and work of Parson James Woodforde.
Chard Museum		Chard; 50.8728°N 2.9587°W	Somerset	Local	Housed in a 16th century thatched building. Exhibits tell the story of the town and the local area including the geology, the fire of 1577, the Monmouth Rebellion, and the local lace mills. Outside there is a blacksmith's forge and display of farm machinery. There are also displays on notable people with connections to the town: John Stringfellow and William Samuel Henson, who achieved the first powered flight, James Gillingham, who pioneered the development of articulated artificial limbs, Corporal Samuel Vickery who was awarded the Victoria Cross in 1897 during the Tirah Campaign, and Margaret Bondfield, the UK's first woman cabinet minister.
Cheddar Caves and Gorge		Cheddar; 51.2824°N 2.7655°W	Somerset	Archaeology	This includes the Cheddar Man Museum of Prehistory, which contains information about the caves and their palaeontological development. The exhibits include original flint tools and human remains excavated from the caves.
Claverton Pumping Station		Claverton; 51.3781°N 2.3017°W	Bath and North East Somerset	Technology	A water pumping station with waterwheel that pumps water from the River Avon to the Kennet and Avon Canal using power from the flow of the River Avon; it has been designated as a Grade II listed building.
Cleeve Abbey		Washford; 51.1556°N 3.3642°W	Somerset	Religious	At this site there are the remains of a medieval monastery founded in the late 12th century, which have been designated as a Grade I listed building, and it is listed as a Scheduled Ancient Monument.
Clevedon Court		Clevedon; 51.4407°N 2.8335°W	North Somerset	Historic house	Operated by the National Trust, this 14th-century manor house contains collections of Nailsea glass and Eltonware pottery. It has been designated as a Grade I listed building.
Coleridge Cottage		Nether Stowey; 51.1521°N 3.1537°W	Somerset	Historic house	Operated by the National Trust, this home of poet Samuel Taylor Coleridge was constructed in the 17th century. It has been designated as a Grade II* listed building.
Cothay Manor		Stawley; 50.9729°N 3.3418°W	Somerset	Historic house	A 15th-century medieval manor and gardens, built around 1480, it now has a Grade I listing, and is considered by many to be the most perfect of small, classic, medieval buildings in England today, rating four stars in Simon Jenkins' England’s Thousand Best Houses.
Crewkerne and District Museum	–	Crewkerne; 50.8854°N 2.7951°W	Somerset	Local	The museum opened in 2000 in an old house with an 18th-century frontage. It was restored with the help of grants from the Heritage Lottery Fund, Somerset County Council, South Somerset District Council and Crewkerne Town Council. Exhibits cover the development of Crewkerne during the 18th and 19th centuries, with particular emphasis on the flax and linen industry. Other collections relate to local archaeology, coins and medals, costume and textiles, fine art, music, personalities, science and technology, social history, weapons and war.
Dunster Castle		Dunster; 51.1825°N 3.4459°W	Somerset	Historic house	Operated by the National Trust, Dunster is a medieval castle with 19th-century remodelling. It has been designated as a Grade I listed building. During 2009 it received 134,502 visitors. It is home to the National Plant Collection of Strawberry Trees.
Dunster Museum & Doll Collection	–	Dunster; 51.1824°N 3.4459°W	Somerset	Toy	The museum contains over 800 dolls from around the world.
Dunster Working Watermill		Dunster; 51.1825°N 3.4459°W	Somerset	Mill	This watermill in the grounds of Dunster Castle, built around 1780 and restored to working order in 1979, is on the site of a mill mentioned in the Domesday Book. It has been designated as a Grade II listed building, and is operated by the National Trust.
East Somerset Railway		Cranmore; 51.1902°N 2.4801°W	Somerset	Railway	A heritage railway and museum, located at the old station, it contains a red telephone box that incorporates a stamp machine and post box (one of only 50 made), produced around 1927. Opposite the platform, there is a signal box dating from 1904, which is in the standard Great Western Railway pattern of the period.
Farleigh Hungerford Castle		Farleigh Hungerford; 51.3172°N 2.2847°W	Bath and North East Somerset	Historic house	Built around 1370, it has been designated as a Grade I listed building and Scheduled Ancient Monument. It is operated by English Heritage. A medieval priest's house, chapel and castle house remain.
Fashion Museum, Bath		Bath; 51.3862°N 2.3624°W	Bath and North East Somerset	Textile	Previously known as the Museum of Costume, it is housed in the Assembly Rooms. The collection was started by Doris Langley Moore, who gave her collection to the city of Bath in 1963. The collection focuses on fashionable dress for men, women and children from the late 16th century to the present day and has more than 30,000 objects in its collection. Every year since its creation in 1963, an independent fashion expert has been asked to select a dress for entry into this part of the collection. The designers whose work is represented include Mary Quant, John Bates, Ossie Clark, Jean Muir, Giorgio Armani, John Galliano, Ralph Lauren, Alexander McQueen, Donatella Versace and Alber Elbaz.
Fleet Air Arm Museum		RNAS Yeovilton; 51.0136°N 2.6448°W	Somerset	Aviation	The museum has an extensive collection of military and civilian aircraft, as well as models of Royal Navy ships, especially aircraft carriers. There are some interactive displays. It is located by RNAS Yeovilton, and the museum has viewing areas where visitors can watch military aircraft (especially helicopters) take off and land. There are 94 aircraft in the museum's collection.
Frome Museum		Frome; 51.2328°N 2.3191°W	Somerset	Local	A collection of local history, this museum has a particularly important collection of artefacts from the bronze foundry of J. W. Singer. A display is devoted to the Butler and Tanner printing works in the town, including an old printing press. Another display exhibits photographs, diagrams, plans and tools from James Fussell's Ironworks of Mells. Other displays show items from Bussman Cooper (later Beswicks), the Marston House Fire Engine, local blacksmithing, a chemist shop from Bath Street and a collection of Victorian and later costumes. The Italianate building was built as a Literary and Scientific Institute in 1865. It is a Grade II listed building.
Fyne Court		Broomfield; 51.0806°N 3.1143°W	Somerset	Historic house	A National Trust-owned nature reserve and visitor centre, Fyne Court once belonged to the pioneering 19th-century electrician Andrew Crosse, whose family had owned the house from its construction. It burnt down in 1898. Fyne Court has been in the ownership of the National Trust since 1967. The Quantock Hills Area of Outstanding Natural Beauty Service have their headquarters in the grounds.
Gants Mill		Pitcombe; 51.1064°N 2.4669°W	Somerset	Mill	Much of the current mill was built in 1810 but it includes parts of the 18th-century building and possibly some material from earlier mills. It is a Grade II* listed building. Most of the machinery, including the grindstones, conveyors, sack hoist and grain bins, dates from 1888, and is still used for grinding animal feed and occasionally whole wheat flour. The South Somerset Hydropower Group was begun in 2001 and the first turbine, at Gants Mill, was commissioned in 2003. The water garden includes seasonal displays of iris, roses, delphiniums, day lilies, clematis, and dahlias.
Glastonbury Abbey		Glastonbury; 51.1456°N 2.7144°W	Somerset	Living	There are portrayals of 14th-century monks, kitchen maids, pilgrims, and King Arthur's court, as well as exhibits of the history and artefacts of the abbey. The ruins of the great church, along with the Lady Chapel, have Grade I listed status, and are set in 36 acres (150,000 m^{2}) of parkland that is open to the public. It is approached by the Abbey Gatehouse, which was built in the mid-14th century and completely restored in 1810.
Glastonbury Lake Village Museum		Glastonbury; 51.1462°N 2.7098°W	Somerset	Archaeology	The Tribunal was built in the 15th century as a merchant's house. It has been designated as a Grade I listed building. It now houses the Glastonbury Lake Village Museum, containing Iron Age possessions and works of art from the Glastonbury Lake Village, which were preserved in almost perfect condition in the peat after the village was abandoned. The museum is run by the Glastonbury Antiquarian Society.
Haynes International Motor Museum		Sparkford; 51.0355°N 2.5656°W	Somerset	Automobile	The museum contains over 400 cars and motorcycles and a collection of other automobilia. The museum, which was established in 1985, is an Educational Charitable Trust chaired by John Haynes OBE, of Haynes Publishing Group, the company which publishes the Haynes Manuals.
Helicopter Museum		Weston-super-Mare; 51.3395°N 2.9303°W	North Somerset	Aviation	The museum houses a collection of more than 80 helicopters and autogyros from around the world, both civilian and military, particularly from the Soviet Union and Eastern Bloc. Examples include the Kamov Ka-26 Hoodlum and the Mi-24 Hind, as well as more modern machines such as the EH-101.
Herschel Museum of Astronomy		Bath; 51.3825°N 2.3667°W	Bath and North East Somerset	Science	The museum is dedicated to the life and works of astronomer William Herschel and his sister Caroline Herschel. It is situated in the Herschels' former home, which has been designated as a Grade II* listed building. Many astronomical and musical artefacts are on display, including a replica of the telescope with which Herschel discovered Uranus, and a full-scale reproduction of a lamp micrometer.
Holburne Museum of Art		Bath; 51.3857°N 2.3511°W	Bath and North East Somerset	Art	Part of the University of Bath, the building was originally designed as the Sydney Hotel, and was built by Charles Harcourt Masters in 1795–6. It has been designated as a Grade I listed building. It houses the art collection formed by Sir William Holburne including silver-gilt, Old Master paintings, Italian bronzes such as the Susioni once owned by King Louis XIV, maiolica, porcelain, glass, furniture and portrait miniatures. These have been added to with examples of landscapes by Francesco Guardi and J. M. W. Turner, and portraits by George Stubbs, Allan Ramsay, Johann Zoffany and Thomas Gainsborough.
Ilchester Museum		Ilchester; 51.0016°N 2.6838°W	Somerset	Local	The museum is housed in the Town Hall House, which is a Grade II listed building. It contains exhibits showing the history of the town from the Iron Age and Roman periods, when it was known as Lindinis, to the present day. They include the town's 13th-century mace or staff of office, bearing the insignia of Richard I, which is the oldest staff of office in England. The collection also includes a full set of Maundy Money, acquired in 1995.
Jane Austen Centre		Bath; 51.3851°N 2.3633°W	Bath and North East Somerset	Biographical	The museum concentrates on author Jane Austen's family and her life in Bath.
King John's Hunting Lodge		Axbridge; 51.287167°N 2.81851°W	Somerset	Historic house	Operated by the National Trust, this is an early Tudor timber-framed wool merchant's house with local history exhibits. It is run as a local history museum by Axbridge and District Museum Trust, in co-operation with Sedgemoor District Council, Somerset County Museums Service and Axbridge Archaeological and Local History Society, and is a Grade II* listed building.
Lambretta Scooter Museum	–	Weston-super-Mare; 51.3485°N 2.97°W	North Somerset	Transportation	The museum houses a total of 61 Lambretta models – at least one from each year between October 1947 and May 1971. The private collection ranges from three model "A"s, first produced in 1947, to Lambro three wheelers, Lambretta mopeds, sales leaflets, accessories, posters, magazines, manuals, toys, models, signs, and promotional material. The museum was re-opened on 9 August 2008, after refurbishment of it and its exhibits.
Langport and River Parrett Visitor Centre	–	Langport; 51.0351°N 2.8359°W	Somerset	Local	Situated by Bow Bridge over the River Parrett, the Langport Visitor Centre has displays and exhibitions related to local history, industry and the natural history of the river. It is also a central point for information about the River Parrett Trail, a long-distance footpath, following the route of the River Parrett. The trail, which is 50 miles (80 km) long, runs from Chedington in Dorset to the mouth of the river in Bridgwater Bay, where it joins the West Somerset Coast Path.
Lytes Cary Manor		Charlton Mackrell; 51.0358°N 2.6677°W	Somerset	Historic house	The property, owned by the National Trust, has parts dating to the 14th century, with other sections dating to the 15th, 16th, 18th, and 20th centuries. The house is listed as Grade I. The chapel predates the existing house, and functioned as a chantry chapel, where masses could be said for the souls of the family, both living and dead. The gardens are listed as Grade II on the English Heritage Register of Parks and Gardens of Special Historic Interest in England.
Market House Museum		Watchet; 51.1795°N 3.3242°W	Somerset	Local	The building was constructed in 1820 on the site of the previous market house, which had been demolished in 1805. It was converted into a museum in 1979. It is a Grade II listed building, housing a collection of exhibits about the natural history of Watchet and the surrounding area. The focus is on nautical and maritime history of the port. The museum's collection includes artefacts from archaeology, coins and medals, land and maritime transport, natural sciences, science and technology and social history.
Montacute House		Montacute; 50.9524°N 2.716°W	Somerset	Historic house	Operated by the National Trust, the museum includes an Elizabethan mansion with 16th-century furniture and textiles, a Long Gallery with over 60 Tudor and Elizabethan portraits from the National Portrait Gallery collection and gardens. It has been designated as a Grade I listed building and Scheduled Ancient Monument, and was visited by 110,529 people in 2009.
Montacute TV Radio Toy Museum	–	Montacute; 50.9493°N 2.7149°W	Somerset	Media	The museum has a collection of toys, games and jigsaws related to radio and TV programmes. There are also over 500 radios from vintage wirelesses to novelty transistors, radiograms and televisions.
Muchelney Abbey		Muchelney; 51.0167°N 2.8203°W	Somerset	Religious	Operated by English Heritage, it comprises the remains and foundations of a medieval Benedictine abbey, the site of an earlier Anglo-Saxon abbey, and an early Tudor house dating from the 16th century, which was formerly the lodgings of the resident abbot.
Museum of Bath Architecture		Bath; 51.3794°N 2.36°W	Bath and North East Somerset	History	The collection contains architectural models, maps, paintings and reconstructions showing how a typical Georgian house was constructed.
Museum of Bath at Work		Bath; 51.3889°N 2.3629°W	Bath and North East Somerset	Local	This museum was established in 1978 to present the commercial development of Bath over the last 2,000 years. The main exhibit is the reconstruction of an engineering and mineral water manufacturing business set up by Victorian entrepreneur Jonathan Bowler in 1864. The museum's displays, occupying four floors, also cover local history, including industry and trades, and detail the city's development as a retailing and manufacturing centre, and as a tourist and health resort.
Museum of East Asian Art		Bath; 51.3794°N 2.367°W	Bath and North East Somerset	Art	The restored Georgian house contains a collection of ceramics, jades, bronzes and bamboo carvings from China, Japan, Korea and Southeast Asia. In total there are almost 2,000 objects, ranging in date from c. 5000 BC to the present day.
Museum of Somerset		Taunton; 51.0191°N 3.1°W	Somerset	Multiple	Located in Taunton Castle, the museum contains a collection of toys and dolls, sculpture, natural history, fossils, fine silver and pottery, as well as a collection of archaeological items, including the mosaic found at the Low Ham Roman Villa. One of the exhibits is the Chi-Rho amulet found in Shepton Mallet, held to be among the earliest evidence of Christianity in England. In October 2007, plans for a £6.5 million improvement to the museum and the castle were submitted by Somerset County Council to the Heritage Lottery Fund. The museum closed to the public on 18 April 2008 for a two-year refit, and is planned to re-open in 2011 as the Museum of Somerset.
No. 1 Royal Crescent		Bath; 51.3868°N 2.3671°W	Bath and North East Somerset	Historic house	Number 1 Royal Crescent was built between 1767 and 1774 by John Wood the Younger. It is now a museum, maintained by the Bath Preservation Trust, illustrating how wealthy owners of the Georgian period might have furnished such a house. It was purchased in 1967 by Major Bernard Cayzer and donated to the trust along with funds to restore and furnish it.
Porlock Museum		Porlock; 51.2088°N 3.5956°W	Somerset	Local	The building was built as the Dovery Manor house in the late 15th century and extended in the 17th century. In 1895 the building was restored by Edmund Buckle for Sir Charles Chadwyck-Healey. It is a Grade II* listed building. The museum has a collection of artefacts, photographs, press cuttings, paintings and displays of local interest, particularly relating to Porlock Hill on the A39. At the rear of the building a herb garden is being restored with plants grown for medicinal and culinary use when the manor was built.
Priest's House		Muchelney; 51.0211°N 2.8152°W	Somerset	Religious	Now operated by the National Trust, this house was built by Muchelney Abbey in 1308 for the parish priest, and incorporates a Gothic doorway, tracery windows and a 15th-century fireplace. The building was said to be "ruinous" in 1608. It was used by the vicar or curate until around 1840, when the house was used as a cellar and later as a school, and in the late 19th century it was rented by a farmer. The building was acquired by the British National Trust in 1911, who rent it to a tenant who provides limited access to the public. It has been designated as a Grade II listed building.
Radstock Museum		Radstock; 51.2936°N 2.4486°W	Bath and North East Somerset	Multiple	Housed in the restored and converted Victorian Market Hall, a Grade II listed building dating from 1897. The main display covers the defunct Somerset Coalfield, and the local trades and industries that supported the Radstock mining community.
Roman Baths		Bath; 51.3809°N 2.3595°W	Bath and North East Somerset	Archaeology	This is a well-preserved Roman site for public bathing. The Roman Baths themselves are below the modern street level. There are four main features: the Sacred Spring, the Roman Temple, the Roman Bath House and the Museum, which holds finds from Roman Bath. The buildings above street level date from the 19th century.
Sally Lunn's House		Bath; 51.3815°N 2.3599°W	Bath and North East Somerset	Historic house	This tea and eating house, with a period kitchen, dates from the 17th century house, and is where the Sally Lunn bun originated.
Shoe Museum		Street; 51.129°N 2.7394°W	Somerset	Industry	The museum gives the history of the C&J Clark shoe manufacturer, and exhibits shoes dating from the Roman era to the present day. There is also a display of machinery used in footwear production, a selection of shop display showcards from the 1930s, 1950s, and 1960s, and television advertisements.
Somerset and Dorset Railway Heritage Centre		Midsomer Norton; 51.2811°N 2.4833°W	Bath and North East Somerset	Railway	Based at Midsomer Norton railway station, the site includes restored station buildings, a signalbox and a goods shed. The museum is located in an old stable block. It has almost a quarter of a mile of railway and a diesel locomotive.
Somerset and Dorset Railway Trust Museum		Washford; 51.1617°N 3.3681°W	Somerset	Railway	The museum contains relics of the Somerset and Dorset Joint Railway (S&DJR), including station nameboards, lamps, tools, signalling equipment, tickets, photographs, handbills, rolling stock and steam locomotives. The Trust's Peckett and Sons 0-4-0ST No. 1788 "Kilmersdon" is normally based here. Next to the original stone station building of 1874 is a much smaller wooden building, which was originally the Great Western Railway's signal box. This structure now houses a recreation of the interior of the S&DJR signal-box at Midford. A second signal box is used as part of a signalling display in the yard, and was formerly used on the S&DJR at Burnham-on-Sea.
Somerset Brick and Tile Museum		Bridgwater; 51.1285°N 2.9938°W	Somerset	Industry	The museum is dedicated to the brick and tile industry of Somerset. It incorporates the last surviving "pinnacle kiln" in Bridgwater, which dates from the 19th century, and has been designated as a Scheduled Ancient Monument and Grade II* listed building. The kiln was one of six at the former Barham Brothers' Yard at East Quay. It was last fired in 1965, the year that the works closed. Demonstrated inside are the tools, methods and processes involved in making a variety of bricks, tiles, and terracotta plaques.
Somerset Cricket Museum		Taunton; 51.0189°N 3.0989°W	Somerset	Sports	The building, which is within the confines of the County Ground, is the Old Priory Barn, a Grade II* listed building. It is the only surviving building of the Augustinian Taunton Priory, which was founded about 1115. In 1989 the museum was opened to the public, with exhibits and displays covering the cricket club's history including Test match players such as Ian Botham and Marcus Trescothick. It also has a section devoted to the England women's cricket team, and a collection of I Zingari memorabilia.
Somerset Military Museum		Taunton; 51.0191°N 3.1°W	Somerset	Military	This presents the history and memorabilia of several of the area's regiments, and is located within the Museum of Somerset at Taunton Castle. The museum includes medals, uniforms and other historical artefacts related to the local regiments: Somerset Light Infantry (Prince Albert's), Somerset and Cornwall Light Infantry, West Somerset Yeomanry, North Somerset Yeomanry, Somerset Militia, Rifle Volunteers and Territorials, The Light Infantry and its successor regiment, The Rifles.
Somerset Rural Life Museum		Glastonbury; 51.1485°N 2.714°W	Somerset	Rural	A museum of the social and agricultural history of Somerset, housed in buildings surrounding a 14th-century barn once belonging to Glastonbury Abbey, and once used as a tithe barn. It has been designated as a Grade I listed building and is a Scheduled Ancient Monument. The barn and courtyard contain displays of farm machinery from the Victorian or early 20th-century period.
Stembridge Tower Mill		High Ham; 51.0765°N 2.8203°W	Somerset	Mill	Operated by the National Trust, it is the last remaining thatched windmill in England and the last survivor of five windmills that once existed in the area. Constructed in 1822, the mill has been designated as a Grade II* listed building. The mill is owned by the National Trust and underwent a £100,000 restoration by local craftsmen funded by the Grantscape Community Heritage Fund in 2009; it re-opened later that year.
Treasurer's House		Martock; 51.0211°N 2.8152°W	Somerset	Historic house	Operated by the National Trust, this is a medieval priest's house built from Hamstone during the 13th century, with various extensions and alterations since. The Great Hall was completed in 1293, but there is an even earlier Solar Block with an interesting wall painting. It has been designated as a Grade I listed building.
Tropiquaria		Watchet; 51.16°N 3.3483°W	Somerset	Multiple	Tropiquaria includes a tropical hall with a variety of snakes and lizards, caiman and small carnivores such as dwarf mongooses. Outside are macaws, agoutis, gibbons, wallabies, emus, tapir, ring-tailed lemurs, ruffed lemurs and meerkats. The building was an art deco BBC transmitter hall built in the 1930s, and it includes a museum with radios and radio memorabilia.
Tyntesfield		Wraxall; 51.4403°N 2.7135°W	North Somerset	Historic house	The estate, which is owned and operated by the National Trust, includes the Victorian Gothic Revival house gardens. The house, which is built of Bath Stone, includes the servants' wing and the chapel. It was designated as a Grade II* listed building in 1973 and has since been upgraded to Grade I. The principal rooms include the library, drawing room, billiard room and dining room.
Victoria Art Gallery		Bath; 51.3794°N 2.367°W	Bath and North East Somerset	Art	This is a free public art museum containing paintings, sculpture and decorative arts. The building was designed in 1897 by John McKean Brydon, and has been designated as a Grade II listed building. The exterior of the building includes a statue of Queen Victoria, by A. C. Lucchesi, and friezes of classical figures by George Anderson Lawson. The museum contains over 1,500 decorative arts treasures, including a display of British oil paintings from the 17th century to the present day, such as works by Thomas Gainsborough, Thomas Jones Barker and Walter Sickert.
Watchet Boat Museum		Watchet; 51.1795°N 3.3242°W	Somerset	Maritime	The museum is housed in an old Victorian goods shed, built in 1862, next to Watchet railway station on the heritage West Somerset Railway. The exhibits include several types of boats found locally and associated artefacts, photographs and charts, plus nets and other items associated with their use. There is also an example of a mudhorse, a wooden sledge that is propelled across the mudflats to collect fish from nets. The museum specialises in the shallow draft Flatner, a small double-ended boats with no keel, once prevalent in the Bridgwater Bay and adjacent coastal areas.
Wellington Museum	–	Wellington; 50.9755°N 3.2243°W	Somerset	Local	This free museum focuses on firms and individuals that are or were based in Wellington, particularly those linked with the woollen industry. There are also displays on Arthur Wellesley, 1st Duke of Wellington, and his association with the town.
Wells and Mendip Museum		Wells; 51.2109°N 2.6445°W	Somerset	Local	The museum is housed in the former Chancellors' House, which has 15th-century origins, although most of the current fabric of the building is from the 17th and 18th centuries. It has been designated as a Grade II listed building. The Balch Room houses exhibits of geology and fossils collected from the Mendip Hills, many of which date from the Stone Age and Iron Ages. Other exhibits include lead ingots from Roman Britain, statuary from Wells Cathedral, and a collection of 18th-century samplers.
West Somerset Rural Life Museum and Victorian School		Allerford; 51.2116°N 3.5695°W	Somerset	Rural	The building was constructed in 1821 as the village school and was closed in 1981. It is now rented from the National Trust. In 1983 it was opened as a museum, by a charitable trust, with displays of artefacts from West Somerset including cookery, laundry, tradesmen's tools, and agricultural equipment. One room in the thatched part of the building has been retained as a Victorian classroom, where children can dress in original clothing, sit at original desks and write on slates.
West Somerset Railway		Bishops Lydeard; 51.0541°N 3.1934°W	Somerset	Railway	A heritage railway with exhibits at the Bishops Lydeard railway station. On the original platform the old goods shed has been restored and is used as a visitor centre and museum; its artefacts includes a Great Western Railway sleeping car, and the Taunton Model Railway Club's model railway layout is on display.
Weston Museum		Weston-super-Mare; 51.3485°N 2.97°W	North Somerset	Local	The collection includes archaeological exhibits, including those from Worlebury Iron Age hill fort. Social history is also covered, with a particular focus on local industries such as Royal Potteries, seaside holidays, costume and domestic life. There is also a replica of a 19th-century chemist shop, along with exhibits that explore life on the Home Front for the people of North Somerset during the Second World War, from air-raids to vegetable plots, as well as secret weapons developed on Birnbeck Island.
Westonzoyland Pumping Station Museum		Westonzoyland; 51.0910°N 2.9443°W	Somerset	Technology	The museum is housed in the first of several similar pumping stations to be built on the Somerset Levels. The main attraction is the 1861 steam engine and pump, the only one still in its original location and in working order. The museum also displays a number of other steam engines and pumps, along with a short length of narrow gauge railway. The pump house has been Grade II* listed and is on the English Heritage Heritage at Risk Register.
Willows and Wetlands Visitor Centre		Stoke St Gregory; 51.0431°N 2.9356°W	Somerset	Industry	The centre offers tours of over 80 acres (32 ha) of withies, willow yards and basket workshops and explains the place of willow in the history of the Levels. It features exhibits relating to willow growing and processing and basket-making and includes a video room describing willow growing and basket making; a basket museum with displays of traditional and unusual willow artefacts; the Levels and Moors Exhibition describing the history of the local countryside and its links with this traditional industry; and an environmental interpretation display highlighting the importance of water in shaping the Somerset Levels.
Wincanton Museum		Wincanton; 51.0568°N 2.4077°W	Somerset	Local	Housed in a late 18th- or early 19th-century cottage, which is a Grade II listed building owned by the Quakers, the museum has a collection of artefacts, documents, posters and photographs related to the social history of Wincanton and the surrounding district. There is also a replica of a Victorian kitchen and a collection of 19th- and 20th-century farm implements. A separate room is devoted to World War I and World War II, when American soldiers were stationed in the town prior to the D Day landings.
Woodspring Priory		Weston-super-Mare; 51.3908°N 2.945°W	North Somerset	Religious	This is a former Augustinian priory, which was founded in the early 13th-century, and dedicated to Thomas Becket. It has been designated as a Grade I listed building. It is now owned by the Landmark Trust and rented out as holiday accommodation. There is also a small museum on the site with photographs and information about the history of the priory and its renovation by the Landmark Trust. The 15th-century barn, east cloister wall, farmhouse range, gatehouse, gates and mounting block, infirmary and west wall are also listed buildings.
Yeovil Railway Centre		Yeovil; 50.9242°N 2.6128°W	Somerset	Railway	Created in 1993 in response to British Rail's decision to remove the turntable from Yeovil Junction. Approximately a 1/4 mile of track along the Clifton Maybank spur is used for demonstration trains. The site contains a Great Western Railway transfer shed built in the 1860s, which was erected to facilitate the transfer of goods from 7 ft (2,134 mm) broad gauge to 4 ft 8 1/2 in (1,435 mm) standard gauge freight wagons. This is the last remaining shed of its type and has been converted to a visitor centre. The site also has an S.R. turntable and a 15,000-imperial-gallon (68,000 L; 18,000 US gal) water tower.

== Defunct museums ==
- Exmoor Classic Car Museum, Porlock, collection sold in 2012
- Museum of South Somerset, Yeovil, closed in 2011
- Peat Moors Centre, Westhay - was dedicated to the archaeology, history and geology of the Somerset Levels. It also included reconstructions of some of the archaeological discoveries, including a number of Iron Age round houses from Glastonbury Lake Village, and the world's oldest engineered highway, the Sweet Track. The museum closed in 2009 and its status remains uncertain. Reborn as The Avalon Marshes Centre.
- Wincanton Museum, closed in 2011

== See also ==
- Tourist attractions in Somerset
