= Royal Navy Museum, Naval Aviation =

Museum for British naval aviation history

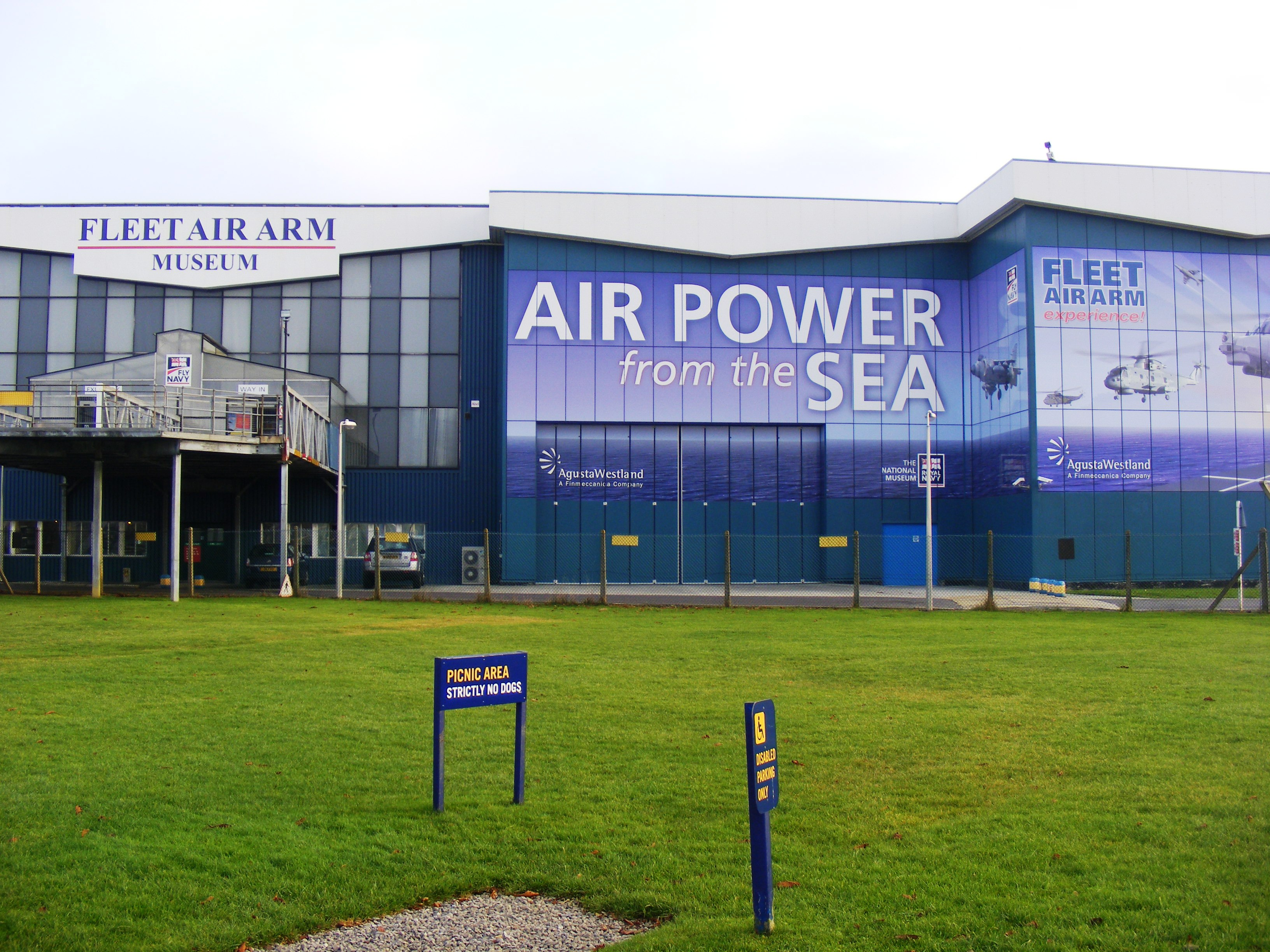

- Location within Somerset
- Established: May 1964
- Location: RNAS Yeovilton, Somerset, England
- Coordinates: 51.0150°N 2.6368°W
- Type: Aviation museum
- Visitors: 80,338 (2025)
- Website: www.royalnavymuseums.org.uk/visit-us/fleet-air-arm-museum

The Royal Navy Museum, Naval Aviation, formerly known as the Fleet Air Arm Museum of the NMRN, is devoted to the history of British naval aviation. It has an extensive collection of military and civilian aircraft, aero engines, models of aircraft and Royal Navy ships (especially aircraft carriers), and paintings and drawings related to naval aviation. It is located on RNAS Yeovilton airfield, and the museum has viewing areas where visitors can watch military aircraft (especially helicopters) take off and land. At the entrance to the museum are anchors from HMS Ark Royal and HMS Eagle, fleet carriers which served the Royal Navy until the 1970s. It is located 7 miles (11 km) north of Yeovil, and 40 miles (64 km) south of Bristol.

== Exhibits ==
As of summer 2023 the museum has two temporary exhibitions: Flight of the Red Dragon, about King Charles's time within the Fleet Air Arm and a Falklands Exhibition which brings together five aircraft which served during the 1982 Falklands War, these are:

| Type | Identity | Markings | Notes |
|---|---|---|---|
| Westland Wessex HAS.3 | XP142 | HMS Antrim Crest | Hall 1: Falklands Exhibition - Humphrey. Shrapnel damage to aircraft |
| Westland Wessex HU.5 | XT765 | J | Hall 1: Falklands Exhibition |
| Westland Sea King HAS.6 | XV663 | 771 SAR 18 Rescue / RAF Rescue | Hall 1: Falklands Exhibition - previously used by 825 NAS. Banana Split paint scheme. |
| BAE Sea Harrier FRS.1 | XZ493 | 001/N | Hall 4: Falklands Exhibition |
| Westland Lynx HAS.3 (GMS) | XZ720 | HMS Gloucester 410 | Hall 4: Falklands Exhibition - Paint scheme from the 1991 Gulf War |

The museum's main display is divided into four areas:

=== Hall 1 ===
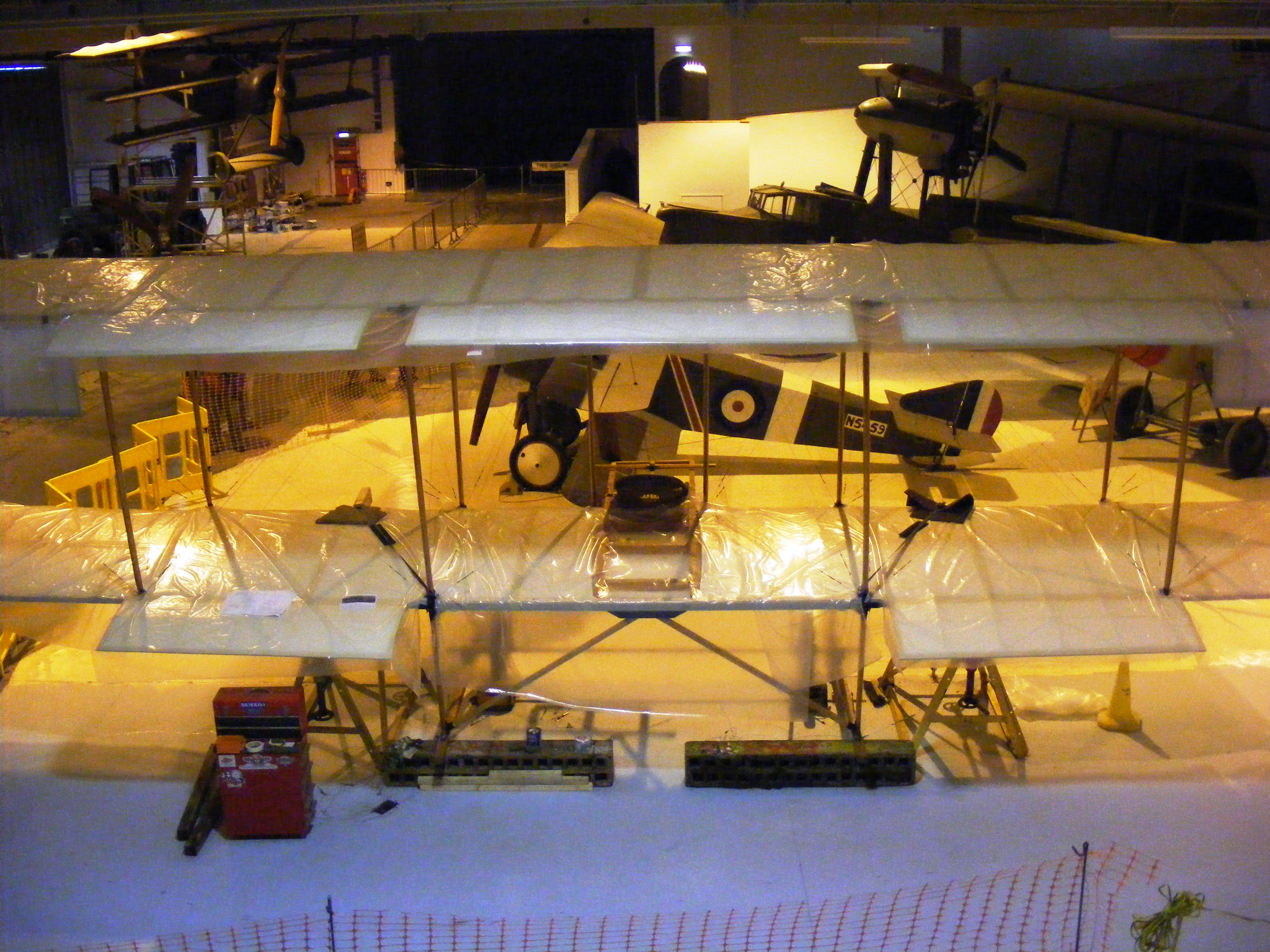
Hall 1 undergoing refurbishment during 2008

This hall contains a display about the development of naval aviation from the early days of airships and fabric-covered wooden biplanes to modern jet aircraft and helicopters, including the front section of the fuselage of Short 184 8359, built locally by Westland Aircraft in Yeovil and flown at the Battle of Jutland in 1916 before being put on display at the Imperial War Museum, where it was damaged during the Second World War when the museum was hit by a bomb. It is displayed in an unrestored condition.

Currently 2023 contains the following aircraft:

| Type | Identity | Markings | Notes |
|---|---|---|---|
| Short S.27 | | Nil | Replica An aircraft similar to this was used to make the first takeoff from a moving ship in 1912. |
| Short 184 | 8359 | Nil | Fuselage only. Museum piece bombed during WW2 |
| Sopwith Baby | N2078 | The Jabberwock | As flown by Sub Lt Hyams. Composite of 8214 & 8215 |
| Supermarine Walrus | L2301 | Nil | one of the aircraft flown by the Irish Air Corps before being bought back by the Fleet Air Arm after the war for use as a training aircraft |
| Westland Dragonfly HR.5 | VX595 | Nil | |
| Westland Wessex HAS.3 | XP142 | HMS Antrim Crest | Falklands Exhibition - Humphrey. Shrapnel damage to aircraft |
| Westland Wessex HU.5 | XT765 | J | Falklands Exhibition |
| Westland Sea King HAS.6 | XV663 | 771 SAR 18 Rescue / RAF Rescue | Falklands Exhibition - previously used by 825 NAS. Left side in Royal Navy markings and the right side in yellow Royal Air Force Rescue scheme. |

=== Hall 2 ===
Mainly devoted to the Second World War, with a side room containing a Kamikaze exhibit, which contains a Yokosuka MXY-7 Ohka II (BAPC 58), models of Japanese aircraft and final letters from Kamikaze pilots. Two aircraft from the Korean War are also displayed. By the entrance to Hall 3 there is a collection of models of British aircraft carriers, illustrating the history of aircraft carrier design.

The aircraft on display include:

| Type | Identity | Markings | Notes |
|---|---|---|---|
| de Havilland Sea Vampire I | LZ551/G | (P) | Prototype No. 3 |
| de Havilland Sea Vampire T.22 | XA127 | Nil | Pod only |
| Fairey Fulmar | N1854 | Nil | Two-seat fighter. This is the Fulmar prototype, the only surviving example out of the 800 built. |
| Fairey Swordfish II | HS618 wears P4139 | Nil | Previously used by 834 NAS. Now represents P4139, a Swordfish Mk.1 of 813 NAS |
| Focke-Achgelis Fa 330 | | Nil | |
| North American Harvard III | EX976 | Nil | American trainer |
| Grumman Hellcat | KE209 | | American single-seat fighter |
| Hawker Sea Fury FB.11 | WJ231 | 115/O | Used by 802 & 810 NAS. Painted as flown by Lt D T McKeown of 802 NAS/HMS Ocean |
| Grumman Avenger ECM.6B | XB446 | D-Day markings | American torpedo bomber/reconnaissance |
| Grumman Martlet I | AL246 | Nil | |
| Vought Corsair | KD431 | 431 S | This has had subsequent repaints removed to expose the original 1944 finish. |
| Yokosuka MXY-7 Ohka II | BAPC 58 | Nil | Japanese Kamikaze aircraft designed to be carried to its target by a converted medium bomber |
| Mikoyan-Gurevich MiG-15 | | Nil | Soviet jet fighter |
| Westland Dragonfly HR.5 | WN493 | Nil | |

=== Hall 3 ===
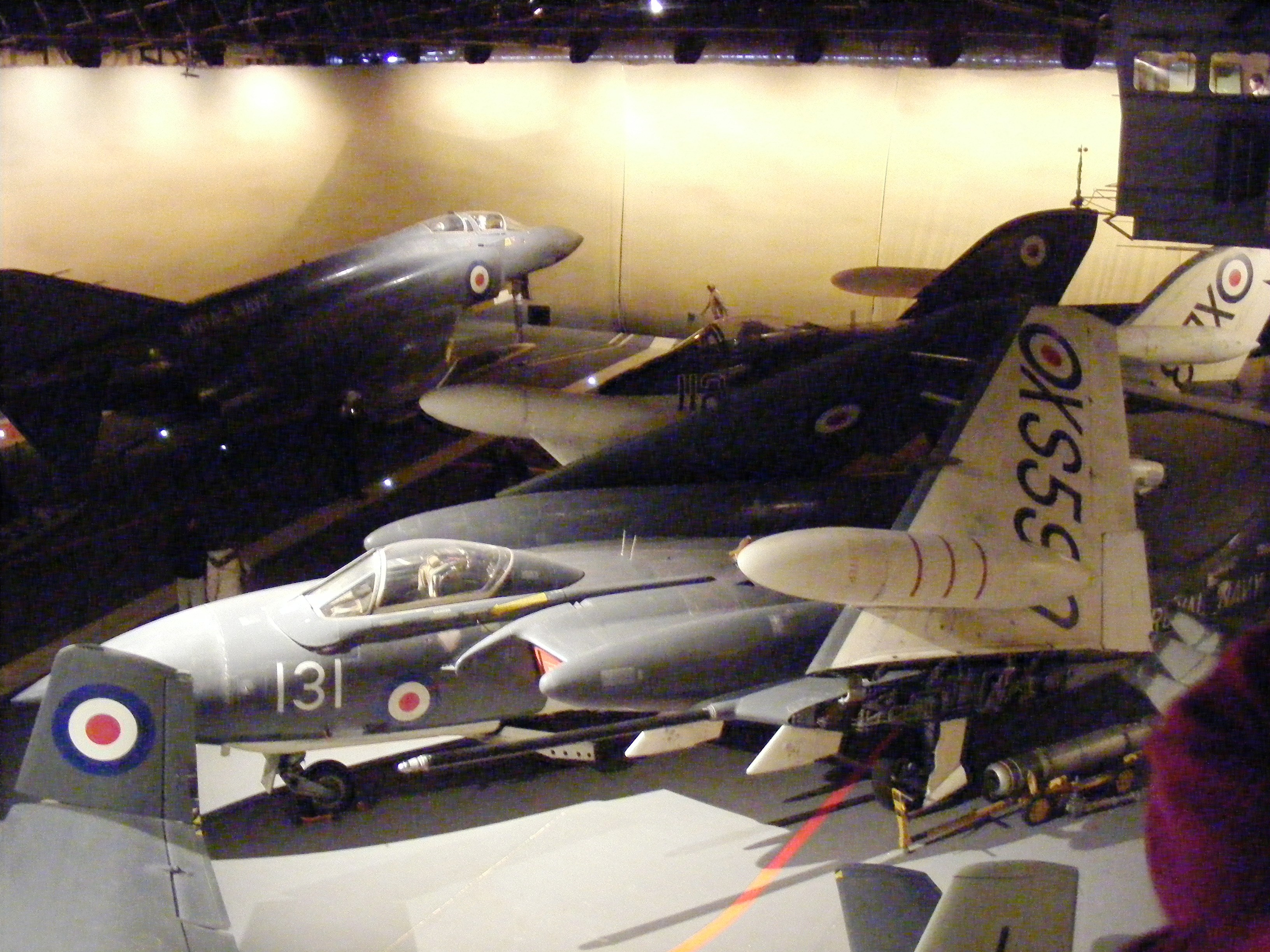
Simulation of the flight deck of HMS Ark Royal

Improved for 2023: Instead of a traditional museum hall, the whole hall has been converted into a mock-up of the fleet carrier HMS Ark Royal as it would have appeared in the 1970s with the inclusion of historical aircraft such as the Supermarine Seafire. The entrance to this hall is through a converted vibrating Wessex helicopter from Hall 2. A large screen shows historical carrier based information. There is also a series of rooms simulating the carrier's island with projections and a simulated lift ride to the top of the mock carrier.

The aircraft include:

| Type | Identity | Markings | Notes |
|---|---|---|---|
| British Aerospace Sea Harrier FA.2 | XZ499 | 003 | |
| Blackburn Buccaneer S.1 | XN957 | 630/LM | |
| de Havilland Sea Vixen FAW.2 | XS590 | 131/E | |
| McDonnell Douglas Phantom FG.1 | XT596 | Nil | |
| Sopwith Pup | N6452 | Nil | Replica |
| Supermarine Attacker F.1 | WA473 | 102/J | |
| Supermarine Seafire F.17 | SX137 | Nil | Naval version of the Supermarine Spitfire |
| Westland Wessex HU.5 | XT482 | Z-M 19 | Gilbert |
| Westland Wessex HU.5 | XT769 | Nil | Entrance to Hall 3 |
| Westland Wyvern TF.1 | VR137 | Nil | Bare Metal |

=== Hall 4 ===
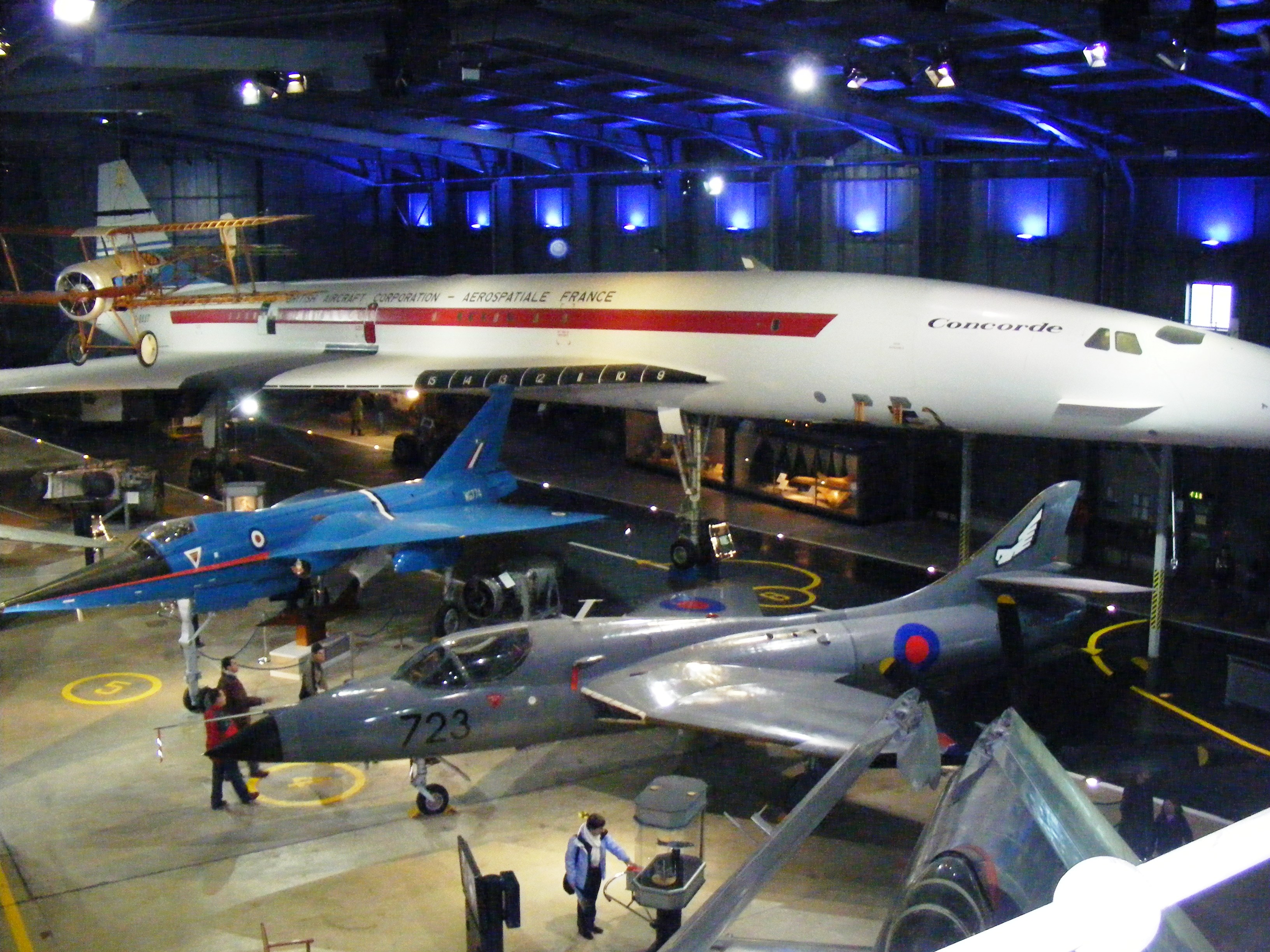
Hall 4 showing Concorde 002, Bristol Scout, BAC 221 and Hawker Hunter T8M

The aircraft on display:

| Type | Identity | Markings | Notes |
|---|---|---|---|
| BAC 221 | WG774 | Nil | Also built as part of the Concorde programme, to explore the high-speed characteristics of the ogival delta wing. |
| BAC Concorde | G-BSST | British Aircraft Corporation - Aerospatiale France | The second Concorde to fly and the first British-built example. It was flown to Yeovilton in March 1976 and opened to the public in July of that year. It has been on display ever since. |
| BAE Harrier GR.9A | ZD433 | 45A | Naval Strike Wing - Afghanistan war markings |
| BAE Sea Harrier FRS.1 | XZ493 | 001/N | Falklands Exhibition |
| Bristol Scout D | N5419 | Nil | Reproduction. Displayed without any of the fabric covering, originally powered with a vintage Le Rhone 9C rotary when flown in the USA |
| Hawker Siddeley P.1127 | XP980 | Nil | Built as part of the development process that led to the Kestrel, Hawker Siddeley Harrier and Sea Harrier. |
| Westland Sea King HC.4 | ZA298 | Y | |
| Westland Lynx HAS.3 (GMS) | XZ720 | HMS Gloucester 410 | Falklands Exhibition - Paint scheme from the 1991 Gulf War |

=== Other displays ===
In addition to the four main exhibition halls, there are a number of smaller displays. These include:

- "Barracuda Live - The Big Rebuild", showing the active restoration of Fairey Barracuda DP872
- Battle of Taranto, the Fleet Air Arm's most celebrated exploit in World War II. The display includes a Fairey Swordfish, which can also be seen from the link between halls 1 and 2.
- "Merlin Experience", which explains modern anti-submarine techniques.
- "Operation Skua", a reconstruction of the recovery of Blackburn Skua L2940
- "Pioneers to Professionals: Women of the Royal Navy"
- "Saved! 100 years of Search and Rescue" featuring three helicopters and a new soft play area
- "Welcome Gallery"

=== Reserve Collection ===
The museum's collection includes a number of aircraft which are currently being restored and are not on display, although public access is allowed at least once a year. These are housed in Cobham Hall, a climate controlled building across the road from the museum.

Aircraft include:

- Beech T-34C-1 Turbo-Mentor 0729
- Bell UH-1H Iroquois AE-422
- Bell Sioux AH.1 XT176
- Bensen B.8M G-AZAZ
- Blackburn NA.39 XK488
- de Havilland Sea Venom FAW.21 WW138
- de Havilland Sea Vixen FAW.1 XJ481
- de Havilland Tiger Moth T.2 XL717
- de Havilland Sea Vampire T.22 XA129
- Douglas Skyraider AEW.1 WV106
- Douglas Skyraider AEW.1 WT121
- Fairey Albacore N4389
- Fairey Barracuda II DP872
- Fairey Barracuda II LS931
- Fairey Firefly TT.4 VH127
- Fairey Firefly TT.1 Z2033
- Fairey Flycatcher (replica) S1287
- Fairey Gannet AEW.3 XL503
- Fairey Gannet COD.4 XA466
- Gloster Meteor T.7 WS103
- Gloster Meteor TT.20 WM292
- Handley Page HP.115 XP980: built to explore the performance of low a delta wings at low speeds.
- Hawker P.1052 VX272
- Hawker Hunter T.8M XL580
- Hawker Sea Hawk FGA.6 XE340
- Hawker Sea Hawk FGA.6 WV856
- Hawker Siddeley Buccaneer S.2B XV333
- Hawker Siddeley Harrier T.8N ZB604
- Hiller HTE1 XB480
- Hunting Jet Provost T.3A XN462
- Northrop Chukar XW994
- Northrop Shelduck XS574
- Percival Sea Prince T1 WP313
- Saro P.531 XN332
- Saro P.531 XN334
- Sopwith Camel (replica) B6401
- Sopwith Triplane (replica) N5459
- Super Eagle Hang Glider G-BGWZ
- Supermarine 510 VV106
- Supermarine Scimitar F.1 XD317/112/R
- Westland Gazelle HT.2 XW864
- Westland Lynx HAS.3 XZ699
- Westland Sea King HAS.5 XZ574
- Westland Wasp HAS.1 XS527
- Westland Wasp HAS.1 XT427
- Westland Wasp HAS.1 XT778
- Westland Wessex HU.5 XS508
- Westland Whirlwind HAR.1 XA864
- Westland Whirlwind HAR.3 XG574
- Westland Whirlwind HAS.7 XG594
- Westland Whirlwind HAS.7 XL853

=== Engines on display ===
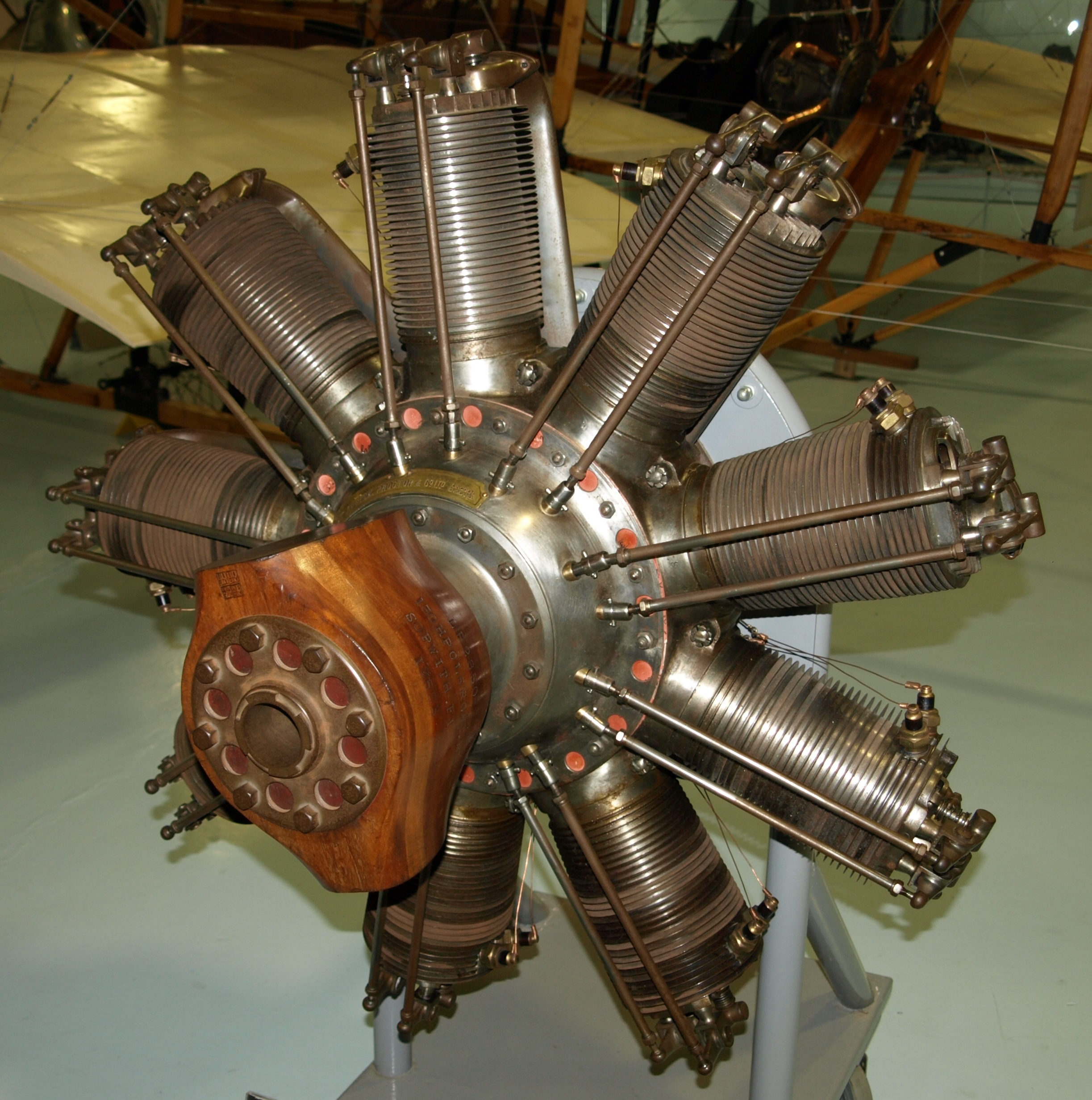
Clerget 9B rotary engine on display

The museum possesses a number of aero engines located throughout the halls.

- Alvis Leonides
- Armstrong Siddeley Cheetah
- Bristol Centaurus
- Bristol Mercury
- Bristol Siddeley BS.100
- Clerget 9B
- Bristol Siddeley Pegasus
- de Havilland Gipsy Major
- de Havilland Gipsy Queen
- Rolls-Royce Avon
- Rolls-Royce Nene
- Rolls-Royce Merlin
- Rolls-Royce/Snecma Olympus 593
- Sunbeam Gurkha
- Wright R-1820 Cyclone

== Other activities ==
=== Restoration ===
The museum also carries out various restoration projects. the last project was a Corsair KD 431 which in the summer of 2006 was unveiled as it would have appeared in 1944. In 2023 the projects underway are for a Fairey Barracuda and a Gloster Sea Gladiator. Visitors can see into (but not enter) the restoration workshop between Hall 3 and Hall 4.

=== Archives ===
The Fleet Air Arm Museum is the home to an archive of material related to naval aviation.

=== Visitor facilities ===
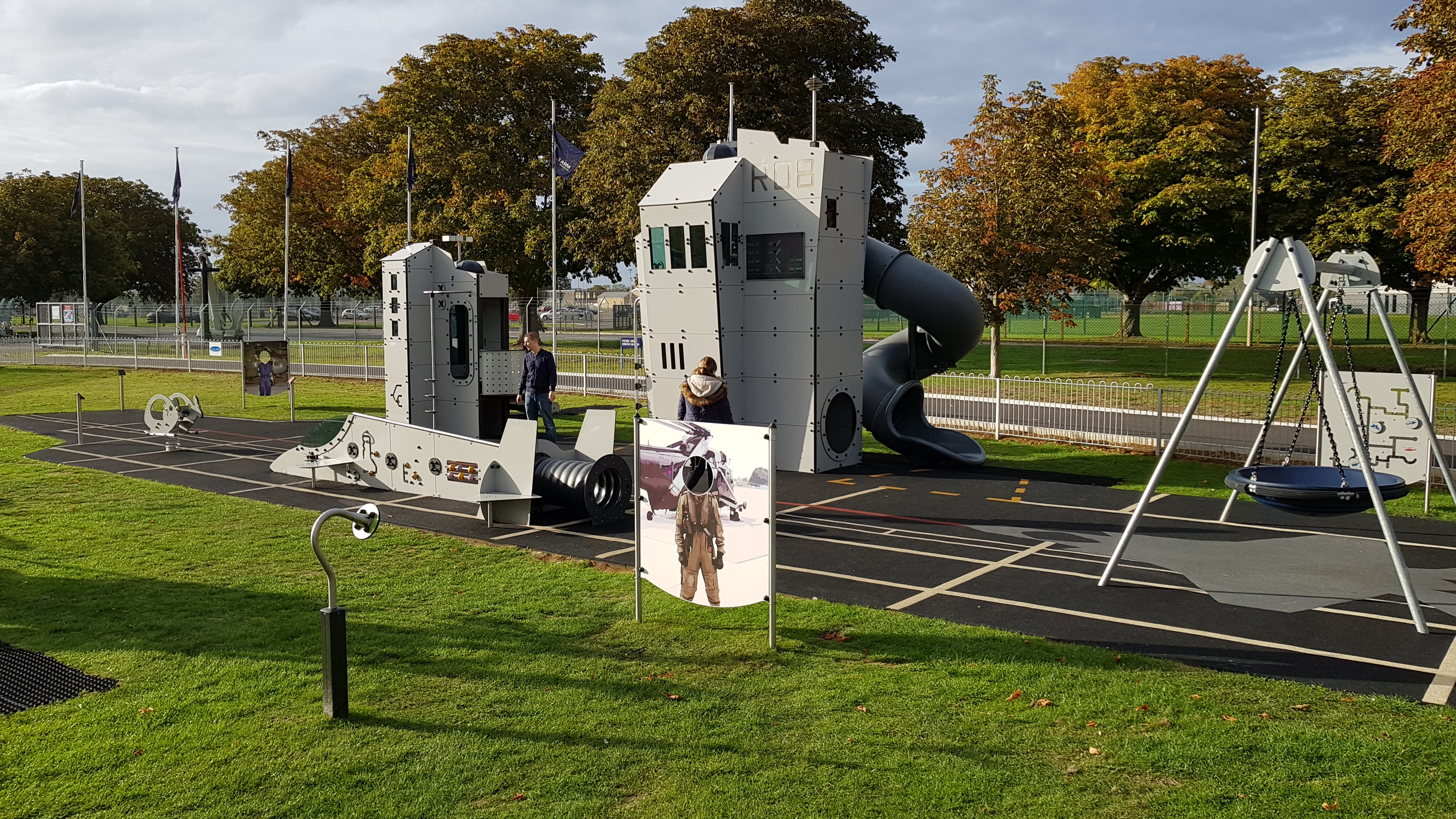
Children's playground at the Fleet Air Arm Museum

The museum's shop has the most extensive selection of naval merchandise in the area, including various themed books and documentaries such as Sailor.

There is an outside adventure playground for children in the museum's grounds and two cafés.

== See also ==
Naval aviation museums

- Australia - Fleet Air Arm Museum (Australia), Australian museum of naval aviation, Nowra, New South Wales
- Canada - Shearwater Aviation Museum, Canadian naval aviation museum, Sheerwater, Nova Scotia.
- Germany - Aeronauticum, German naval aviation museum, Nordholz
- India - Naval Aviation Museum (India), Indian naval aviation museum, Goa, India
- USA - National Naval Aviation Museum, United States museum of naval aviation, Naval Air Station Pensacola, Florida
- USA - Patuxent River Naval Air Museum, United States museum of naval aviation RDT&E, Naval Air Station Patuxent River, Lexington Park, Maryland

British military aviation museums

- Army Flying Museum
- Imperial War Museum:
  - Imperial War Museum Duxford and Imperial War Museum North
- REME Museum
- Royal Air Force Museum Cosford and Royal Air Force Museum London

Other

- List of aviation museums
- List of museums in Somerset
