= Chapel Allerton, Somerset =

Village in Somerset, England

Coordinates: 51.251°N 2.854°W

Chapel Allerton
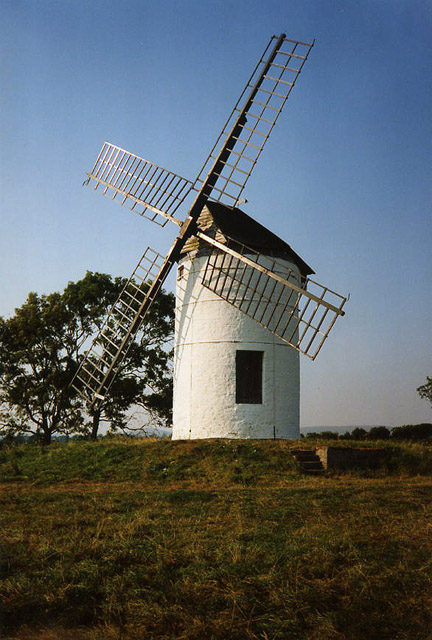
- Ashton Windmill

- Location within Somerset
- Population: 401 (2011)
- OS grid reference: ST405505
- Unitary authority: Somerset Council
- Ceremonial county: Somerset
- Region: South West
- Country: England
- Sovereign state: United Kingdom
- Post town: AXBRIDGE
- Postcode district: BS26
- Dialling code: 01934
- Police: Avon and Somerset
- Fire: Devon and Somerset
- Ambulance: South Western
- UK Parliament: Wells and Mendip Hills

Chapel Allerton is a village and civil parish, south of Cheddar in the English county of Somerset. The parish includes the hamlets of Ashton and Stone Allerton.

== History ==
The name comes from "Aelfweard's settlement", with the chapel prefix being added in 1708 to distinguish it from the adjoining Stone Allerton. The manor was brought in 1492 by John Gunthorpe and passed to the Bishop of Wells.

Chapel Allerton was part of the hundred of Bempstone.

Chapel Allerton forms part of Sedgemoor district and is located southwest of Cheddar. It is noted for the striking Ashton windmill nearby.

== Governance ==
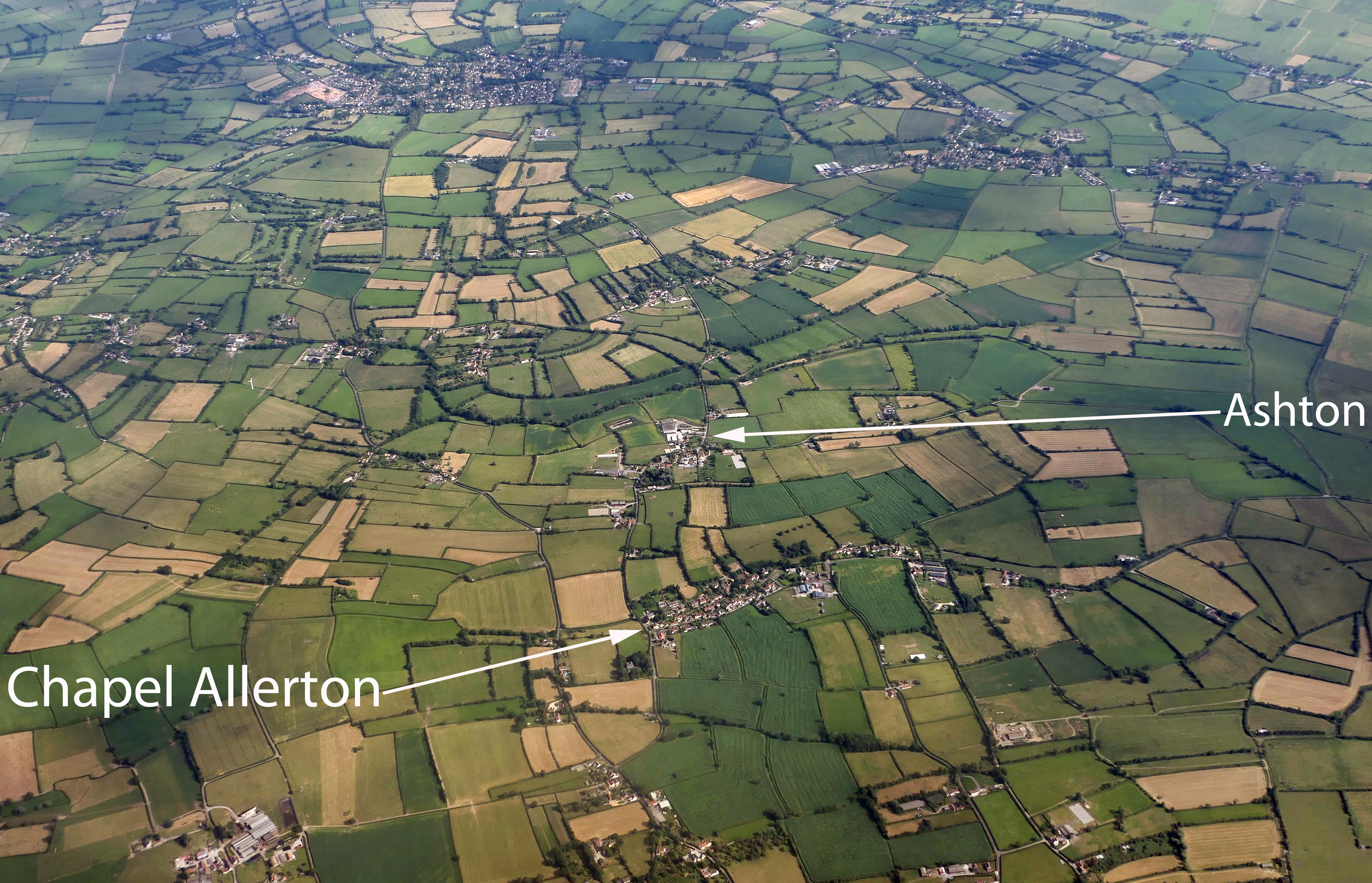
Aerial view of Chapel Allerton and Ashton.

The parish council has responsibility for local issues, including setting an annual precept (local rate) to cover the council's operating costs and producing annual accounts for public scrutiny. The parish council evaluates local planning applications and works with the local police, district council officers, and neighbourhood watch groups on matters of crime, security, and traffic. The parish council's role also includes initiating projects for the maintenance and repair of parish facilities, as well as consulting with the district council on the maintenance, repair, and improvement of highways, drainage, footpaths, public transport, and street cleaning. Conservation matters (including trees and listed buildings) and environmental issues are also the responsibility of the council.

For local government purposes, since 1 April 2023, the village comes under the unitary authority of Somerset Council. Prior to this, it was part of the non-metropolitan district of Sedgemoor, which was formed on 1 April 1974 under the Local Government Act 1972, having previously been part of Axbridge Rural District.

It is also part of the Wells and Mendip Hills county constituency represented in the House of Commons of the Parliament of the United Kingdom. It elects one Member of Parliament (MP) by the first past the post system of election. It was part of the South West England constituency of the European Parliament before Britain left the European Union in January 2020, which elected seven MEPs using the d'Hondt method of party-list proportional representation.

== Listed buildings ==
The parish church dates from the 13th century and has been designated by English Heritage as a grade II listed building. A restored cross in the graveyard is also grade II listed, as is the adjacent Manor Farmhouse.
