= Wincanton Museum =

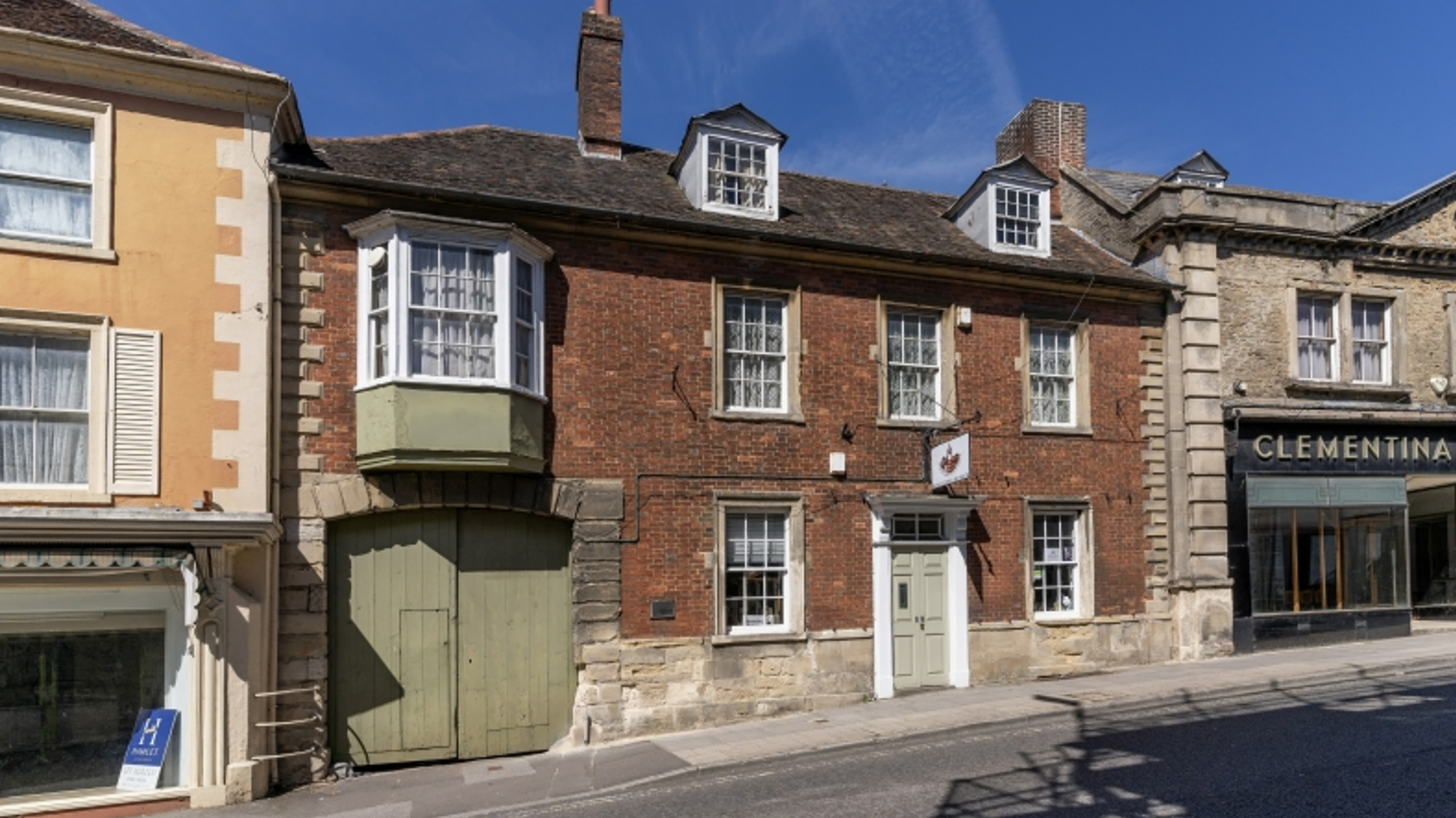

- Shown within Somerset
- Location: Wincanton, Somerset, England
- Coordinates: 51.0568°N 2.4077°W
- Type: Local museum
- President: Richard D’Arcy (2016)
- Curator: Chris Forester (2016)

Wincanton Museum is a small local museum, originally opened in the 1980s and initially located in a Grade II listed High Street cottage owned by the Quakers in Wincanton, Somerset, England.

After 10 years in a room at the Library it is back on the High Street at No 5, next to Clementina, run by the local History Society.

The Museum has a store of artefacts, documents, posters and photographs relating to the social history of Wincanton and the surrounding district. Items are gradually being introduced to the display and it is hoped to create some subject-specific displays that can be rotated every few months.

Images of some items are on the website, wincantonhistorysociety.com. Photos of local history are also on Facebook.
