= Dovery Manor Museum =

Museum in Porlock, Somerset, England

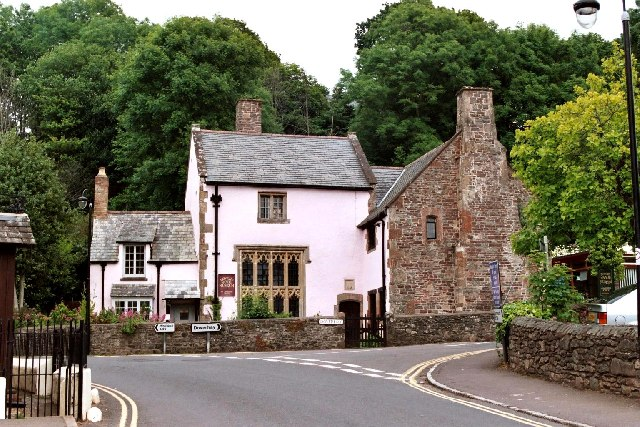

- Shown within Somerset
- Coordinates: 51°12′33″N 3°35′35″W
- Website: Dovery Manor Museum

Listed Building – Grade II*
- Official name: Doverhay Reading Room and Cottage abutting north end
- Designated: 22 May 1969
- Reference no.: 1296210

Dovery Manor Museum, also known as Porlock Museum, is a local museum in Porlock, Somerset, England.

The building was built as a Manor house in the late 15th century and extended in the 17th century. In 1895 the building was restored by Edmund Buckle for Sir Charles Chadwyck-Healey. It is a Grade II* listed building.

The museum has a collection of artefacts, photographs, press cuttings, paintings, and displays of local interest, particularly relating to Porlock Hill on the A39. In particular the events of 12 January 1899 are recorded when, during a storm, the 10-ton Lynmouth lifeboat was launched but because of the ferocity of the storm could not put out to sea, and was hauled by men and 20 horses over Countisbury and Porlock hills to Porlock Weir where the water in the bay was less rough. The endeavour enabled 13 seamen to be rescued.

At the rear of the building a herb garden is being restored with the types of plants grown for medicinal and culinary use when the manor was built.
