= Ashton Windmill =

Windmill in Somerset, England

Ashton windmill
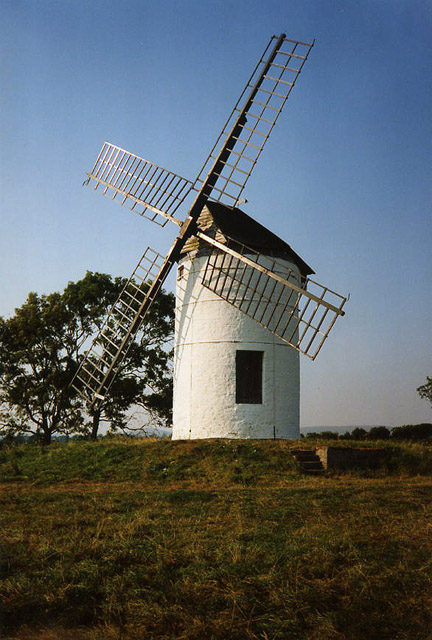

- Location within Somerset

General information
- Architectural style: Tower mill
- Location: Chapel Allerton, Somerset, England
- Coordinates: 51.248828°N 2.840119°W

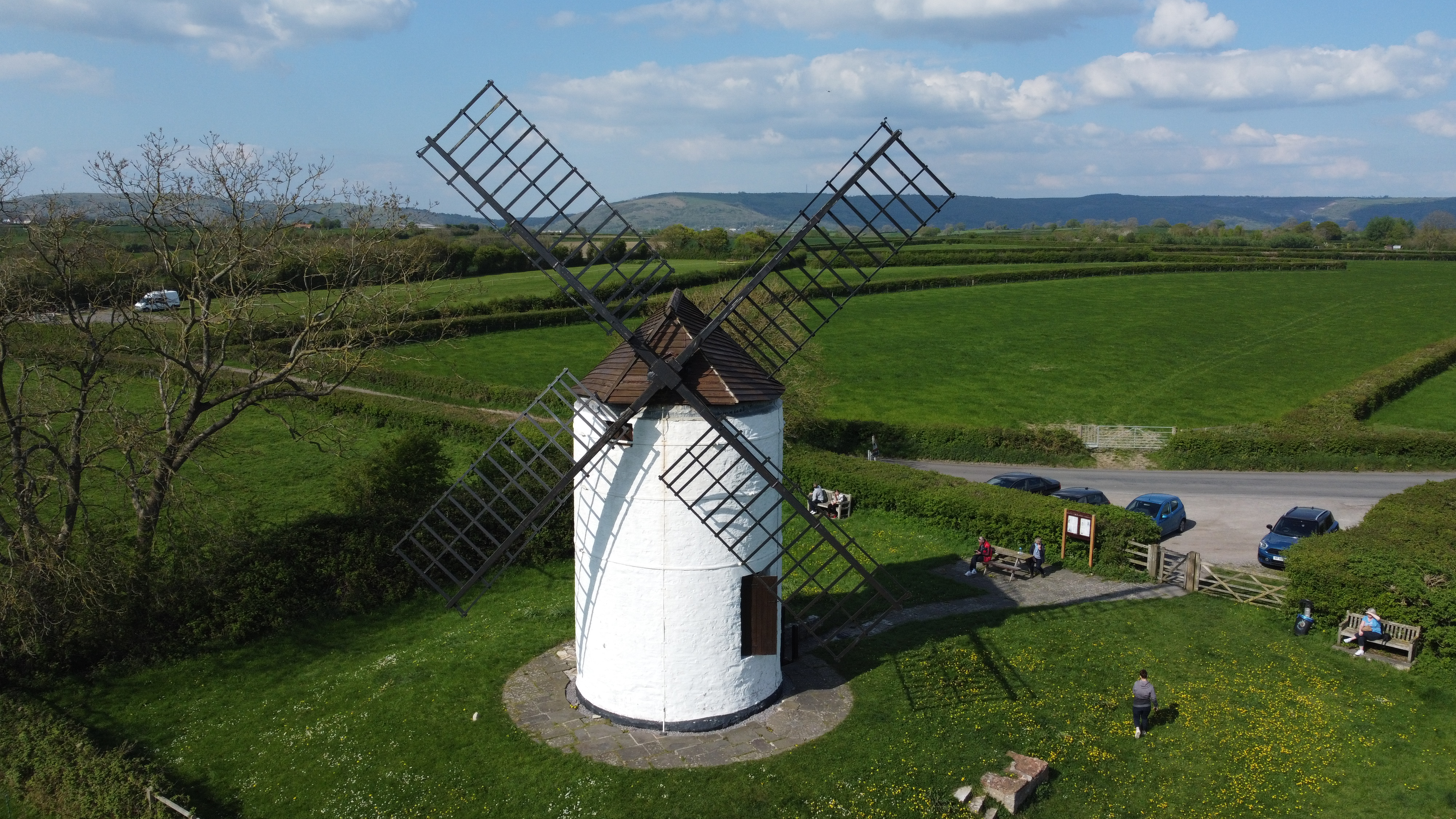

Ashton windmill is a tower mill in Chapel Allerton, Somerset, England. The mill has been designated by English Heritage as a grade II* listed building.

The mill is a typical Somerset tower mill, built of coursed colour-washed rubble, with a revolving cap, tailfan and four sails. The tower is 7.5 metres (25 ft) high, with walls 60 centimetres (24 in) thick and sails 13 metres (43 ft) across. The last millstones were 1.2 metres (3 ft 11 in) in diameter. The mill could grind 400 kilograms (880 lb) of corn in an hour and was also used for grinding beans for cattle feed.

It is the only windmill in Somerset with a complete set of working machinery. The mill is opened two afternoons a week in summer by a group of local volunteers and is free to visit, although donations are welcome.

== History ==
The history of the mill is well documented, with the earliest known record of a mill on the site in 1317. This would probably have been a postmill. The millers from 1737 to 1927 are recorded, and one of the last workers, Tom Petheram, has recorded reminiscences of life at the mill.

The present structure was built in the 1760s by the Paine family, apparently reusing timbers from the previous structure.

For a short period around the 1890s it was powered by steam. In 1900 the mill was extensively renovated by its then owner, John Stevens. The machinery was replaced with that from Moorlinch Mill, the original thatch was reframed and clad with corrugated iron, two of the broad sails were replaced with spring sails and iron hoops around the building were added.

Ashton Windmill ceased to operate in 1927 because of lower corn prices and competition from large steam-powered mills. During World War Two the mill was used as a Home Guard post. The mill was renovated in 1958, when the stonework was restored and a new boat-shaped roof, new doors and new sails were fitted. The structure and interior were extensively restored in 1979, and new steel stocks were fitted in 2009.

The mill passed to Bristol City Museum in 1966 and Sedgemoor District Council, acquired the mill in 1981; it is now owned by Somerset Council.
